= Lass =

Lass may refer to:

- A girl/young woman in Scottish/Northern English

== People ==
=== Surname ===
- August Lass (1903–1962), Estonian footballer
- Barbara Kwiatkowska-Lass (1940–1995), Polish actress
- Donna Lass (1944–c. 1970), possible victim of the Zodiac Killer
- Jakob Lass (born 1981), German film director, screenwriter, producer, and actor
- Kadri-Ann Lass (born 1996), Estonian basketball player
- Liis Lass (born 1989), Estonian actress
- Martin Lass (born 1958), American violinist
- Roger Lass (born 1937), American historical linguist
- Yoram Lass (born 1945), Israeli physician, researcher, scientist, and politician

=== Other people ===
- Lassana Diarra (also known as Lass; born 1985), French footballer
- Lass Bangoura (born 1992), Guinean footballer
- Lass Small (1923–2011), American romance novelist

== Fictional characters ==
- George Lass, television role on Dead Like Me
- Lightning Lass (original name of Ayla Ranzz), super heroine in DC Comics universe
- Shadow Lass, super heroine in DC Comics universe

== Animals ==
Horses

- Cherry Lass (1902–1914), British racehorse
- Richmond Lass (1963–1985), Australian harness racehorse
- Wayward Lass (1978–2003), American racehorse

Pigeons

- Kenley Lass (c. 1940), British war pigeon
- Scotch Lass (died 1944), British carrier pigeon

== Other ==
- The Bonnie Lass o' Fyvie, a Scottish folk song
- Solway Lass, an Australian two-master tall ship
- Tullaghmurray Lass, a prawn fishing boat lost near Northern Ireland
