= Mapuna =

White kiwi bird hatched in captivity

Mapuna is the third white kiwi to be born in captivity in November 2012, at Pūkaha National Wildlife Centre. The bird has a rare genetic condition known as leucism, causing its plumage to become all white. His name was given to him during a blessing ceremony in December 2012 by Rangitāne o Tāmaki; in Māori his name commonly means "prized" or "precious".

He is the younger brother of the late Manukura, the first white kiwi who hatched before him. He is a part of Pūkaha's captive breeding programme. Mapuna fathered several kiwi chicks with his mate Manawa.

== See also ==
- List of individual birds
