= John Silver =

John Silver may refer to:

== People ==
- John Silver (politician) (died 1724), Irish member of parliament
- John M. Silver (1846–1912), American politician from Virginia
- John Silver (musician) (born 1950), second drummer for the English rock band Genesis
- John Silver (wrestler) (born 1991), American professional wrestler

== Other ==
- John Silver (pigeon), a war pigeon active with the United States Army in World War I
- "John Silver" (song), a 1938 song by Jimmy Dorsey
- John Silver (cigarette), a Swedish brand of cigarettes
- Long John Silver, a fictional character from the novel Treasure Island
