= Canuck (disambiguation) =

Canuck is a slang term meaning Canadian.

Canuck may also refer to:

- Canuck, Saskatchewan, a ghost town in Canada
- Canuck, the name of a young orca born to Sissy; he lived in SeaWorld San Diego
- Avro Canada CF-100 Canuck, a Canadian jet interceptor/fighter that served during the Cold War
- Canuck letter, a forged letter published in 1972
- Captain Canuck, a Canadian comic book superhero
- Johnny Canuck, a Canadian cartoon hero and superhero
- Vancouver Canucks (WHL), a former minor league professional ice hockey team in the Pacific Coast Hockey League and the Western Hockey League
- Vancouver Canucks, a National Hockey League team based in Vancouver, British Columbia, Canada
- Abbotsford Canucks, an American Hockey League team based in Abbotsford, British Columbia, Canada, AHL affiliate of the NHL team Vancouver Canucks
- Canuck the Crow, a crow voted Metro Vancouver's unofficial ambassador
