= Winkie (pigeon) =

Pigeon who won the Dickin Medal

Winkie was a pigeon who won the Dickin Medal in 1943 for assisting in the rescue of an RAF aircrew forced to ditch in the North Sea during the Second World War.

== Military service ==
During World War II, Winkie was aboard a British Bristol Beaufort when it crashed in the North Sea on 23 February 1942 as a result of being badly damaged by enemy fire following a mission to Norway. Struggling in the freezing waters, the crew remembered Winkie the Pigeon, number NEHU 40 NSL. Sending her was their only chance, as the crew did not have time to radio an accurate position before ditching.

Winkie was set free and flew 120 miles home to Broughty Ferry, where her owner, George Ross discovered the exhausted pigeon. He alerted the airbase at RAF Leuchars in Fife, and a search and rescue mission was launched. Using the time difference from the plane ditching to the arrival of the pigeon in the loft, and taking into account the wind direction and the inhibition to her flight speed caused by oil spoilage to her feathers, the RAF were able to approximate where the plane ditched. Within 15 minutes, the crew's position had been located and a rescue vessel dispatched.

On 2 December 1943, Winkie was awarded the Dickin Medal. The citation read "for delivering a message under exceptional difficulties and so contributing to the rescue of an Air Crew while serving with the RAF in February 1942." Winkie received her medal from Maria Dickin in March 1943. The crew were rescued and later held a dinner for Winkie, who basked in her cage as she was toasted by the officers. When Winkie died, Ross donated her and her Dickin Medal to Dundee Art Galleries and Museums.

== In literature and music ==
"Winkie" is the subject of a poem in Douglas Dunn's 1988 collection Northlight, published by Faber & Faber (London).

The seventh track, titled "Winkie", on progressive rock band Big Big Train's 2016 album Folklore is based on the story of Winkie.

== See also ==
- List of individual birds
