= Charlie (parrot) =

Female blue-and-yellow macaw (1899–2014)

- Other name: Charlie The Curser
- Species: Blue-and-yellow macaw (Ara ararauna)
- Sex: Female
- Hatched: 1899; England
- Employer: Heathfield Nurseries
- Notable role: Captive
- Tricks: English words
- Owners: Heathfield Nurseries, Reigate

Charlie, also known as Charlie the Curser, is a female blue-and-yellow macaw who lives in a garden centre in Reigate, Surrey, England.

== Claimed association with Churchill ==
The owner claimed the parrot was that of Sir Winston Churchill while he was the United Kingdom's prime minister during World War II. He claims that his father-in-law sold the parrot to Churchill in 1937 and then reclaimed the bird shortly after Churchill's death in 1965. According to his stories, the vocal bird was taught by Churchill to shout curses at Adolf Hitler, the leader of Germany, with which Britain was at war with.

The claim is solidly rejected by the administrators of the Chartwell property, Churchill's former country home, who note only that he kept a grey parrot elsewhere. Further, Churchill's daughter, Lady Soames, has denied her father ever owned a macaw. She added he owned a grey parrot named Polly, but sold the bird before becoming prime minister.

It is reported Charlie has been living at Heathfield Nurseries, where she is most frequently cared for by the establishment's manager, Sylvia Martin. Martin says that she has become 'grumpy' in her old age, but is still a 'bright bird'.

== See also ==
- List of individual birds
