= Joe the Pigeon =

Pigeon in Australia

Joe
- Joe the Pigeon
- Species: Domestic pigeon
- Breed: Turkish tumbler
- Sex: Male
- Nationality: Australia
- Named after: Joe Biden

Joe the Pigeon is a tumbler pigeon found in Melbourne, Australia and named after Joe Biden, who at the time was President-elect of the United States. According to initial reports, the pigeon was believed to have flown 13,000 kilometres (8,100 mi; 7,000 nmi) from Oregon to Melbourne in December 2020. The pigeon was identified based on a leg ring that matched that of a racing pigeon from Oregon that had disappeared two months earlier, though the ring was later found to be counterfeit. The pigeon was scheduled to be euthanised as a biosecurity risk, but was released by the Australian government after being determined unlikely to be of foreign origin.

== Discovery and confinement ==
The pigeon was first noticed by Kevin Celli-Bird, a resident of Melbourne, Australia, when he saw the pigeon, "very weak and in an emaciated state", in his backyard on December 26, 2020. While feeding Joe in an attempt to revitalise him, Celli-Bird noticed a ring on Joe's leg. Celli-Bird traced the tag to an owner in Alabama who had last seen the bird after it flew off from a race in Oregon. The pigeon was named 'Joe' by Celli-Bird after Joe Biden, due to the bird's alleged journey beginning in the United States. It was speculated that Joe had crossed the distance on a container ship, as flying the 13,000 kilometres (8,100 mi; 7,000 nmi) from Oregon to Melbourne would have beaten the previous record for the longest bird flight at 12,000 kilometres (7,500 mi; 6,500 nmi).

Celli-Bird was contacted by the Australian Department of Agriculture, Water and the Environment after Joe the Pigeon received press coverage in Australian media. The Department stated that the pigeon would have to be captured and euthanised as a disease risk, which led to outcry against the Australian government. Deputy Prime Minister of Australia Michael McCormack called the incident "bad luck": "If Joe has come in a way that has not met our strict biosecurity measures, then bad luck Joe, either fly home or face the consequences." Politicians Andy Meddick and Martin Foley called for Joe to be quarantined instead of euthanised, with Meddick calling for the federal government to "take Joe off death row".

== Release ==
Deone Roberts of the American Racing Pigeon Union stated on January 15, 2021, that the leg ring found on Joe was "counterfeit and not traceable". It was revealed that Joe is a Turkish tumbler, a breed bred for mid-air tricks rather than long-distance flight. After an investigation, the Department stated that "Joe the Pigeon is highly likely to be Australian and does not present a biosecurity risk", granting him a pardon. Celli-Bird stated that he had bought birdseed for Joe to eat: "As long as he’s happy to stay there I’ll let him stay and if he chooses to fly off, he can do that too."

== See also ==
- List of individual birds
- List of things named after Joe Biden
