= Louis (parrot) =

- Species: Blue and yellow macaw
- Sex: Male
- Born: South America
- Hatched: Between 1860–1880
- Nationality: Canada
- Owners: Victoria Wilson, Yue Wah Wong

Louis was a well-known parrot from Victoria, British Columbia. From the time of his reclusive owner's death in 1949 until 1966, he continued to live on his owner's estate, well-provided for in her will, and preventing development of the prime real estate.

== History ==
Victoria Jane Wilson (1878–1949) was born in Victoria to wealthy European-Canadian parents. Her father Keith Wilson was manager of the Bank of BC, and dabbled in real estate. Her mother Mary Wilson was the daughter of Alexander Munro, a fur trader.

The Wilson home was a three-story mansion at 730 Burdett Street. At the age of five, Victoria received a Blue-and-yellow macaw as a pet whom she named Louis. From this point she began to obtain many other birds, and later converted the entire top floor of the mansion into an aviary. In 1911, Victoria asked her father to buy her a luxury Hupp-Yeats electric car in order to take Louis on short drives.

Wilson led a reclusive life with her birds at the mansion on Courtney Street where she had been raised until her death in 1949 at the age of seventy-two. Her will also included the electric car, and provided a large amount of funds to take care of her fifty-three birds, in which Mr. Yue Wah Wong, Wilson's trusted gardener, was to be paid $250 a month (equivalent to $2,700 today) to be the birds' caretaker.

Life magazine featured a one-page article on Louis in the August 9, 1963 issue, titled "The Old Bird Won't Sell". Magazine writer Russell Sackett had first written about Louis in 1957, and returned to Victoria in 1963 for a welfare checkup. Sackett reported that "Louis callously recovered from the pain of his mistress's passing and, to Abrams's rueful astonishment, seemed to take a new lease on life" in Mr. Wong's care. Louis was a well-known local resident at this point in his life for not only enjoying a typical diet of seeds, nuts, and fruit, but also enjoying hard-boiled eggs, walnuts, and two bottles of brandy per year, doled out daily in small dollops. For his alcohol consumption, news reports at the time liked to humorously refer to him as a lush.

In 1966, the lawyer administering the Wilson estate transferred ownership of the bird to Mr. Wong, and Louis went to live with him and his family. Wong was delighted, but he died in 1967 shortly after taking Louis in. Mr. Wong's family continued to care for Louis until his death in 1985, at over 100 years old.

Louis' relocation allowed the Wilson property be developed as the Chauteau Victoria hotel in 1975, with a restaurant called the Parrot House on the top floor (later renamed "Vista 18").

Today, Louis has been described as a folk hero to Victoria's city heritage preservationists. Victoria Daily Times columnist Arthur Mayse noted that Louis "is regarded ... as a jewel in the city's crown." The top award of Hallmark Society of the Capital Regional District is called the Louis Award, awarded for exceptional heritage building restoration.

== See also ==
- List of individual birds
