= Rufus the Hawk =

English hawk at Wimbledon

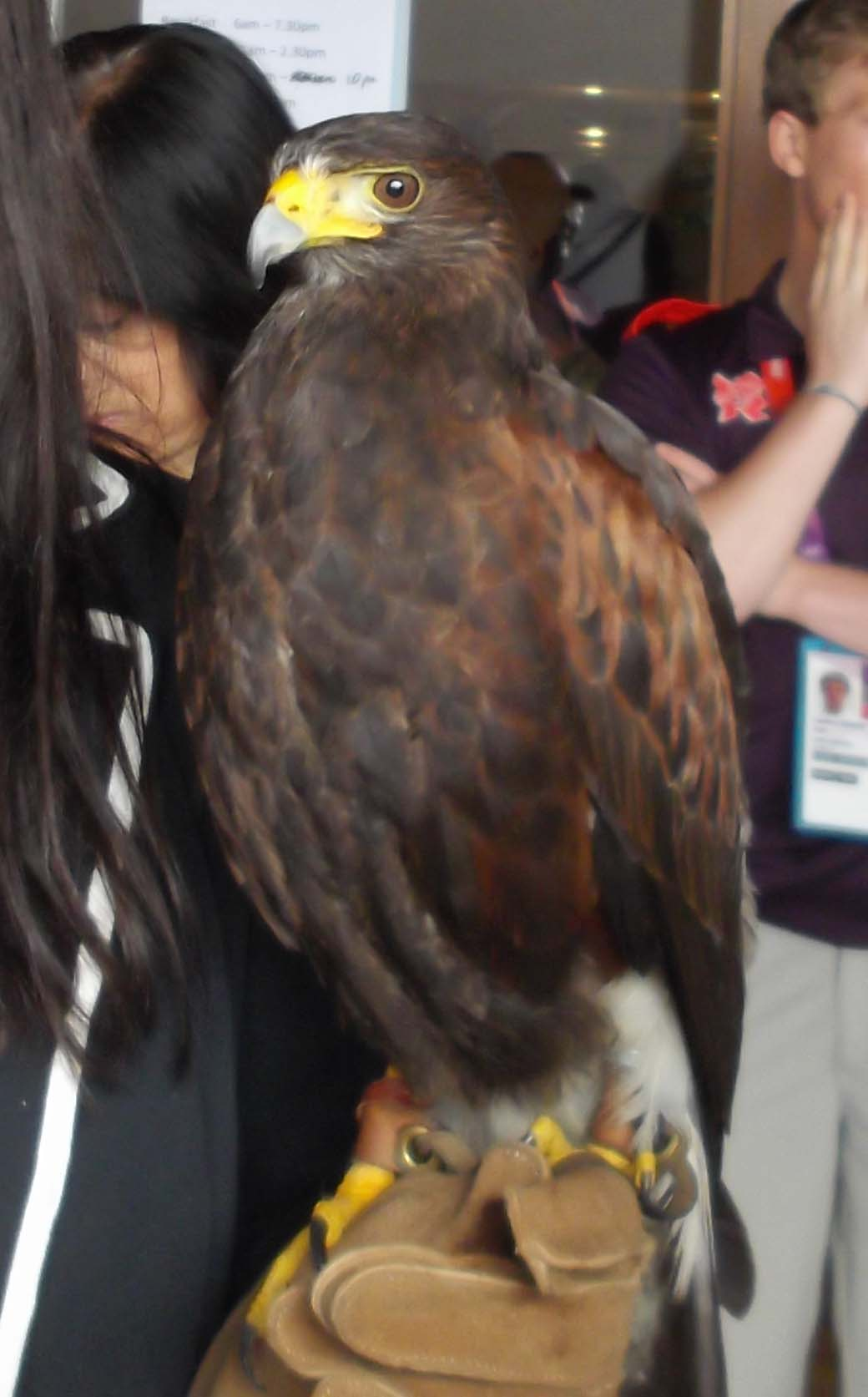
- Rufus at the 2012 Summer Olympics
- Species: Harris's hawk
- Sex: Male
- Born: 2008; Brigstock
- Occupation: Bird scarer
- Known for: Scaring birds away from the Wimbledon Championships
- Owner: Wayne Davis
- https://avianenvironmentaluk.co.uk

Rufus the Hawk (born 2008) is a Harris's hawk used by the All England Lawn Tennis and Croquet Club to keep pigeons away from their venue. Described as an "important member of the Wimbledon family", Rufus took over from the previous hawk, Hamish. Rufus has accounts on Twitter and Facebook and his own Wimbledon security photocard pass with the job title of "Bird Scarer".

Rufus was raised in Brigstock by Avian Environmental Consultants. He first appeared at the Wimbledon Championships in 2008 when he was 18 weeks old. The All England Club employ Rufus to patrol their 42-acre grounds throughout the year, with daily visits during the two weeks of Wimbledon Championships. He also worked daily during the 2012 Summer Olympics. Pigeons are particularly attracted to the roof of the centre court. He has also been employed to scare pigeons away from Westminster Abbey, various hospitals, airfields, and landfill sites.

On 28 June 2012, Rufus was stolen from the back of his owner's car while it was parked on a private drive. The theft caused a "global outcry" with significant coverage in the media leading to Rufus being named "the world's most notable bird" and "one of Britain's best-known birds". He was found three days later on Wimbledon Common and handed into the RSPCA. The bird was healthy with the only injury being a slightly sore leg. Rufus usually wears a radio transmitter by which he could have been tracked, but it is removed from him at night. In June 2013, it was reported that Rufus was scared by people in hoods and that he had been chased off by crows.

In 2025, Rufus's handler stated that she had tried to set Rufus up with a female hawk named Pamela to create chicks to succeed him, however Pamela was aggressive with Rufus and they did not mate. In 2026, she expressed concerns that Rufus's job may be taken by drones in the future, although the All England Club stated that it had no intention of replacing him.

== See also ==
- List of individual birds
