= Petra (swan) =

Black swan which loved a swan-like pedalo

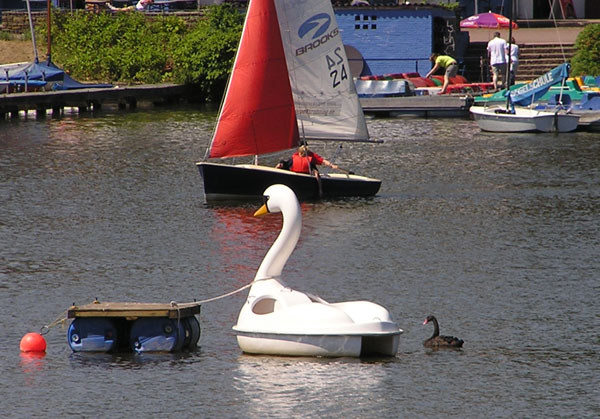
- Petra and her synthetic mate, photographed during Summer 2006 on the Aasee, a lake in Münster, Germany.

Petra is a female black swan that appeared in international news between 2006 and 2008 when she developed an attachment to a pedalo that resembled a swan on the Aasee, a lake located in Münster, in Germany.

Petra disappeared at the beginning of January 2009. Citizens and the media took action to try to find her.

Petra was seen again during Spring 2013, in Osnabrück, partnered with another swan.

== See also ==
- List of individual birds
