= Goldie (eagle) =

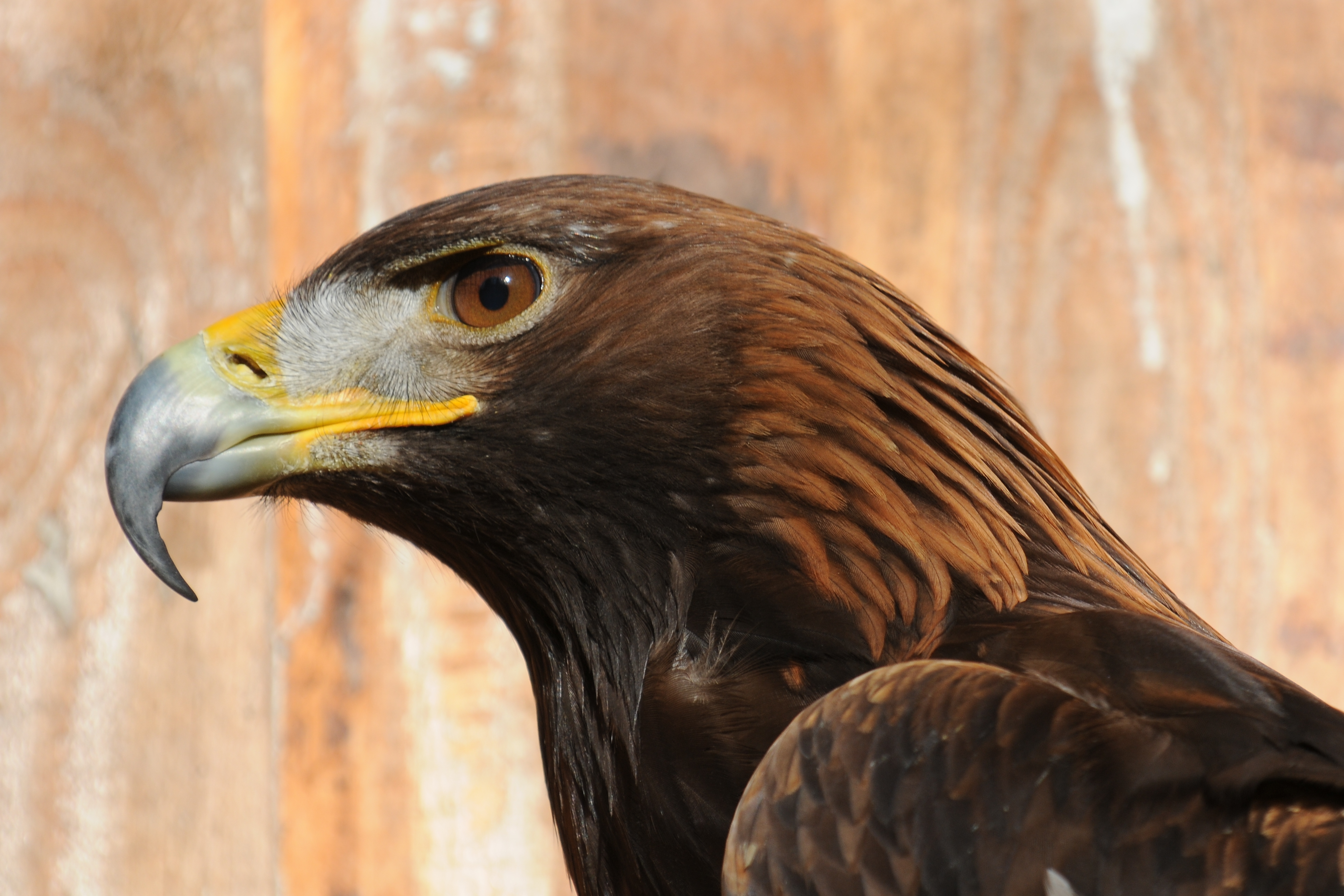
Golden eagle (Aquila chrysaetos), Goldie's species

Goldie was a male golden eagle who lived at London Zoo in England during the 1960s. He caused a nationwide sensation when he escaped for 12 days in February 1965.

Goldie flew away from his keepers on 28 February 1965 while his cage was being cleaned. He avoided being recaptured for nearly two weeks, despite a massive effort using equipment borrowed from the Royal Navy and Civil Defence Corps. Goldie spent most of the time in Regent's Park, which surrounds the zoo, but he also made excursions into the nearby neighbourhoods of Camden Town, Tottenham Court Road and Euston.

Goldie's escape enthralled the British public. The zoo received thousands of phone calls and letters, and large crowds gathered in Regent's Park to watch the bird's keepers trying to catch him. There were severe traffic jams in the area as drivers circled the park, watching Goldie in flight.

The saga was closely covered by the media. On a BBC television programme, the reporter John Timpson unsuccessfully tried to lure Goldie by playing an Ethiopian bird pipe. Goldie was also mentioned during a debate in the House of Commons, where Members of Parliament greeted his name with cheers.

While free, Goldie killed and ate a Muscovy duck in the garden of Winfield House, official residence of the United States Ambassador to the United Kingdom, within Regent's Park. Goldie also attacked two terriers in the park, but was driven off by their owner. He is reported to have attempted an attack on a snow goose, which was able to escape.

Goldie was caught on 11 March after the zoo's deputy head keeper lured him in with a dead rabbit. He was in good health after his experience and was reunited with his mate, Regina. The zoo's attendance nearly doubled in the days after his return.

Goldie escaped once again on 15 December 1965, and was recaptured on 19 December 1965.

On 8 March 1985, Goldie was sent to the Falconry Centre in Newent, and died there in 1986.

== See also ==
- List of individual birds
