= Grip (raven) =

Pet of Charles Dickens (1839–1841)

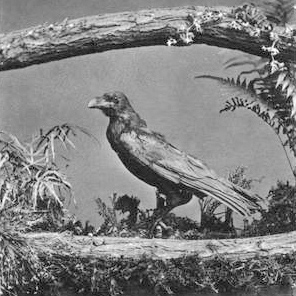
- Grip after taxidermy
- Species: Corvus corax
- Sex: Female
- Hatched: c. 1839; England
- Died: 12 March 1841; London, England
- Cause of death: Lead poisoning
- Resting place: Parkway Central Library; Philadelphia, Pennsylvania, U.S.
- Known for: Inspiring characters in Barnaby Rudge and "The Raven"
- Tricks: Talking
- Owner: Charles Dickens
- Residence: 1 Devonshire Terrace, Marylebone

Grip was a talking raven kept as a pet by Charles Dickens. She was the basis for a character of the same name in Dickens's 1841 novel Barnaby Rudge and is generally considered to have inspired the eponymous bird from Edgar Allan Poe's 1845 poem "The Raven".

Grip lived with the Dickens family in their home at 1 Devonshire Terrace, Marylebone. She could repeat several phrases, she buried coins and cheese in the garden, and she often bit people, including the coachman and the children. Following an incident where Grip bit one of the Dickens children, she was banished to the shed.

Grip died in 1841, possibly from lead poisoning after consuming a large amount of lead paint. After a necropsy, Dickens had her stuffed and mounted. She was displayed above the desk in his study and he replaced her with another raven he also named Grip. Her remains passed through the hands of several collectors after Dickens's death and are now on display in the Rare Book Department of the Parkway Central Library in Philadelphia.

== Life in London ==
Grip was a female common raven (Corvus corax), hatched in England c. 1839. Charles Dickens may have been considering including a raven as a character in his novel Barnaby Rudge as early as 1839. After he announced to his neighbours that he had a fancy for ravens, Grip was discovered in a "modest retirement" in London by Frederick Ash and given to Dickens.

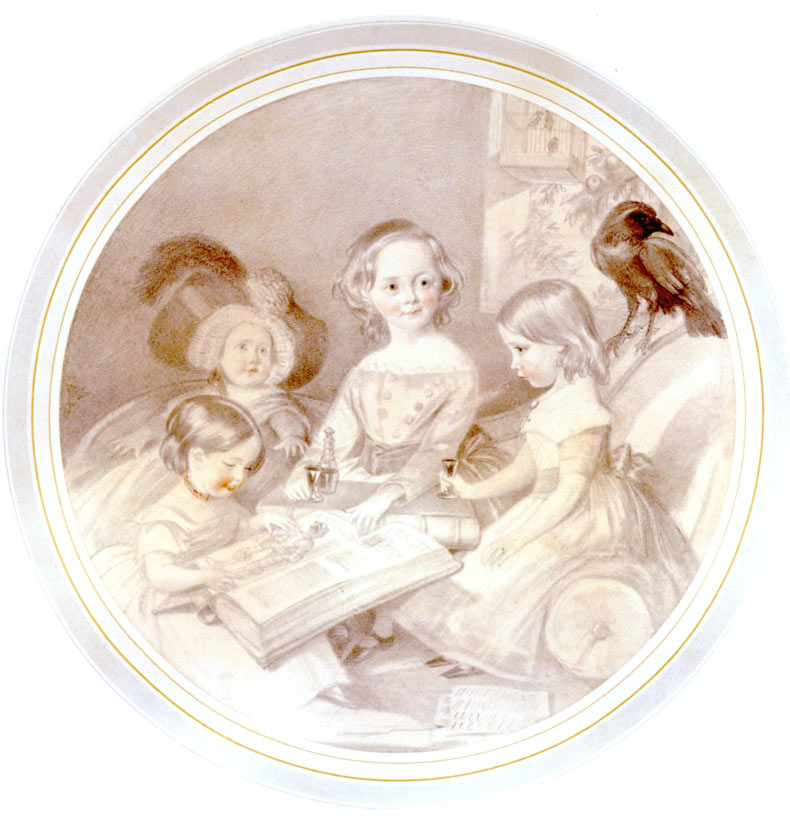
A portrait by Daniel Maclise of Dickens's children with what is probably the third raven named Grip.

Dickens named the raven Grip and she lived with the Dickens family at 1 Devonshire Terrace, in Marylebone near Regent's Park. The earliest mention of Grip was in a letter from Dickens to his friend Daniel Maclise on 13 February 1840 in which he joked, "I love nobody here but the Raven, and I only love him because he seems to have no feeling in common with anybody."

Grip was treated as a family pet in the Dickens household, allowed to roam freely like a cat or a dog. She grew to be 18 inches in length and her wingspan was at least 25 inches.

She was a talking bird and knew several phrases, her favourite being "halloa old girl". She may have also used some of the phrases that were used by the character Grip in Dickens's Barnaby Rudge, including "Polly, put the kettle on, we'll all have tea"; "keep up your spirits", and "Bow, wow, wow".

She buried halfpence and cheese in the garden outside the house. In a letter to Angela Burdett-Coutts, Dickens related how the bird had also buried several raw potatoes, a brush, and a large hammer that was thought to have been stolen from a carpenter.

Grip was known to "hector horses, pets and children in the Dickens household". She terrorized the Dickens family dog, a Newfoundland, stealing his dinner from under him, and once gave a "nasty bite" to the man who tended the horses. Grip also bit the ankles of the children. After an incident where Grip bit one of the children, Catherine Dickens insisted that the raven live in the shed. Thereafter, Grip slept in the carriage house, "generally on horseback".

Grip used her beak to rip off sections of painted surfaces - typical corvid behaviour. The family's carriage was among her targets.

== Lead poisoning and death ==
Sometime in 1840, the stable where Grip slept was freshly painted. Grip noticed the careful attention that the painters had given to their paint, and after they went to dinner, she drank the white paint they had left behind. The paint was lead-based and, according to Dickens, Grip ate "a pound or two of white lead".

Grip recovered, but became ill in March 1841. A veterinarian was summoned who gave "a powerful dose of castor oil" to the raven. Dickens initially thought the medicine had worked, as Grip bit the coachman, which indicated that she had been restored to her usual personality. While Grip was able to ingest warm gruel the next morning, her recovery did not last and she died on 12 March 1841.

Dickens recalled Grip's death in a letter to Daniel Maclise:

"On the clock striking twelve he appeared slightly agitated, but soon recovered, walking twice or thrice along the coach-house, stopped to bark, staggered, exclaimed 'Halloa old girl' (his favourite expression) and died. He behaved throughout with a decent fortitude, equanimity, and self-possession, which cannot be too much admired... The children seem rather glad of it. He bit their ankles. But that was play."

Dickens himself entertained suspicions that Grip had been a victim of intentional poisoning, singling out a "malicious butcher" and the publisher Charles Knight. He had a post-mortem examination of the raven done at the school of anatomy of one Mr Herring.

== As a literary inspiration ==
Dickens wrote about his notion to portray Grip as a character in his book Barnaby Rudge in a 28 January 1841 letter to the artist George Cattermole. Dickens relayed, "Barnaby being an idiot, my notion is to have him always in company with a pet raven, who is immeasurably more knowing than himself. To this end I have been studying my bird, and think I could make a very queer character of him."

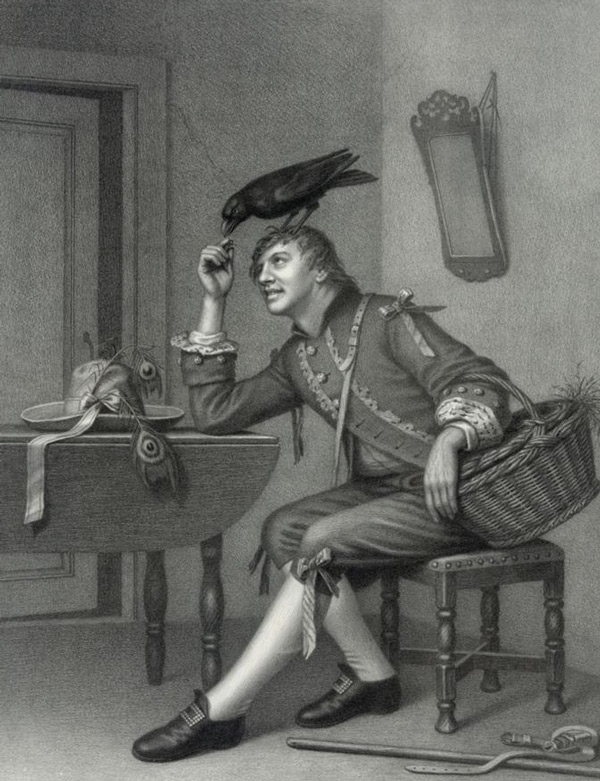
The character Barnaby Rudge with Grip perched on his head

Edgar Allan Poe wrote two reviews of the serialised novel for Graham's Magazine, first in May 1841 after three instalments had been published and then in February 1842 following the conclusion of the novel. Poe enjoyed the character of Grip, but considered Barnaby Rudge to be a failed murder mystery and characterised the denouement as "exceedingly feeble and ineffective". He wrote:

The raven, too, intensely amusing as it is, might have been made more than we see it, a portion of the conception of the fantastic Barnaby. Its croaking might have been prophetically heard in the course of the drama. Its character might have performed, in regard to that of the idiot, much the same part as does, in music, the accompaniment in respect to the air. Each might have been distinct. Each might have differed remarkably from the other. Yet between them there might have been wrought an analogical resemblance, and although each might have existed apart, they might have formed together a whole which would have been imperfect in the absence of either.

During Dickens's 1842 trip to the United States, he and Poe met twice in Philadelphia. Dickens had brought the portrait of his children and Grip. Poe was said to be "delighted" to learn that Grip was based on a real bird.

Poe wrote "The Raven" two years after Dickens visited Philadelphia and "both met and groused about copyright infringement" according to La Salle University lecturer Edward G. Pettit.

The character of Grip and the raven itself are generally considered by Poe scholars to have inspired his 1845 poem "The Raven". Poe first published "The Raven" in January 1845 in the New York Evening Mirror.

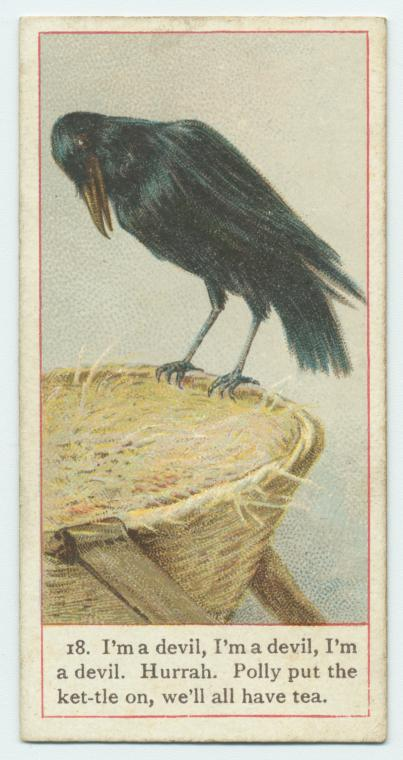
A cigarette card depicting the Grip from Barnaby Rudge, uttering some of his favorite phrases.

The similarities between Poe's raven and Dickens's character of Grip drew commentary from many reviewers and literary scholars. A couplet in James Russell Lowell's 1848 A Fable for Critics links Poe's Raven to Dickens's Grip, "There comes Poe with his raven, like Barnaby Rudge, / Three-fifths of him genius and two-fifths sheer fudge."

The utterances of "Nevermore" by Poe's raven bear a similarity to Grip's set phrases, "Never say die" and "Nobody".

At the end of the fifth chapter of Barnaby Rudge, Grip makes a noise and someone asks, "What was that — him tapping at the door?" Another character responds, "'Tis someone knocking softly at the shutter.'" This language resembles the lines from Poe's poem, "While I nodded, nearly napping, suddenly there came a tapping, As of someone gently rapping, rapping at my chamber door."

== Taxidermy ==
Following Grip's death in 1841, Dickens had a taxidermist (Note: The taxidermist who stuffed Grip is thought to have inspired the character Mr. Venus from Dickens's novel Our Mutual Friend.) stuff her, treat her with arsenic, and mount her on a branch in a glass case measuring 27" x 25". (Note: Grip was not the only pet that Dickens had stuffed. Dickens had one of the paws of his cat Bob made into a letter opener.) For the case, Dickens provided branches from his country home, Gads Hill Place.

Dickens was said to have either mounted Grip above his desk in his study or on the mantelpiece in his library. The raven remained there until Dickens's death in 1870.

== Other Grips ==
After Grip died, Dickens secured a new raven that he also named Grip, as well as an eagle. The second raven was from a pub in Yorkshire. Dickens wrote that the bird was rather dumber than the last and his daughter Mary mentioned in her memoirs that the second Grip was "mischievous and impudent".

The third Grip was described by Dickens' son, Henry Fielding Dickens, to dominate other family pets, including their dog Turk, a mastiff who allowed the raven to eat his food.

== Auction of taxidermied corpse ==
Following Dickens's death in 1870, the taxidermied remains of Grip were sold at a Christie's auction alongside his other possessions. The raven was recorded as "Mr. Dickens's Favourite Raven — in a glazed case". According to London newspapers of the time, Grip was "the subject of a hot rivalry in Christie's sale-room". One paper reported that:

"The value of this ornithological specimen at any commonplace second-hand shop might have been five shillings or so, but the particular stuffed raven sold on Saturday was only to be obtained by the purchaser for a sum of one hundred and twenty guineas."

She was purchased by George Swan Nottage for 120 guineas. As the owner of the London Stereoscopic and Photographic Company, he may have purchased the raven to create stereoscopic images of her. His wife inherited Grip upon his death in 1885, and when she died in 1916, the raven was auctioned again, this time for 78 guineas. Grip then came into the hands of second-hand bookstore owner Walter Thomas Spencer before being purchased by Ralph Tennyson Jupp, a collector of Dickensiana. Jupp died in 1921 and Grip was sold for $310 at New York's Anderson Galleries. She was eventually purchased by American businessman Richard Gimbel. When Gimbel died in 1970, his collection of Poe ephemera, including Grip, was left to the Rare Book Department of the Free Library of Philadelphia.

Grip spent 20 years in storage at the Free Library of Philadelphia, tucked away in a closet underneath a canvas labelled "The Most Famous Bird in the World". She underwent an extensive restoration in 1993 at the Academy of Natural Sciences of Drexel University. The desiccated carcasses of 12 beetles were found on her claws and in the enclosure. At least one of the beetles was a cigarette beetle (Lasioderma serricorne). The raven was fumigated and freeze-dried before being returned to the library. Grip is currently on display in the Rare Book Department on the third floor of the Free Library of Philadelphia's Parkway Central Library. She sits across the hallway from a mounted headstone for Dick, another pet bird, a canary, of Dickens who was buried at Gads Hill Place in Kent. During a visit to the library, Charles Dickens's great-great-grandson, Gerald Charles Dickens, pointed at her and said "Look at that beast, he's [sic] terrifying."

== Legacy ==
Grip was named a Literary Landmark by the American Library Association in 1999.

In addition to Dickens's later two ravens who were given the same name, many ravens have been named after Grip. Three of the Ravens of the Tower of London have been named for Grip, (Note: The ravens of the Tower of London have had their names spelt Gripp.) the latest in 2012.

A children's book about Grip, A Raven Named Grip: How a Bird Inspired Two Famous Writers, Charles Dickens and Edgar Allan Poe was written by Marilyn Singer in 2021.

== See also ==
- Jimmy (raven)
- List of individual birds
- Cultural depictions of ravens
