= Zenobia (ibis) =

Female northern bald ibis

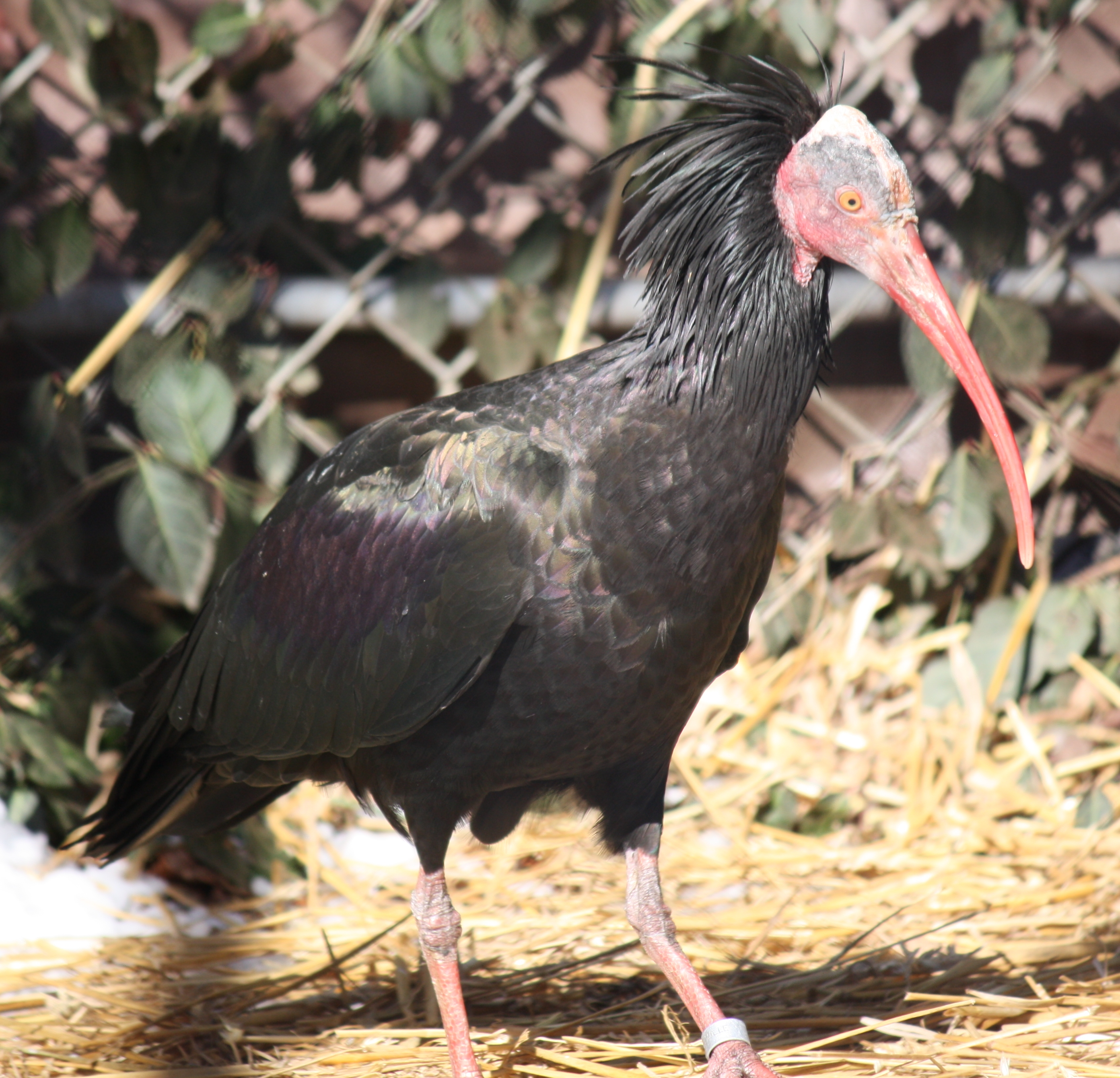
A northern bald ibis in an American zoo

Zenobia is the name given by researchers to a female northern bald ibis, one of the last surviving members of the species in Syria. She is believed to be the only remaining individual who knows the species' migratory route from Syria to wintering grounds in Ethiopia. The annual migration is fundamental to the continued survival in Syria of the species, which is close to extinction in the wild.

== Background ==
Zenobia, a female northern bald ibis, was named for Zenobia, a 3rd-century Queen of the Palmyrene Empire. She is an adult who has nested with her male companion Odeinat.

A 1930 survey reported 3000 individuals of the species around Birecik, Turkey, but in 1990 the wild population in Turkey was declared extinct, at least in part because of the use of dichlorodiphenyltrichloroethane (DDT) insecticide and other human activity. However, in the 1970s and 1980s a captive breeding population was established in the area; these birds were kept in aviaries during the winter, then released in the spring to mate and breed in nearby cliffs; in the autumn they were recaptured for the winter. Thus these birds could not survive without knowing the winter migration route used by members of the species in the wild.

The northern bald ibis was thought to be extinct in the Middle East until about 2005, when seven of the birds were spotted nesting near Palmyra. However, by 2012 the Palmyra population had declined to four, of which Zenobia is one.

== Ongoing threat ==
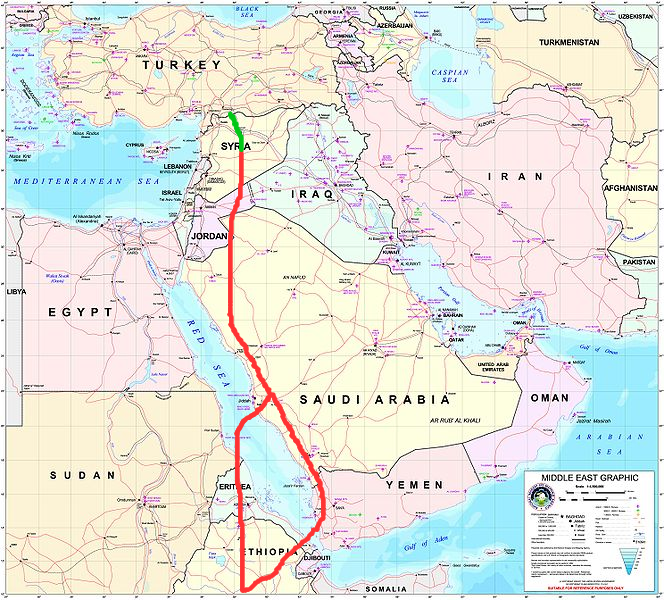
—Tagged Syrian breeders migrated south through Yemen in 2006 and returned via Eritrea. —Birds from Birecik visited the Syrian colony at Palmyra.

Guards loyal to Syrian President Assad, who were protecting some of the few remaining birds, fled Palmyra in mid-2015 as a result of fighting between Syrian government forces and the Islamic State of Iraq and the Levant; since that time, it is unknown whether the birds, including Zenobia, are still alive.

The British Broadcasting Corporation reported that Zenobia is "the only remaining bird who knows the migration routes to wintering grounds in Ethiopia. Without her, birds bred in captivity cannot learn the migration routes and the species could become extinct in the wild in Syria, according to ornithologists."

The Society for the Protection of Nature in Lebanon has offered a US$1,000 reward for information on the whereabouts of Zenobia.

== See also ==
- List of individual birds
