= Cosmo (parrot) =

African grey parrot

Cosmo (born 2002/2003) is a grey parrot who by the age of six had learned more than 200 words. She resides with Betty Jean Craige, University Professor Emerita of comparative literature and Director Emerita of the Willson Center for Humanities and Arts at the University of Georgia.

Cosmo is the subject of Betty Jean Craige's book called Conversations with Cosmo, for which animal cognition researcher Irene Pepperberg wrote the preface. Cosmo was the subject of a research study by Erin Colbert-White showing the "first demonstration" of an animal using a variety of speech and nonword sounds in a "deliberate, contextually relevant fashion" that goes beyond vocal imitation and approaches functional use.

== See also ==
- List of individual birds
