= Pierre (penguin) =

African penguin who lived at the California Academy of Sciences in San Francisco

- Species: Spheniscus demersus
- Sex: Male
- Hatched: February 16, 1983; Baltimore, Maryland, U.S.
- Died: May 6, 2016 (aged 33); San Francisco, California, U.S.

Pierre (February 16, 1983 – May 6, 2016) was an African penguin (Spheniscus demersus) who lived at the California Academy of Sciences in San Francisco. He was the first penguin to have bald spots restored.

== Life ==
Pierre hatched at the Maryland Zoo in Maryland in 1983 and was transferred in June to the Steinhart Aquarium facilities at the CAS, as a founding member of the Aquarium's penguin colony. In 1997, the then-14-year-old Pierre began coughing periodically, due to an allergic reaction inflaming the upper respiratory tract. He was subsequently treated with one or two daily doses of hydroxyzine. However, Pierre showed no other health issues.

On April 15, 2016, Pierre was diagnosed with renal failure. He died on May 6, 2016.

== Baldness and treatment ==
In June 2004, Pierre molted and did not regrow his feathers properly. Pierre, who was the alpha male in his colony, began to become antisocial, and was shunned by the other penguins. He wouldn't swim much, since the water was too cold and he would have risked developing potentially fatal hypothermia. The bald spots spanned his chest, a patch on his back, and his entire tail and head. Medical tests in 2007 revealed that there was no blood infection, the feather biopsies yielded all normal limits, and the only internal dysfunction seemed to be a low-grade kidney problem.

Senior aquatic biologist Pam Schaller developed a desire to help Pierre when she saw him shivering. She attempted warming him at first, both with extended time in the "sun pen" and later a heat lamp, and when a hormonal treatment of levothyroxine failed, she thought about how divers dress in cold waters—in wetsuits, which led her to design a wetsuit with the help of Oceanic Worldwide, a wetsuit manufacturer and children's costume seamstress Celeste Argel in 2007.

The new wetsuit was designed to protect Pierre from the bitter cold that would have otherwise killed him. It was sewn in the shape of a vest, to allow movement when waddling and swimming. The 3 mm-thick neoprene vest was fastened using Velcro. The neoprene material allowed for wet/dry movement and warmth. The colors white, brown, and black were all tested, but each one seemed to draw curiosity from the other penguins. Black was the most discreet option, so that color was chosen for the vest. The vest had holes for Pierre's wings so that he could move them freely. The Velcro fastener ran vertically on the vest, so that if Pierre should gain or lose weight, he would not need a new vest.

After several attempts and close observances, the suit was successfully fitted for Pierre. Other penguins began to stop harassing him after his receival of the vest. NPR's All Things Considered called him "the world's best-dressed penguin." Pierre would fully regrow his plumage by April 2008.

== See also ==
- List of individual birds
