= 3 Ring Circus =

1954 film by Joseph Pevney

- Theatrical release poster
- Directed by: Joseph Pevney
- Written by: Don McGuire; Joseph Pevney
- Produced by: Hal B Wallis
- Starring: Dean Martin; Jerry Lewis; Joanne Dru; Zsa Zsa Gabor; Sig Ruman
- Cinematography: Loyal Griggs
- Edited by: Warren Low
- Music by: Walter Scharf
- Production company: Paramount Pictures
- Distributed by: Paramount Pictures
- Release date: December 25, 1954
- Running time: 103 minutes
- Country: United States
- Language: English
- Box office: $4 million (US); 1,679,919 admissions (France)

3 Ring Circus is a 1954 American comedy film directed by Joseph Pevney and starring Dean Martin and Jerry Lewis. The picture was shot from February 17 to March 31, 1954, and was released at Christmas by Paramount Pictures. The supporting cast includes Joanne Dru, Zsa Zsa Gabor, Wallace Ford, Sig Ruman, Nick Cravat and Elsa Lanchester.

== Plot ==
Pete Nelson joins forces with his old buddy Jerome F. Hotchkiss and they take jobs with a circus. Jerry becomes an apprentice lion tamer, although he wishes to be a clown. Circus manager Sam Morley and Jill Brent, the owner and ringmaster, are facing financial problems, so Pete and Jerry must help wherever they are needed.

Jerry works with lion tamer Colonel Schlitz, who forces him into the lions' cage with only a whip and chair for protection. Schlitz exhorts Jerry to behave coolly and show no fear, but Jerry nervously tries to befriend the lions. Later in the day, Pete flirts with Jill and Jerry sneaks into Puffo the Wonder Clown's tent and tries some of his hats. Morley catches him in the tent and scolds him.

One night while working in a custard stand, Pete and Jerry are overwhelmed by the crowd and lose control of the machine. Morley sends Jerry to help Puffo dress for his performance, but Puffo rejects Jerry's help. Jerry's next assignment is to hand Nero, the tightrope walker, a unicycle. The audience roars with laughter at Jerry's fumbling attempts to climb a rope ladder while holding the bike. Jerry inadvertently rides the unicycle on the tightrope, and when he falls, he is a caught by a net.

Jill dislikes the egotistical, greedy trapeze performer Saadia, but Morley insists that the circus would go bankrupt without Saadia. To Jill's disgust, Pete becomes Saadia's personal assistant.

Morley convinces Jerry to become a human cannonball. Pete demonstrates his skills on the parallel bars for Saadia before they kiss. Jill interrupts to inform Saadia that, for financial reasons, there will be an extra show on Saturday. Saadia is aware that the survival of the circus depends on her, but she refuses to perform in the extra show. Pete, watching her perform to a capacity crowd, concocts an idea to save the circus.

Morley finally allows Jerry to perform in place of a sick clown. Jerry is ecstatic, but Puffo is displeased. He resents the cheap laughs that Jerry elicits from the audience and begins to bully him in the ring. The audience is upset and boos Puffo. After the show, Jerry tells Puffo that he is not angry with him.

After flirting with Jill, Pete asks her about the circus's profits and receives a slap. Soon after, Pete explains to Jill his plan to increase his profits with gambling. Jill is skeptical but allows Pete to arrange some gaming tables in the midway. On Jill's birthday, Pete and Jerry throw her a big party. An inebriated Puffo announces that he is quitting but that he will consider staying if Jerry and Pete are fired. Pete becomes angry and punches Puffo in frustration. Jill later fires Puffo and replaces him with Jerry.

Jerry starts performing under the name Jerrico. He is an instant hit with the audience, even bigger than Saadia, who is jealous and threatens to quit unless the circus fires Jerry. Tired of her ego, Pete tells her to "drive carefully" and sends her on her way. Jill is relieved to no longer compete with Saadia for Pete's affection.

Jill witnesses a fight between Pete's shell-game operator and a customer and then demands that Pete stop the gambling operation. Pete refuses and announces that he is leaving the circus. Sure that Jerry will follow Pete, Jill insists on leaving instead, preferring to leave the circus to Pete than to lose it entirely.

Jerry chastises Pete for canceling a benefit performance for disadvantaged children. Jerry tells Pete that he "ain't nice" anymore and quits. Jerry and the other clowns perform the show anyway, and Jill meets them at the outdoor arena. Jerry's words ring in Pete's head while Jerry performs and delights the children, causing a sad-faced handicapped girl to laugh. When a car arrives in the ring, Pete emerges dressed in a clown suit. Jerry and Jill are delighted to see Pete join the fun.

== Cast ==
- Dean Martin as Peter "Pete" Nelson
- Jerry Lewis as Jerome F. "Jerry" Hotchkiss
- Joanne Dru as Jill Brent
- Zsa Zsa Gabor as Saadia
- Wallace Ford as Sam Morley
- Sig Ruman as Colonel Fritz Schlitz, Lion Tamer
- Gene Sheldon as Puffo the Clown
- Nick Cravat as Timmy
- Elsa Lanchester as The Bearded Lady
- Jimmy the raven

== Production ==
The film was the second to be shot in VistaVision. A clip was included in a promotional short film titled Paramount Presents VistaVision.

An edited version removing the early military and circus scenes of Martin and Lewis together, as well as Martin's later music numbers, was released by Paramount in 1974 and shown at children's matinees. Retitled Jerrico the Wonder Clown, the abbreviated film lessened Martin's screen time and cast more emphasis on Lewis' character than had the original film.

== Reception ==
In a contemporary review for The New York Times, critic Howard Thompson wrote:

'Three Ring Circus,' the latest Paramount comedy vehicle for Dean Martin and Jerry Lewis, is significant, if not exactly distinguished, for one reason. The boys, at long last, are beginning to relax. Partly because the frenzy has subsided, and partly as the result of the spankingly pretty background of the big top, which VistaVision color cameras have stretched across a wide screen, the new arrival ... is as good-natured as it is harmless. However, for originality and genuine hilarity, the team still has quite a way to go.

Theatrical poster for the 1974 re-release.

== Home media ==
3 Ring Circus was the only Martin and Lewis film without a home-video release until August 2021, when it was released digitally on iTunes, Amazon Prime Video and Vudu.
