= Águia Vitória =

Mascot of Portuguese football club Benfica

Eagle Vitória
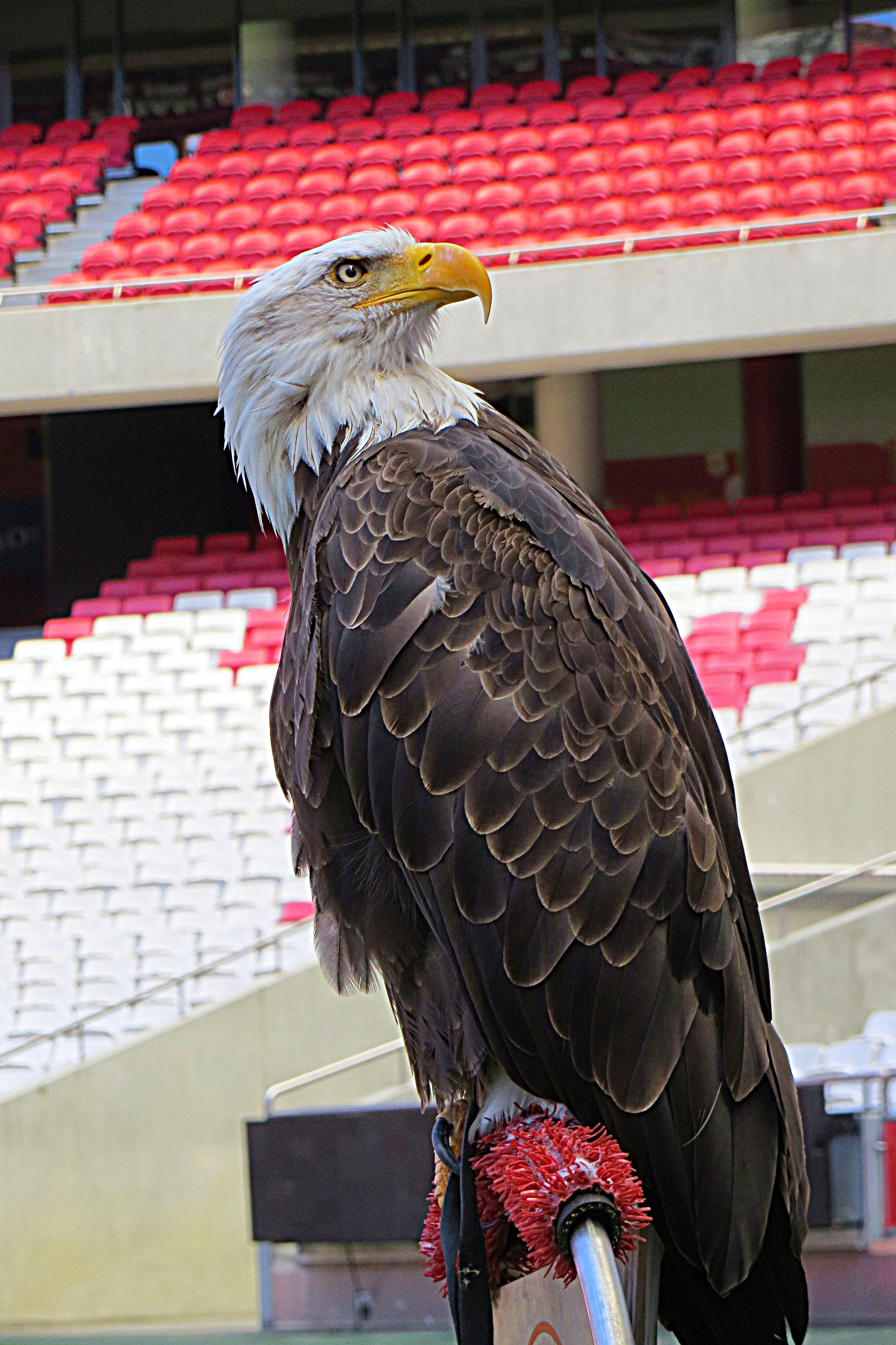
- Vitória in 2015
- Species: Haliaeetus leucocephalus
- Occupation: Mascot
- Known for: Mascot of S.L. Benfica

Águia Vitória is the mascot of Portuguese football club S.L. Benfica. Before every Benfica match at the Estádio da Luz, the eagle (águia) flies around the stadium and, in the vast majority of cases, eventually lands on top of the club's crest without the eagle symbol, completing it. On occasion, the exhibition flight does not go as expected, with the eagle missing the landing or flying out of the stadium.

Vitória is a bald eagle (Haliaeetus leucocephalus), trained by André Rodrigues since April 2011. The original eagle Vitória, whose trainer was Juan Bernabé, flew in the inauguration of the Estádio da Luz on 25 October 2003. It was apprehended days later and released in May 2006. In the meantime, it was replaced by a similar eagle with the same name.

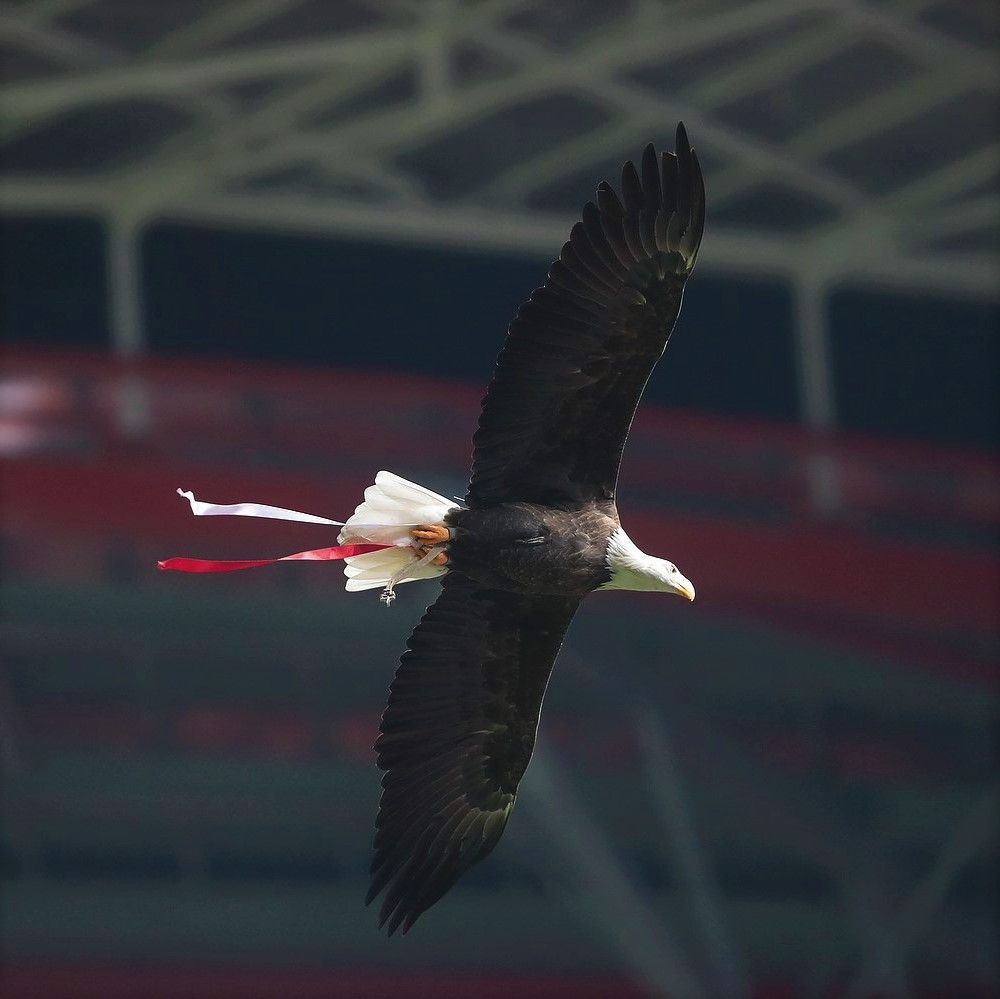
The eagle flying at Estádio da Luz before a UEFA Champions League match in 2019

Gloriosa is another eagle that flies in the stadium, where the eagles actually live. They carry red and white ribbons, the club's colours.

== See also ==
- List of individual birds
