= Greater (flamingo) =

Oldest known flamingo, died in captivity in Adelaide Zoo

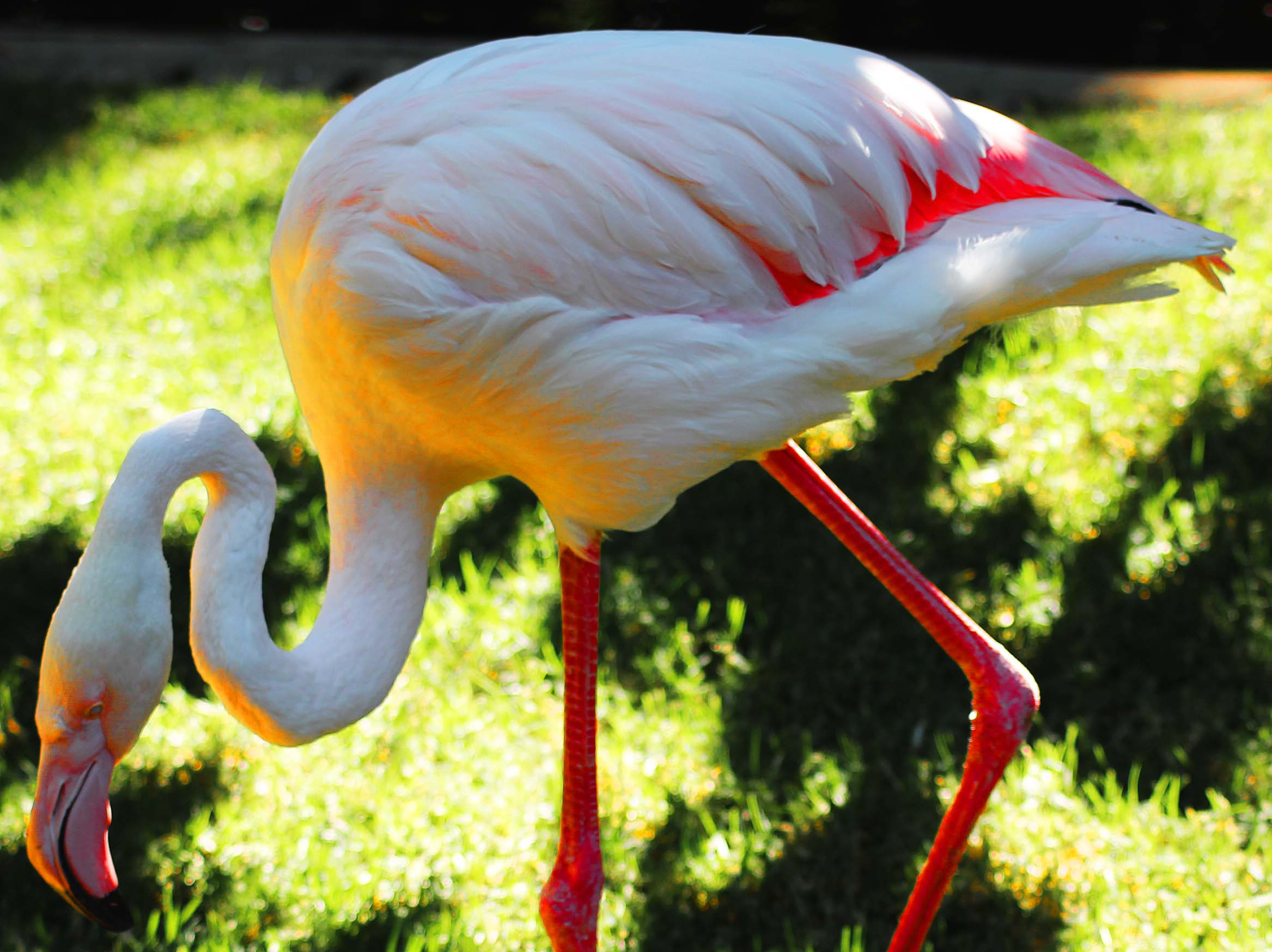
- "Greater" in April 2013
- Other name: Flamingo One Flamingo 1
- Species: Phoenicopterus roseus
- Sex: Undetermined
- Hatched: Unknown
- Died: January 30, 2014 (estimated age 83–95); Adelaide Zoo, Adelaide, Australia

Greater, also known as Flamingo One and Flamingo 1 (died January 30, 2014), was the world's oldest greater flamingo (Phoenicopterus roseus), residing at the Adelaide Zoo in Adelaide, Australia. It was at least 83 years old, having arrived at the zoo from either Cairo or Hamburg (records are unclear) in either 1933, 1930, 1925, or 1919 (the dates of the last four importations of greater flamingos to the Adelaide Zoo), at which point it was already a full-grown adult. Greater's sex was never determined.

On October 29, 2008, Greater was attacked and beaten by four teenagers. The almost-blind bird was badly injured, but soon recovered. Its assailants were arrested, and initially charged with ill-treatment of an animal; however, all charges were later dropped and nobody was prosecuted.

In April 2013, zoo personnel noticed that Greater was beginning to show signs of arthritis, which they attempted to treat with medication. However, in late January 2014, Greater's health deteriorated even further, and the decision was made to euthanize Greater. At the time of its death, Greater was the only greater flamingo in captivity in Australia; there is a moratorium on the importation of flamingos into Australia.

Greater's remains were subsequently donated to the South Australian Museum to be taxidermied; however, due to the technical challenges of preserving the physical traits of such an old flamingo, and a shortage of sufficiently flamingo-like birds on which to practice new techniques, this was not accomplished for several years. Greater finally went on display at the Museum in 2021, alongside the remains of "Chile", the oldest Chilean flamingo on record, who had lived alongside Greater at the Adelaide Zoo for over thirty years.

== See also ==
- List of individual birds
