= Woof Woof (tūī) =

Bird able to formulate human sounds (1994 or 1995 – 5 February 2011)

- Species: Prosthemadera novaeseelandiae
- Sex: Male
- Born: 1994 or 1995
- Died: 5 February 2011 (aged 16); Whangārei, New Zealand
- Known for: Being able to replicate human speech
- Owners: Robyn and Robert Webb

Woof Woof (1994 or 1995 – 5 February 2011) was a tūī who gained national attention for his ability to formulate human sounds.

== Biography ==
Looked after by Robyn and Robert Webb, Woof Woof lived at Whangārei Native Bird Recovery Centre, after being blown out of his nest by a storm and wedged in a crook of a tree at five days old. He damaged his wing, resulting in an inability to fly. Unable to be released, Woof Woof recovered, and after eight weeks inside, he was moved into an indoor aviary for public education.

Woof Woof was first noted imitating human sounds when he was about two years old. His owner, Robert Webb, walked into the aviary, only to be greeted by the tūī stating: "Hello Woof Woof." With an accent almost identical to Robert, Woof Woof knew several other phrases, such as "Where've you been?," or "How's your cold?" Woof Woof also knew when Christmas was nearing, and was known to say "Merry Christmas" a week or two before the festive season.

Tūī are known to constantly pull sounds from their environments, with young birds being noted to pick up human noises and adding them to their song. The process occurs more frequently in male birds, however, there have been cases among females. Although this process can occur, it is rare for tūī to talk and engage in conversations, like Woof Woof could.

Woof Woof soon gained popularity after videos surfaced of him talking on YouTube, with one video recording him singing the tune of a Pizza Hut advertisement. He was also known to pass on his conversational abilities to fellow tūī. Jet, who had a damaged wing, and Little Tui, who was blind in one eye, were able to replicate some of Woof Woof's phrases, at the age of 18 months, after spending a few months in a cage next to Woof Woof.

Woof Woof died on 5 February 2011 at the age of 16. He is believed to be the oldest known tūī on record. Woof Woof was buried in his owners' backyard, next to his "mate," a kiwi named Spotty.

== See also ==
- List of individual birds
