= List of individual birds =

This is a list of well-known real birds. For famous fictional birds, see the list of fictional birds.

== Birds of prey ==
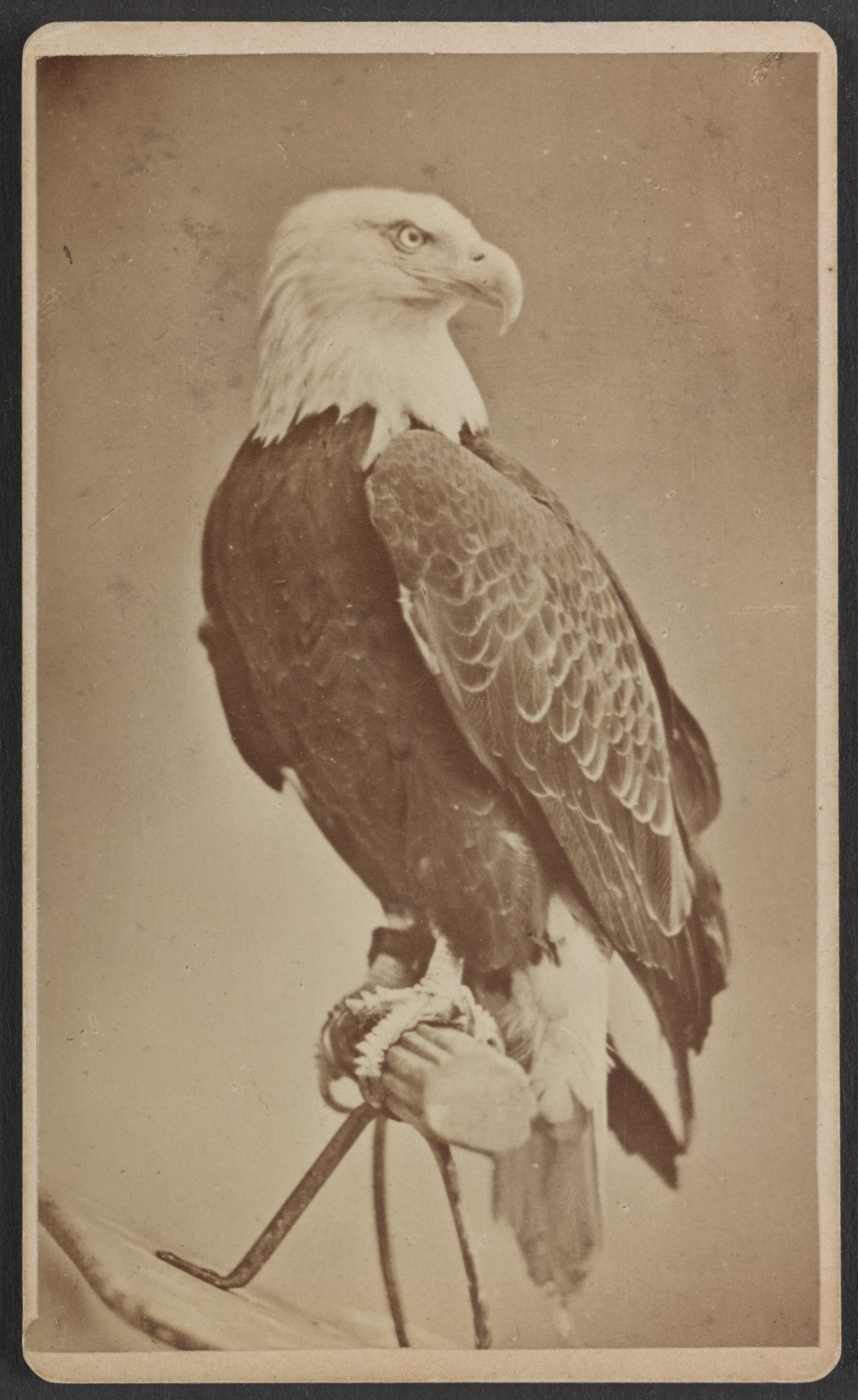
Old Abe, mascot of the 8th Wisconsin Volunteer Infantry Regiment with the Union Army in the American Civil War

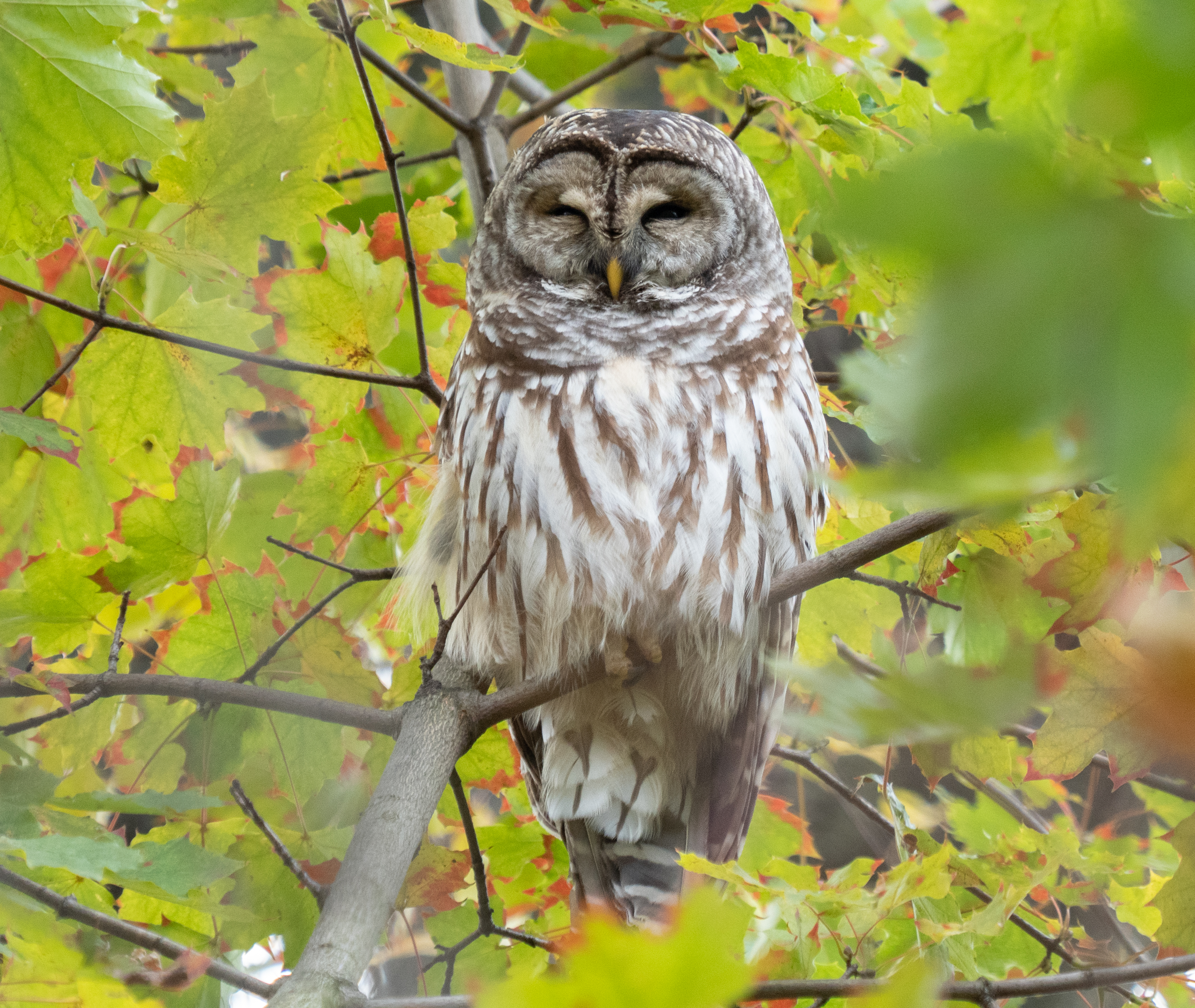
Barry, a barred owl which took up residence in Central Park until she was killed in 2021

- Águia Vitória, a bald eagle who serves as the mascot for Portuguese football club S.L. Benfica
- Barry, a barred owl who lived in Central Park in New York City
- Challenger, the first bald eagle in history trained to free fly into major sporting events during the American national anthem
- Flaco, a Eurasian eagle-owl which escaped from the Central Park Zoo after its enclosure was vandalized in February 2023. Died in 2024 after colliding with a window.
- Gladys, a Eurasian eagle-owl which escaped from the Minnesota Zoo after a routine exercise and training session. Died in 2021 after a possible impact involving a vehicle.
- Goldie, a golden eagle who lived at the London Zoo in the 1960s and caused a sensation when he briefly escaped in 1965
- Harriet and Ozzie, a devoted pair of bald eagles in North Fort Myers, Florida, whose lives were followed by people in over 190 countries via the Southwest Florida Eagle Cam
- Jackie and Shadow, a pair of bald eagles whose nest in Big Bear Valley is live streamed, capturing its egg laying, brooding, and hatching efforts
- Lady Baltimore, a bald eagle living at the Juneau Raptor Center
- Mr Rutland, an osprey introduced to England after the species went extinct there in the 1840s
- Old Abe, an American Civil War bald eagle who was the mascot of a Wisconsin regiment, whose image was adopted in Case Corporation's logo and as the screaming eagle on the insignia of the U.S. Army's 101st Airborne Division
- One Wing, a one-winged bald eagle that survived the 1989 Exxon Valdez oil spill
- Pag-asa, the first Philippine eagle to be bred and hatched in captivity
- Pale Male, a red-tailed hawk who lived near Central Park in New York City
- Peter, a bald eagle who lived at the Philadelphia Mint during the 1830s
- Rufus, a Harris's hawk used by the All England Lawn Tennis and Croquet Club to keep pigeons away from their venue

== Landfowl ==
- Astoria, a wild turkey who has resided in New York City since 2024
- Booming Ben, the nickname of the last confirmed Heath hen found on Martha's Vineyard, who was presumed dead after a final sighting in 1932.
- Matilda, the world's oldest known chicken
- Mike the Headless Chicken, a Wyandotte rooster of Fruita, Colorado, who lived for 18 months after his head was cut off. The botched decapitation in 1945 missed his brain stem and jugular vein. His owners fed him thereafter with an eyedropper, and took him on tours of the West Coast. He died in 1947.
- Zelda, a wild turkey who lived at the Battery in New York City from 2003 to 2014

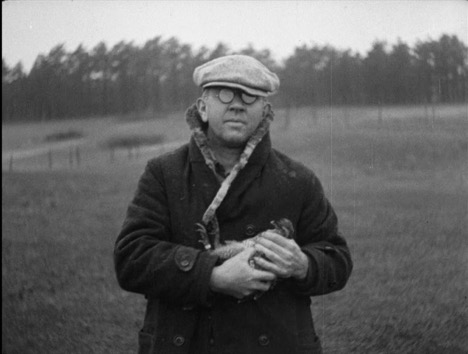
Alfred Otto Gross, holding Booming Ben

== Parrots ==
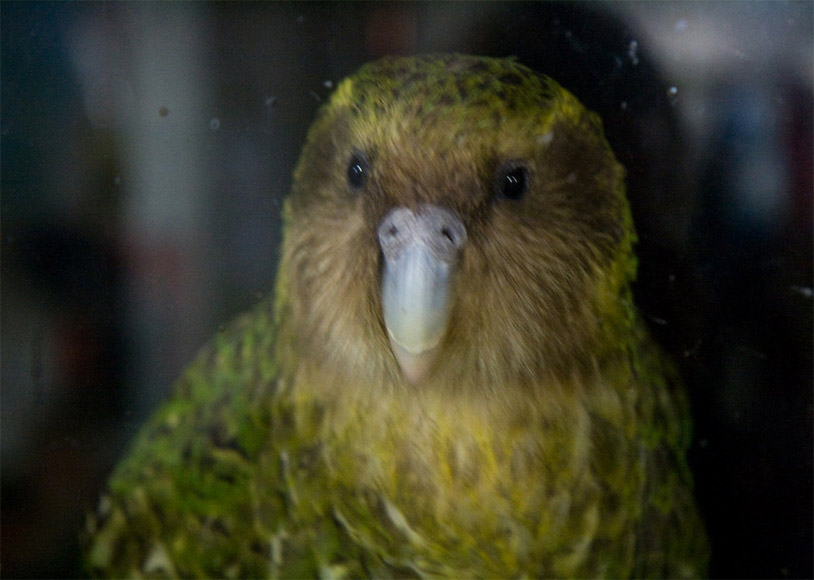
Sirocco, a kākāpō which appeared in a popular BBC television series

- Alex, a grey parrot who, in studies by Dr. Irene Pepperberg, demonstrated an ability to count; differentiate categories involving objects, colors, shapes, and materials; and understand the concept of same and different
- Apollo, a grey parrot and subject of a YouTube channel
- Bud, an African gray parrot believed to mimic an argument before a murder
- Charlie, a blue-and-yellow macaw whose owner claimed she belonged to Winston Churchill and had been taught to shout curses at Nazis
- Cookie, a Major Mitchell's cockatoo who at the time of his death at the age of 83, was recognized by Guinness World Records as the oldest living parrot in the world
- Cosmo, a grey parrot known for knowing over 200 words and being the subject of a book, Conversations with Cosmo
- Douglas, a scarlet macaw who played the parrot Rosalinda in the 1970 film Pippi in the South Seas
- Incas, the last Carolina parakeet, who died in 1918 at the Cincinnati Zoo, reportedly of grief after his mate Lady Jane died a few months before him, in 1917
- Louis, a macaw known for preventing development of his owner's estate from 1949 to 1966
- Mani, a rose-ringed parakeet living in Singapore, who became famous in 2010 after correctly predicting the winners for all of the 2010 FIFA World Cup quarter-final ties
- N'kisi, a grey parrot known for her supposed advanced use of the English language
- Poll, a pet parrot of Andrew Jackson known for shouting profanities at his funeral
- Ravachol Parrot, a parrot who lived in Pontevedra, Spain, from 1891 and 1913 and became a symbol of the city
- Sirocco, a hand-reared kākāpō who became an ambassador for his species and conservation in New Zealand.
- Snowball, a male Eleonora cockatoo, noted as being the first non-human animal conclusively demonstrated to be capable of beat induction
- Sparkie Williams, a talking budgerigar who provided the inspiration for an opera by Michael Nyman and Carsten Nicolai
- Whipper, a budgerigar known for its unusual appearance, caused by a genetic mutation

== Passerines ==
- Anchorage White Raven, a popular leucistic raven that lived in Anchorage, Alaska
- Canuck, a northwestern crow who was voted Metro Vancouver's unofficial ambassador
- Dick the Mockingbird, a mockingbird belonging to Thomas Jefferson and believed to be the first presidential pet to live in the White House
- Domino Day 2005 sparrow, a house sparrow who was shot and killed after disturbing preparations for Domino Day 2005
- Orange Band, the last dusky seaside sparrow. Died on Walt Disney World’s Discovery Island in 1987
- Grip, a raven kept as a pet by Charles Dickens which was used as a character by Dickens and likely inspired Edgar Allan Poe's 1845 poem "The Raven"

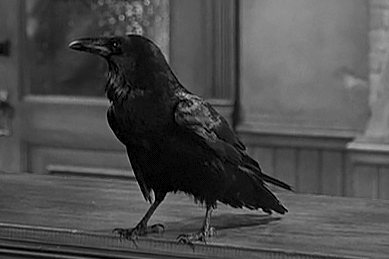
Jimmy, a raven, appearing in the 1946 film It's a Wonderful Life

- Jimmy, a raven who appeared in more than 1,000 feature films from the 1930s through the 1950s, including It's a Wonderful Life and The Wizard of Oz
- Mozart's starling, a common starling kept as a pet by Wolfgang Amadeus Mozart
- Old Blue, a black robin who at one point was the only fertile female of the species
- Woof Woof, a male tūī that was able to formulate human sounds

== Penguins ==
- Dindim, a Magellanic penguin who became internationally famous for swimming 5,000 miles every year to visit Joao Pereira de Souza, the Brazilian man who rescued him from an oil spill in 2011. Inspired the film My Penguin Friend.
- Grape-kun, a Humboldt penguin living at the Tobu Zoo who became famous for his attachment to a cutout of an anime character
- Nils Olav, a king penguin, mascot and colonel-in-chief of the Norwegian King's Guard
- Pesto, a king penguin from the Sea Life Melbourne Aquarium
- Pierre, an African penguin who became the first penguin to have bald spots restored
- Roy and Silo, a same-sex pair of male chinstrap penguins who lived at the Central Park Zoo
- Sphen and Magic, a same-sex pair of male gentoo penguins who lived at the Sea Life Sydney Aquarium

== Pigeons ==
=== War pigeons ===
War pigeons were homing pigeons selectively bred and trained to carry messages in military operations. Some received honors for their service.

- All Alone, a Second World War homing pigeon awarded the Dickin Medal, the animal equivalent of the Victoria Cross
- Beach Comber, a Second World War homing pigeon awarded the Dickin Medal
- Billy, a Second World War homing pigeon awarded the Dickin Medal
- Broad Arrow, a Second World War homing pigeon awarded the Dickin Medal

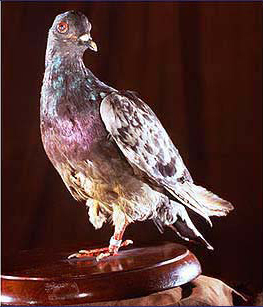
Taxidermied Cher Ami, a war pigeon, in the Smithsonian Institution

- Cher Ami, British-bred homing pigeon who, in the autumn of 1918, delivered 12 messages for the U.S. Army during World War I, among other things helping to save the Lost Battalion
- Cologne, a Second World War homing pigeon awarded the Dickin Medal
- Commando, a Second World War homing pigeon awarded the Dickin Medal, who carried out more than ninety missions carrying intelligence for the British
- DD.43.Q.879, a Second World War homing pigeon awarded the Dickin Medal
- DD.43.T.139, a Second World War homing pigeon awarded the Dickin Medal
- Duke of Normandy, a Second World War homing pigeon awarded the Dickin Medal
- Dutch Coast, a Second World War homing pigeon awarded the Dickin Medal
- Flying Dutchman, a Second World War homing pigeon awarded the Dickin Medal
- G.I. Joe, a Second World War homing pigeon awarded the Dickin Medal, a member of the United States Army Pigeon Service. On 18 October 1943, the village of Calvi Vecchia, Italy was scheduled to be bombed by the Allies. He carried the message that British forces had captured the village, thus averting the attack and saving the lives of over a thousand people, both the local Italians and the British occupying troops.
- Gustav, a Second World War homing pigeon awarded the Dickin Medal
- John Silver, a First World War homing pigeon known for receiving an eye patch and a wooden leg
- Kenley Lass, a Second World War homing pigeon awarded the Dickin Medal
- Le Vaillant, a First World War homing pigeon used by the French Army
- Leaping Lena, a West German racing pigeon who became lost in Czechoslovakia during a routine flight in 1954 and returned bearing a note on her leg with an anti-communist message
- Navy Blue, a Second World War homing pigeon awarded the Dickin Medal
- NPS.42.NS.2780, a Second World War homing pigeon awarded the Dickin Medal
- NPS.42.NS.7524, a Second World War homing pigeon awarded the Dickin Medal
- NURP.38.BPC.6, a Second World War homing pigeon awarded the Dickin Medal
- NURP.43.CC.1418, a Second World War homing pigeon awarded the Dickin Medal
- Mary of Exeter, a Second World War homing pigeon awarded the Dickin Medal
- Maquis, a Second World War homing pigeon awarded the Dickin Medal
- Paddy, a Second World War homing pigeon awarded the Dickin Medal
- Princess, a Second World War homing pigeon awarded the Dickin Medal
- Royal Blue, a Second World War homing pigeon awarded the Dickin Medal
- Ruhr Express, a Second World War homing pigeon awarded the Dickin Medal
- Scotch Lass, a Second World War homing pigeon awarded the Dickin Medal
- Tommy, a Second World War homing pigeon awarded the Dickin Medal
- Tyke, a Second World War homing pigeon awarded the Dickin Medal
- White Vision, a Second World War homing pigeon awarded the Dickin Medal
- William of Orange, a Second World War homing pigeon awarded the Dickin Medal
- Winkie, a Second World War homing pigeon awarded the Dickin Medal

=== Other pigeons ===
- Joe, a pigeon found in Australia believed to have flown there from Oregon. He was originally at risk of being euthanized, but was ultimately pardoned after it was found he likely came from Australia and did not pose a biosecurity risk

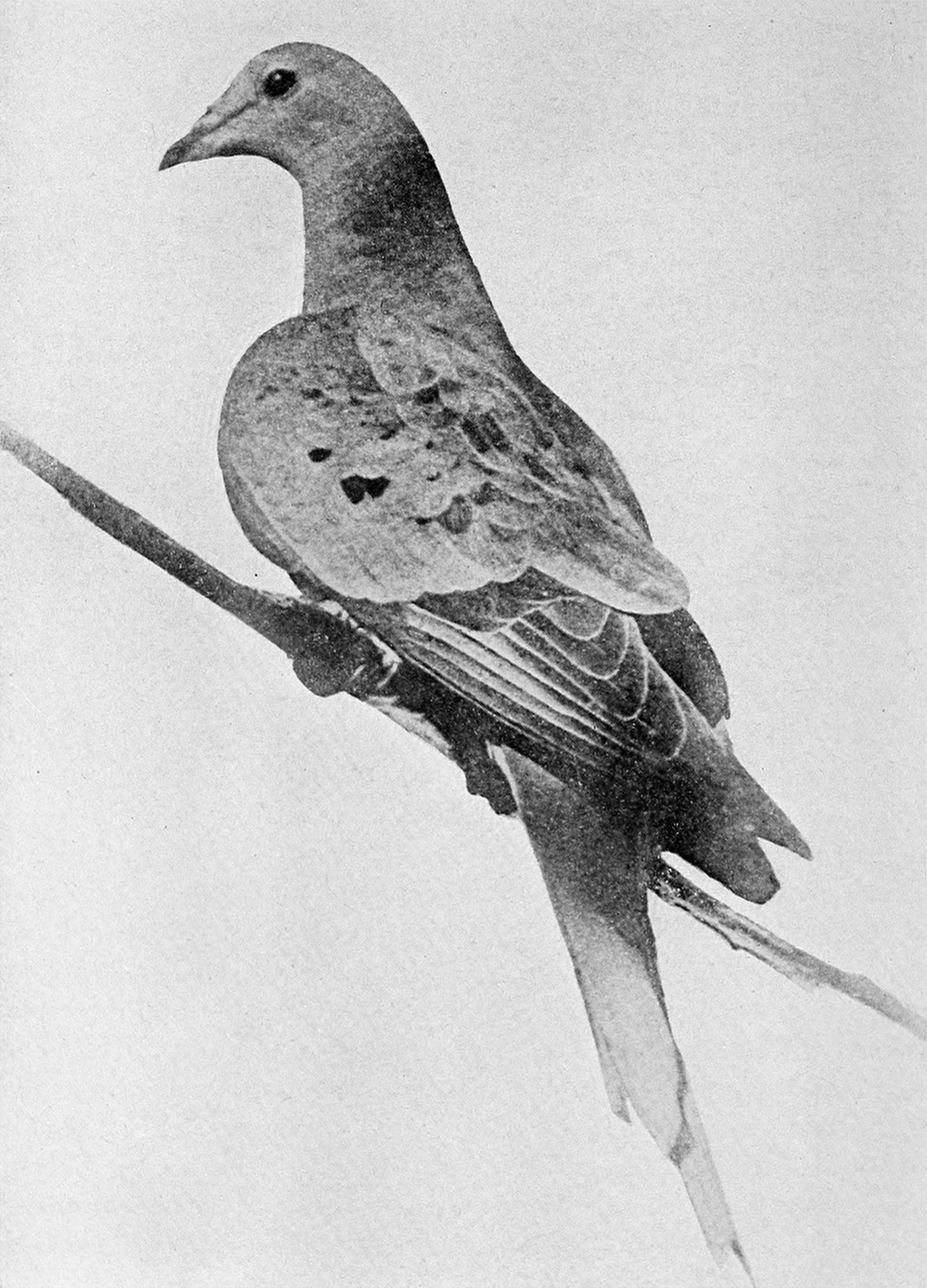
Martha in its enclosure

- Martha, the last passenger pigeon. Died at the Cincinnati Zoo in 1914
- The King of Rome, a successful racing pigeon who set a long-distance pigeon racing record in England

== Ratites ==
- Emmanuel, an emu popular on TikTok
- Manukura, the first white kiwi born in captivity
- Paora, a brown kiwi who lives at Zoo Miami

== Waterfowl ==
- Andy, a goose born without feet who used sneakers to help him stand and walk. He was killed by an unnamed perpetrator in 1991.
- Gertie the Duck, a mallard duck who nested on some pilings under a bridge in Milwaukee in 1945. She (and her brood) are immortalized in RiverSculpture!
- Long Boi, an Indian Runner-mallard duck cross and unofficial mascot of the University of York who became famous due to his height (70 cm tall)
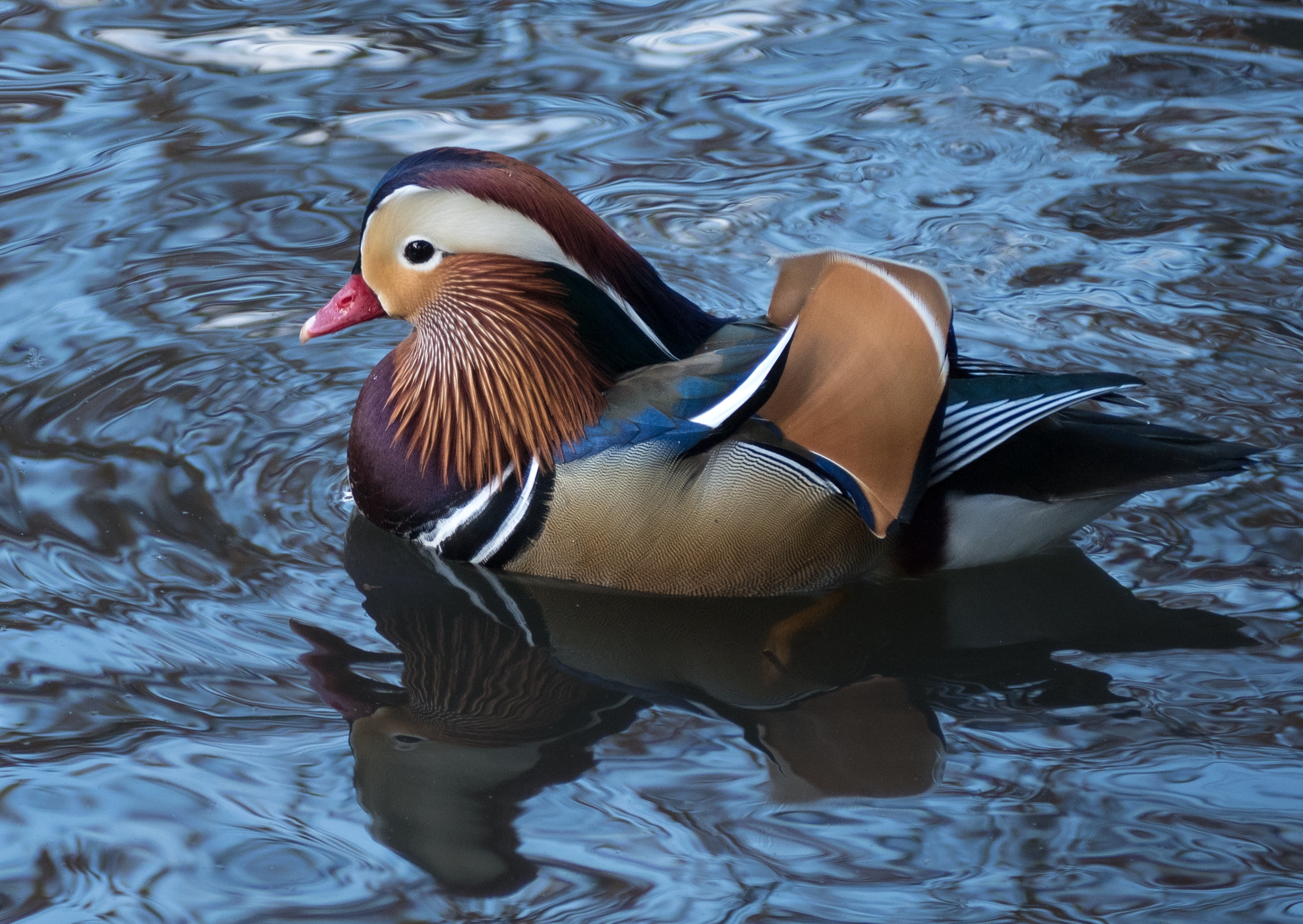
  The Central Park mandarin duck, also known as Mandarin Patinkin or Hot Duck
- Herbie, a duck who became known in the 1970s after a clip of him skateboarding was shown on BBC news program Nationwide
- Mandarin Patinkin (also known as Hot Duck), a mandarin duck which appeared in New York City's Central Park in 2018.
- Mario, a Toulouse goose, formerly living in Echo Park, Los Angeles, who became the subject of news reports in 2011 after forming an unusual association with a local resident
- Petra, a black swan who appeared to fall in love with a pedalo resembling a swan
- Ripper, a musk duck known for imitating human speech
- Sergeant Siwash, a duck that served in the United States Marine Corps.
- Trevor, a vagrant duck that lived on Niue, hundreds of kilometres from any other duck
- Victoria, the first goose to receive a prosthetic beak
- Wrinkle, an American Pekin duck and emotional support animal who gained prominence on social media for participating in the New York City Marathon.

== Other species ==
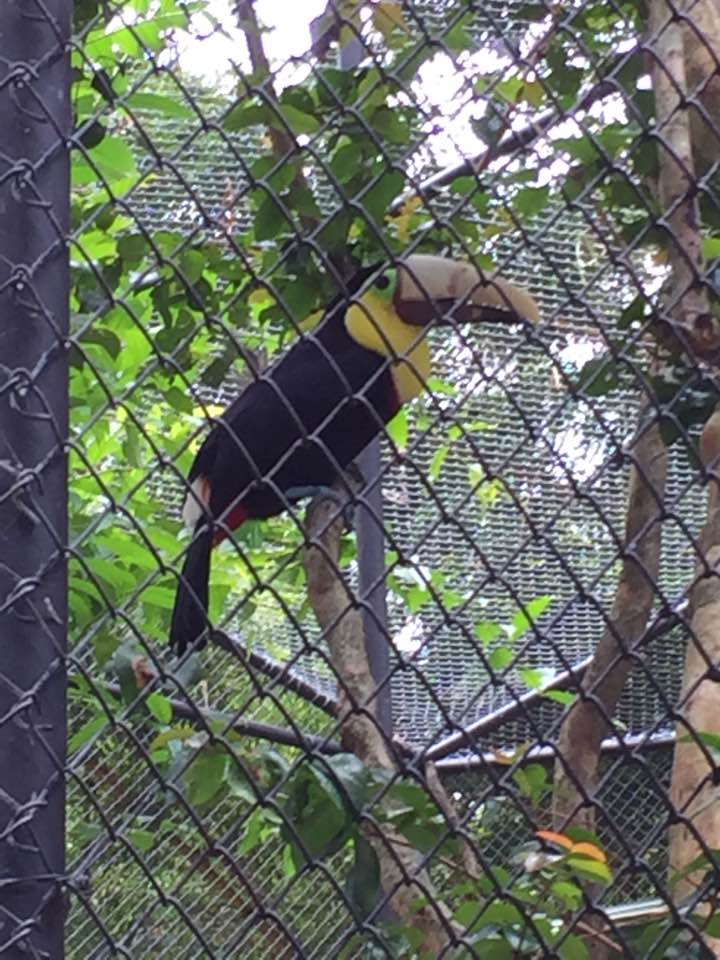
Image of Grecia and her prosthetic beak in the Rescate Wildlife Rescue Center in 2016

- B95, a red knot known for being the oldest known member of his species
- Greater, a greater flamingo, the oldest flamingo on record, who died in 2014 at the Adelaide Zoo, aged at least 83
- Grecia, the first toucan to receive a prosthetic beak after an attack by a group of youths. She resided in Rescate Wildlife Rescue Center in Costa Rica.
- Klepetan and Malena, a pair of white storks renowned for their romantic endeavors
- Monty and Rose, a pair of piping plovers who in 2019 were the first pair to successfully breed in Chicago in decades
- Mr Percival, an Australian pelican and notable film actor
- Omid, the only Siberian crane that continues to return to Iran

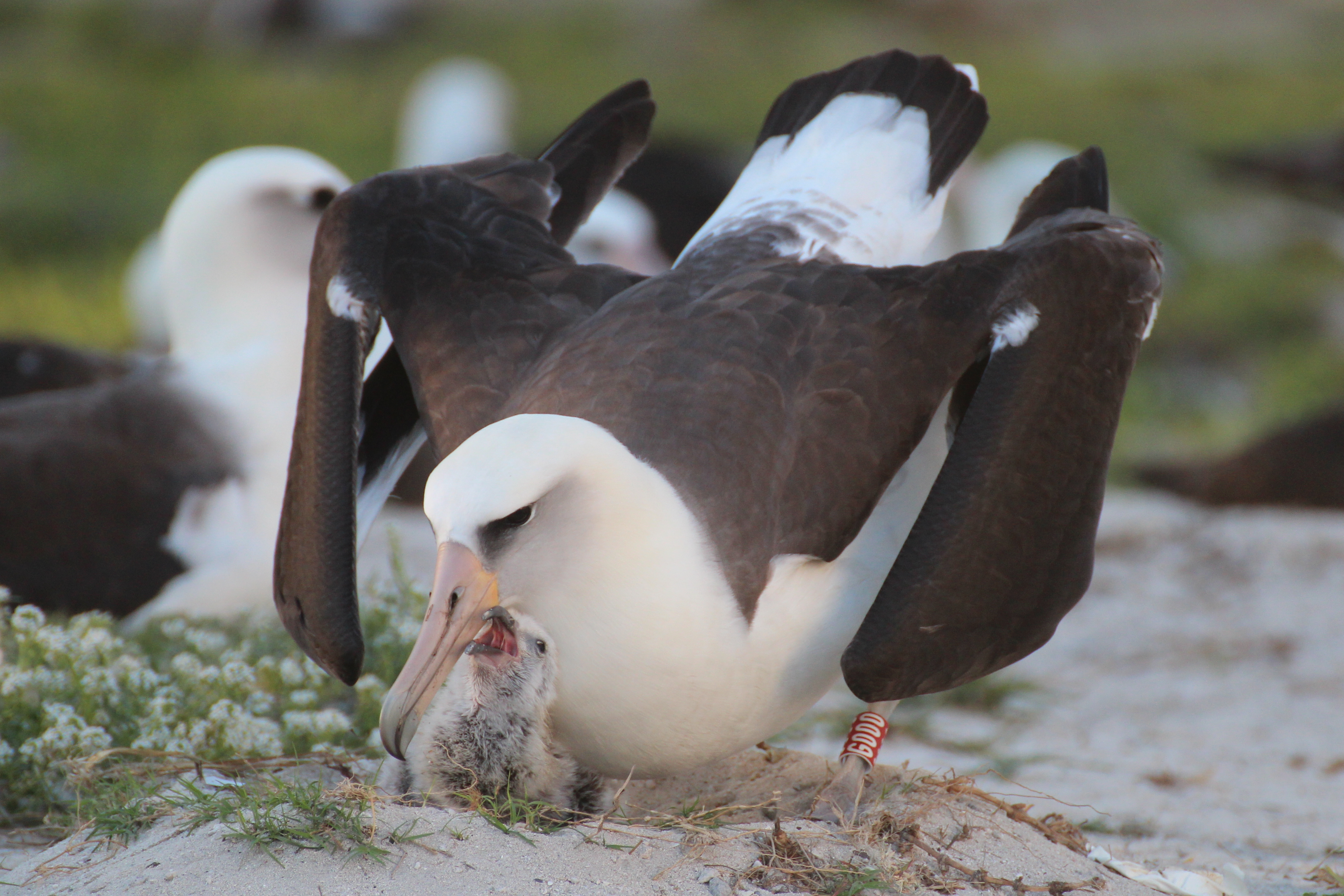
Wisdom, a Laysan albatross and the oldest confirmed wild bird

- Petros, a pelican who became a mascot of the Greek island of Mykonos
- Pink Floyd, the name given to two separate flamingos who escaped from captivity in the United States and lived in the wild for many years
- Wisdom, a wild female Laysan albatross. She is the oldest confirmed wild bird in the world as well as the oldest banded bird in the world.
- Yaren, a stork known for its friendship with a fisherman living in Eskikaraağaç village of Bursa, Turkey
- Zenobia, one of the last northern bald ibises in Syria

== See also ==
- The cliff swallows that return to Mission San Juan Capistrano every year around mid-March
- The gulls living at Japan's Kabushima Shrine
- The gulls who saved Mormon pioneers from a cricket infestation in 1848
- Hollywood Freeway chickens, a feral colony living under the Hollywood Freeway Vineland Avenue off-ramp in Los Angeles
- Parrots of Pasadena, a population of non-indigenous feral parrots in Pasadena
- The Wild Parrots of Telegraph Hill, 2003 documentary about a flock of feral parrots in San Francisco and a man who cares for them.
- Peabody Ducks of Memphis, a group who every morning are escorted from their penthouse palace to the lobby fountain, and every evening are escorted back
- Peace Bridge robins, a family that nested on Peace Bridge in the 1930s
- Ravens of the Tower of London, a group whose continuing presence is said to protect the Crown and with it Great Britain
- War Eagle bird, a golden eagle live mascot for Auburn University
