= Jimmy (raven) =

20th-century raven actor

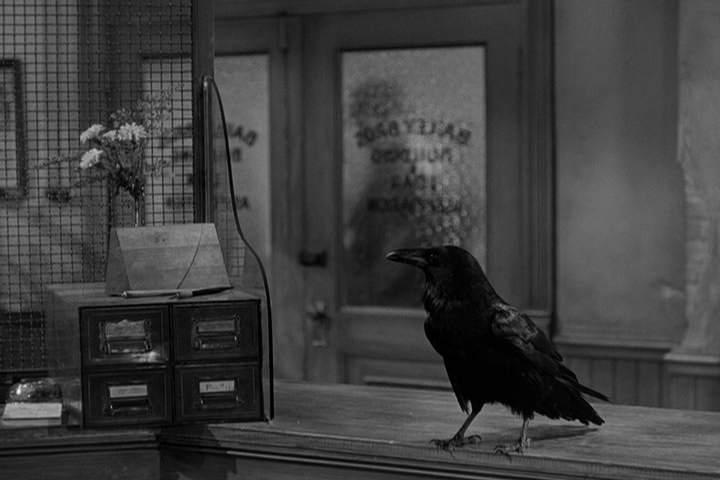
- Jimmy appearing in It's a Wonderful Life
- Other name: Jimmy the crow
- Species: Corvus corax
- Breed: Common raven
- Sex: Male
- Hatched: Jimmy c. 1934; Mojave Desert
- Died: after 1954
- Occupation: Animal actor
- Years active: 1938–1954
- Tricks: typing, opening letters, motorcycle riding
- Owner: Curly Twiford

Jimmy (often erroneously credited as Jimmy the Crow) was a raven actor who is reported to have appeared in more than 1,000 films from the 1930s to the 1950s.

== Career ==
He first appeared in You Can't Take It with You in 1938. Director Frank Capra would then cast the bird in every subsequent movie he made. Among his roles were Uncle Billy's pet, seen in the Building & Loan in It's a Wonderful Life (1946), and the crow that landed on the Scarecrow in The Wizard of Oz (1939).

Jimmy belonged to Hollywood animal trainer Curly Twiford, who found the bird in a nest in the Mojave Desert in 1934. Twiford trained Jimmy to do an assortment of tricks, such as typing and opening letters. He could even ride a tiny motorcycle. These talents would make him appealing to use in films. Jimmy could understand several hundred words, though only around 50 were what Twiford called "useful". It took Jimmy a week to learn a new useful word, two weeks if it had two syllables. Twiford said that Jimmy could perform any task possible for an 8-year-old child.

His human co-stars were complimentary of the bird. "When they call Jimmy, we both answer," remarked Jimmy Stewart on the set of It's a Wonderful Life, noting that the raven "is the smartest actor on the set" requiring fewer re-takes than his human counterparts.

After he had become more popular with the studio, Metro-Goldwyn-Mayer had Jimmy insured for $10,000. Lloyd's of London wrote a policy to cover Jimmy's $500 a week fee as well as Curly Twiford's $200 handler fee, in the event Jimmy forgot any of the words he would need on the set. Twiford credited these fees with keeping him solvent during World War II. At one point, Jimmy had 21 "stand-ins", 15 of which were female, who would fill in for him when the scene did not require any tricks or movement.

Jimmy received a Red Cross gold medal in acknowledgement of 200 hours spent entertaining veterans after the war, and his footprints were enshrined in cement at a large Los Angeles pet store, alongside those of Lassie and other Hollywood animal stars. Jimmy's last-credited film was 3 Ring Circus in 1954, after which little is known about him. Curly Twiford said that Jimmy would "probably live to be 150" years old, which the papers re-printed. In reality, ravens seldom live more than 30 years in captivity. Curly Twiford died on April 5, 1956, at the age of 60.

== See also ==
- Bird intelligence
- Grip (raven)
- List of individual birds
