= Petros (pelican) =

Individual pelican who was the mascot of Mykonos

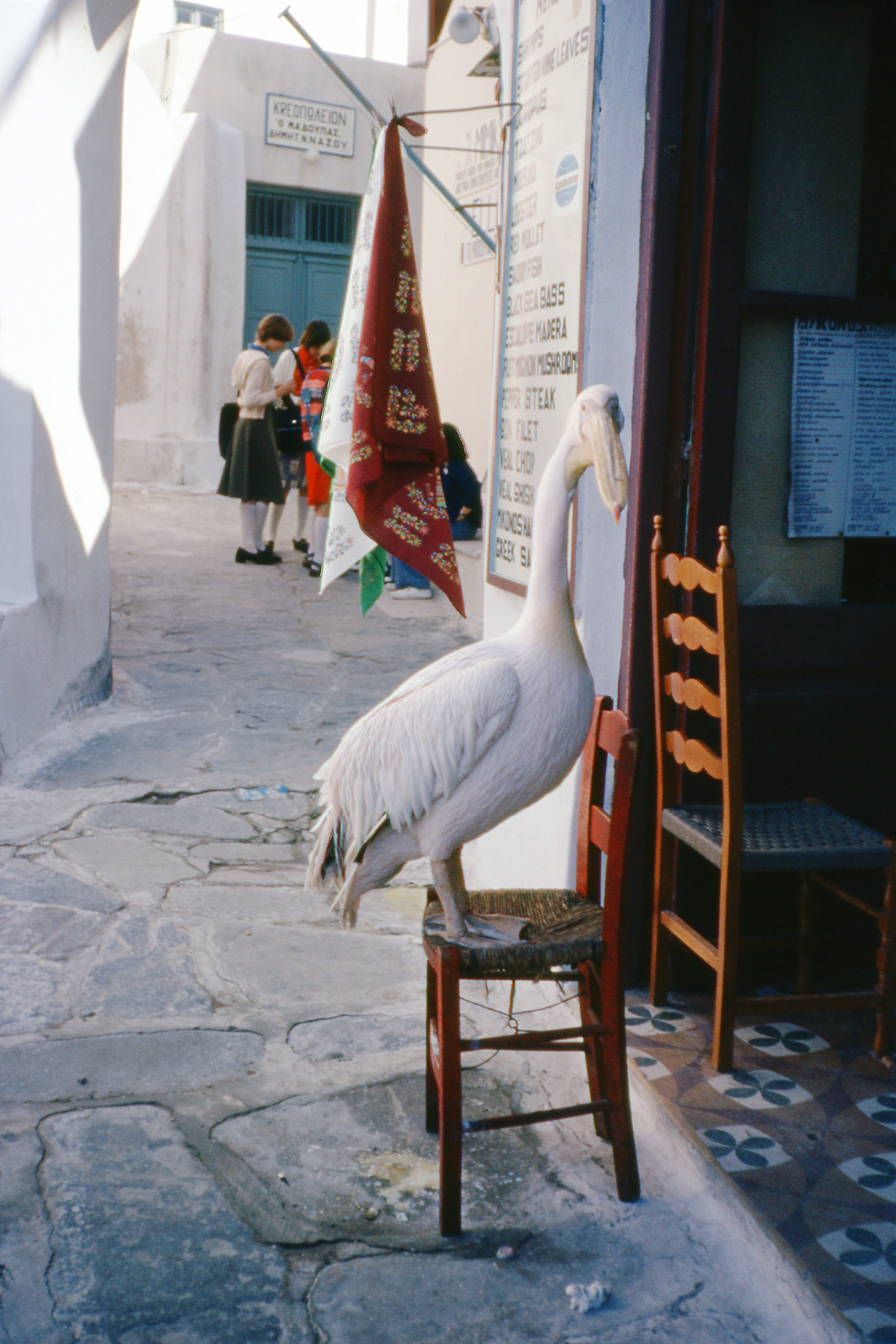
Original Petros in 1977

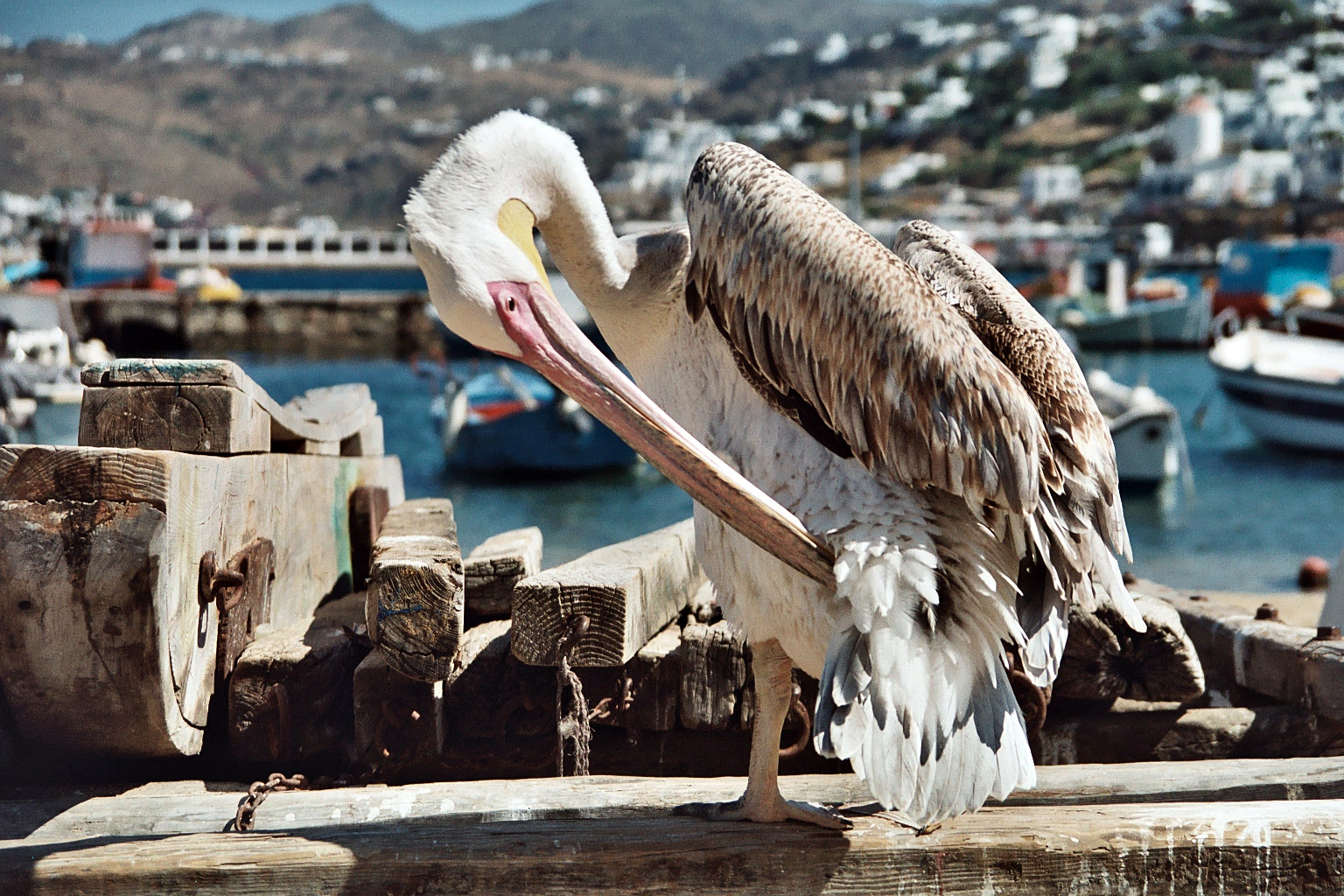
Petros (the second)

Petros was a great white pelican. It was the official mascot of the Greek island of Mykonos.

In 1958, a wounded pelican was found off the coast of Mykonos by a local fisherman. The pelican was nursed to health and remained on the island supported by locals. It soon adopted the name "Petros", as a joke among locals. Petros was hit and killed by a car in December 1985.

Subsequently, three new pelicans took up residence around the main town of Mykonos. One, honorifically, was given the name "Petros".

== See also ==
- List of individual birds
