= Omid (crane) =

Only remaining Siberian crane of the western population

Omid (Persian: امید, Pronounced: "Umeed" meaning "Hope") was a male Siberian crane, notable for being the only remaining Siberian crane of the western population (a larger eastern population winters in China). He kept returning to its wintering grounds in Iran, after flying 6,000 km (3,700 mi) each year, since the winter of 2006-2007. He would usually spend four months in Fereydunkenar wetland on the Caspian Sea, northern Iran.

== See also ==
- List of individual birds
