= Manukura (kiwi) =

Kiwi (2011–2020)

Manukura (1 May 2011 – 27 December 2020), a North Island brown kiwi, was the first pure white kiwi born in captivity. After Manukura's hatching, two additional white birds were also born in captivity.

Manukura was born in the Pukaha / Mount Bruce National Wildlife Centre. The bird was born in May 2011 with a rare genetic condition that made it all white, instead of brown.

She was named by Rangitāne leader Mike Kawana; her name is the Māori word for "chiefly status".

Manukura was believed to be a male for the first year of life, but then caretakers discovered she was a female bird. In 2014, Manukura was caught on film engaging in a noisy mating ritual which involved her "beating" her male partner.

She died in December 2020 after having surgery to remove her ovaries and an unfertilised egg that she struggled to pass naturally.

== Legacy ==
Author Joy Cowley wrote a children's book, illustrated by Bruce Potter, about Manukura in 2012. Toy manufacturers and New Zealand museums created plush replicas of the rare bird over the years.

== See also ==
- List of individual birds
- Mapuna, another white kiwi
