= Victoria (goose) =

Individual goose

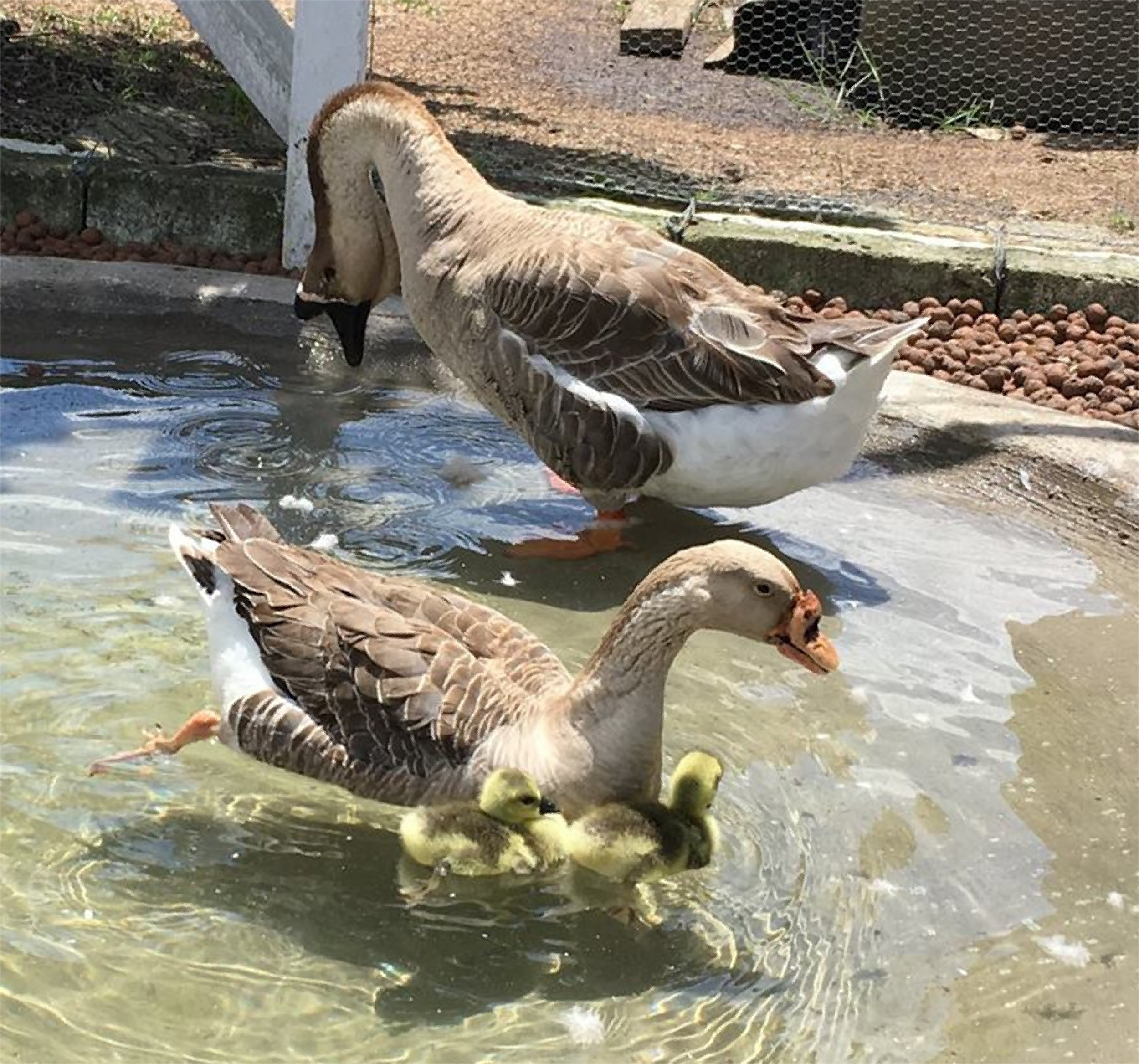
- Species: Swan goose (Anser cygnoides)
- Sex: female
- Hatched: Brazil
- Known for: First goose prosthetic beak

Victoria is the first goose to receive a prosthetic 3D printed beak. Victoria was found on the São Paulo coast in late 2015, without most of her beak. She was transferred to the care of the Friend of the Sea in collaboration with Animal Avengers, when Cícero Moraes was still part of the team. It is not clear how Victoria lost her beak. A 3D printed prosthetic beak was attached by veterinarians of the University of São Paulo.

== Gallery ==
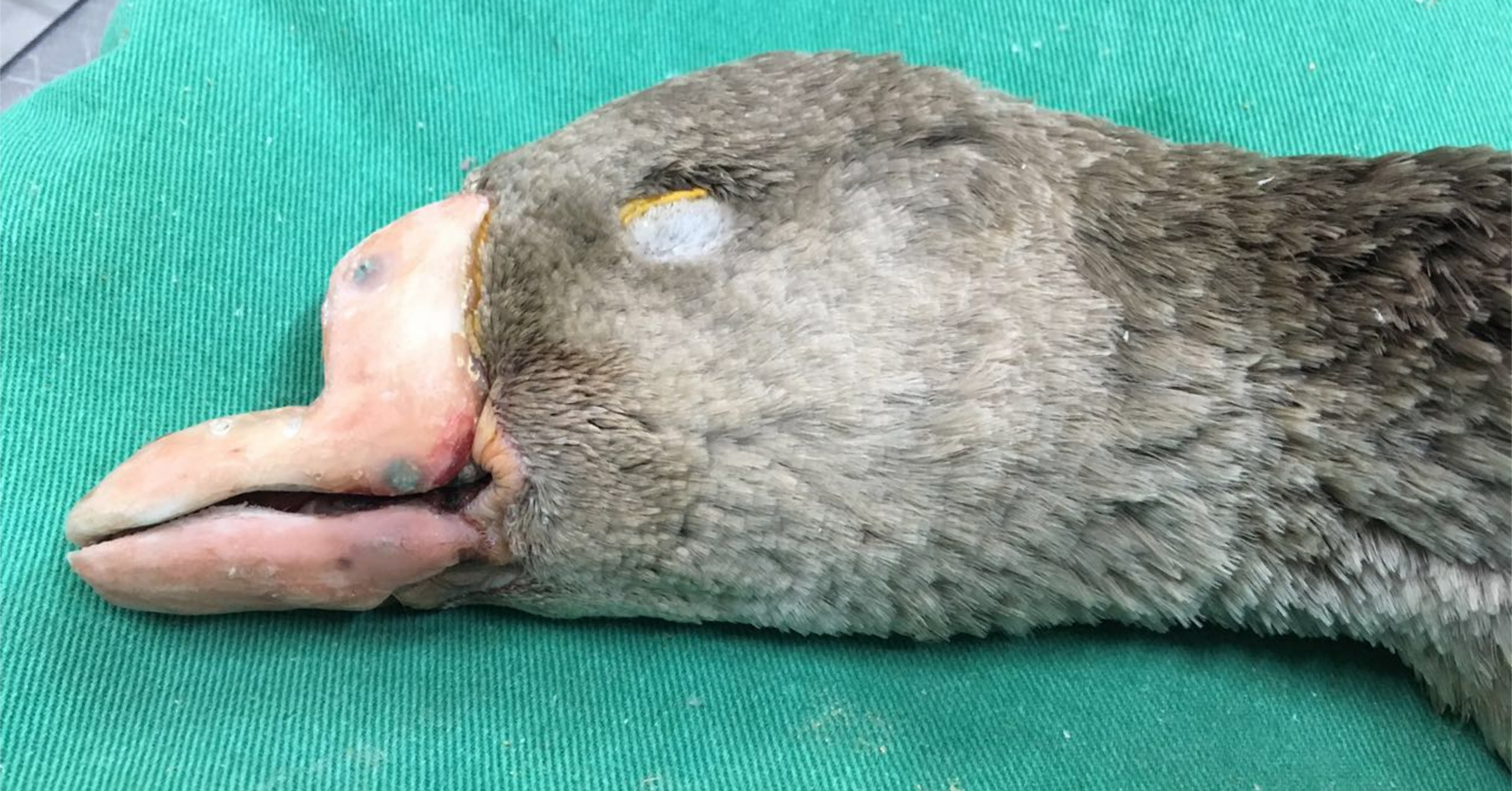
Victoria

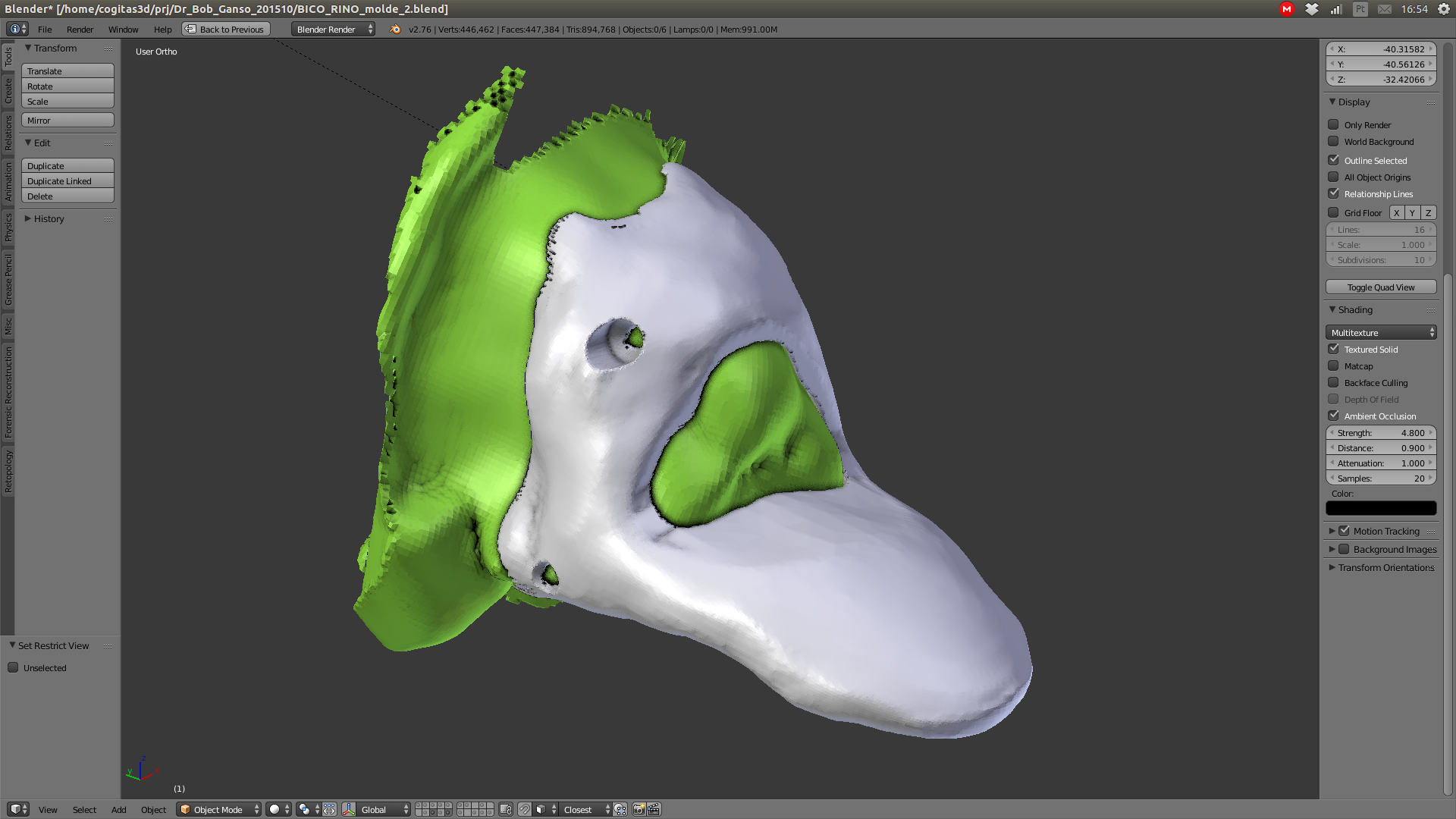
3D beak modeled

3D object of the modeled and printed beak

== See also ==
- List of individual birds
