= List of things named after Joe Biden =

List of things named after President of the United States Joe Biden

This article lists things named after Joe Biden, the 46th president of the United States. Holding various political offices over the last 50 years, he previously served as a New Castle County councilman in Delaware (1971–1973), a seven-term United States senator (1973–2009), and a two-term vice president under the 44th president, Barack Obama (2009–2017).

== Institutions and locations ==
=== Educational institutions ===
- In 2017, Biden established the Biden Institute, a policy center at his alma mater, the University of Delaware.
- The University of Delaware renamed its public policy school the Joseph R. Biden, Jr. School of Public Policy & Administration in 2018.
- In 2017, the University of Pennsylvania established the Penn Biden Center for Diplomacy and Global Engagement, which is based in Washington, D.C.

=== Other facilities ===
- The Biden Welcome Center, a welcome center along Interstate 95 in Christiana, Delaware, was named after the Biden family in 2018 by a state legislative resolution.
- In 2017, the pool in Brown-Burton-Winchester Park in Wilmington, Delaware was renamed the Joseph R. Biden Jr. Aquatic Center. It had previously been known as the Prices Run Pool, and Biden himself served as the only white lifeguard there in the summer of 1962. Biden has said he took the job at the pool, which is in a predominantly black neighborhood, to try to learn more about the black community.
- The Joseph R. Biden Jr. Railroad Station, an Amtrak and SEPTA Regional Rail station in Wilmington, Delaware, was renamed in Biden's honor in 2011.
- The Biden Environmental Center in Cape Henlopen State Park is named after Joe Biden.
- The Joseph R. Biden Jr. Presidential Library is a planned presidential library focused on Biden's presidency.

=== Streets/highways ===
- Biden Street in Scranton, Pennsylvania, renamed from Spruce Street in 2021
- Joe Biden Way, in Scranton, Pennsylvania, renamed from North Washington Avenue in 2020
- President Biden Expressway in Scranton, Pennsylvania, renamed from Central Scranton Expressway in 2021

== Science ==
=== Astronomical object ===
- The discovery of the minor planet 2012 VP113 was announced in 2014. Because its name includes "VP", which often stands for "Vice President", the astronomers who discovered the planet nicknamed it Biden, after the then-Vice President of the United States.

=== Organisms ===
- Joe the Pigeon, an individual tumbler pigeon from Australia.
- Syllipsimopodi bideni, a fossil basal species of vampire squid found in Carboniferous Bear Gulch Limestone in Montana, was named "... to celebrate the recently inaugurated (at the time of submission) 46th President of the United States, Joseph R. Biden" by paleontologists Christopher D. Whalen and Neil H. Landman, of the American Museum of Natural History.

== Fiction and the arts ==
- Joe Biden, a fictional character from The Onion, abstractly parodying Biden
- TrumporBiden2024, a Twitch channel featuring fictionalized versions of Biden and Donald Trump engaging in comedic political debate
- Say it Ain't So, Joe, a chamber opera in two acts by Curtis K. Hughes (inspired by the 2008 United States vice presidential debate)

== Other ==
- In 2017, Cornell University named a flavor of chocolate chip vanilla ice cream Big Red, White, and Biden in Biden's honor. Deanna Simons, academic program coordinator at Cornell Dairy, got the idea after one of her interns told her that Biden loved ice cream. After delivering a speech at Cornell's Convocation that year, Biden tasted the ice cream named after him, which he described as "really good".

== See also ==
- Presidential memorials in the United States
