= Matilda (chicken) =

World's oldest chicken (1990–2006)

- Hatched: 1990
- Died: February 11, 2006 (aged 15–16)
- Known for: World's oldest chicken
- Owners: Keith and Donna Barton
- Awards: Induction in to the "Alabama Animal Hall of Fame"

Matilda (1990 – February 11, 2006) was a fourteen-ounce (400 g) hen, and the first chicken to receive the title of World's Oldest Living Chicken from Guinness World Records. She is thought to have been descended from the Red Pyle color variation of the Old English Game breed. She was a pet of Keith and Donna Barton of Bessemer, a suburb of Birmingham, Alabama.

Matilda's name was taken after the Australian folk song "Waltzing Matilda", and given to her as a result of her penchant for stepping side to side (as if she were waltzing) against the wire panels on the sides of her cage. Unlike most hens, Matilda never produced eggs. Her veterinarians believed Matilda's lack of egg production contributed significantly to her extraordinarily long lifespan of sixteen years.

Another contributing factor to Matilda's longevity was her having lived the majority of her life indoors, inside a large wire cage, where she had a stable, protected environment year-round.

== Magic career ==
On October 19, 1990, Keith and Donna went to the Alabama State Fairgrounds in Fairfield, Alabama, and paid $10 (equivalent to $25 in 2025) to purchase Matilda from Steve Shaffield of Warrior, Alabama.

Under the stage names of Mort The Mystifying and Donna, Keith and Donna were pursuing their goal of becoming professional magicians, and Matilda was part of their plan. On June 5, 1991, she made her debut performance in Keith's and Donna's magic show.

To make Matilda magically appear, Keith would produce an egg from two cardboard tubes, which were shown empty and then nested one inside the other. After cracking the egg, dropping its contents into an empty pan, and adding a few drops of hot sauce, Keith would place the lid on the pan and immediately lift the lid to reveal Matilda. Her magic career would span well over a decade.

== Celebrity status ==
=== World's Oldest Living Chicken ===
Considering that the average lifespan of a chicken is generally no more than seven to eight years, in 2001, Keith and Donna contacted Guinness World Records, at which point Matilda was eleven years old. After the documentation of Matilda's age had been verified and substantiated, Guinness World Records proclaimed fourteen-year-old Matilda to be World's Oldest Living Chicken on April 27, 2004. Keith and Donna were presented with a congratulatory letter and official certificate from Guinness World Records.

Matilda's title of World's Oldest Living Chicken is recorded in the data banks at Guinness World Records, but has not been included in their books or on their website.

=== The Tonight Show ===
Following their appearance on The Tonight Show; Keith, Donna, and Matilda pose with host Jay Leno. (September 2004)

As a direct result of Matilda's receiving the title of World's Oldest Living Chicken, Keith, Donna and Matilda were guests of The Tonight Show in an episode that taped and aired on September 9, 2004. Also appearing on the show were Terry Bradshaw, Jim Brown and Howie Long. Musical guests were Kirk Franklin and Yolanda Adams. Matilda, who was accustomed to performing on stage, strutted on top of Jay's desk, nibbled breadcrumbs, played with her favorite toy, and did a well-received impersonation of the NBC peacock.

== Ambassador of good will ==
Following her appearance on The Tonight Show, Matilda became an ambassador of good will, appearing as an honored guest at numerous charitable events in Birmingham, Alabama, including:

- Blessing of the Animals at St. Martin's in the Pines (October 3, 2004) (October 2, 2005)
- Tails and Art Benefit for the Alabama Animal Foundation (October 17, 2004)
- Wet Nose Ball for TEARS (The Emergency Animal Rescue Service) (May 14, 2005)
- Picasso Pets for Hand-in-Paw (August 28, 2005)

=== Olivia Bearden Award ===
On September 22, 2005, the Greater Birmingham Humane Society held their annual awards luncheon at The Club in Birmingham, Alabama. The Olivia Bearden Award, which recognizes the specific service of an animal to another living creature (human or animal), was presented to Matilda. Magically appearing to accept her award, Matilda perched on top of the plaque as it was held by Keith.

== Death ==
Due to age-related health problems, Matilda retired from show business on October 17, 2005, and died of heart failure, at the age of sixteen, on February 11, 2006.

== Posthumous honors ==
=== Broken Perch Ceremony ===
To honor Matilda's contributions to the world of magic, a Broken Perch Ceremony was conducted on Saturday, August 5, 2006. The ceremony, which was held at the Hilton Birmingham Perimeter Park Hotel in Birmingham, Alabama, was hosted by the Southeastern Association of Magicians and Ring 35 of the International Brotherhood of Magicians. Based on the Broken Wand Ceremony, which was initially performed in 1926 at the funeral of Harry Houdini, the Broken Perch Ceremony for Matilda was the first time that a magician's animal had been formally recognized and honored by the magic community.

Bob Sanders, President of Ring 35, officiated at the ceremony; Jacque Meyer, executive director of the Greater Birmingham Humane Society, delivered the eulogy; and Bill Pitts, Past President of the International Brotherhood Of Magicians, conducted the Broken Perch ritual. In honor of Matilda's many accomplishments, Bob Sanders presented Keith and Donna with a Commendation, which had been drafted by Alabama Governor Bob Riley.

=== Alabama Animal Hall of Fame ===
The Alabama Veterinary Medical Association inducted Matilda into the Alabama Animal Hall of Fame on September 9, 2006, at a black tie dinner, which was held at Embassy Suites Montgomery Hotel in Montgomery, Alabama. The ceremony was exactly two years to the date on which Matilda had appeared on The Tonight Show. Two dogs, Gucci and Muffin, were also inducted.

== See also ==
- List of individual birds
