= Kenley Lass =

Pigeon receiver of the Dickin Medal

Kenley Lass was a war pigeon who received the Dickin Medal in 1945 from the People's Dispensary for Sick Animals for bravery in service during the Second World War. Kenley Lass received the award after it was the first pigeon to deliver intelligence from an agent in enemy-occupied France in October 1940. After parachuting in with the agent, Kenley Lass was released after 12 days and made the 300 mile flight back home in less than 7 hours.

She was bred in Poynton, Cheshire and owned by Donald Cole from Cirencester.

== See also ==
- List of individual birds
