= Canuck the Crow =

Celebrated bird and unofficial 2018 ambassador of Vancouver, Canada

Canuck the Crow (hatched 2015 – disappeared 30 August 2019) is a human-habituated wild Northwestern crow from East Vancouver, British Columbia, who became locally well known due to his close relationship with people and various stunts including stealing a knife from a crime scene and riding the Vancouver SkyTrain. He was voted Metro Vancouver's unofficial ambassador in 2018 and disappeared in August 2019.

== Biography ==
=== Notoriety ===
As a hatchling, Canuck was pushed from his nest. He was rescued and raised by a young boy in Vancouver, who took care of him until he could fly and attached a red zip-tie to his leg before letting him free in 2015.

Canuck was well known in his neighbourhood, but first went viral in September 2015 when he landed on a cyclist and started investigating his backpack. During a soccer tournament at Empire Field, Canuck landed on spectator's shoulders, tried to take personal items including keys, and drank Tim Horton's coffee.

In January 2016, Global News producer Nick Logan filmed Canuck travelling via the Vancouver SkyTrain, an automated rapid transit system. He had entered on Millennium Line at the Commercial-Broadway station and got off in East Vancouver, having also done so on two dates prior.

On 24 May 2016, Canuck stole a knife from a crime scene and interrupted a police investigation. Police had been responding to a burning vehicle when a man came at them with a knife and was subsequently shot and brought to hospital. While police were still on the scene, Canuck picked up the dropped knife, but dropped it before flying off. During another police investigation, Canuck investigated the parked police motorcycles and entered a police van, in which he defecated.

Due to the visibility and uniqueness of Canuck's actions, he became legendary in Vancouver. He was named by CBC viewers as Metro Vancouver's unofficial ambassador in 2018, beating out actor Michael J. Fox with 81% of the final vote.

=== Personal life ===
In March 2017, Canuck was beaten unconscious on a soccer pitch by a man using a flagpole. He was nursed back to health by veterinarian Anne McDonald. Canuck mated with a female crow named Cassiar and had two broods in May and June 2019. The first brood died due to a predatory bird attack but the second was successful. One of the chicks, named Gord after late Canadian singer-songwriter Gord Downie, was plucked from the nest by another crow, but was rehabilitated and adopted by another crow pair in Maple Ridge.

=== Disappearance ===
Canuck was last seen on 30 August 2019. His mate Cassiar remained at their nest site, calling for him to return. Shawn Bergman, the operator of Canuck's social media profiles, posted a $10,000 reward for the safe return of Canuck, with money gathered from anonymous donations. Bergman and others have expressed belief that Canuck was kidnapped. Wildlife biologist and crow specialist John Marzluff has stated that the chances Canuck is still alive are slim. Reports of dead crows matching Canuck's description have remained unverified. Vancouver police are not investigating the disappearance.

== See also ==
- List of individual birds
