= John Silver (pigeon) =

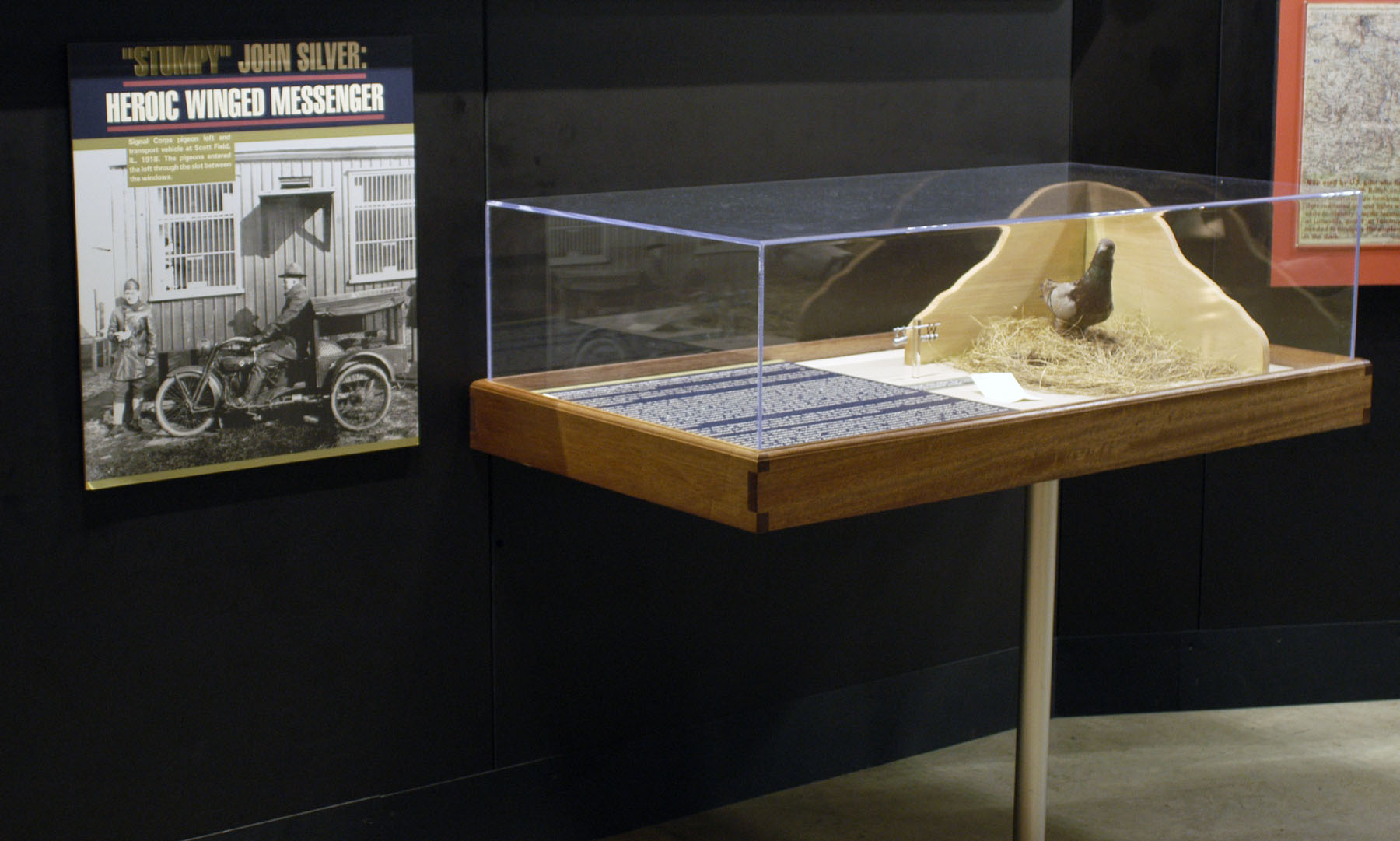

John Silver was a war pigeon active with the United States Army in World War I. He served with distinction during World War I. He was knocked out of the air twice by cannon flak, but he got back up both times and completed his mission. He lost an eye and a leg, so he was given an eye patch and a wooden leg; this led to his being named after Long John Silver, the famous fictional pirate who also only has one leg. He is also wearing the medal he was awarded. As of 2010, the animal is on display at the National Museum of the United States Air Force near Dayton, Ohio.

== See also ==
- List of individual birds
