= Wrinkle (duck) =

Emotional support animal and marathon runner

Wrinkle Five Star
- Species: Domestic mallard (Anas platyrhynchos domesticus)
- Breed: American Pekin
- Sex: Male (Female pronouns used)
- Hatched: September 9, 2020 (age 6); Louisville, Kentucky, U.S.
- Occupation: Emotional support animal
- Years active: 2021–present
- Known for: Running the New York City Marathon
- Owners: Justin Wood; Joyce Kung
- Residence: New York City
- seducktive.com/wrinkle-the-duck

Wrinkle Five Star (hatched September 9, 2020) is an American Pekin duck and emotional support animal who gained prominence on social media for participating in the New York City Marathon. Hatched in Louisville, Kentucky as the only survivor of a clutch of six eggs, Wrinkle is biologically male but was initially thought to be a female duckling. Circus jugglers Justin Wood and Joyce Kung, Wrinkle's owners, still use she/her pronouns to refer to her.

Wrinkle lives in New York City with Wood and Kung. They bought six American Pekin eggs in September 2020, intending to raise the ducks as performers in their variety show. During Wrinkle's initial training, Wood and Kung noticed she was good at running. A video of her running as a duckling was posted on TikTok on September 17, a week after she was hatched.

== Running career ==
Wrinkle participated in her first marathon in 2021. She did not run the entire 26-mile (42 km) course. She also competed in the 2022 New York Marathon, in which, by one estimate, she only completed 50 feet (15 m), which included several stops for water. Wrinkle has been known to walk 15 to 20 blocks and has completed the entire 1.4-mile (2.3 km) Bronx Halloween Parade. She recorded an official time of 18 minutes and 8 seconds for the 1-kilometer (0.62 mi) kids' course of the 2022 Long Island Marathon, earning a medal and reportedly setting the world duck record for that distance.

Ducks can develop a bacterial infection known as bumblefoot if they run on rough surfaces; to combat this, Wood and Kung built custom shoes for Wrinkle out of a soft red material.

Wrinkle also paints, in a style which has been described as similar to "Jackson Pollock but painted by webbed foot". Related to Pollock, Wrinkle is sometimes referred to as "Quackson Pollock" when painting, and she frequently showcases her art on her Instagram page.

== Buc-ee's ==
Wrinkle's owner, Justin Wood, brought the duck to Buc-ee's for a YouTube video, without knowing all animals are not allowed in the store. An employee requested them to leave the premises and keep the duck contained, but since Wood and Wrinkle did not leave the premises, they were given a lifetime ban.
