= Scotch Lass =

Scotch Lass (pigeon NPS.42.21610) was a carrier pigeon who received the Dickin Medal in June 1945 from the People's Dispensary for Sick Animals for bravery in service during the Second World War. She accompanied a British agent on a mission into The Netherlands. Immediately after she was released, in September 1944, and still in view of the agent that had released her, she hit telegraph wires. However, she carried on and delivered her message and photographs.

== See also ==
- List of individual birds
