= Apollo G. Bird =

African grey parrot

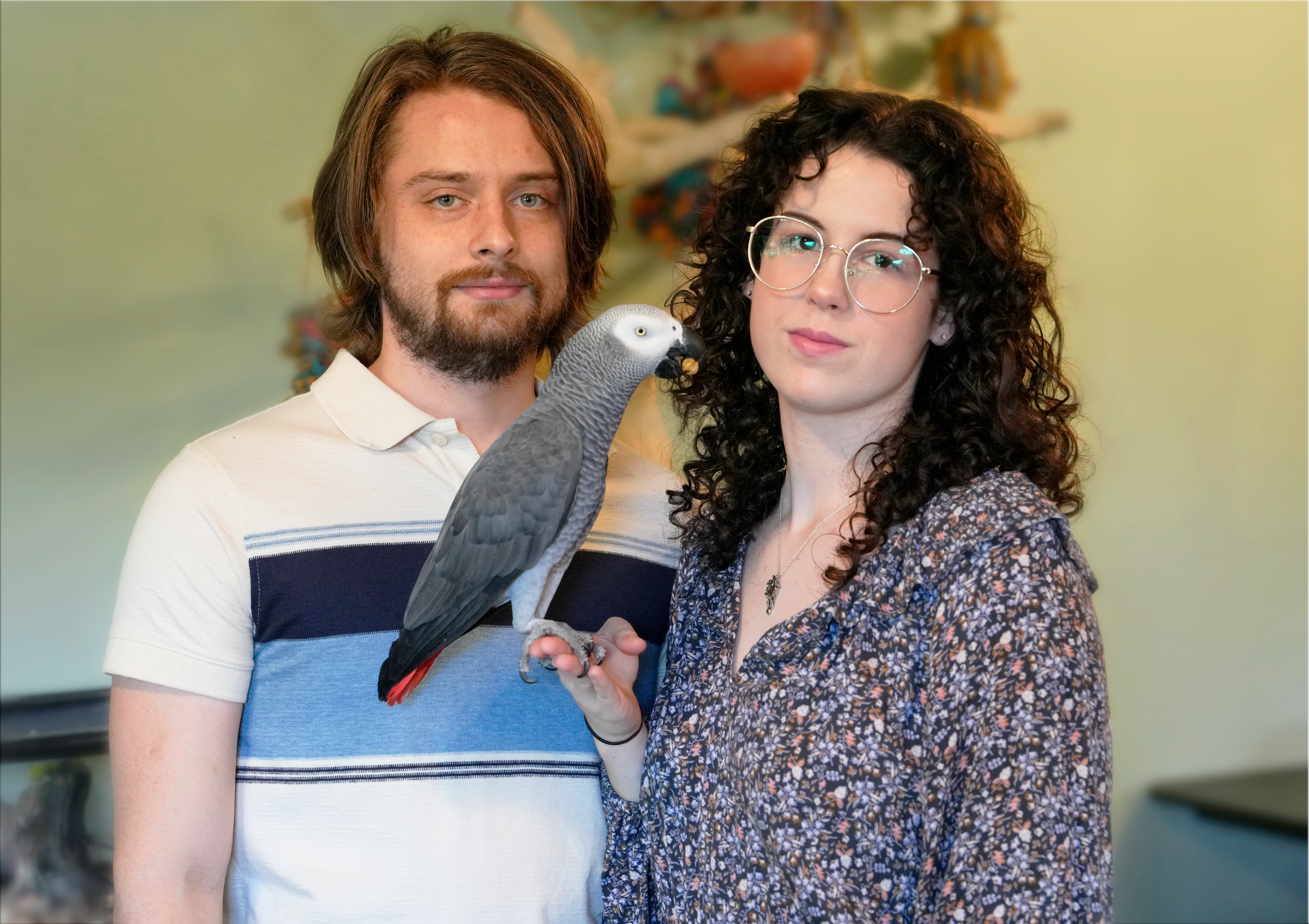
- Dalton Mason, Apollo, and Tori Mason
- Species: Grey parrot (Psittacus erithacus)
- Sex: Male
- Hatched: April 2020 (age 6)
- Known for: YouTube
- Tricks: Linguistics and object recognition
- Owners: Tori and Dalton Mason
- Awards: Guinness World Record
- Official website

Apollo G. Bird

YouTube information
- Channel: ApolloandFrens
- Years active: 2021–present
- Subscribers: 1.84 million
- Views: 1 billion
- Last updated: April 8, 2026

Apollo G. Bird (hatched April 2020) is a grey parrot and the subject of the YouTube channel "Apollo and Frens" run by couple Tori and Dalton Mason. His intelligence was equated to that of a "human toddler" and he can answer numerous complex questions in English.

== Early life ==
In December 2020, Tori (born 1998) and Dalton Mason (born 1999) purchased Apollo from Animal House Pet Center in St. Petersburg, Florida, for $1,700. He had been surrendered there by a previous owner.

They adopted him with the intent to train him based on Irene Pepperberg's model/rival technique, and document the process on their YouTube channel "Apollo and Frens". They wrote, "Through showcasing the abilities and emotional intelligence of Apollo, we plan to pursue further legal rights for all parrots, much like those of dogs and cats." They also own two white-bellied caiques that both hatched in January 2022 and are named Soleil and Ophelia. They can perform numerous complex vocalizations and tricks.

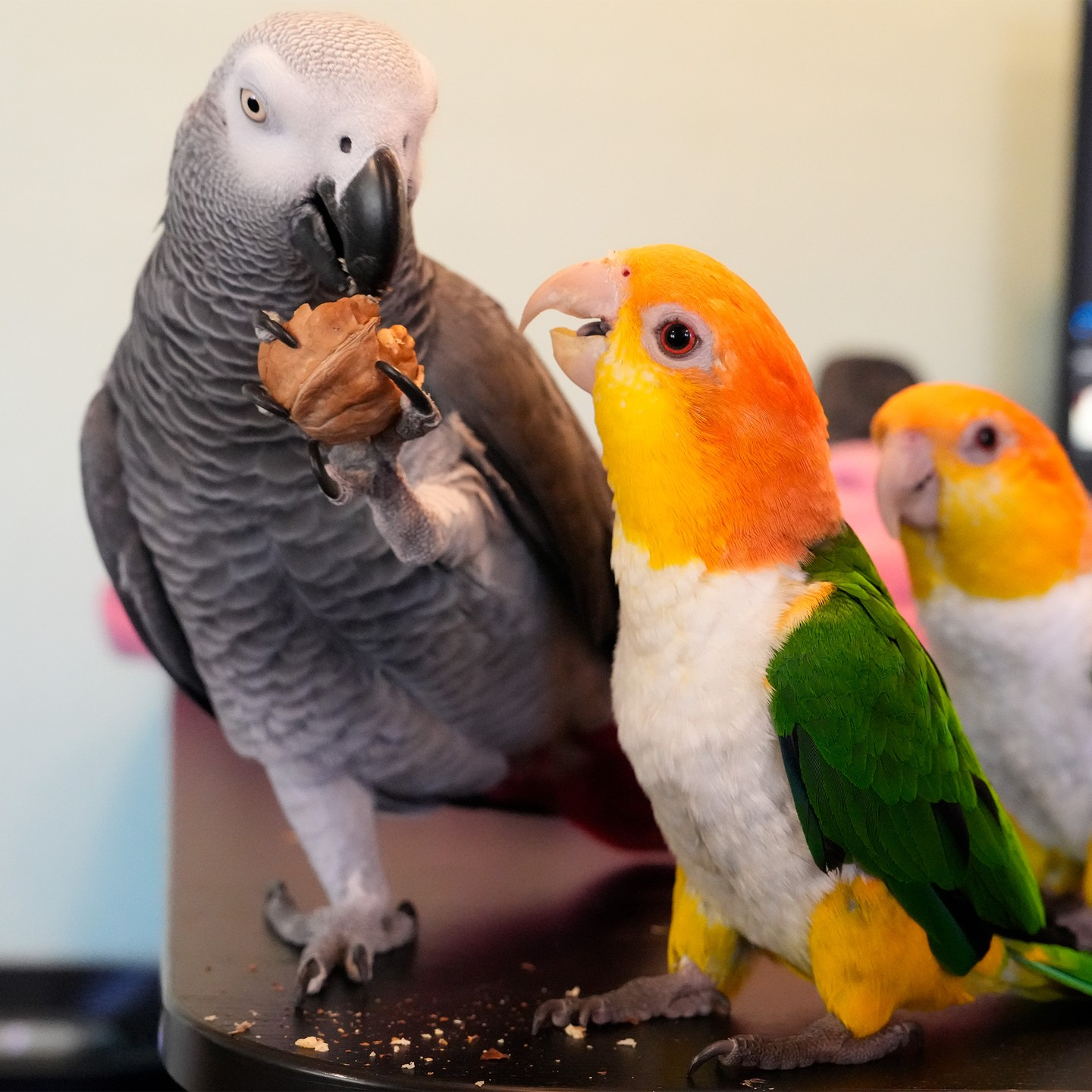
Apollo shares a walnut with his caique "sisters," Soleil and Ophelia

== Training ==
The Masons train Apollo based on Irene Pepperberg's model/rival technique she developed to train her own African grey, Alex.

In this technique, the student observes the trainer's interaction. One of the trainers models the desired student behavior and is seen by the student as a rival for the other trainer's attention. The trainer and rival exchange roles so the student can see that the process is interactive. When a student (human or parrot) answers a question about an object correctly, they receive that object as a reward, rather than a food reward, which is often used in other training techniques. Irene Pepperberg said the reward system is crucial because it is the only way that students can make a direct connection between the object and the label that they have used. Food rewards are also sparingly used. Trainers sometimes make intentional mistakes so the students can see the consequences of an incorrect identification. When the trainer makes a mistake, the trainer is scolded, and the object is removed. This technique helped Pepperberg succeed with Alex, where other scientists had failed in facilitating two-way communication with parrots. Her research environment had several obstacles to Alex's learning, such as the contradictory need for repetitive evaluation (to obtain statistically significant results) and Alex's need for novelty (to keep him engaged).

The Masons have partnered with researchers at Eckerd College, while being more interested in Apollo's personal development than publishing his results in scientific journals. They have avoided some of Pepperberg's training issues by raising him in their own home, "like a human child" and by choosing training directions based on Apollo's interests. In an interview, Tori said, "[Apollo] lets us know what he wants to learn. What he's interested in and we just progress in a path that he laid out for us."

=== Accomplishments ===
Tori and Dalton describe Apollo's general intelligence as similar to a human toddler. He can communicate in complete or nearly complete English sentences and knows the names of all the basic colors, a few materials, and many nouns. Apollo can answer questions such as "what's this?", "what color?", "what (is this) made of?", "what am I doing?" (Example: pour water, hat, book, cork, glass, plant, bug, etc) and recognizes numerous unique objects such as plastic figures of Wario and Shrek, and a Shrek themed Crocs shoe, humorously called a "shrock", named after a mispronunciation of "Shrek", wherein he earns a food reward (e.g. a pistachio, which he calls a "pistache").

On December 18, 2023, Apollo was approved for a custom Guinness World Record for "Most items identified by a parrot in three minutes," successfully identifying 12 items. The record was officially inducted into the book in August 2024.

== See also ==
- Animal language – Complex animal communication
- Batyr – Asian elephant (1970–1993)
- Chantek – Captive orangutan (1977–2017)
- Kanzi – Bonobo research subject (1980–2025)
- Koko – Captive gorilla studied by researchers
- Kosik – Elephant in South Korea (born 1990)
- List of individual birds
- N'kisi – African grey parrot
- Number sense in animals
- Talking animal – Non-human animal that can make human-like sounds
- Talking bird – Bird that can mimic human speech
- Washoe – Chimpanzee language research subject
