= Talking animal =

Non-human animal that can make human-like sounds

A talking animal or speaking animal is any non-human animal that can produce sounds or gestures resembling those of a human language. Several species or groups of animals have developed forms of communication which superficially resemble verbal language, however, these usually are not considered a language because they lack one or more of the defining characteristics, e.g. grammar, syntax, recursion, and displacement. Researchers have been successful in teaching some animals to make gestures similar to sign language, although whether this should be considered a language has been disputed.

== Possibility of animal language ==
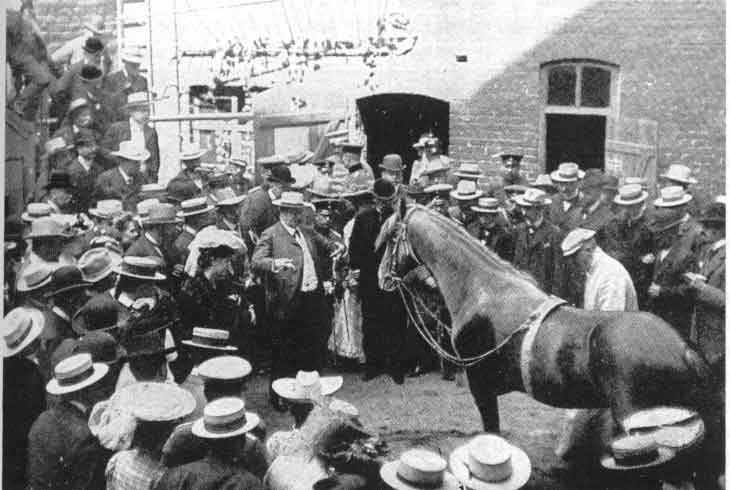
The horse Clever Hans performing

The term refers to animals who can imitate (though not necessarily understand) human speech. Parrots, for example, repeat phrases of human speech through exposure. There were parrots that learnt to use words in proper context and had meaningful dialogues with humans. Alex, a grey parrot, understood questions about color, shape, size, number of objects and would provide a one-word answer to them. He is also documented to have asked an existential question. Another grey parrot, N'kisi, could use 950 words in proper context, was able to form sentences and even understood the concept of grammatical tense.

Researchers have attempted to teach great apes (chimpanzees, gorillas and orangutans) spoken language with poor results as they can only be taught how to say one or a few basic or limited words or phrases or less, and sign language with significantly better results as they can be very creative with various signs like those of deaf people. In this regard, there are now numerous studies and an extensive bibliography.

== Reported cases by species ==
=== Birds ===
- Alex, a grey parrot researched and trained by Dr. Irene Pepperberg, demonstrated knowledge of cca. 100 words, understood the meaning of several types of questions and was documented to ask one question about himself.
- Apollo, a grey parrot trained in a home setting by Tori and Dalton Mason, and is the subject of their YouTube "Apollo and Frens". He is capable of answering questions identifying objects, colours, material, and actions, and has asked questions about new objects/materials.
- N'kisi, a grey parrot, knows over 900 words, can form sentences and even understands grammatical tense.
- Ripper, a musk duck recorded imitating human speech in 1987.

=== Dogs ===
An owner hears a dog making a sound that resembles a phrase says the phrase back to the dog, who then repeats the sound and is rewarded with a treat. Eventually the dog learns a modified version of the original sound. Dogs have limited vocal imitation skills, so these sounds usually need to be shaped by selective attention and social reward.

- A dog on America's Funniest Home Videos named Fluffy, made noises that to some viewers resembled "I want my momma" after being asked "Do you want your momma?". Other videos showed other dogs making noises which to some viewers resembling "Run around", "I want it", "I love momma" and "Hello".
- Odie, a pug who produced noises resembling "I love you" on demand, made appearances on several television shows.
- Paranormal researcher Charles Fort wrote in his book Wild Talents (1932) of several alleged cases of dogs that could speak English. Fort took the stories from contemporary newspaper accounts.
- In 1715 Gottfried Wilhelm Leibniz published an account of his encounter with a talking dog that could pronounce about 30 words.
- Don, a German pointer born around the beginning of the 20th century, was a dog that was reputed to be able to pronounce a couple of words in German and became a vaudeville sensation as a result. Although most scientists at the time dismissed Don's capabilities, the author Jan Bondeson puts forward an argument that Don was genuinely capable of limited human speech and criticises the tests that were performed on Don at the time as having serious methodological flaws.
- In 1959 a German sheepdog by the name of Corinna living in Prague spontaneously developed a capability for limited human speech. According to the zoologist Hermann Hartwigg, published under the pseudonym 'Hermann Dembeck', Corinna 'holds the record in modern times for its talking prowess'.

=== Cats ===
- The first place-winning video "Cat's Got a Tongue" from Season 10, Episode 20 of America's Funniest Home Videos features a cat speaking purported human words and phrases such as "Oh my dog", "Oh Long John", "Oh Long Johnson", "Oh Don piano", "Why I eyes ya", "All the live long day", and "Oh that long long Johnson." A longer version of the clip (which revealed the animal was reacting to the presence of another cat) was aired in the UK. Clips from this video are prevalent on YouTube. The cat became an Internet phenomenon in 2006 and appeared as a character in "Faith Hilling", the 226th episode of South Park, which aired on March 28, 2012.
- "Cat Says, 'No'," another video from the show that won first place in Season 7, Episode 10, features a cat repeatedly saying, "no".
- Miles v. City Council of Augusta, Georgia, in which the court found that the exhibition of a talking cat was considered an occupation for the purposes of municipal licensing law.

=== Great apes ===
Great apes mimicking human speech is rare although some of them have attempted to do so by often watching and mimicking the gestures, and voices from their human trainers. Apparently, human voice control in non-human great apes could derive from an evolutionary ancestor with similar voice control capacities. These include chimpanzees and orangutans.

- Johnny (1944–2007), was a chimpanzee that could also clearly say the word "mama".
- In 1962, Bioparco di Roma, a chimpanzee named Renata could clearly say the word "mama" when praised by her trainer.
- Kokomo Jr., was a chimpanzee and mascot of the Today show, who was known to say the word "mama".
- Viki was a chimpanzee that could voice four words:
  - mama
  - papa
  - up
  - cup
- Tilda (born 1965, Borneo), is an orangutan who responds to her keepers in a human-like manner e.g. pointing to the food and repeating the word "Cologne Zoo" by controlling her lips and tongue, as well as manipulating her vocal chords. To do this, she clicks her tongue to produce various tones of her voice, and grumbles in a way that is comparable to humans making vowel sounds. She only does this during feeding time when she wants to attract her keepers' attention. This was mainly due to her former time being taught by a human trainer while she was in the entertainment business.
- Rocky (born September 25, 2004), resident of the Indianapolis Zoo, is an orangutan that can say the word "hi". He was the very first ape to produce sounds similar to words in a "conversational context". These sounds have been recorded in use and can be seen here. In the video, Rocky is participating in a training session wherein he is being asked to produce vocals outside of the typical orangutan "vocabulary." The Indianapolis Zoo made a public statement about Rocky's vocalizations and their implications for current and future studies.

=== Elephants ===
- Batyr (elephant) (1969–1993), an elephant from Kazakhstan, was reported to have a vocabulary of more than 20 phrases. Recordings of Batyr saying "Batyr is good", "Batyr is hungry", and words such as "drink" and "give" were played on Kazakh state radio in 1980.
- Kosik (born 1990) is an elephant able to imitate Korean words.

=== Cetaceans ===
Some of the species of toothed whales like dolphins and porpoises such as beluga whales and orca can imitate the patterns of human speech.

- NOC, a captive beluga whale in the United States Navy's Cold Ops program, could mimic some words well enough to confuse Navy divers on at least one occasion.
- John C. Lilly's assistant Margaret Howe trained a dolphin named Peter to produce several words, including a credible "Mar-ga-ret".
- Wikie is an orca that can say "hello", "goodbye", and "Amy" (her trainer).

=== Others ===
- Hoover was a harbor seal who repeated common phrases heard around his exhibit at the New England Aquarium, including his name. He appeared in publications like Reader's Digest and The New Yorker, and television programs like Good Morning America.
- Nellie the sea otter at the Point Defiance Zoo would sometimes "talk back" to her caretakers with atypical vocalizations that resembled garbled human speech.
- Gef the talking mongoose was an alleged talking animal who inhabited a small house on the Isle of Man, off the coast of Great Britain. Fringe authors believe Gef was a poltergeist, a strange animal or cryptid. Contemporary academics believe it was most likely a hoax.
- It is not unusual for goats to make noises that sound like syllables from human words. Some videos of this behavior have ended up becoming popular on YouTube. An example from Tennessee of a baby goat seeming to say "what what what?" got over seven million views.

== In fiction ==
There are many examples throughout history in fiction, be it in written form or in film and animation. In the Pokémon franchise, Meowth of Team Rocket is considered a unique Pokémon in that he can understand and use human language, even serving as a translator for his fellow Pokémon, where they can only usually call out their own names verbally.

== See also ==
- Animal cognition
- Animal communication
- Animal language
- Biosemiotics
- Derek Bickerton – Animal Communication Systems researcher
- Human–animal communication
- Human speechome project
- Kinship with All Life
- Vocal learning
