= Poll (parrot) =

Grey parrot owned by Rachel and Andrew Jackson

Poll, nicknamed Polly, was a pet grey parrot (Psittacus erithacus) originally owned by Rachel Jackson but adopted after her death by her husband, U.S. president Andrew Jackson. According to an unauthenticated anecdote, Poll had to be removed from Jackson's funeral in 1845 after causing a disturbance by shouting profanities.

== Life ==
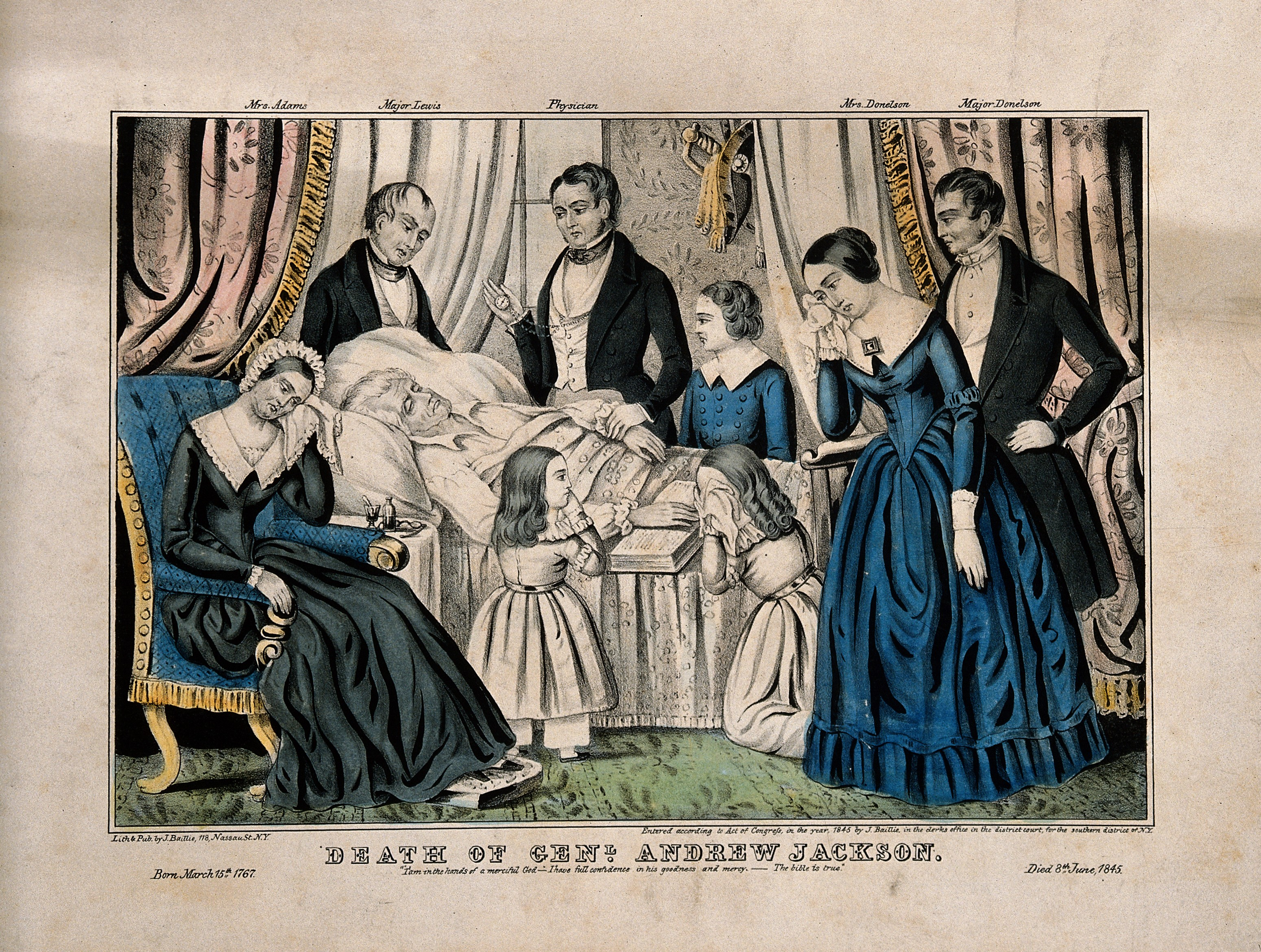
The death of Andrew Jackson

Poll, nicknamed Polly, was purchased by Andrew Jackson for his wife Rachel for $25 in 1827 (equivalent to $711 in 2025), a year before her death. Jackson loved Poll dearly, and often wrote letters to his nephew, William Donelson, asking about the bird's health; Donelson took care of Poll while Jackson could not. In his letters, Donelson described Poll as "fat and saucy" and predicted that she would "live to be an old Bird". Poll appeared less frequently in Jackson's letters after 1837, due in part to Jackson living with the bird at that point.

At Jackson's funeral on June 10, 1845, Poll is said to have repeatedly cursed loudly, disturbing the attendees of the funeral. Reverend William Menefee Norment, who was there, recollected that Poll "got excited and commenced swearing so loud and long as to disturb the people and had to be carried from the house"[emphasis in original]. Professor of History Dan Feller at the University of Tennessee said that the story is "uncontroverted but also unauthenticated". Norment (born September 1829) was 15 years old when the funeral took place, and first wrote about it in 1921 when he was 91 years old, or nearly 76 years after the supposed incident. It is the only known eyewitness account, and partly accredited to Norment's daughter Fannie who wrote it in a letter on his behalf.

After Jackson's death, Poll was likely cared for by Jackson's remaining family at the Hermitage. The last known reference to Poll was in an 1850 letter written by Jackson's adoptive grandchildren.

== See also ==
- Talking bird – Bird that can mimic human speech
- United States presidential pets
- List of individual birds
