= Temne =

Temne can refer to:

- Temne people, an ethnic group of Sierra Leone
- Kingdom of Koya or Temne Kingdom, 1505-1896 state in the north of present-day Sierra Leone
- Temne language, spoken by the Temne people

== See also ==
- Timneh parrot, a parrot from Sierra Leone
