= Alex (parrot) =

Parrot used for experiments (1976–2007)

- Alex participating in a numerical cognition experiment
- Species: Grey parrot (Psittacus erithacus)
- Sex: Male
- Hatched: May 18, 1976; United Kingdom
- Died: September 6, 2007 (aged 31); Brandeis University, Waltham, Massachusetts, United States
- Known for: Intelligent use of language
- Owner: Irene Pepperberg

Alex (May 18, 1976 – September 6, 2007) was a grey parrot and the subject of a thirty-year experiment by animal psychologist Irene Pepperberg, initially at Purdue University, then the University of Arizona and later at Harvard University and Brandeis University. When Alex was about one year old, Pepperberg bought him at a pet shop. In her book Alex & Me, Pepperberg describes her unique relationship with Alex and how Alex helped her understand animal minds. "Alex" was an acronym for avian language experiment, or avian learning experiment.

Before Pepperberg's work with Alex, it was widely believed in the scientific community that a large primate brain was needed to handle complex problems related to language and understanding; birds were not considered to be intelligent, as their only common use of communication was mimicking and repeating sounds to interact with each other. However, Alex's accomplishments supported the idea that birds may be able to reason on a basic level and use words creatively. Pepperberg wrote that Alex's intelligence was on a level similar to dolphins and great apes. She also reported that Alex seemed to show the intelligence of a five-year-old human in some respects, and had not reached his full potential by the time he died. She believed that he possessed the emotional level of a two-year-old human at the time of his death.

== Early life ==
Animal psychologist Irene Pepperberg bought Alex at a pet store after finishing her PhD in theoretical chemistry, with the intent of studying his cognitive and communicative abilities. She believes that Alex may have had his wings clipped when he was young, which could have prevented him from learning to fly.

== Training ==
Alex's training used a model/rival technique, in which he observes trainers interacting. One of the trainers models the desired student behavior, and is seen by the student as a rival for the other trainer's attention. The trainer and rival exchange roles so the student can see that the process is interactive. When a student (human or parrot) answers a question about an object correctly, they receive that object as a reward instead of a food reward, which is often used in other training techniques. Irene Pepperberg said the reward system is crucial, because it is the only way that students can make the direct connection between the object and the label that they have used. Food rewards are also sparingly used. Trainers sometimes make intentional mistakes so the students can see the consequences of an incorrect identification. Upon making a mistake, the trainer is scolded and the object is removed.

This technique helped Pepperberg succeed with Alex where other scientists had failed in facilitating two-way communication with parrots. In later years, Alex sometimes assumed the role of one of Pepperberg's assistants by acting as the "model" and "rival" in helping to teach a fellow parrot in the lab, as well as correcting their mistakes. Alex sometimes practiced words when he was alone.

== Accomplishments ==
Pepperberg did not claim that Alex could use "language", instead saying that he used a two-way communications code. Listing Alex's accomplishments in 1999, Pepperberg said he could identify 50 different objects and recognize quantities up to six; that he could distinguish seven colors and five shapes, and understand the concepts of "bigger", "smaller", "same", and "different", and that he was learning "over" and "under". Alex passed increasingly difficult tests measuring whether humans have achieved Piaget's Substage 6 object permanence. Alex showed surprise and anger when confronted with a nonexistent object or one different from what he had been led to believe was hidden during the tests.

Alex had a vocabulary of over 100 words, but was exceptional in that he appeared to have understanding of what he said. For example, when Alex was shown an object and asked about its shape, color, or material, he could label it correctly. He could describe a key as a key no matter what its size or color, and could determine how the key was different from others. Looking at a mirror, he said "What color?" and learned the word "grey" after being told "grey" six times. This made him the first non-human animal to have ever asked a question, let alone an existential one (apes who have been trained to use sign language have so far failed to ever ask a single question).

Alex was said to have understood the turn-taking of communication and sometimes the syntax used in language. He named an apple a "banerry" (pronounced as rhyming with some pronunciations of "canary"), which a linguist friend of Pepperberg's thought to be a combination of "banana" and "cherry", two fruits he was more familiar with.

Alex could add, to a limited extent, correctly giving the number of similar objects on a tray. Pepperberg said that if he could not count, the data could be interpreted as indicating that he could estimate quickly and accurately the number of something, better than humans can. When he was tired of being tested, he would say "Wanna go back", meaning he wanted to go back to his cage, and in general, he would request where he wanted to be taken by saying "Wanna go ...", protest if he was taken to a different place, and sit quietly when taken to his preferred spot. He was not trained to say where he wanted to go, but picked it up from being asked where he would like to be taken.

If the researcher displayed irritation, Alex tried to defuse it with the phrase, "I'm sorry." If he said "Wanna banana", but was offered a nut instead, he stared in silence, asked for the banana again, or took the nut and threw it at the researcher or otherwise displayed annoyance, before requesting the item again. When asked questions in the context of research testing, he gave the correct answer approximately 80% of the time.

Once, Alex was given several different colored blocks (two red, three blue, and four green, similar to the picture above). Pepperberg asked him, "What color three?" expecting him to say blue. However, as Alex had been asked this question before, he seemed to have become bored. He answered "Five!" This kept occurring until Pepperberg said "Fine, what color five?" Alex replied "None". This was said to suggest that parrots, like humans, get bored. Sometimes, Alex answered the questions incorrectly, despite knowing the correct answer.

Preliminary research also seems to indicate that Alex could carry over the concept of four blue balls of wool on a tray to four notes from a piano. Pepperberg was also training him to recognize the symbol "4" as "four." Alex also showed some comprehension of personal pronouns; he used different language when referring to himself or others, indicating a concept of "I" and "you."

In July 2005, Pepperberg reported that Alex understood the concept of zero. If asked the difference between two objects, he also answered that; but if there was no difference between the objects, he said "None," which meant that he understood the concept of nothing or zero. In July 2006, Pepperberg discovered that Alex's perception of optical illusions was similar to human perception.

Pepperberg was training Alex to recognize English graphemes, in the hope that he would conceptually relate an English written word with the spoken word. He could identify sounds made by two-letter combinations such as SH and OR.

== Death ==
Alex was found dead in his cage on September 6, 2007, at age 31, appearing to have died sometime overnight. His death came as a surprise, as the average life-span for a grey parrot in captivity is 45 years. His last words were "You be good. I love you. See you tomorrow." which he would say every night when Pepperberg left the laboratory. Alex's necropsy revealed no discernible cause of death, though it was later stated to be "either a fatal arrhythmia, heart attack or stroke" associated with arteriosclerosis.

== Criticisms ==
Some academics have expressed skepticism of Pepperberg's findings and suggested that Alex's communications is operant conditioning. Nim Chimpsky, a chimpanzee, was thought to be using language, but there is some debate over whether he simply imitated his teacher. Herbert Terrace, who worked with Nim Chimpsky, says he thinks Alex performed by rote rather than by using language; he claims Alex's responses are "a complex discriminating performance", adding that he believes that in every situation, "there is an external stimulus that guides his response."

== See also ==
- Animal language – Complex animal communication
- Apollo (parrot) – African grey parrot
- Batyr (elephant) – Asian elephant (1970–1993)
- Chantek – Captive orangutan (1977–2017)
- Kanzi – Bonobo research subject (1980–2025)
- Koko (gorilla) – Captive gorilla studied by researchers
- Kosik (elephant) – Elephant in South Korea (born 1990)
- List of individual birds
- N'kisi – African grey parrot
- Number sense in animals
- Talking animal – Non-human animal that can make human-like sounds
- Talking bird – Bird that can mimic human speech
- Washoe (chimpanzee) – Chimpanzee language research subject
