= Talking bird =

Bird that can mimic human speech

Video of a caged orange-winged amazon saying "Hello" having been prompted by visitors at the Cadbury Garden Centre, North Somerset, England

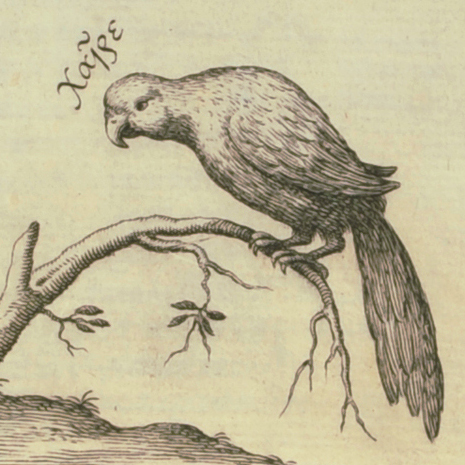
Parrot in Musurgia Universalis (1650) saying Χαῖρε ("hello" in Ancient Greek)

Talking birds are birds that can mimic the speech of humans. There is debate within the scientific community over whether some talking parrots also have some cognitive understanding of the language. Birds have varying degrees of talking ability: some, like the corvids, are able to mimic only a few words and phrases, while some budgerigars have been observed to have a vocabulary of almost 2,000 words. The common hill myna, a common pet, is well known for its talking ability and its relative, the common starling, is also adept at mimicry. Wild cockatoos in Australia have been reported to have learned human speech by cultural transmission from ex-captive birds that have integrated into the flock.

The earliest reference to a talking bird comes from Ctesias in the 5th century BC. The bird, which he called Bittacus, may have been a plum-headed parakeet.

== Process ==
The young of some birds learn to communicate vocally by social learning, imitating their parents, as well as the dominant birds of their flock. Lacking vocal cords, birds are thought to make tones and sounds using throat muscles and membranes – the syrinx in particular. There are likely to be limitations on the sounds that birds can mimic due to differences in anatomical structures, such as their lacking lips.

It has been suggested that mimicry amongst birds is almost ubiquitous and it is likely that eventually, all species will be shown to be able to have some ability to mimic extra-specific sounds (but not necessarily human speech). Mimicking human speech is not limited to captive birds. Wild Australian magpies, lyrebirds and bowerbirds that interact with humans but remain free can still mimic human speech.

Songbirds and parrots are the two groups of birds able to learn and mimic human speech. Both belong to the clade Psittacopasseres. If then introduced to wild birds, the wild birds may also mimic the new sounds. This phenomenon has been observed in public parks in Sydney, Australia, where wild parrots utter phrases such as "Hello darling!" and "What's happening?"

== Types ==
=== Waterfowl (order Anseriformes) ===
==== Ducks, geese, swans (family Anatidae) ====
A musk duck (Biziura lobata) named Ripper was recorded imitating human speech in 1987. No other waterfowl have been documented imitating speech.

=== Parrots (order Psittaciformes) ===
==== Cockatoos (family Cacatuidae) ====
Galahs (Eolophus roseicapilla) can talk, although not as well as some other parrots. Male galahs are reportedly easier to teach than females.

The long-billed corella (Cacatua tenuirostris) is described as being able to talk "very clearly".

The sulphur-crested cockatoo (Cacatua sulphurea) is rated as a fair-to-good talker.

==== African and New World parrots (family Psittacidae) ====
The African grey parrots (Psittacus) are particularly noted for their advanced cognitive abilities and their ability to talk. There are two commonly kept species of which the Timneh parrot (Psittacus timneh) tends to learn to speak at a younger age than the Congo parrot (Psittacus erithacus). Pet Congo greys may learn to speak within their first year, but many do not say their first word until 12–18 months old. Timnehs are generally observed to start speaking earlier, some in their late first year.

The monk parakeet (Myiopsitta monachus), sometimes known as the quaker parakeet, is also a skilled talker.

Many species of the genus Amazona are talkers, including the yellow-headed parrot (Amazona oratrix), yellow-crowned parrot (Amazona ochrocephala), yellow-naped parrot (Amazona auropalliata), blue-fronted parrot (Amazona aestiva), white-fronted parrot (Amazona albifrons), lilac-crowned amazon (Amazona finschi), orange-winged parrot (Amazona amazonica), Panama amazon (Amazona ochrocephala panamensis) and mealy parrot (Amazona farinosa). They tend to relate sounds to relationships more than grey parrots, thereby outperforming grey parrots in more social environments.

Macaws can also be considered to be good talkers.

==== Old World parrots (family Psittaculidae) ====
The Australian king parrot (Alisterus scapularis) can be trained to talk if it is hand-reared.

The eclectus parrot (Eclectus) is a strong talker, although these abilities depend entirely on training from an early age.

The slaty-headed parakeet (Psittacula himalayana) generally does not learn to talk.

The blossom-headed parakeet (Psittacula roseata) is rare and therefore not often kept as a pet, however, they are good talkers.

The Derbyan parakeet (Psittacula derbianais) is an excellent talker. The clarity of their speech has been compared to that of amazon parrots although they may not learn extensive vocabularies.

The African rose-ringed parakeet (Psittacula krameri krameri), a subspecies of the rose-ringed parakeet, is also capable of can talking, but may require training at an early age to do. The Indian rose-ringed parakeet (Psittacula krameri manillensis), another subspecies of the rose-ringed parakeet, is an well-known talker and popular pet which can develop a large vocabulary and talk in sentences.

The budgerigar, or common parakeet (Melopsittacus undulatus), is a popular talking-bird species because of their potential for large vocabularies, ease of care and well-socialized demeanor. Between 1954 and 1962, a budgerigar named Sparkie Williams held the record for having the largest vocabulary of a talking bird; at his death, he knew 531 words and 383 sentences. In 1995, a budgerigar named Puck was credited by Guinness World Records as having the largest vocabulary of any bird, at 1,728 words.

The black-winged lovebird (Agapornis taranta) can talk if trained at an early age; however, they only rarely develop into competent talkers.

=== Passerines (order Passeriformes) ===
==== Lyrebirds (family Menuridae) ====
In Australia, lyrebirds are great mimics of many sounds, including the human voice. Lyrebirds have three syringeal muscles whereas most other songbirds have four. This could make the syrinx of the lyrebird more flexible. In a study comparing the sonograms of lyrebirds and Australian magpies during mimicking, the author stated that the mimicry of the lyrebird was "impressionistic" while that of the magpie was "realistic".

==== Honeyeaters (family Meliphagidae) ====
The tui is a bird of New Zealand that has been known to mimic human speech.

==== Woodswallows, butcherbirds and allies (family Artamidae) ====
One hand-raised Australian magpie (Gymnorhina tibicen) developed the ability to mimic human speech, including words and phrases. This individual mimicked a large number of (non-human) sounds, but a third of all mimicked sounds were of human speech. The author stated that mimicry by the magpie was far more accurate than that of the lyrebird.

==== Crows, jays (family Corvidae) ====
Several members of the corvids or crow family, such as ravens, can mimic human speech. The best talking crows may be the ones found in captivity at zoos and wildlife centers.

==== Mockingbirds, thrashers (family Mimidae) ====
The northern mockingbird (Mimus polyglottos), as both the common and taxonomic names suggest, are mimickers of a great number of sounds. This includes human speech.

==== Starlings, rhabdornises (family Sturnidae) ====
The Common hill myna (Gracula religiosa) is renowned for its ability to mimic the human voice. It has been claimed that the Common hill myna is one of the best mimics in the world.

The common starling (Sturnus vulgaris) is an exceptional mimic specifically of human speech. In some cases it can mimic human speech well enough to create confusion.

==== Finches, euphonias (family Fringillidae) ====
A domestic canary (Serinus canaria forma domestica) named Pinchi, who lived in 1966 from 2–3 months of age with a resident of the city of Leningrad, learned to imitate the human speech of his owner-educator and weave it into his song. The bird began to repeat the tunes of its mistress's high voice "Pinchi, Briks – cute birds, weird little birds, these are these birds" after 4 months and in year and a half canary Pinchi completely formed his song from the words of human speech and the trills of birds. The singing of canary Pinchi, containing the words of human speech, was recorded on a tape recorder, and then published on a gramophone record in the record company Melodiya. In 1976, copies of this record were attached to the book by A. S. Malchevsky and co-authors "Birds in front of a microphone and a camera", and were also sold separately.

== Function ==
Several theories have been proposed regarding the function of audible mimicry in general; however, these do not make a specific theory regarding why human speech is mimicked. Several of the theories will apply to only some species due to social structure, habitat and behavioural ecology.

=== Mistaken copying ===
It has been suggested that (general) mimicry of non-bird related sounds is simply a mistaken attempt to copy species-specific calls.

=== Flock recognition ===
In the wild, flocks of parrots develop distinct local dialects. Research indicates they use these to distinguish familiar members of their flock from unfamiliar birds of other flocks. Birds respond more to vocalisations that are familiar to their own, and they ostracize individuals that vocalise in a different way. Birds raised in captivity might mimic humans, particularly their owners, to gain acceptance as a member of the family (flock). If they hear a word or phrase repeatedly, they might interpret that as a vocalisation distinct to their flock. They then attempt to make the vocalisation themselves to maintain their membership of that flock. If the parrot gets no response when it squawks a natural parrot vocalisation, but receives attention or food when it mimics human speech, it has an extra incentive to repeat human words and phrases.

=== Territoriality ===
The territorial song of lyrebirds is relatively simple and substantially different from that of the sounds they mimic—including human speech.

=== Sexual selection for large repertoire ===
One proposed function for (general) mimicry is that mimics have evolved to have a wide repertoire of vocalisations to increase their reproductive success. The male lyrebird, for example, adorns his song with many different mimicked sounds, often the songs of other nearby birds, but can include car horns, chainsaws and barking dogs.

=== Anti-predation ===
General mimicry may help a bird prevent itself or its offspring from being preyed upon. For example, the Australian magpie mimics the call of the barking owl and the boobook owl, both predators of the magpie's young.

=== Auditory map ===
Some birds, such as the Australian magpie, mimic only those noises it hears whilst in its territory. It has been suggested that birds with complex social organisation may develop an auditory map of their territory, as well as visual, and that mimicking facilitates this process.

== Cognition controversy ==
There is controversy about whether parrots are capable of using language, or merely mimic what they hear. However, some scientific studies—for example those conducted over a 30-year period by Irene Pepperberg with a grey parrot named Alex and other parrots, covered in stories on network television on numerous occasions—have suggested that these parrots are capable of using words meaningfully in linguistic tasks.

Some in the scientific community are skeptical of Pepperberg's findings, pointing to Alex's communications as operant conditioning. Critics point to the case of Clever Hans, a horse whose owner claimed could count, but who instead was actually understanding subtle cues from him. In another case, Nim Chimpsky, a chimpanzee, was thought to be using language, but there is some debate over whether he simply imitated his teacher. Dr. Herbert Terrace, who worked with Nim Chimpsky, says he thinks Alex performed by rote rather than using language; he calls Alex's responses "a complex discriminating performance", adding that in every situation, "there is an external stimulus that guides his response." Supporters of Alex mention that Alex was able to talk to and perform for anyone involved in the project as well as complete strangers who recorded findings unassisted and during first contact with the bird.

Scientists in France and the Czech Republic have also had some success in teaching grey parrots to label items referentially using human language, albeit using a different teaching methodology to that of Pepperberg—which was found to be ineffective in the case of the particular birds within the study.

== Famous talking birds ==
Alex, a grey parrot, had a vocabulary of about 100 words, substantially fewer than world record holders, but he is perhaps the best known talking bird due to the publicity surrounding his potential cognitive abilities. Alex was the first ever recorded animal to have asked a question, asking "What color?" upon looking in the mirror, and learning both the answer and the word "Gray". Alex died on September 6, 2007.

Apollo, a grey parrot, who is currently being raised by Tori and Dalton Mason in a home setting. His training model is based on the model used for Alex the grey parrot, with some changes such as the home setting and a lack of strict focus on specific subjects, instead being trained based on his interests. He can answer various complex questions, often answering several for a pistachio reward. He is capable of identifying many objects, the material from which those objects are made, what color they are, and various actions such as "hat" (placing an object on one's head), and "pour water". He is the second ever recorded animal and grey parrot to have asked a question, after Alex the grey parrot. He holds a custom Guinness World Record for "Most items identified by a parrot in three minutes," at 12 items.

"Poll" was a parrot owned by United States President Andrew Jackson. Poll was reportedly taught to say profanities by Jackson, and was said to have been removed from his funeral due to persistent cursing.

"Prudle" held the Guinness World Record for many years as the bird with the largest vocabulary - a documented 800 words.

"N'kisi", another grey parrot, is noted for his impressive English usage skills and other abilities. As of January 2004, he had a documented vocabulary of 950 words. N'kisi is believed to be one of the most advanced users of human language in the animal world.

"Einstein" appeared on many television shows and became famous for her ability to recreate sounds as well as talking. Video clips show her making the sound of a laser beam generator and an evil-sounding laugh. She had been trained by Stephanie White.

Grip was a raven kept as a pet by Charles Dickens. She knew several phrases, including "halloa, old girl", and was the basis for an integral character in Dickens's novel Barnaby Rudge. On more than one occasion, Grip's untimely utterances affect the course of the narrative. Grip was the inspiration for Edgar Allan Poe's poem The Raven.

In the USSR, the budgerigar Keshka was famous as a talking parrot who knew 120 words and could pronounce the full postal address of his owner (in case he flew away or got lost). Budgerigars were the most common among all parrots and other talking bird species in the USSR, kept as pets in homes and in some schools (by groups of young naturalists).

== In fiction ==
Talking birds are used as a plot element in fiction, notably in many works by Gabriel García Márquez.

A parrot who recites numbers is integral to the plot of The Final Solution by Michael Chabon.

- In The Mystery of the Stuttering Parrot by Robert Arthur Jr., the young protagonists look for a group of talking birds, each of whom gives a cryptic clue to the location of a valuable treasure.

=== Parrots (order Psittaciformes) ===
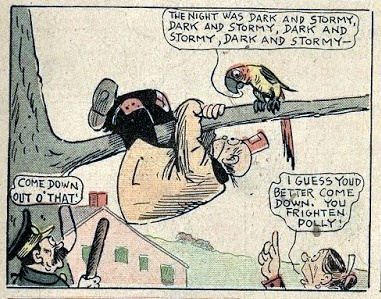
Happy Hooligan attempting to rescue a talking parrot in a 1909 comic strip

- In Hugh Lofting's The Story of Doctor Dolittle, the first title in his Doctor Dolittle series of children's books, would-be veterinarian John Dolittle is taught animal languages by Polynesia, a 200-year-old West African parrot. In the 1967 film, Polynesia is portrayed as a macaw who, "...speak[s] over two thousand languages, including Dodo and Unicorn. I had a classical education."
- They are used to humorous effect in the Tintin books The Broken Ear, Red Rackham's Treasure and The Castafiore Emerald by Hergé.
- "Captain Flint", named for a notorious deceased pirate captain, is Long John Silver's talking parrot in Robert Louis Stevenson's novel Treasure Island (1883). Her habitual refrain: "Pieces of eight! Pieces of eight!"
- Two LucasArts Adventure Games—Indiana Jones and the Fate of Atlantis and Monkey Island 2: LeChuck's Revenge—feature talking parrots as a crucial means to solve certain puzzles. In the former, a parrot reveals the title of Plato's Lost Dialogue; In the latter, a parrot dispenses instructions on how to reach a fabled treasure.
- In Phoenix Wright: Ace Attorney, a parrot was cross-examined in a courtroom due to being trained to recall and speak details of a murder trial. In a subsequent game in the franchise (Professor Layton v. Phoenix Wright, to be specific), another parrot was cross-examined for the same reason.
- In the Pirates of the Caribbean film series, Cotton, a mute pirate of the Black Pearl crew, carries a macaw that speaks for him.
- In Super Mario Odyssey, a parrot named Talkatoo will give hints to the player about the location of power moons.

==== African and New World parrots (family Psittacidae) ====
- In Puck of Pook's Hill by Rudyard Kipling, a grey parrot lives aboard Witta's ship. "When first we entered there a loud voice cried, 'Out swords! Out swords! Kill, kill!' Seeing us start Witta laughed, and showed us it was but a great-beaked grey bird with a red tail. He sat her on his shoulder, and she called for bread and wine hoarsely, and prayed him to kiss her.'
- Mercedes Lackey has at least 2 novels with significant roles for a talking Grey: The Wizard of London, and Grey's Ghost.
- Harry's Mad by Dick King-Smith features an African Grey named Madison (a macaw in the TV adaptation), whose previous owner taught him to communicate, rather than just repeating phrases.

=== Passerines (order Passeriformes) ===
==== Crows, jays (family Corvidae) ====
- In the narrative poem The Raven by Edgar Allan Poe the titular bird famously recites the word "Nevermore" throughout.
- Charles Dickens' historical novel Barnaby Rudge includes the character Grip, a prominently featured talking Raven that is modeled after two of Dickens' own pet ravens.
- Talking ravens are a notable element in the series A Song of Ice and Fire by author George R. R. Martin. One old raven at Castle Black, in particular, has the ability to say "Corn!" when hungry, but say "Snow!" and "King!" as well after being adopted by the character Jon Snow.
- The 2017 Doctor Who episode The Eaters of Light depicts talking crows in Scotland at the time of the Picts' wars against the Romans. It further suggests that the cawing of crows originated from their being trained by the Picts to say the name of Kar, a female warrior killed fighting the titular monster.
- The Raven in the Discworld novels, who acts as the Death of Rats' interpreter into human speech.

==== Starlings, rhabdornises (family Sturnidae) ====
- A common hill myna provides important clues about the night of Laura Palmer's death in the television show Twin Peaks by David Lynch and Mark Frost.
- In the Perry Mason episode The Case of the Laughing Lady, a Bare-eyed myna plays a similar role.
- In the Fudge books by Judy Blume Fudge gets a myna bird he names Uncle Feather that features in some of the gags in the books. One of the gags is that Uncle Feather speaks the French language.
- In the Cheech & Chong comedy film Up In Smoke, Cheech's cousin "Strawberry" keeps a myna that Chong offers cannabis to, with the bird repeating the offer.
- In Henry IV Part I, Hotspur declares that if Henry IV of England refuses to ransom Edmund Mortimer, he will train a starling to repeat the name "Mortimer" and then give it to the king.

== See also ==
- Biosemiotics
