= Sparkie Williams =

Talking budgerigar

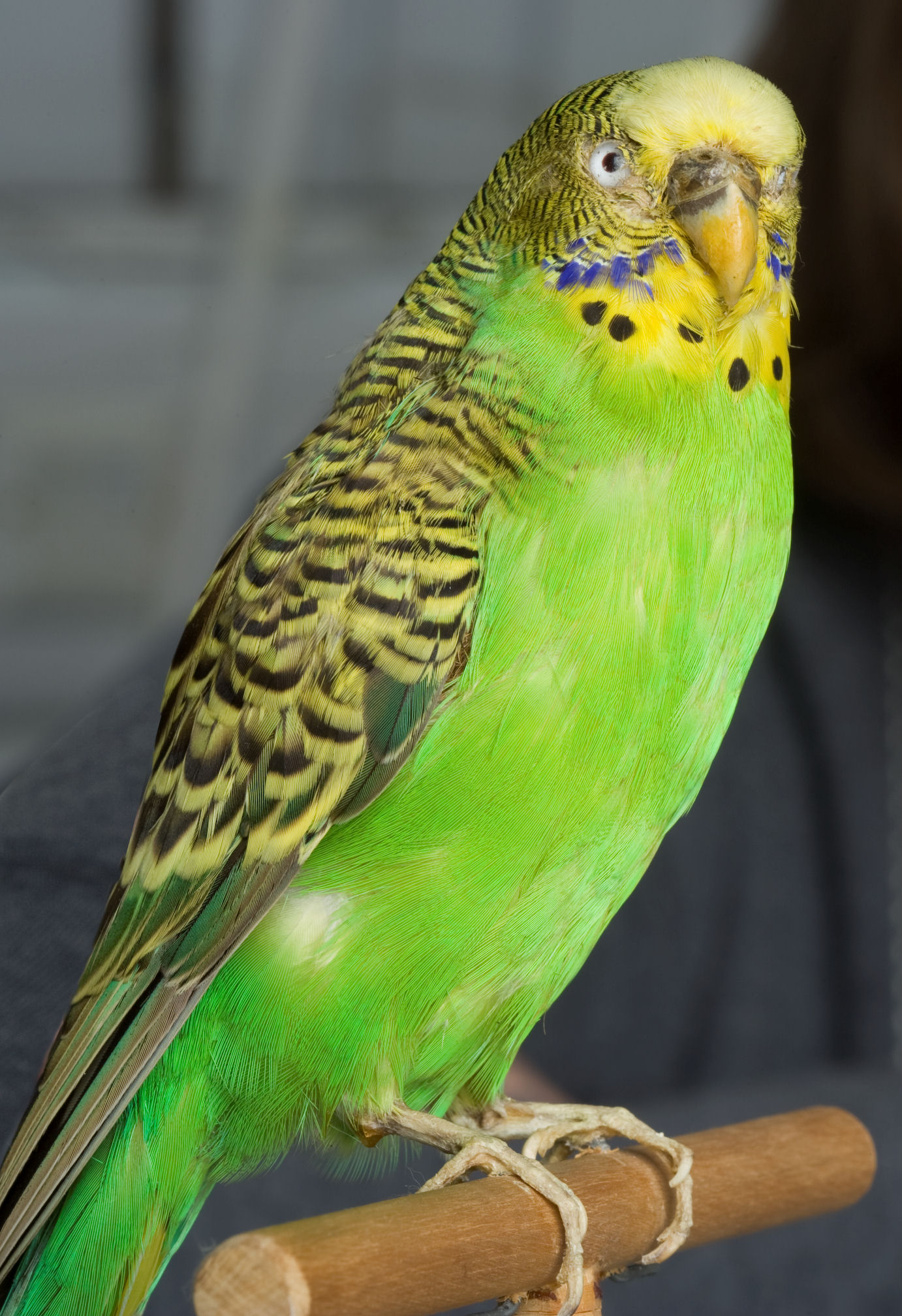
- Sparkie (now stuffed) at the Natural History Society of Northumbria
- Hatched: 1954; North East England, U.K.
- Died: 1962 (aged 7 or 8); Forest Hall, U.K.
- Occupation: Talking bird
- Known for: His repertoire of more than 500 words

Sparkie Williams (1954 – 1962) was a talking budgie who had a repertoire of more than 500 words and eight nursery rhymes, becoming a national celebrity in the United Kingdom after fronting an advertising campaign for Capern's bird seed, and making a record which sold 20,000 copies. After he died, he was stuffed and put on show at Newcastle's Hancock Museum. Sparkie provided the inspiration for an opera by Michael Nyman and Carsten Nicolai. The opera was performed in Berlin in March 2009.

== History ==
Hatched and bred in North East England, Sparkie was owned by Mrs. Mattie Williams, who lived in Forest Hall, near Newcastle upon Tyne. He earned his name after Mrs Williams called him "A bright little spark", and she taught him to speak, recite songs and sing nursery rhymes. Sparkie had a huge repertoire of words and sayings. By the time he was three-and-a-half, he had won the BBC International Cage Word Contest in July 1958. He was so good, in fact, that he was disqualified from taking part again.

Sparkie was courted by bird seed sellers and fronted the advertisement campaign for Capern's bird seed for two years. He was recorded talking with budgie expert Philip Marsden on BBC radio, and appeared on the BBC Tonight programme with Cliff Michelmore. When Sparkie died on Tuesday 4 December 1962, Mattie Williams had him stuffed and mounted on a wooden perch at the renowned taxidermy establishment, Rowland Ward Ltd. of Piccadilly, London. He was then taken on a tour of Britain in an exhibition of his life and work, before coming back to the Hancock Museum in 1996. Sparkie Williams is acclaimed as the world's most outstanding talking bird in the Guinness Book of Records.

Sparkie is among the exhibits on show in the Great North Museum: Hancock.

== Opera ==
The opera inspired by Sparkie is based on Michael Nyman's 1977 piece Pretty Talk. The original piece used material from an eponymous record made by Capern's bird food company to help customers teach their pet birds to talk. The 7-inch flexi disc played short sentences spoken by Sparkie's owner, Mrs Williams, to encourage her pet to speak followed by replies from Sparkie himself. The opera, Sparkie: Cage and Beyond, features further recordings from the "Sparkie" archives of the Natural History Society of Northumbria. A CD of Sparkie talking has already been released.

== See also ==
- Talking bird – Bird that can mimic human speech
- List of individual birds
