= Miles v. City Council of Augusta, Georgia =

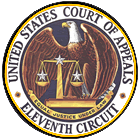
- Court: United States Court of Appeals for the Eleventh Circuit
- Full case name: Carl M. Miles, et al v. City Council of Augusta, Georgia, et al
- Decided: August 4, 1983
- Citation: 710 F.2d 1542 (11th Cir. 1983)

Case history
- Prior history: 551 F. Supp. 349 (S.D. Ga. 1982)

Court membership
- Judges sitting: Gerald Bard Tjoflat, Frank Minis Johnson, Joseph W. Hatchett

Case opinions
- Per curiam

Laws applied
- First Amendment

Miles v. City Council of Augusta, Georgia, 710 F.2d 1542 (11th Cir. 1983), is a United States federal court case in which the court found that the exhibition of a talking cat was an occupation for the purposes of municipal licensing law.

In May 1981, Carl and Elaine Miles, an otherwise unemployed couple, began exhibiting Blackie the Talking Cat on the streets of Augusta, Georgia. Blackie would meow "I love you" or "I want my Mama" to passers-by, who would give small change to the Mileses. About a month later, police warned the couple that they risked jail time if they did not obtain a $50 business license. The Mileses purchased the license but sued the city in federal court on grounds that the city's licensing law was vague and too broad and violated their right to free speech and association; specifically, the plaintiffs complained that neither the city charter, which allowed the city council to require a license for any "occupation, trade or business," nor the license ordinance mentioned talking animals.

The Mileses lost the first round of the case in district court in 1982. In his decision, the judge said:

In their brief, plaintiffs cite several definitions of the terms "occupation" and "business." The general import of these definitions is that one is engaged in an occupation or business when that work or activity occupies one's time or attention on a regular basis for profit or support. See United States v. King, 532 F.2d 505, 510 (5th Cir.1976); Southern Guaranty Insurance Company v. Duncan, 131 Ga.App. 761, 764, 206 S.E.2d 672 (1974). Inasmuch as the ordinance does not define "occupation" or "business", the common definition cited above applies. ... Plaintiffs' activity, regardless of its peculiarity, falls within this definition.

The following year, a three-judge panel of the United States Court of Appeals for the Eleventh Circuit affirmed the lower-court decision, adding the following in a footnote:

This Court will not hear a claim that Blackie's right to free speech has been infringed. First, although Blackie arguably possesses a very unusual ability, he cannot be considered a "person" and is therefore not protected by the Bill of Rights. Second, even if Blackie had such a right, we see no need for appellants to assert his right jus tertii. Blackie can clearly speak for himself.

West Publishing featured the case in its 1996 book Blackie the Talking Cat and Other Favorite Judicial Opinions.

== See also ==
- List of individual cats
- Talking animal
