= N'kisi =

African grey parrot

- Species: Grey parrot (Psittacus erithacus)
- Sex: Male
- Hatched: 1997 (age 28–29)
- Known for: Intelligent use of language
- Owner: Aimee Morgana

N'kisi is a grey parrot (Psittacus erithacus) thought to exhibit advanced English talking skills and other abilities.

== Accomplishments ==
According to news reports and websites, as of January 2004 N'kisi had a vocabulary of about 950 words and used them in context, frequently in complete sentences, had approximated verb forms to maintain the correct tense (such as saying flied when not knowing the past tense of fly), and did not depend on learned phrases to communicate his thoughts.

N'kisi was shown as being supposedly capable of understanding photographic images, naming objects (within his vocabulary) appearing in a photo and inventing new terms for things he does not know words for by combining other words, like "pretty smell medicine" for aromatherapy oils. One anecdote recounted by the primatologist Jane Goodall says that, upon meeting her in person after seeing a photo of her, N'Kisi asked, "Got a chimp?" It was claimed he demonstrated a possible sense of humor.

== Controversy ==
N'kisi took part in a published scientific study of telepathic abilities conducted by Rupert Sheldrake and the parrot's owner Aimee Morgana, after Morgana had reported seemingly telepathic reactions from the bird, such as it commenting on a movie Morgana was watching despite not being able to see the screen, or saying "hi Rob" when Morgana picked up the phone to call a friend of that name. The researchers who conducted the study claim the results present a statistically significant indication of ability, while the study has been criticized by skeptics.

== See also ==
- List of individual birds
- Apollo G. Bird
- Alex (parrot)
- Talking bird
- Batyr (elephant)
- Hoover (seal)
- Kanzi (bonobo)
- Koko (gorilla)
- Washoe (chimpanzee)
