= Bud (parrot) =

Parrot who seemed to mimic a murder victim's final argument

Bud (hatched September 1996) is an African gray parrot present when Glenna Duram murdered her husband, Martin Duram, in 2015. Following the incident, Bud began mimicking human words, including the phrase "don't fucking shoot", that the victim's family believe were the couple's final argument.

== Murder of Martin Duram ==
In May 2015, Glenna Duram shot her husband, Martin Duram, five times with a shotgun in their home in Ensley Township, Michigan. Glenna then shot herself in the head in a suicide attempt. There were signs of a struggle in the house and at first police suspected an intruder, but eventually focused on Glenna as a suspect. The couple had been experiencing financial and gambling trouble, and on the day of the murder their house was being sold in a "sheriff's sale". Glenna initially said she did not remember the shooting, saying she got her memory back while in the hospital recovering and denying the allegation. Police found three suicide notes she wrote, which she said she did not remember writing.

Glenna Duram was found guilty of first-degree murder in July 2017.

== Mimicry ==
African gray parrots are known to be good mimics of human voices and other environmental sounds. Neighbors suggested police learn what they could from Bud, the couple's parrot. According to the victim's ex-wife, who took ownership of Bud, the parrot began repeating words that sounded to be from two sides of an argument, including "No! No!", "Shut up!", "Get your ass over here now!", and "don't fucking shoot!" She believed Bud was mimicking what he heard the night of the murder. Martin's mother made the same claim, saying "that bird picks up everything and anything, and it's got the filthiest mouth around". His parents documented Bud mimicking the argument with video, which was picked up by local and national press. At the time, he was repeating it several times each week.

The prosecutor explored the possibility of using Bud's "testimony" in court. Legal experts expressed skepticism, arguing there was no good way to determine that Bud was not just mimicking something on television. Bud was not ultimately included in the trial. Another case in 1993 involved the possible use of a parrot as evidence to exonerate a defendant. In that case, the defense attorney argued the parrot should be understood as a recording device, but the judge ruled it inadmissible.
