= Karaganda Zoo =

Zoo in Kazakhstan

Қарағанды хайуанаттар бағы Karagandy Zoo
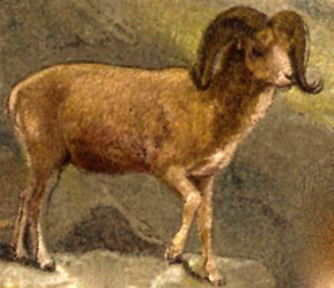
- 1st logo of the Karaganda zoo.
- Interactive map of Қарағанды хайуанаттар бағы Karagandy Zoo
- 49°47′12.21″N 73°3′36.86″E
- Date opened: 1936/1938
- Location: Karaganda, Kazakhstan
- Land area: 107.5 acres (43.5 ha)
- No. of animals: 1000+ (1990)
- No. of species: 250 (1990)

The Karaganda Zoo (also known as the Karagandy Zoo; Kazakh: Қарағанды хайуанаттар бағы, romanized: Qarağandy haiuanattar bağy; Russian: Карагандинский зоопарк, romanized: Karagandinskiy zoopark) is the state zoo of the city of Karaganda in Kazakhstan. The Karaganda Zoo covers 107.5 acres (43.5 ha), and is one of the largest and oldest zoological parks in the Republic of Kazakhstan.

The zoo is best known as the home of the "talking" elephant Batyr until his death in 1993.

== See also ==
- List of zoos
- Batyr, the zoo's talking elephant
- Almaty Zoo

== Sources ==
- R. N. Nurgaliev, ed. (1991). Казахская ССР: краткая энциклопедия [Kazakh SSR: brief encyclopedia] (in Russian). Vol. 2: Природа. Естественные ресурсы. Население. Экономика. Народное благосостояние. Alma-Ata: Kazakh Soviet Encyclopedia. p. 208. ISBN 5-89800-002-X.
