= Batyr (elephant) =

Asian elephant (1970–1993)

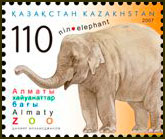
- Batyr on a postage stamp of Kazakhstan
- Species: Asian elephant
- Born: May 24, 1970; Almaty Zoo, Almaty, Kazakh SSR, Soviet Union
- Died: August 26, 1993 (aged 23); Karaganda Zoo, Kazakhstan
- Known for: Intelligent use of 20 and more phrases
- Residence: Karaganda Zoo

Batyr (May 24, 1970 – August 26, 1993) was an Asian elephant claimed to be able to use a large amount of meaningful human speech. Living in a zoo in Kazakhstan in the Soviet Union, Batyr was reported as having a vocabulary of more than 20 phrases. A recording of Batyr saying "Batyr is good", his name and using words such as drink and give was played on Kazakh state radio and on the Soviet Central Television programme Vremya in 1980.

As in all cases of talking animals, these claims are subject to the observer-expectancy effect.

== Biography ==
Born on May 24, 1970, at Almaty Zoo, Batyr lived his entire life in the Karaganda Zoo at Karaganda in Kazakhstan. He died in 1993. Batyr was the offspring of once-wild Indian elephants (a subspecies of the Asian elephant) and was the second child of his mother Palm (1959–1998) and father Dubas, (1959–1978) presented to Kazakhstan's Almaty Zoo by the Indian Prime Minister Jawaharlal Nehru. The first baby elephant (Batyr's elder brother) was killed by his mother immediately after birth on May 15, 1968.

== Abilities ==
Batyr, whose name is a Turkic word meaning 'dashing equestrian', 'man of courage' or 'athlete', was first alleged to speak just before New Year's Day in the winter of 1977 when he was seven years old. Zoo employees were the first to notice his "speech", but he soon delighted zoo-goers by appearing to ask his attendants for water and regularly praising or (infrequently) chastising himself. By 1979, his fame as the "speaking elephant" had spread in the wake of various mass-media stories about his abilities, many containing considerable fabrication and wild conjecture. Batyr's case was also included in several books on animal behaviour, and in the proceedings of several scientific conferences. These developments drew a spate of zoo visitors, and brought the offer of an exchange—Batyr for a rare bonobo—from the Czechoslovak Circus, an offer rejected by the zoo's employees.

A. N. Pogrebnoj-Aleksandroff, a young worker at the zoo who studied Batyr's abilities and wrote many publications about him, said of the elephant:

Batyr, on the level of natural blares, [Batyr] said words (including human slang) by manipulating his trunk. By putting the trunk in his mouth, pressing a tip of the trunk to the bottom of the jaw and manipulating the tongue, [the elephant] said words. Besides, being in a corner of the cage (frequently at night) with the trunk softly hanging down, the elephant said words almost silently—a sound comparable with the sound of ultrasonic devices used against mosquitoes or the peep of mosquitoes, which human hearing hears well until approximately the age of 40. While pronouncing words, only the tip of the elephant's trunk is clamped inside [the mouth] and Batyr made subtle movements with a finger-shaped shoot on the trunk tip".

Various audiovisual recordings were made during Pogrebnoj-Aleksandroff's studies of Batyr and some of these have been transferred to Russia's Moscow State University for further study.

== Death ==
Batyr died in 1993 when zookeepers accidentally gave him an overdose of sedatives. His death was reported worldwide.

== Lexicon ==
It is claimed that Batyr had a vocabulary of about 20 words in the Russian and Kazakh languages. He reportedly imitated the sounds of other animals, and uttered short phrases including words of human slang. Batyr's lexicon list was compiled from audiovisual records, scientific researches and statistical data from eyewitnesses who heard the elephant themselves. Individual and disputable sounds were not considered. All other words as reported by the media were treated as fiction, second-hand and interpretations of retellings (such as if, for example, Batyr were heard to say "water" and the media reported it as "the elephant asked to drink").

Full list of words and phrases reported to have been spoken by Batyr:
Using trunk in mouth:

- Баты́р: 'Batyr', said abruptly;
- Я: 'I'm', said very abruptly, in combination with his name, using long pronunciation; I'm-Batyr sounded almost together;
- Ба́ты́р: 'Batyr', said thoughtfully-tenderly and lingeringly;
- Батыр, Батыр, Батыр…: 'Batyr, Batyr, Batyr', joyfully running in a cage;
- Батырушка: Batyrushka, an affectionate version of the name Batyr;
- Воды́: 'water', a request;
- Хоро́ший: 'good', as in good fellow;
- Батыр хоро́ший: 'good Batyr';
- Ой-ё-ёй: 'Oy-yo-yoy', an expression of pain or regret comparable to "ouch!" or "oops!", sonorously;
- Дурак: 'fool', seldom and abruptly;
- Плохой: 'bad', rarely;
- Батыр плохой: 'bad Batyr', rarely;
- Иди́: 'go';
- Иди [на] хуй: 'go to hell', obscene Russian phrase; said for the first and only time during a telecast shooting;
- Хуй: Russian curse word for 'penis', seldom and abruptly;
- Ба́-ба: short form of babushka 'grandmother'; short children's sound ba;
- Да́: 'yes';
- Дай: 'give (me)';
- Дай-дай-дай: 'give, give, give';
- Раз-два-три: 'one, two, three', while dancing, turning and hopping.

Other sounds:

- A human-like whistle;
- Human speech allegedly uttered at infrasonic and ultrasonic frequencies;
- A gnashing sound imitative of rubber or polyfoam (foam plastic) on glass;
- The peep of rats or mice;
- The bark of dogs;
- The natural trumpeting of elephants.

== Press ==
Reporter Richard Beeston in Moscow wrote the article "Soviet Zoo Has Talking Elephant":

Batyr, a 10-year-old Indian elephant at the Karaganda Zoo in soviet Kazakhstan, can say phrases like "Batyr is good" and verbs like "drink" and "give", a Moscow newspaper reported yesterday. It's said that a recording of its voice was heard recently on Kazakh state radio. "He just pushes his trunk into his mouth and starts talking," said the deputy director of the zoo, Mr Boris Kosinsky. He told a correspondent from the Young Communist League newspaper that it all began three years ago when a startled night watchman reported that he had heard the elephant talking to itself.

— The Daily Telegraph, 9 April 1980

== Publication ==
=== Scientific ===
- Scientific conference, Agricultural Institute, Tselinograd, in Kazakhstan, 1983–1989
- The International Practical Science conference for the anniversary of Moscow Zoo, in Russia, 1984
- The International Practical Science conference for the anniversary of the Almaty Zoo, in Kazakhstan, 1987
- The International Practical Science conference in Tallinn, Estonia, 1989
- The International zoological conference; Institute of Zoology — Academy of Science, Ukraine, 1989
- The International Practical Science conference for the 125 anniversary of Leningrad Zoo, Saint Petersburg, Russia, 1990

=== In books ===
- The True History or Who is Talking? An Elephant!, Dr. A. Pogrebnoj-Alexandroff, 1979–1993. ISBN 0-9721266-0-0
- Reincarnation-Перевоплощение, Dr. A. Pogrebnoj-Alexandroff, 2001. ISBN 0-9721266-6-X
- Speaking Animals, A. Dubrov, 2001. ISBN 5-87969-086-5
- Speaking Birds and Animals, O. Silaeva, V. Ilyichev, A. Dubrov, 2005. ISBN 5-94429-016-1

=== Media ===
- Student documentary film: Who speaks? The elephant… — VGIK — Moscow (USSR)
- Audio recording of Batyr's voice by scientist and writer Dr. A. Pogrebnoj-Alexandroff (1979–1983)

== See also ==
- Alex (parrot)
- Animal language
- Koko (gorilla)
- Kosik (elephant)
- List of individual elephants
- N'kisi
- Talking animal
- Talking birds
- Washoe (chimpanzee)
