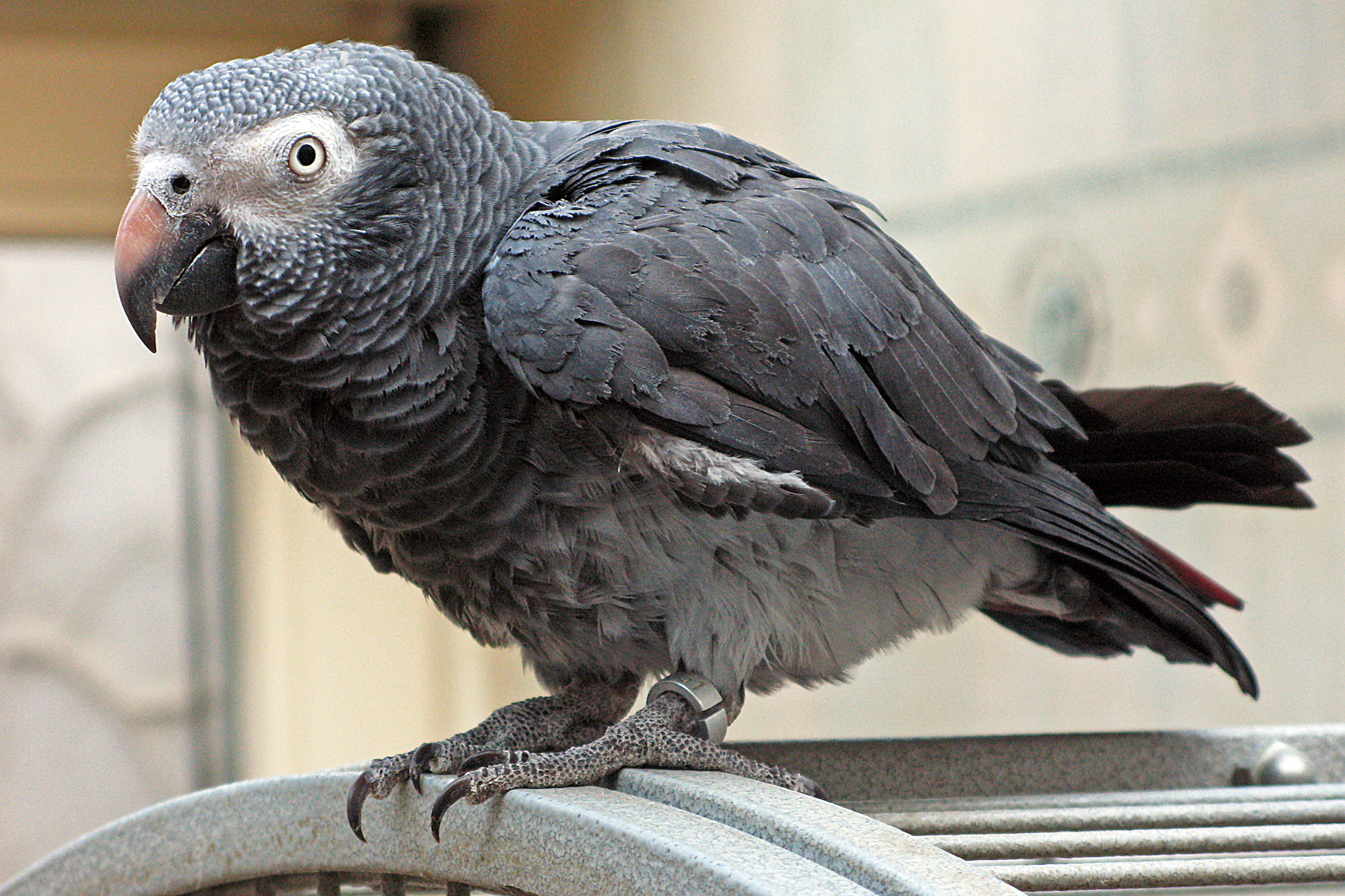
- In captivity

Conservation status
- Endangered (IUCN 3.1)

Scientific classification
- Kingdom: Animalia
- Phylum: Chordata
- Class: Aves
- Order: Psittaciformes
- Family: Psittacidae
- Genus: Psittacus
- Species: P. timneh

Binomial name
- Psittacus timneh Fraser, 1844
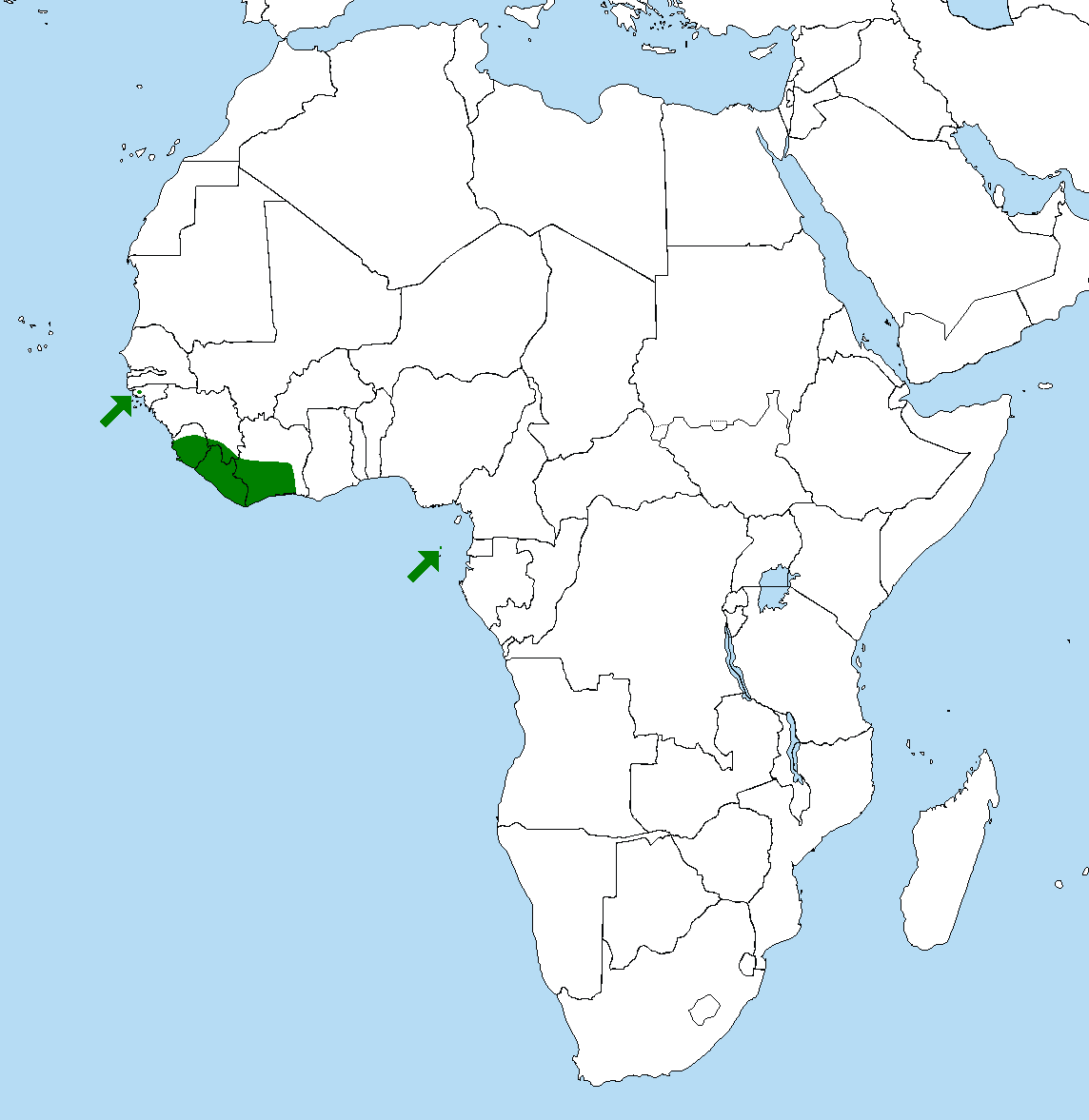
- Range

Synonyms
- Psittacus erithacus timneh

= Timneh parrot =

Species of bird

The Timneh parrot (Psittacus timneh), also known as the Timneh grey parrot or Timneh African grey parrot, is a West African parrot. Formerly classified as a subspecies of the grey parrot Psittacus erithacus timneh, it is now considered a full species Psittacus timneh. In aviculture, it is often referred to by the initials TAG and is commonly kept as a companion parrot.

== Taxonomy ==
The Timneh parrot was formally described in 1844 by the British zoologist and collector Louis Fraser. He coined the binomial name Psittacus timneh and specified the type locality as "Timneh country, Sierra Leone". The Temne are an ethnic group that are predominantly found in the Northern Province of Sierra Leone. The Timneh parrot was formerly classified as a subspecies of the grey parrot but is now treated as a separate species based on the results of a genetic and morphological study published in 2007.

Two subspecies are recognised:

- P. t. timneh Fraser, 1844 – south Guinea to Sierra Leone, Liberia, Mali and west Ivory Coast
- Príncipe grey parrot (P. t. princeps) Alexander, 1909 – Príncipe, an island off the west coast of Africa

The Clements Checklist classifies the Príncipe grey parrot as a subspecies of the grey parrot instead.

== Description ==
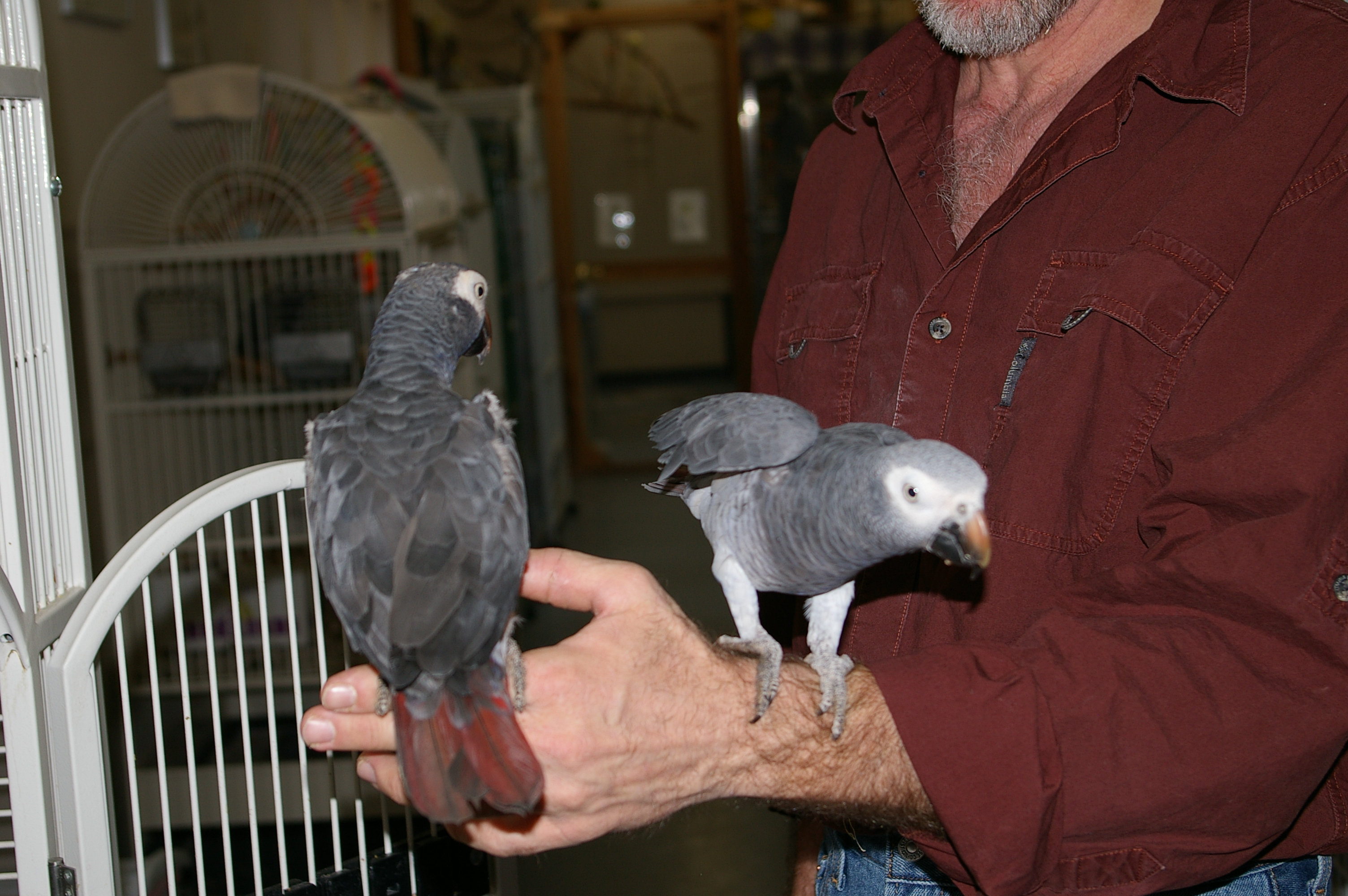
Showing dull maroon tail

Growing to 28–33 centimetres (11–13 in) in length and weighing 275–375 grams (9.7–13.2 oz), the Timneh is a medium-sized parrot. Its plumage is mainly a mottled grey, with a white face mask and pale yellow eyes. Compared with the only other recognised Psittacus species, the grey parrot (P. erithacus), the Timneh is smaller and darker, with a dull, dark maroon (rather than crimson) tail and a horn-coloured patch on the upper mandible. Like the grey parrot, the Timneh parrot is one of the most intelligent bird species. The Timneh parrot may be more outgoing around human beings, and can learn to talk at a younger age than the grey parrot.

== Distribution and habitat ==
The Timneh parrot is endemic to the western parts of the moist Upper Guinean forests and bordering savannas of West Africa from Guinea-Bissau, Sierra Leone and southern Mali eastwards to at least 70 km east of the Bandama River in Ivory Coast and in the southern part of Ghana. There is no natural range overlap with the grey parrot although, as both taxa are common in aviculture, escapes can occur and hybridization between greys and Timnehs has been observed in captivity. The birds typically inhabit dense forest, but are also seen at forest edges and in clearings, in gallery forest along waterways, savanna woodland and mangroves. Though they are sometimes found in cultivated areas and gardens, it is not clear whether these habitats contain self-sustaining populations; the birds may make seasonal movements out of the driest parts of their range in the dry season.

== Status, threats and conservation ==
Of a total estimated population of 120,000–259,000 individual birds, the largest populations are in Ivory Coast (54,000–130,000) and Liberia (50,000–100,000). In the other range countries, estimated numbers are Sierra Leone (11,000–18,000), Guinea (5,000–10,000) and Guinea-Bissau (100–1,000), with insignificant numbers in southern Mali. Surveys indicate that the species has disappeared from the forests around Mount Nimba and in Nimba County, Liberia.

The Timneh parrot has been undergoing population decline both through the loss of its forest habitat and trapping for the international wild bird trade. The fragmentation and loss of forests, as well as climatic changes, has become a major factor in the food availability for parrots. The species ability to track food (such as plants and plant parts including fruits, seeds, flowers, leaf buds, and sap) and switch diets determines the species ability to cope with environmental changes; it is a contributory factor to the population decline of the Timneh parrot. Along with the closely related Congo grey parrot, it is one of the most popular pet birds in the United States, Europe and the Middle East due to its longevity and ability to mimic human speech.

In January 2007, the CITES' Animals Committee imposed a two-year ban on exports of Timneh parrots from Sierra Leone, Liberia, Ivory Coast and Guinea, while the importation of wild-caught birds into the EU was banned in the same year. Despite this, in 2009, Guinea exported 720 birds. The legal trade, which is monitored by CITES, may constitute only a small proportion of the total numbers trapped in the wild.

In 2012, BirdLife International gave the Timneh parrot full species status on the basis of genetic, morphological, plumage and vocal differences and classified it as Endangered in 2016.
