= Kosik (elephant) =

Elephant in South Korea (born 1990)

- Kosik vocalising.
- Species: Indian elephant (Elephas maximus)
- Sex: Male
- Born: 1990 (age 35–36)
- Known for: Imitating human speech, particularly Korean language.
- Residence: Everland theme park, Everland Resort, Yongin, South Korea
- Weight: 5.5 tonnes (6.1 short tons)
- Height: 3.5 m (11 ft)

Korean name
- Hangul: 코식
- RR: Kosik
- MR: K'osik

Kosik (Korean: 코식; born 1990) is a male Indian elephant (Elephas maximus) in the Everland theme park in Yongin, South Korea. He made headlines in September 2006 when it was discovered he could imitate the Korean words for "yes" (네), "no" (아니요), "sit" (앉아), "lie down" (누워), and four other words. He makes the sounds by putting his trunk in his mouth and shaking it while exhaling, similar to the way a human whistles with fingers in their mouth. Kwon Su-wan, director of the zoo in Seoul, said: "We plan to conduct further studies with keepers, veterinarians and scientists on whether Kosik understands the meaning of these words as he speaks them."

Like most cases of talking animals, claims are subject to the observer-expectancy effect, which may be a meaningless form of mimicry and which are subject to fabrication for many reasons.

== See also ==
- Batyr (elephant)
- Kanzi
- NOC
- List of individual elephants
