= Irene Pepperberg =

American scientist of animal cognition (born 1949)

Irene Pepperberg FAAAS
- Born: Irene Maxine Platzblatt; April 1, 1949 (age 77); New York City, United States
- Years active: 1977–present
- Known for: work with Alex

Academic background
- Education: Massachusetts Institute of Technology School of Science (1969); Harvard University (1971)

Academic work
- Institutions: Brandeis University; Harvard University; University of Arizona; MIT Media Lab; Purdue University
- Main interests: animal cognition

Irene Maxine Pepperberg (born April 1, 1949; née Irene Maxine Platzblatt) is an American scientist noted for her studies in animal cognition, particularly in relation to parrots. She has been a professor, researcher and lecturer at multiple universities, and she is currently an Adjunct Research Professor at Boston University. Pepperberg also serves on the Advisory Council of METI International (Messaging Extraterrestrial Intelligence). She is well known for her comparative studies into the cognitive fundamentals of language and communication, and she was one of the first to work on language learning in animals other than primate species (exemplified by the Washoe project), by extension to a bird species. Pepperberg is also active in wildlife conservation, especially in relation to parrots.

== Early life, family and education ==
Born in 1949 as Irene Platzblatt in Brooklyn, New York City, New York, she was an only child. Her father, Robert Platzblatt, was a biochemist and middle school teacher. Her parents were both first-generation American Jews. Her mother's parents were from Romania, and her father's from Lithuania. In the 1950s, the family resided in Brooklyn in an apartment above a store, and beginning at a very young age, Irene would own and train a series of budgies.

She earned her bachelor's degree in chemistry from the Massachusetts Institute of Technology in 1969, and brought one of her budgies there with her. She subsequently earned a master's degree in chemistry in 1971 at Harvard University, followed by a doctorate in chemical physics in 1976 at Harvard. During her doctoral program, she saw an episode of the PBS TV series Nova about animals and language, which influenced her to focus on that instead of chemistry.

== Work history ==
Pepperberg has been a researcher, lecturer and adjunct or visiting professor at multiple universities. She was a research associate and lecturer at Purdue University (1979–1984) and Harvard University (in the 1970s and since 2005). At the MIT Media Lab, she has been a visiting associate professor (1999–2000) and researcher (2001–02). While at Purdue, she was involved in the biological sciences and psychological sciences departments. At the University of Arizona, she was an associate professor in Ecology and Evolutionary Biology with joint appointment in the psychology department and in the neuroscience program (1991–2000). She has been a Bunting Fellow at the Radcliffe Institute for Advanced Study (2004–2005) and an adjunct associate professor at Brandeis University (2002–2013), where its bird laboratory was named for her.

== Research work ==
Although parrots have long been known for their capacities in vocal mimicry, Pepperberg set out to show that their vocal behavior could have the characteristics of human language. She worked intensively with a single grey parrot, Alex, and reported that he acquired a large vocabulary and used it in a sophisticated way, which is often described as similar to that of a four-year-old child. Alex could understand labels to describe objects, colors, shapes, and materials. Pepperberg and her colleagues sought to show that Alex could differentiate meaning and syntax, so that his use of vocal communication was unlike the relatively inflexible forms of "instinctive" communication that are widespread in the animal kingdom. Although such results are always likely to be controversial, and working intensively with a single animal always incurs the risk of Clever Hans effects, Pepperberg's work has strengthened the argument that humans do not hold the monopoly on the complex or semi-complex use of abstract communication. With interspecies communication, Pepperberg speculated that grey parrots are comparable to primates, having similar social systems.

Some researchers believe that the training method that Pepperberg used with Alex, (called the model/rival technique) holds promise for teaching autistic and other learning-disabled children who have difficulty learning language and communication skills, numerical concepts and empathy. When some autistic children were taught using the same methods Pepperberg devised to teach parrots, their response exceeded expectations.

From work with the single subject Alex, Pepperberg and her colleagues have gone on to study additional grey parrots, and also parrots of other species. Other notable parrot subjects of her research have been Griffin, Arthur, and Athena. Alex was found dead on the morning of September 6, 2007, and was seemingly healthy the previous day. Alex's necropsy revealed no discernible cause of death, though it was later stated to be "either a fatal arrhythmia, heart attack or stroke" associated with arteriosclerosis.

== Model/rival technique ==
The model/rival technique involves two trainers, one to give instructions, and one to model correct and incorrect responses and to act as the student's rival for the trainer's attention; the model and trainer also exchange roles so that the student sees that the process is fully interactive. The parrot, in the role of student, tries to reproduce the correct behavior.

The use of this model/rival technique resulted in Alex identifying objects by color, shape, number and material at about the level of chimpanzees and dolphins. His language abilities were equivalent to those of a 2-year-old child and he had the problem solving skills of a 5-year-old. Alex was learning the alphabet, had a vocabulary of 150 words, knew the names of 50 objects and could count up to eight when he died. He could also answer questions about objects.

Pepperberg countered critics' claims that Alex had been taught a script by explaining that the controls and tests she used made it impossible for him simply to recite words when she asked questions. The Clever Hans effect did not apply, she argued, as Alex would talk to anyone, not just to her. Building on Pepperberg's research, cognitive scientist Michael Trestman has argued that scaffolding and modeling, both approaches that the model/rival technique utilizes, can account for the cognitive evolution in humans, including "language, advanced social cognition, and elaborate forms of tool craft."

Pepperberg's implementation of the model/rival technique has been used to successfully train several other parrots, such as Apollo.

== Alex Foundation ==
Pepperberg is president of The Alex Foundation, a not-for-profit 501(c)(3) organization, which she started. The foundation supports Pepperberg and her team's research. In a 2006 interview, Pepperberg said that the foundation was her only funding source, having lost her paid research position due to a funding crunch at MIT's Media Lab, although the reporter of that interview does not mention her research associate position at Harvard University since 2005. The Alex Foundation raises money through donations, from direct sale of parrot-related gifts, and indirectly from sales through sponsoring businesses.

== AI research ==
Some researchers have suggested that studying avian cognition might allow a useful artificial intelligence to be built without requiring as much resources, as for some applications a parrot or corvid level complexity brain would be adequate such as for image sorting. In recent years it was found that pigeons could sort CT scan data as well as microscope slides with equal or better accuracy than a human expert with only weeks of behavioral training needed.

== Personal life ==
Pepperberg was married for more than 20 years to David Pepperberg, a neuroscientist. They divorced in 1997.

== Awards and honors ==
- 2009, Christopher Award, for Alex & Me

== Works ==
- The Alex Studies: Cognitive and Communicative Abilities of Grey Parrots by Irene Maxine Pepperberg. ISBN 0-674-00806-5.
- Animal Cognition in Nature: The Convergence of Psychology and Biology in Laboratory and Field by Russell P. Balda, Irene M. Pepperberg, A. C. Kamil. ISBN 0-12-077030-X.
- Alex & Me: How a Scientist and a Parrot Discovered a Hidden World of Animal Intelligence--and Formed a Deep Bond in the Process, by Irene M. Pepperberg ISBN 978-0061673986
- Beyond Words, by Laura Maria Censabella. Drama inspired by the life story of Irene Pepperberg and Alex. World premiere directed by Cassie Chapados at Central Square Theater in Cambridge, Massachusetts, in March 2024.

== See also ==
- Alice Auersperg
- Bird intelligence
