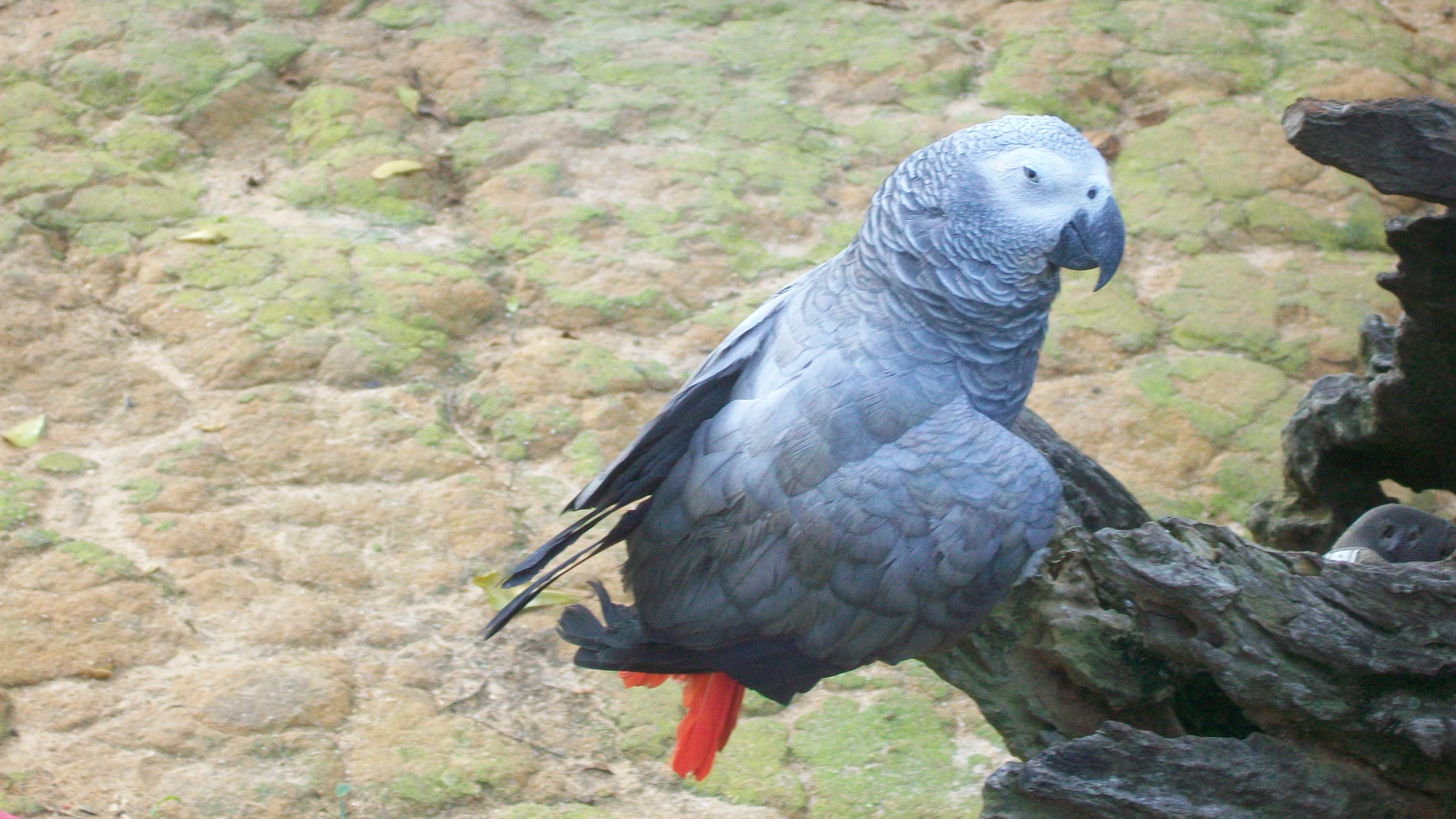
- In Douala, Cameroon

Conservation status
- Endangered (IUCN 3.1)
- CITES Appendix I

Scientific classification
- Kingdom: Animalia
- Phylum: Chordata
- Class: Aves
- Order: Psittaciformes
- Family: Psittacidae
- Genus: Psittacus
- Species: P. erithacus

Binomial name
- Psittacus erithacus Linnaeus, 1758
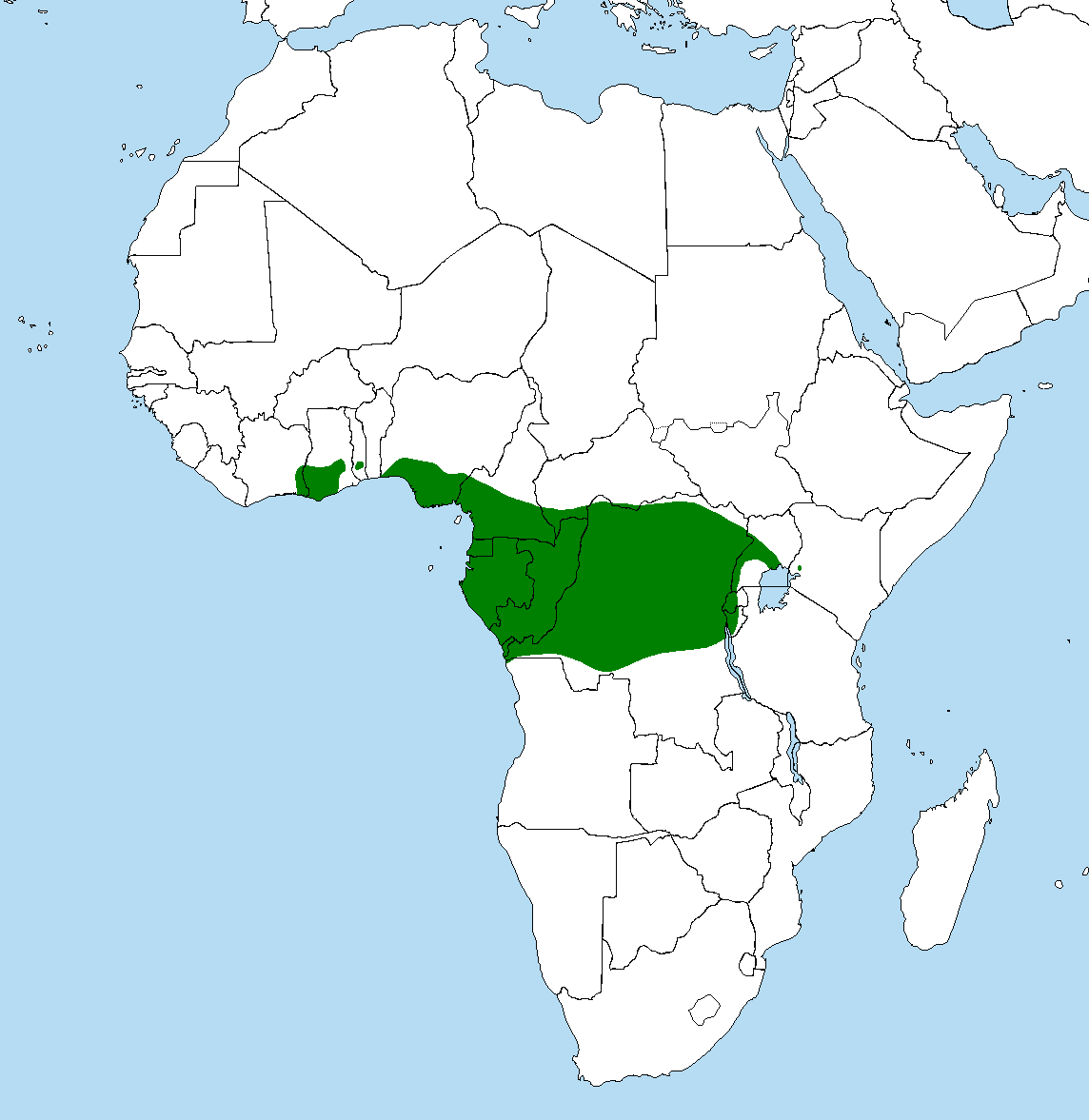
- Range

Synonyms
- Psittacus cinereus Gmelin, 1788

= Grey parrot =

Species of bird

The grey parrot (Psittacus erithacus), also known as the Congo grey parrot, is an African parrot in the family Psittacidae. Psittacus erithacus was previously also known as the African grey parrot until the Timneh parrot (Psittacus timneh), previously treated as a subspecies, was elevated to a full species. The grey parrot is known for its intelligence, being considered one of the smartest bird species and is regarded for its speaking abilities.

== Taxonomy ==
The grey parrot was formally described in 1758 by Swedish naturalist Carl Linnaeus in the tenth edition of Systema Naturae. He placed it with all other parrots in the genus Psittacus and coined the binomial name Psittacus erithacus. Linnaeus erroneously specified the type locality as "Guinea": the locality was later designated as Ghana in West Africa. The genus name is Latin for "parrot". The specific epithet erithacus is Latin and is derived from the Ancient Greek εριθακος (erithakos) for an unknown bird that was said to mimic human sounds, perhaps the black redstart.

The Timneh parrot was formerly treated as a subspecies of the grey parrot, but is now considered a separate species based mainly on results from a genetic and morphological study published in 2007. Although Linnaeus placed all the parrots known to him in the genus Psittacus, only the grey parrot and the Timneh parrot are now assigned to this genus.

The Clements Checklist classifies the Príncipe grey parrot as a subspecies of the grey parrot. It therefore recognises two subspecies:

- P. e. erithacus Linnaeus, 1758–Ivory Coast to Kenya, Tanzania, Príncipe, São Tomé, and Bioko
- Príncipe grey parrot (P. e. principe) Alexander, 1909 – Príncipe, an island off the west coast of Africa

This is in contrast to the IOC, which instead classifies it as a subspecies of the Timneh parrot.

== Distribution and habitat ==
The grey parrot is native to equatorial Africa, including Angola, Cameroon, the Congo, Gabon, Ivory Coast, Ghana, Kenya, and Uganda. The species is found inside a range from Kenya to the eastern part of Ivory Coast. Current estimates for the global population are uncertain and range from 630,000 to 13 million birds. Populations are decreasing worldwide. The species seems to favour dense forests, but can also be found at forest edges and in more open vegetation types, such as gallery and savanna forests.

A population study published in 2015 found that the species had been "virtually eliminated" from Ghana with numbers declining 90 to 99% since 1992. They were found in only 10 of 42 forested areas, and three roosts that once held 700–1200 birds each, now had only 18 in total. Local people mainly blamed the pet trade and the felling of timber for the decline. Populations are thought to be stable in Cameroon. In the Congo, an estimated 15,000 are taken every year for the pet trade, from the eastern part of the country, although the annual quota is stated to be 5,000.

The Florida Fish and Wildlife Conservation Commission indicated they have observed grey parrots escaped or released into South Florida since at least 1984, but no evidence indicates that the population is breeding naturally.

== Description ==
The grey parrot is medium to large sized, predominantly grey and black-billed. Its typical weight is 400 g (14 oz), with an approximate length of 33 cm (13 in), and a wingspan of 46–52 cm (18–20 1/2 in). The head and wings are generally darker than the body. The head and body feathers have slight white edges; the tail feathers are red with occasional black touches.

Both sexes appear similar. Juvenile colouration is similar to that of adults, but typically their eyes are dark grey to black, compared to the adults' yellow irises around dark pupils, and their undertail coverts are tinged with grey. Adults weigh 418–526 g (14 3/4–18 1/2 oz).

Grey parrots may live for 40–60 years in captivity, although their mean lifespan in the wild appears to be shorter — approximately 23 years. They start breeding at an age of 3–5 years and lay 3–5 eggs per brood.

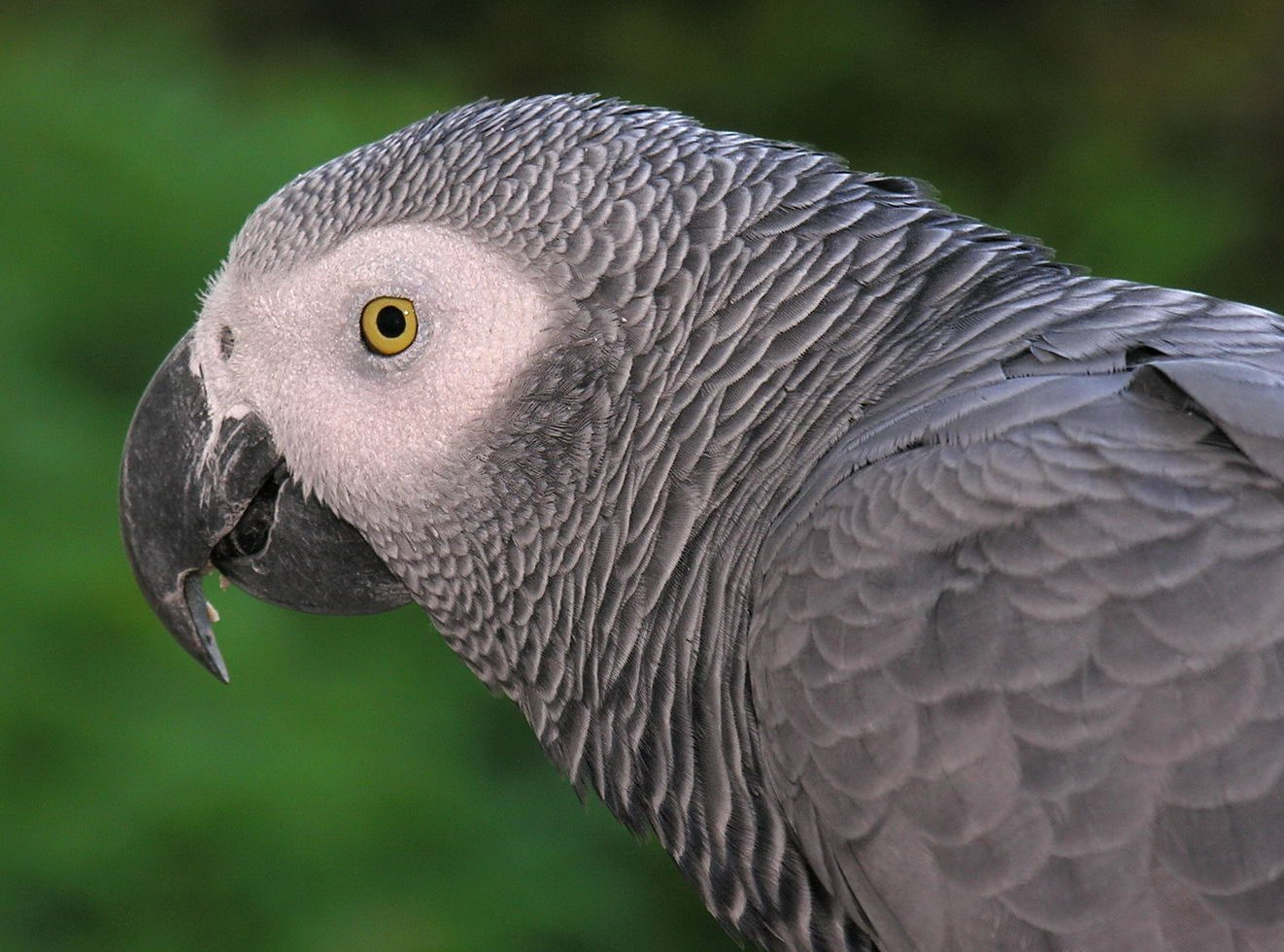
Head

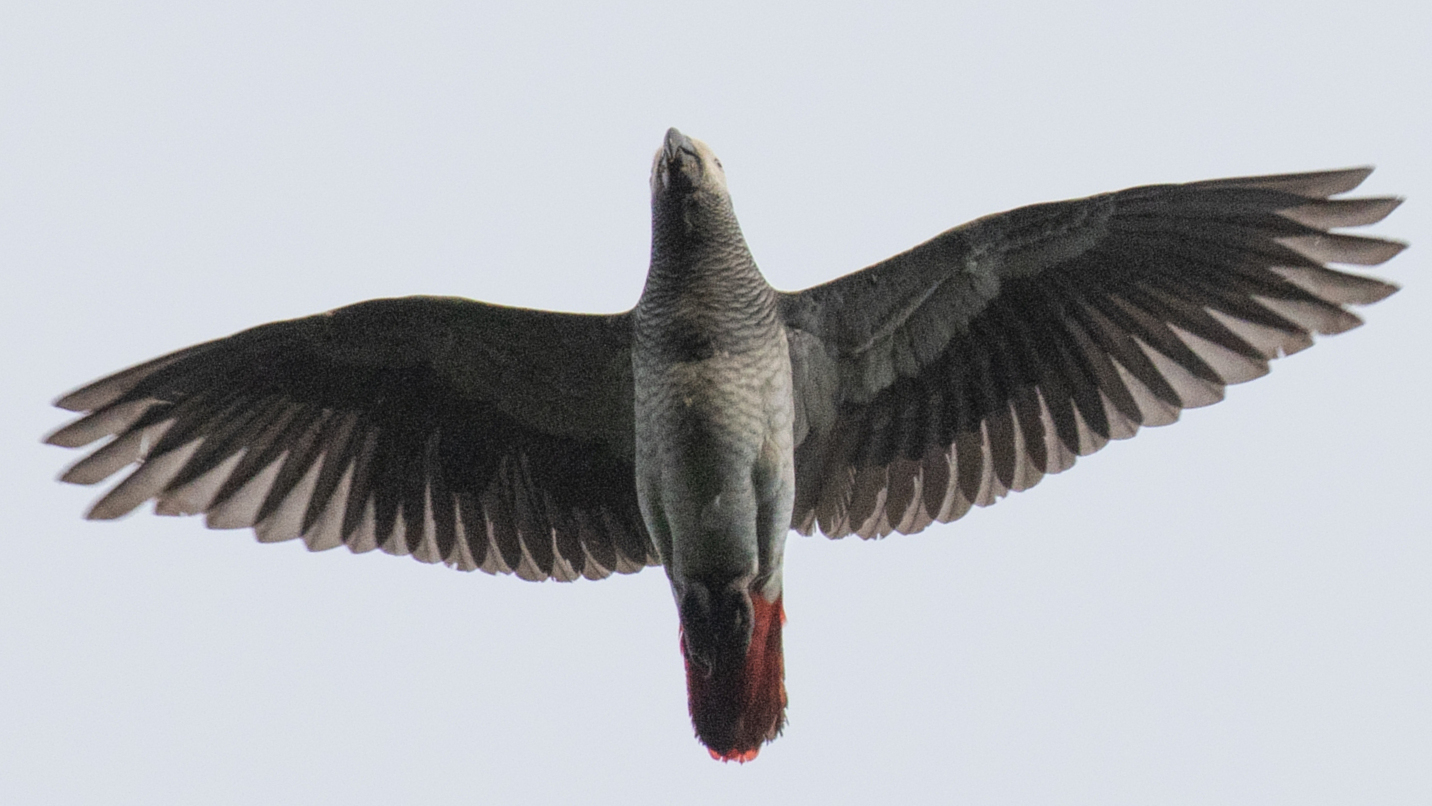
Showing wingspan, in Cameroon

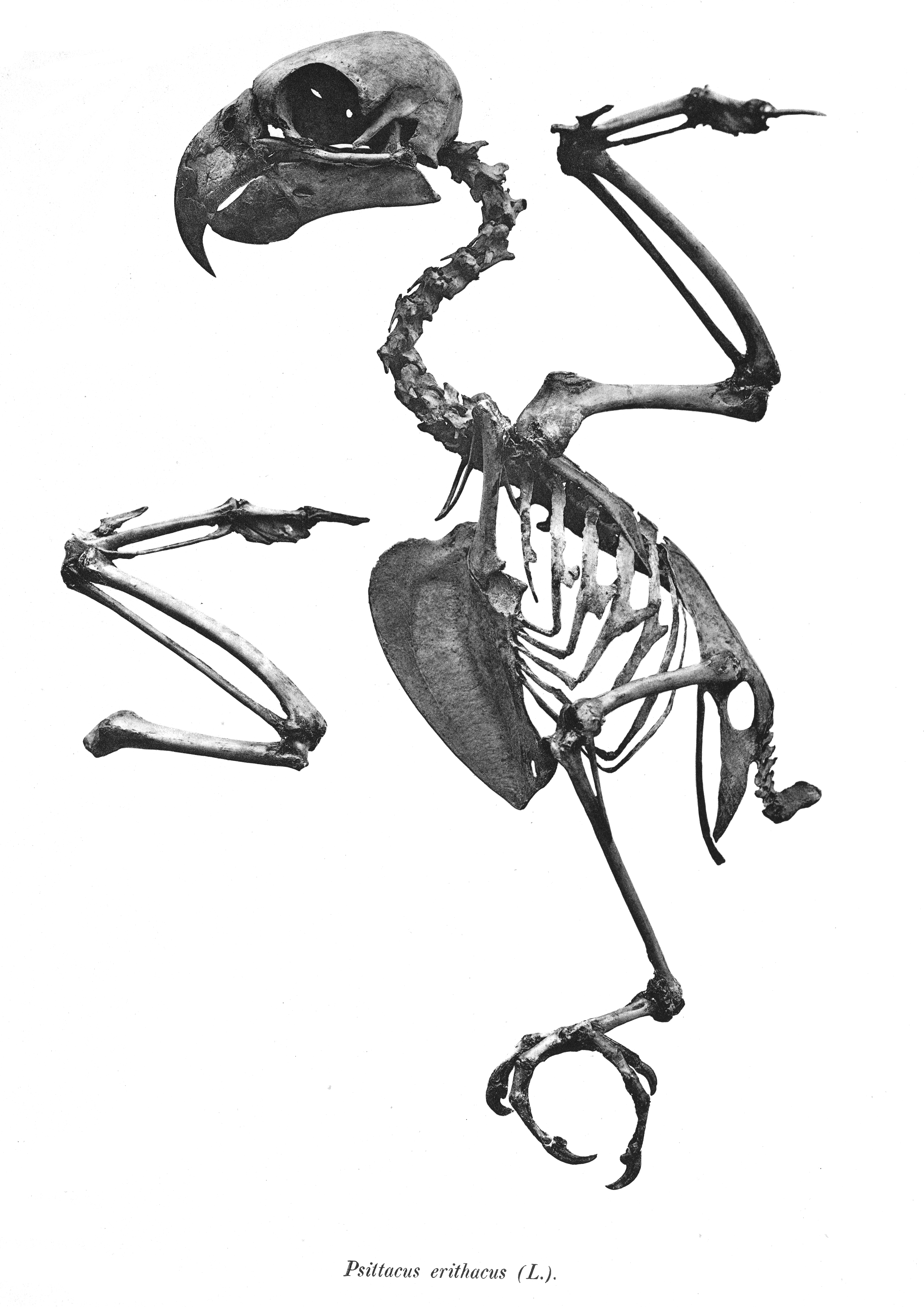
Skeleton

== Behaviour and ecology in the wild ==
Little is known about the behaviour and activities of these birds in the wild. In addition to a lack of research funding, it can be particularly difficult to study these birds in wild situations due to their status as prey animals, which leads them to have rather secretive personalities. It has been shown that wild grey parrots may also imitate a wide variety of sounds they hear, much like their captive relatives. In the Democratic Republic of the Congo, two greys sound-recorded while roosting reportedly had a repertoire of over 200 different calls, including nine imitations of other wild bird songs and one of a bat.

=== Feeding ===
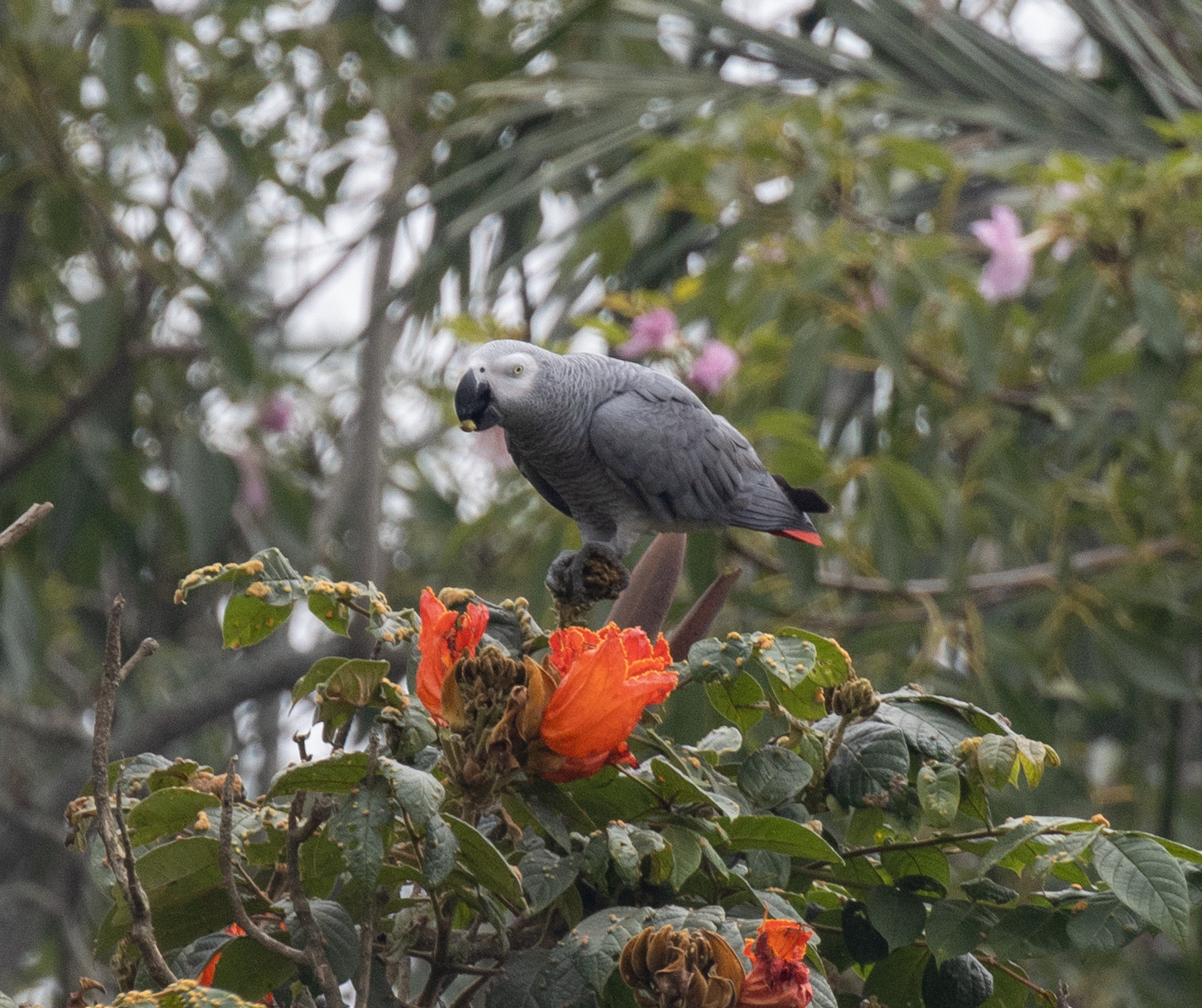
Feeding on African tulip tree (Spathodea campanulata) buds, in Uganda

Grey parrots are mainly frugivorous, with most of their diet consisting of fruit, nuts, and seeds, including oil palm fruit. They sometimes also eat flowers and tree bark, as well as insects and snails. In the wild, the grey parrot is partly a ground feeder.

=== Breeding ===
Grey parrots are monogamous breeders who nest in tree cavities. Each mated pair of parrots needs their own tree for their nest. The hen lays three to five eggs, which she incubates for 30 days while being fed by her mate. The adults defend their nesting sites.

Grey parrot chicks require feeding and care from their parents in the nest. The parents take care of them until 4–5 weeks after they are fledged. Young leave the nest at the age of 12 weeks. Little is known about the courtship behaviour of this species in the wild. They weigh 12–14 g (7/16–1/2 oz) at hatching and 372–526 g (13 1/8–18 1/2 oz) when they leave their parents.

== Conservation ==
Natural predators for this species include palm-nut vultures and several raptors. Monkeys target eggs and the young for food.

Humans are by far the largest threat to wild grey populations. Between 1994 and 2003, more than 359,000 grey parrots were traded on the international market. Approximately 21% of the wild population was being harvested every year. Mortality rates are extremely high between the time they are captured and they reach the market, ranging from 60 to 66%. This species also is hunted for its meat and for its body parts, which are used in traditional medicines. As a result of the extensive harvest of wild birds, in addition to habitat loss, this species is believed to be undergoing a rapid decline in the wild and therefore, has been rated as endangered by the International Union for Conservation of Nature.

In October 2016, the Convention on the International Trade of Endangered Fauna and Flora (CITES) extended the highest level of protection to grey parrots by listing the species under Appendix 1, which regulates international trade in the species.

In 2021, the Kenyan government held a short amnesty, during which grey parrot owners could pay a fee to obtain a permit for their birds and facilitate legal ownership. Following the expiry of this time period, it is now illegal to own this species without a permit.

Grey parrots, due to illegal trading in recent years, were listed as Endangered in 2016 on the IUCN Red List.

== In captivity ==
The domestication of grey parrots dates back to 2000 B.C., depicting native birds as pets in Egyptian hieroglyphics. They were considered valuable by the Greeks and the Romans, who kept them in cages.

Speaking

The species is common in captivity and regularly kept by humans as a companion parrot, prized for its ability to mimic human speech, which makes it one of the most popular avian pets. An escaped pet in Japan was returned to his owner after repeating the owner's name and address.

Grey parrots are notorious for mimicking noises heard in their environment and using them tirelessly. They are highly intelligent birds, needing extensive behavioural and social enrichment as well as extensive attention in captivity or else they may become distressed. Feather plucking is a common symptom seen among such distressed grey parrots, affecting up to 40% of captive individuals. They may also be prone to behavioural problems due to their sensitive nature. Social isolation hastens stress and aging.

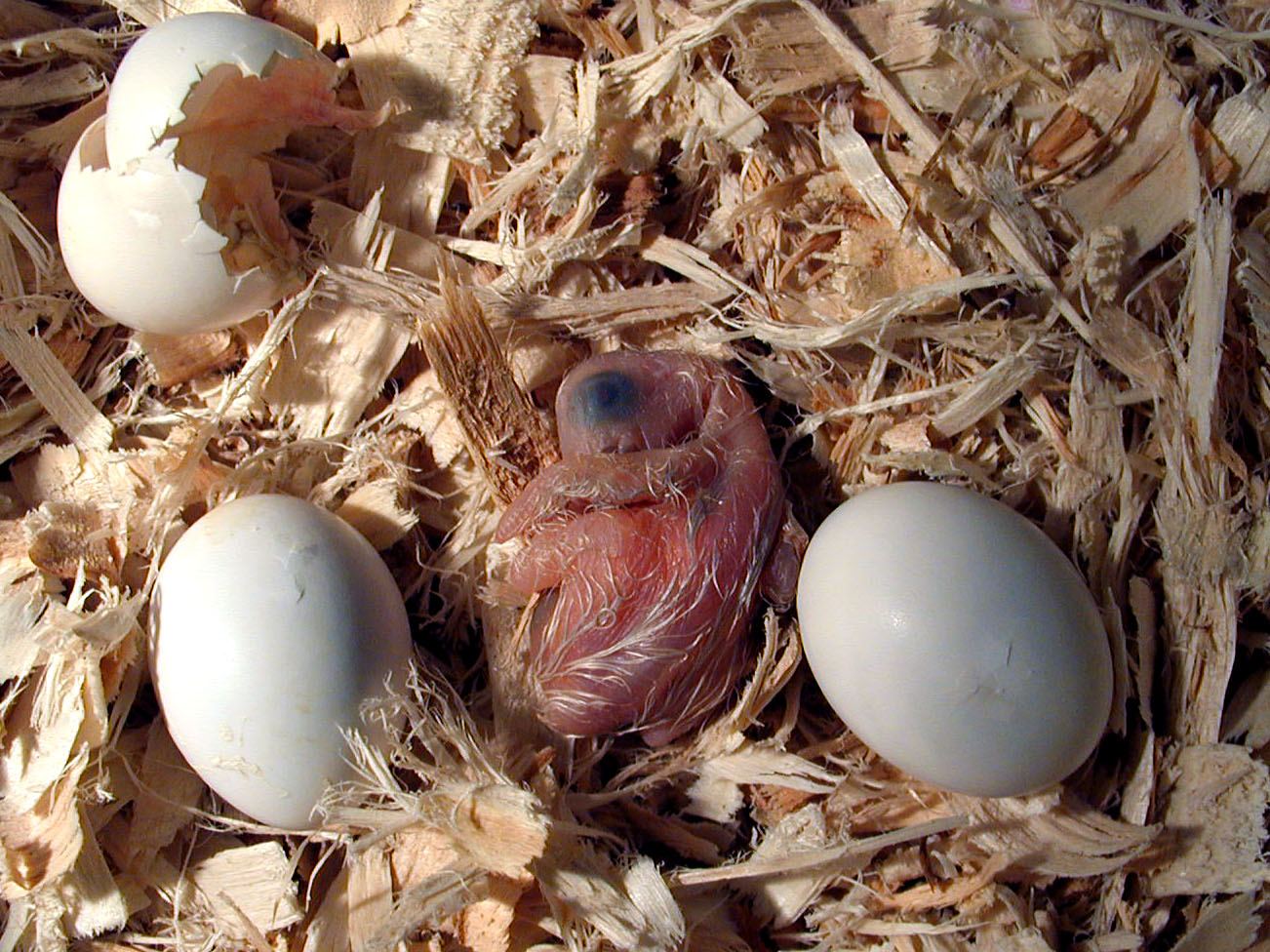
Two eggs and a newly hatched chick

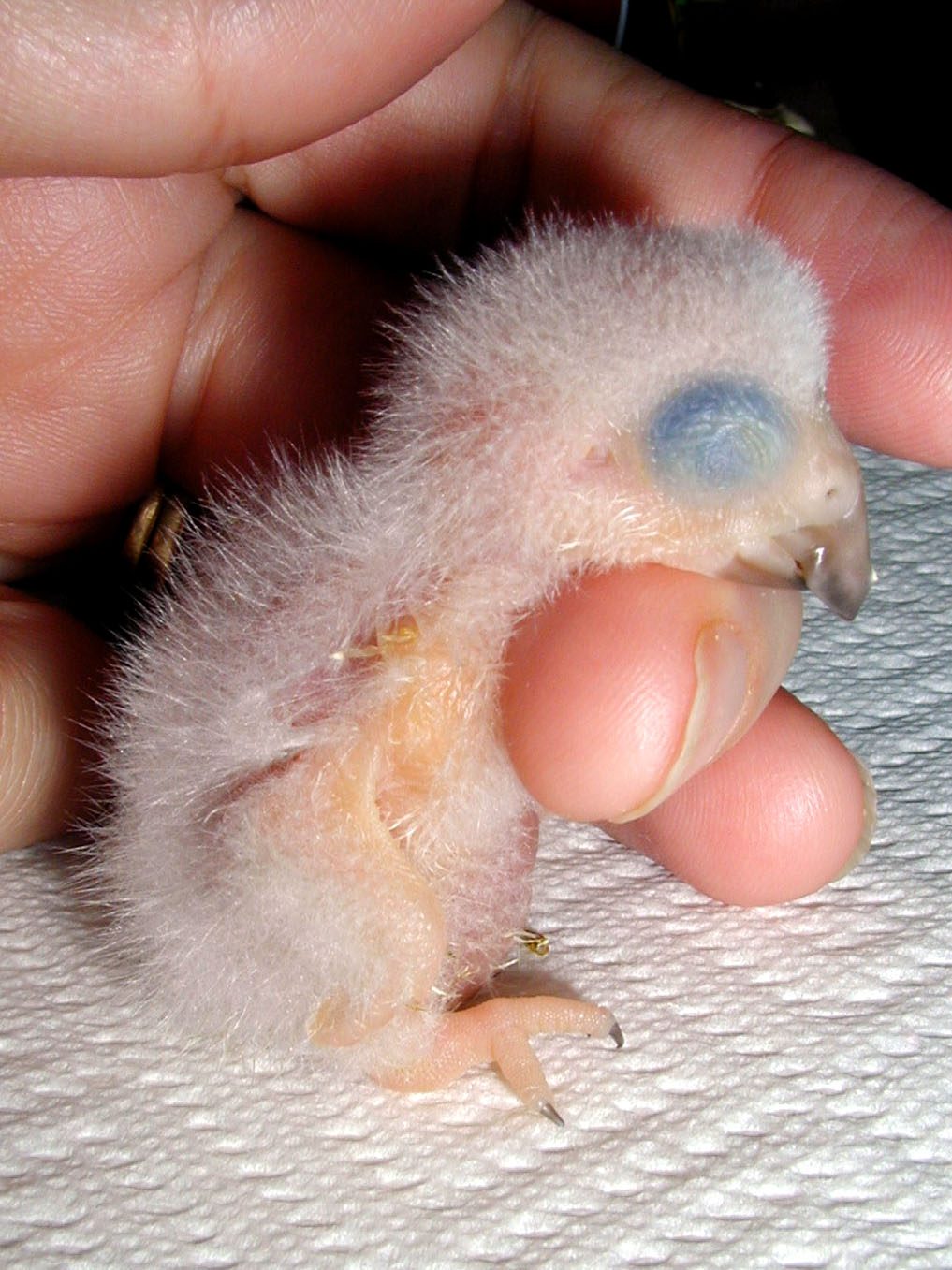
One-day-old chick

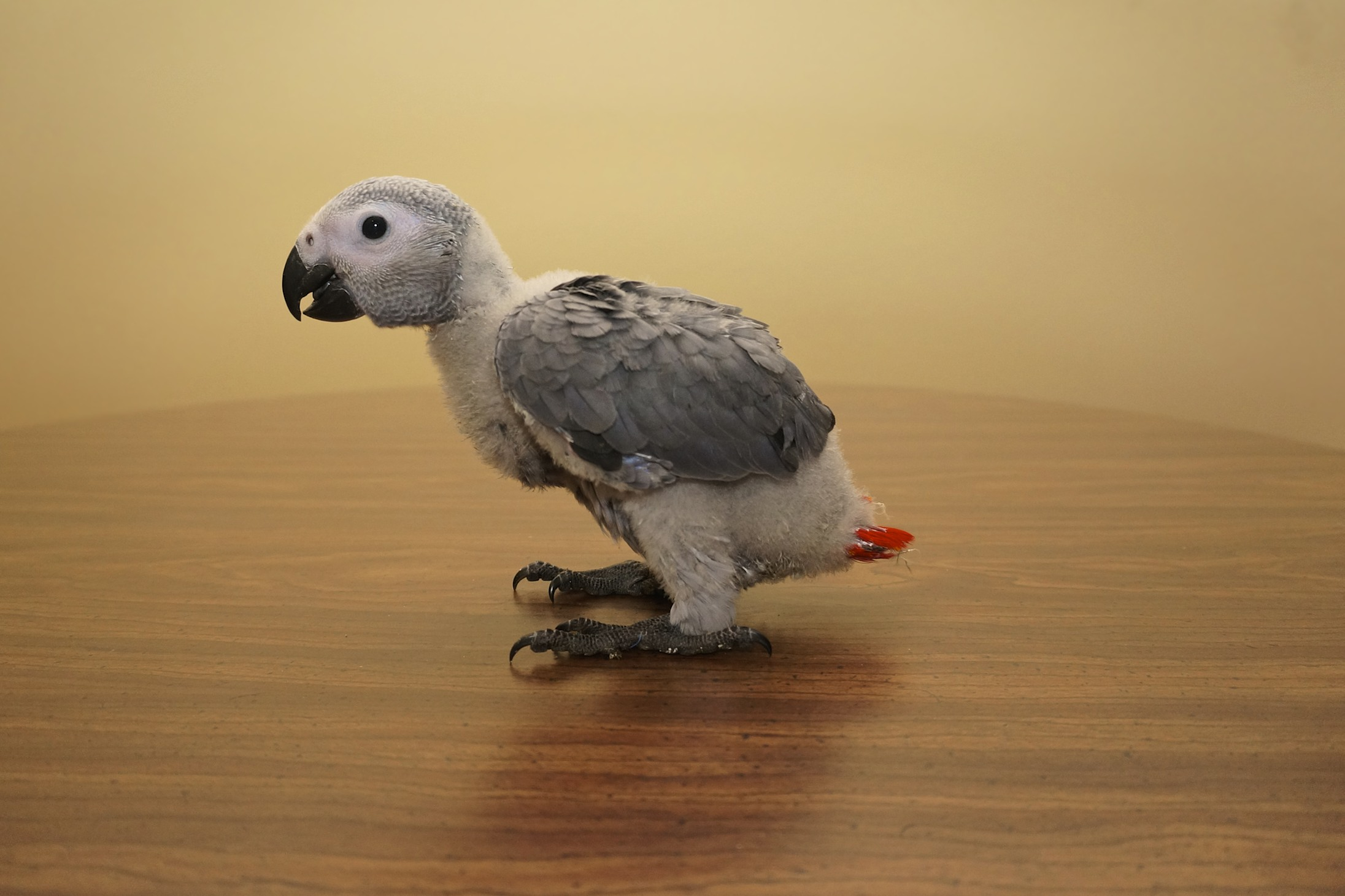
Approximately 5 to 6 week-old chick

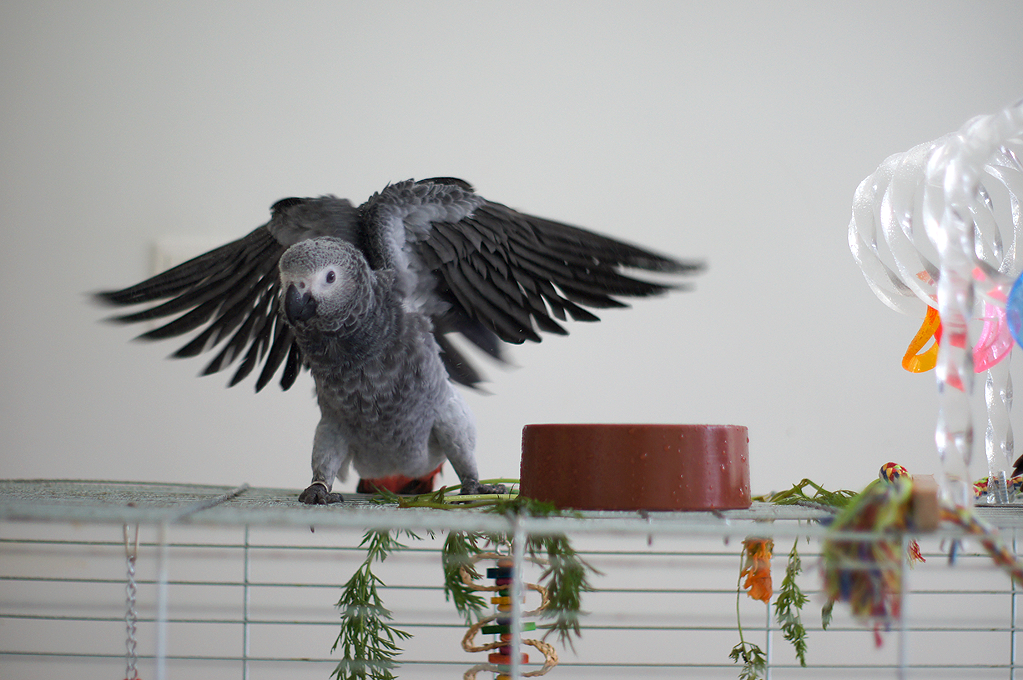
13 week-old chick
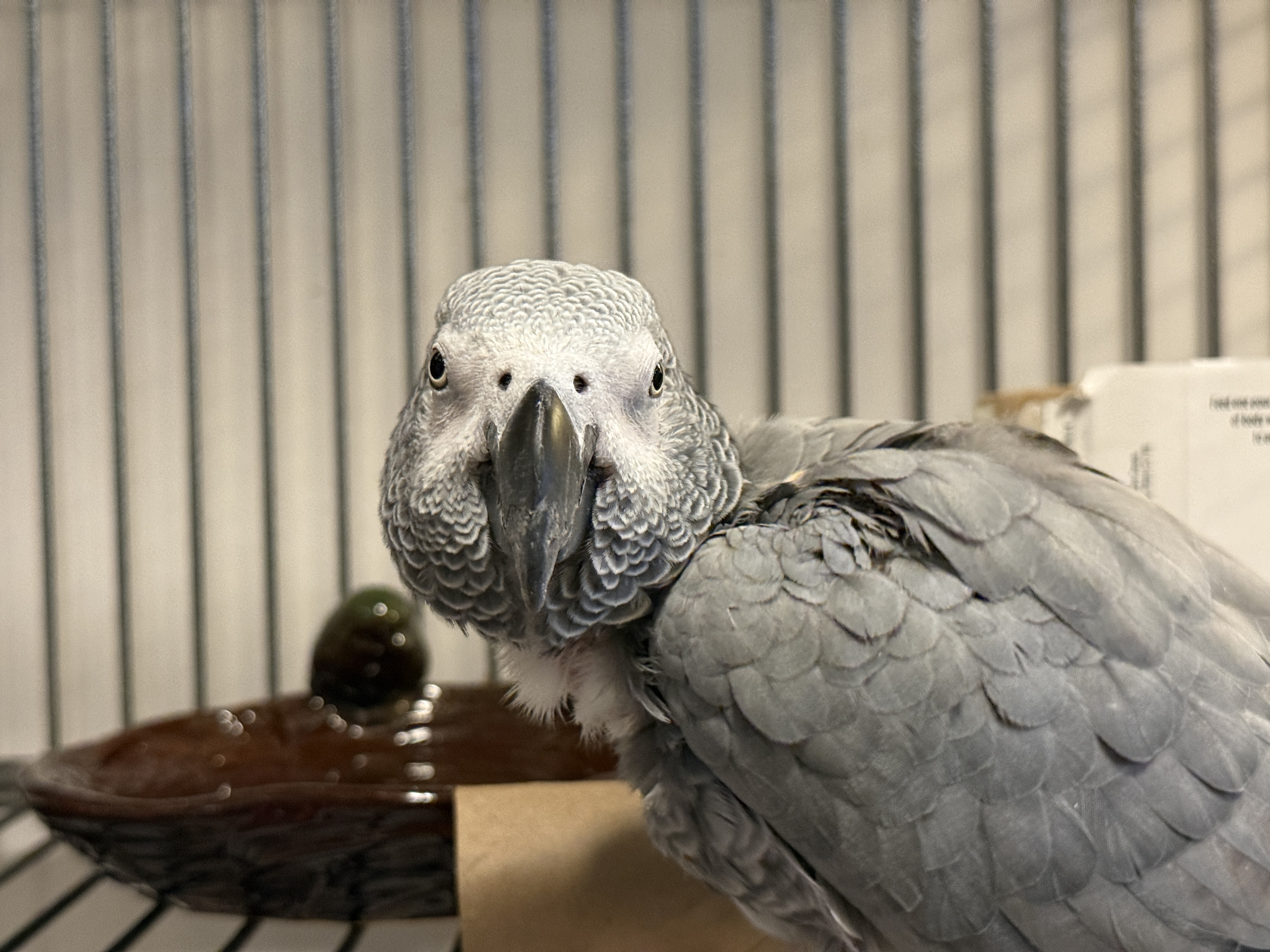
Front view of a 35 year old Congo grey

The grey parrot is a highly social species which relies on a flock-type structure, even when raised in captivity. Because they are so dependent on the other birds within their flock, much of their speech and vocal ability is acquired through interaction with the humans with whom they reside. Both wild and captive parrots have been shown to use contact calls, which allow them to interact with their flock mates and communicate information about their location, detection of predators, availability of food, and safety status. In addition, contact calls are used to form strong social bonds with their flock mates, or in the case of captive greys, with their human housemates. In captivity, they have been shown to display communicative competence, meaning they not only use human language correctly, but also in such a way that is appropriate for the social situation which they are in.

In January 2024, keepers at the Lincolnshire Wildlife Park in Friskney, England, moved a notorious group of eight swearing parrots into a group of more than 100 birds in an attempt to "dilute" their excessive profane mimicry.

=== Diet ===
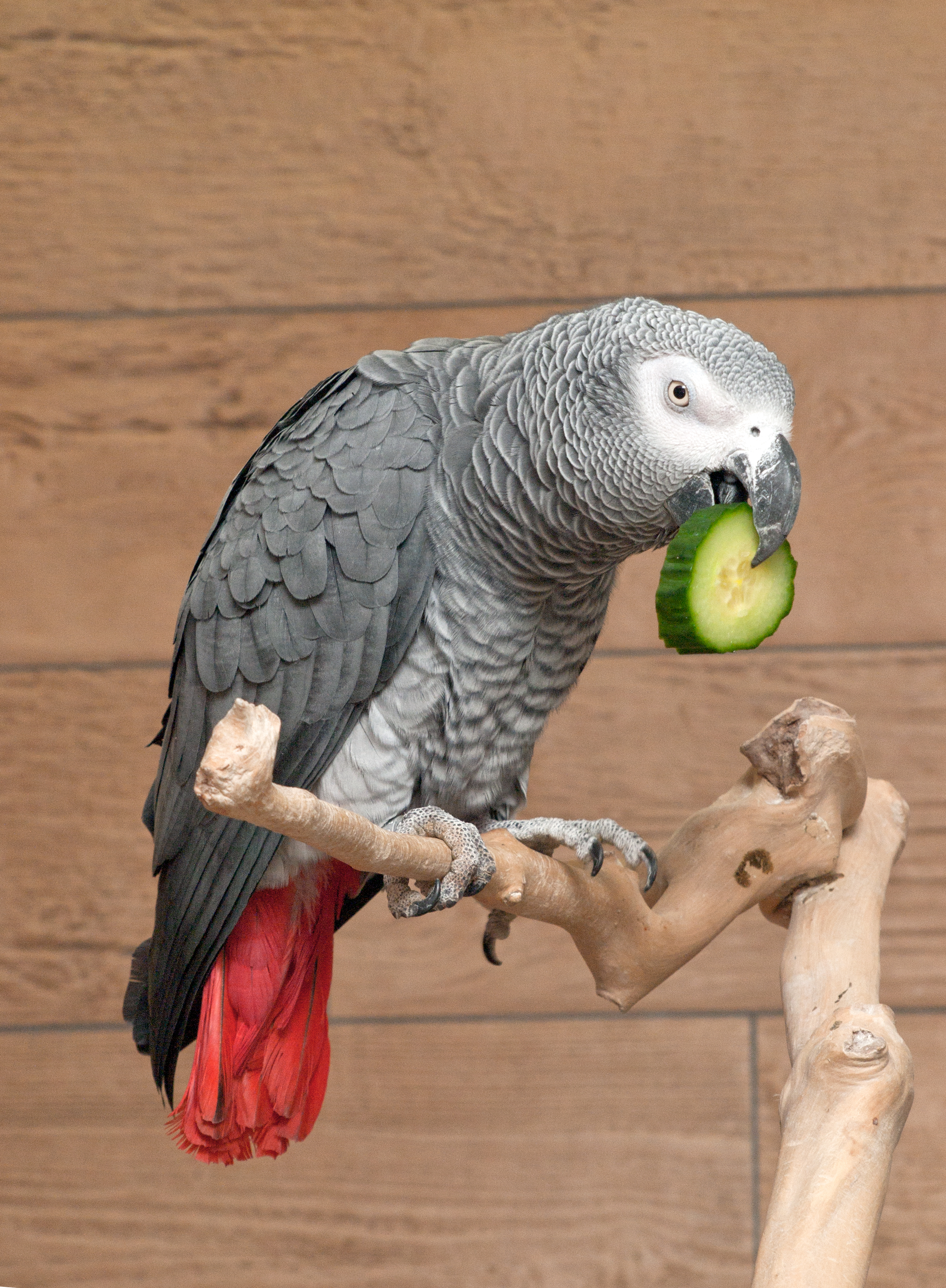
A pet grey parrot eating a cucumber slice

In captivity, grey parrots may be fed bird pellets, a variety of fruits such as pear, orange, pomegranate, apple, and banana, and vegetables such as carrot, cooked sweet potato, celery, fresh kale, green beans and peas. The birds also need a source of calcium.

=== Disease ===
Grey parrots in captivity have been observed to be susceptible to fungal infections, bacterial infections, nutritional insufficiency, malignant tumors, psittacine beak and feather disease, tapeworms, and blood-worms. Young grey parrots are more commonly infected by psittacine beak and feather disease than adults. Infected birds show symptoms such as loss of appetite, fluffy feathers, sluggishness, and reduced walking abilities due to brittle bones.

Grey parrots are more likely to have rhinitis, an inflammatory and infectious disease of the nasal cavity. Birds may exhibit signs such as wheezing, sneezing, nasal snuffling, and swelling or occlusion of the nares. Treatment options include gentle debridement and nasal irrigation.

=== Intelligence and cognition ===
Grey parrots are considered one of the most intelligent psittacine species and among the most intelligent bird species. Many individuals have been shown to perform some tasks at the cognitive level of a four- to six-year-old human child. Several studies have been conducted indicating a suite of higher-level cognitive abilities. Experiments have shown grey parrots can learn number sequences and can learn to associate human voices with the faces of the humans who create them. It has been reported that grey parrots are capable of using existing English words to create new labels for objects when the bird does not know the name of the object, for example "banerry" ("banana" + "cherry") for "apple", "banana crackers" for "dried banana chips" or "yummy bread" for "cake".

American scientist Irene Pepperberg's research with Alex the parrot pioneered studies of bird intelligence and demonstrated his ability to learn more than 100 words, differentiating among objects, colours, materials, and shapes. Pepperberg spent several decades working with Alex and wrote numerous scientific papers on experiments performed, indicating the bird's advanced cognitive abilities. One such study found that Alex could add numbers as well as having a zero-like concept, similar to that of young children and apes.

In addition to their striking cognitive abilities, grey parrots have displayed altruistic behaviour and concern for others. Researchers found that while blue-headed macaws were unlikely to share a nut with other members of their own species, grey parrots would actively give their conspecific partner a nut even if it meant they would not be able to get one themselves. When the roles were reversed, their partners were overwhelmingly likely to return the favour, forgoing their own nut to their partner's benefits. This indicates not only a display of selflessness but also an act of reciprocity.

A 2012 study demonstrated that captive grey parrots have individual musical preferences. When presented with the opportunity to choose between two different pieces of music via a touch screen monitor located in their cage, the two birds in the test consistently chose different songs, to which they then danced and sang along. Some pet grey parrots have also been observed using the music feature of smart speakers to verbally request playback of specific favoured songs.

Some research has shown that foot preference can be linked to the number of words a particular parrot may know and use. Researchers found grey parrots who prefer to use their right foot showed a marked increase in the number of words within their lexicon as compared to left-footed parrots. Scientists postulate that parrots may have lateralization of brain function, much as mammals do.

In two murder trials, there was consideration to use the deceased victim's pet grey parrot's "testimony" as evidence due to the parrot's witnessing and repeating the victim's last words. In the 1993 murder trial of Gary Joseph Rasp, the defendant was accused of murdering Jane Gill. Public defender Charles Ogulnik wanted to use Jane's pet grey parrot Max to prove Gary's innocence, due to Max repeating Jane's last words, "Richard, no, no, no!". In the 2017 murder trial of Glenna Duram, the defendant was accused of murdering her husband Martin Duram. The prosecutor explored the possibility of using the couple's pet parrot Bud as evidence when Bud kept repeating Martin's last words, "Don't fucking shoot."

=== Mutations ===
Grey mutations occur naturally in the wild, such as the Blue Ino (albino), the Incomplete Ino, and the Blue varieties. The Blue Ino is all white. The Incomplete Ino has light pigmentation. The Blue has a white tail.

Due to selection by breeders, some captive grey parrots are partly or completely red. Breeders from South Africa, Australia, New Zealand, and Scandinavia have bred grey parrots intensively since the 1800s. These bred varieties include the Red Pied, F2 Pied, Grizzles, Ino, Incomplete, Parino, Lutino, Cinnamon, and Red Factor. South African bird breeder Von van Antwerpen and New Zealand partner Jaco Bosman selected F2 Pieds and created the first Red Factor Greys. They are rare, may be predominantly red-pigmented, and vary in price depending upon the extent of the red plumage displayed.

== See also ==
- List of individual birds
