= James Jackson =

James Jackson may refer to:

== Military ==
- James Jackson (British Army officer) (1790–1871), British Army general
- James S. Jackson (1823–1862), Union General in the American Civil War
- James W. Jackson (c. 1824–1861), shooter of Elmer Ellsworth during the American Civil War
- James Jackson (colonial administrator), British Army officer, acting commandant of St Mary's Island, 1829–1830
- James Jackson (Medal of Honor) (1833–1916), U.S. Army officer
- James F. Jackson (born 1951), Lieutenant General in the United States Air Force

== Politics ==
- James Jackson (Georgia politician) (1757–1806), Revolutionary War soldier, Georgia congressman, senator and governor
- James Jackson (Alabama politician) (1782–1840), businessman, racehorse investor, state legislator
- James Jackson (congressman) (1819–1887), Georgia Congressman, grandson of Senator James Jackson
- James M. Jackson (1825–1901), West Virginia Congressman
- James Jackson Jr. (New York politician) (c. 1826–1891), New York politician
- James Jackson (Massachusetts politician) (1881–1952), American politician in Massachusetts
- James K. Jackson, American politician, Secretary of State of Alabama, 1894–1898
- James E. Jackson (1914–2007), American labor unionist, political official and activist
- James H. Jackson (born 1939), American politician, science teacher, coach and businessman in Iowa.
- James Jackson (Rhode Island politician) American politician, member of the Rhode Island state legislature from 2019–2021

== Religion ==
- James Jackson (historian) (died 1770), Anglican clergyman and author
- James Jackson (priest) (1778–1841), Anglican priest
- James Jackson (clergyman) (c. 1789–1851), Canadian Methodist minister

== Science and mathematics ==
- James Caleb Jackson (1811–1895), American nutritionist
- James R. Jackson (1924–2011), American mathematician
- James Jackson (psychologist) (1944–2020), social psychologist and member of the National Science Board
- James A. Jackson (born 1954), British professor of geophysics at Cambridge University

== Sports ==
- James Jackson (footballer, born 1900) (1900–c. 1976), British footballer
- James Jackson (cyclist) (1908–1977), Canadian Olympic cyclist
- James Jackson (American football) (born 1976), American football player
- Boo Jackson (born 1981), American basketball player

== Other ==
- James Jackson (steelmaker) (1771–1829), English manufacturer who established the first steel mill in France
- James Jackson (physician) (1777–1867), Massachusetts physician
- James Hayter Jackson (1800–1877), New Zealand mariner, whaler and trader
- James U. Jackson (1856–1925), founder and developer of the city of North Augusta, South Carolina
- James Ranalph Jackson (1882–1975), Australian painter
- Onision, American YouTuber

== See also ==
- Jim Jackson (disambiguation)
- Jamie Jackson (disambiguation)
