= Jamie Jackson =

Jamie Jackson may refer to:

- Jamie Jackson (footballer) (born 1986), English footballer, currently playing for Buxton
- Jamie Jackson (actor) (born 1970), Australian actor
- Jamie Jackson (Colorado politician), American politician

== See also ==
- James Jackson (disambiguation)
