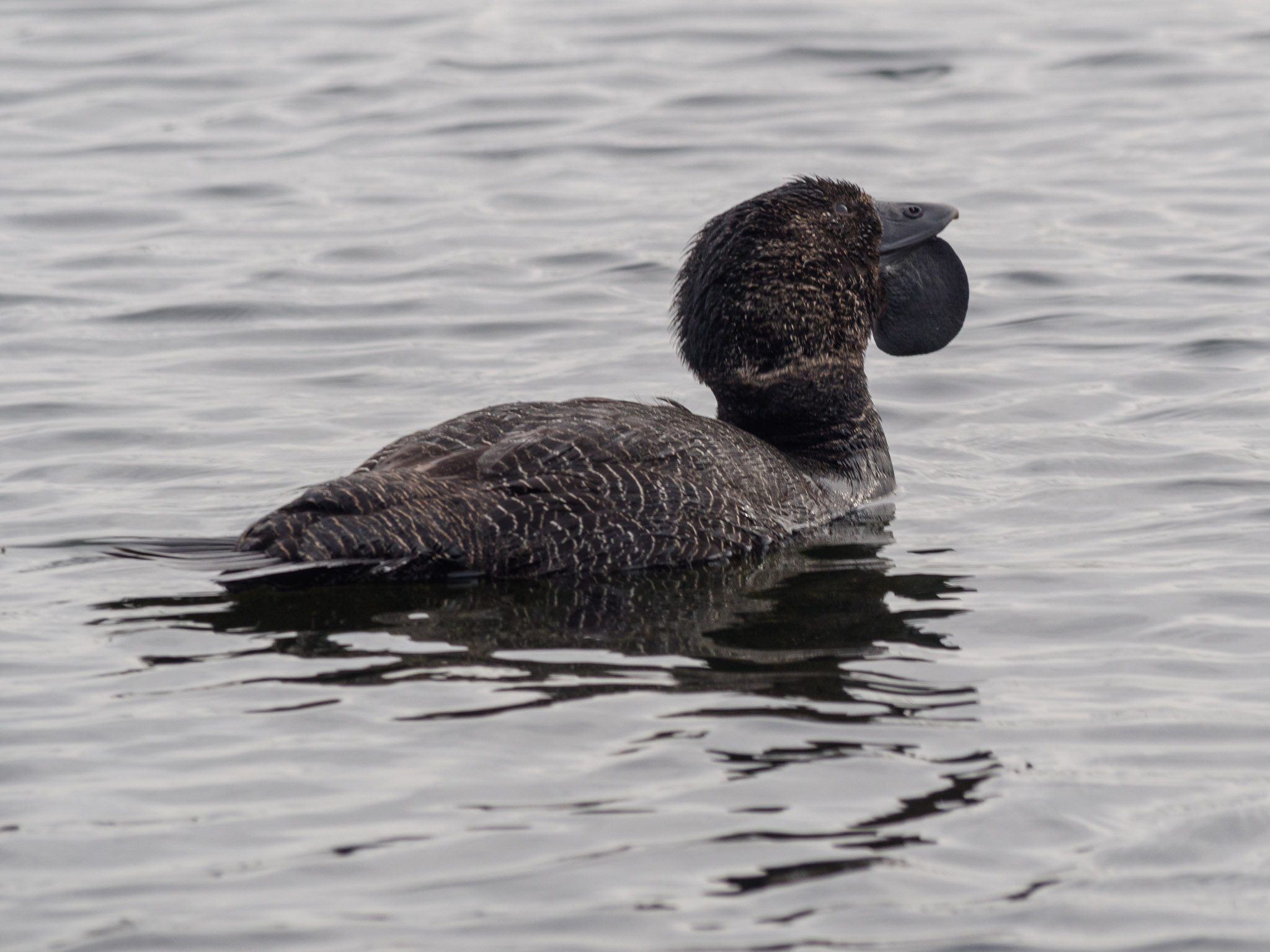
- Male during breeding season
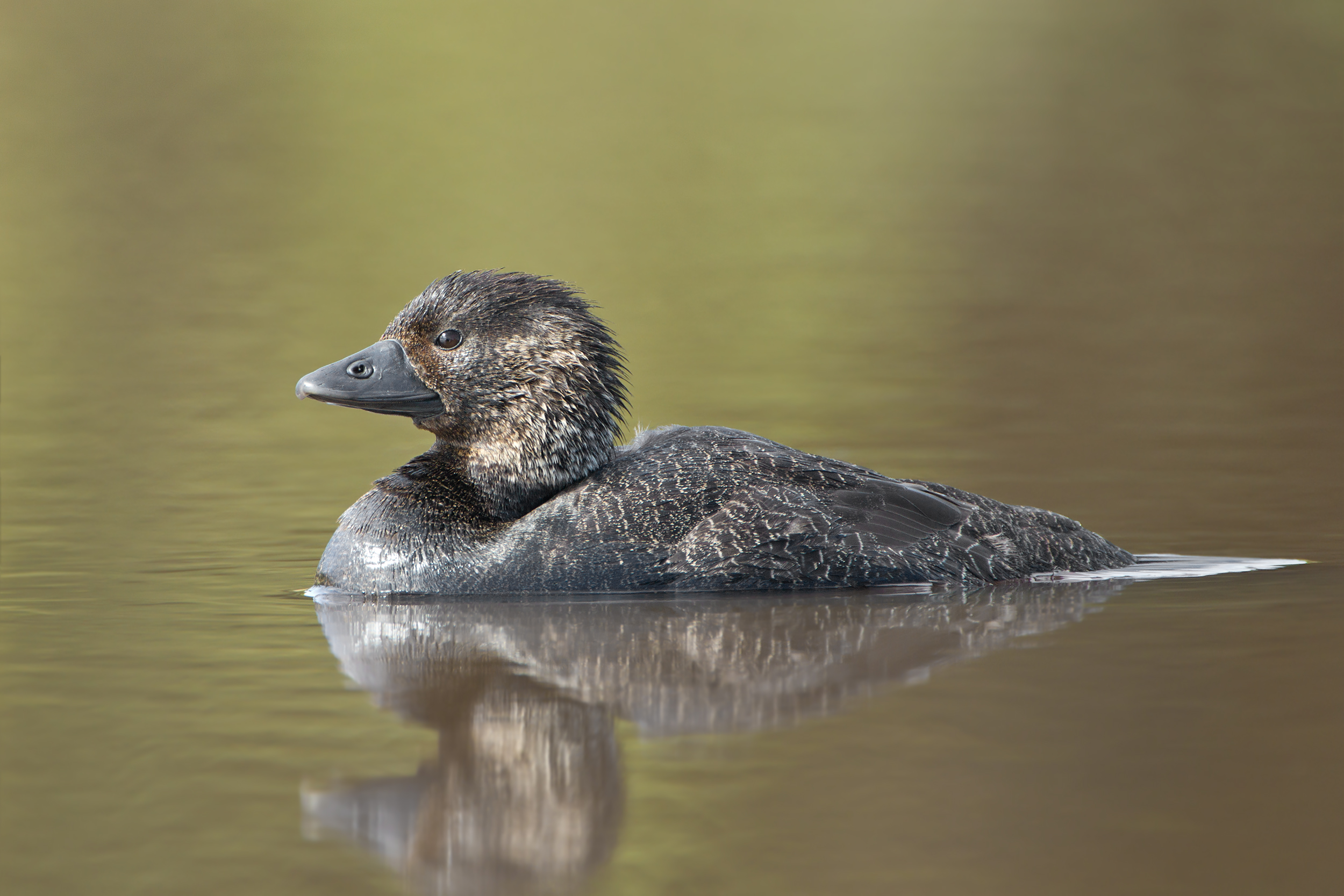
- Female

Conservation status
- Least Concern (IUCN 3.1)

Scientific classification
- Kingdom: Animalia
- Phylum: Chordata
- Class: Aves
- Order: Anseriformes
- Family: Anatidae
- Genus: Biziura
- Species: B. lobata

Binomial name
- Biziura lobata (Shaw, 1796)
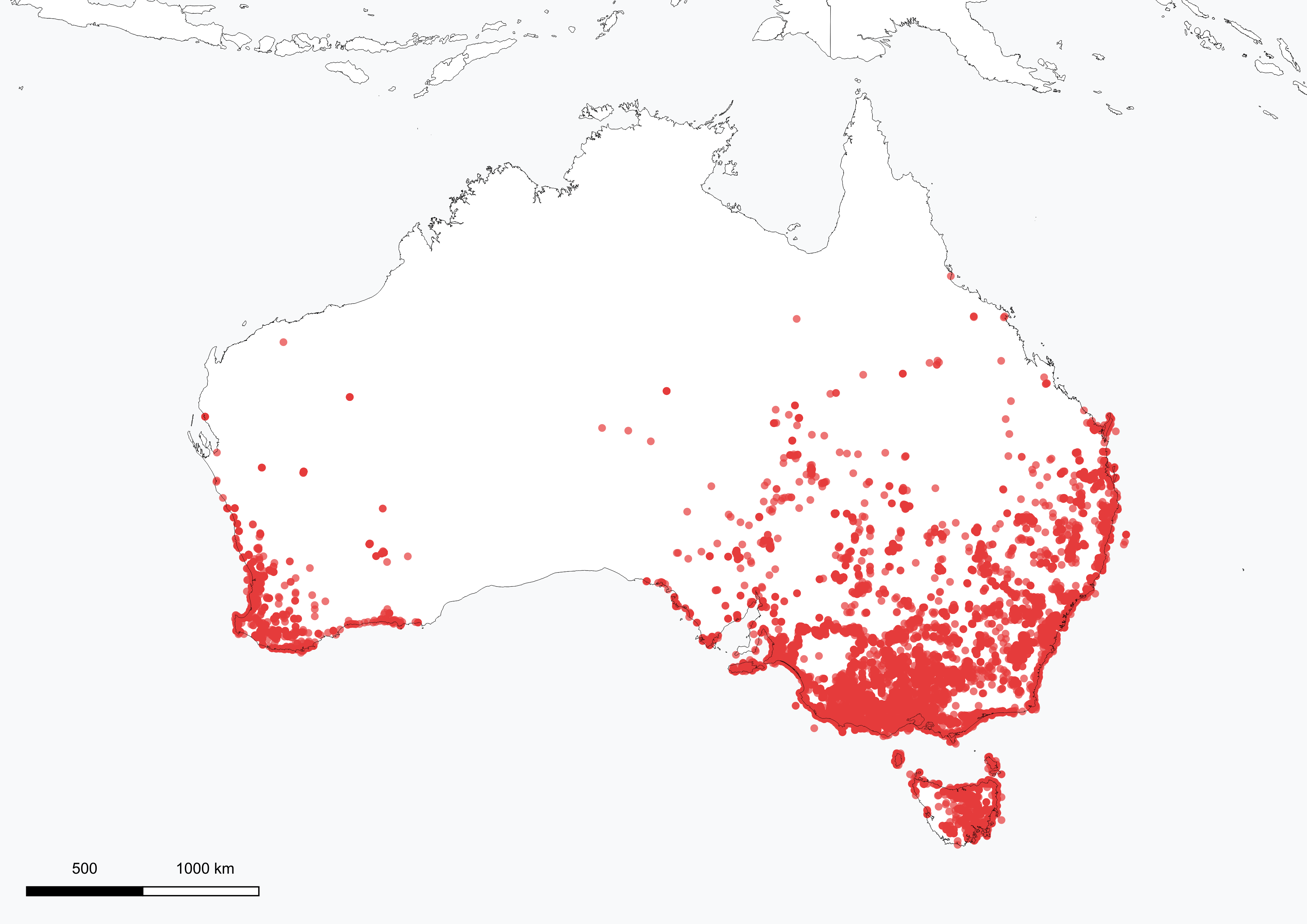
- Species distribution

= Musk duck =

Species of bird

The musk duck (Biziura lobata) is a highly aquatic, stiff-tailed duck native to southern Australia. It is the only living member of the genus Biziura. An extinct relative, the New Zealand musk duck or de Lautour's duck (B. delautouri), once occurred on New Zealand, but is only known from prehistoric subfossil bones. It was about 8% longer than the living species, with a particularly large head.

This animal derives its common name from the peculiar musky odour it emanates during the breeding season. Musk ducks are moderately common through the Murray-Darling and Cooper Creek basins, and in the wetter, fertile areas in the south of the continent: the southwest corner of Western Australia, Victoria, and Tasmania.

== Description ==
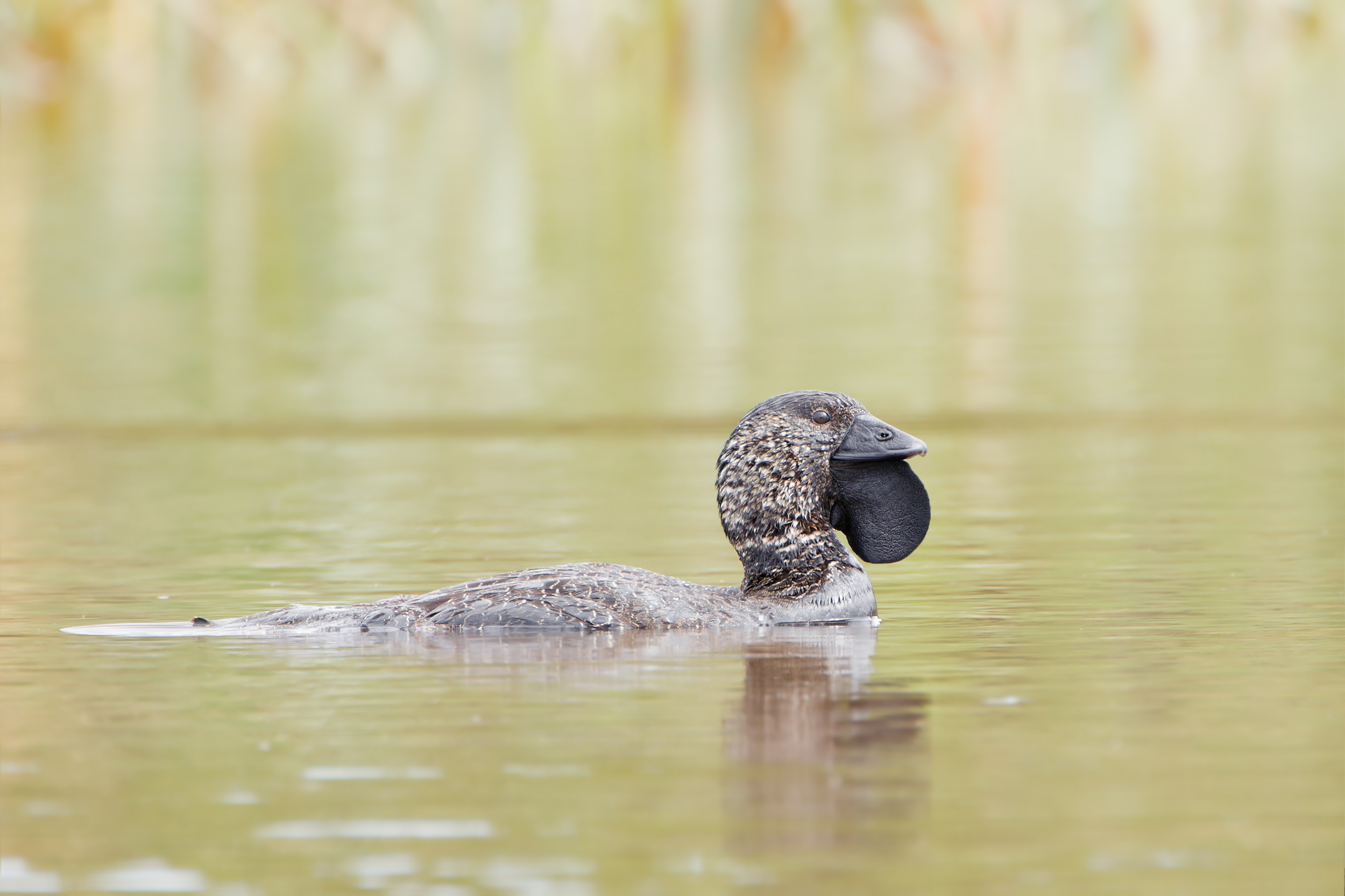
Male displaying the large bill lobe that appears during breeding season, Sandford, Tasmania, Australia

Adult males are 60 to 70 cm (24 to 28 in) long and have a distinctive large, leathery lobe underneath the bill; females are 47 to 55 cm (19 to 22 in) long and unadorned. Their drab dark grey-brown, slightly pin-striped plumage is inconspicuous and does not differ between the sexes. This species weighs an average of 2,398 g (5.287 lb) in males and 1,551 g (3.419 lb) in females, with the smallest females weighing only 993 g (2.189 lb) and the largest males weighing up to 3,170 g (6.99 lb). On average, they are the second-heaviest diving duck in the world after the common eider, with male musk ducks actually being slightly heavier than male common eiders, but female eiders being rather larger than female musk ducks due to that species' lesser size sexual dimorphism. Musk ducks float very low in the water, almost like a cormorant, and the large, webbed feet are well back on the body. The ducklings are covered in dark brown down.

In its native range, the fanned tail is distinctive, allowing to distinguish this species from the freckled duck (Stictonetta naevosa) which has similar size, colouration, and habits. The blue-billed duck (Oxyura australis) has a similarly shaped tail, but the main colour of its males in breeding plumage is a much richer chestnut brown. Females and males in nonbreeding plumage are very similar, however, and if one is not intimately familiar with the slight differences in behaviour, they cannot be told apart from female musk ducks at a distance. Male musk ducks in the breeding season are usually unmistakable due to the large bill lobe.

== Systematics ==
The relationships of this peculiar species are quite enigmatic. It is traditionally included with the stiff-tailed duck subfamily Oxyurinae, but appears to be only distantly related to the genus Oxyura, and its peculiar apomorphies make it difficult to place. Its relationship with the equally strange pink-eared ducks (Malacorhynchus) is unresolved, but seems to be quite close, and it seems to be part of an ancient Gondwanan radiation of Anatidae. As such, it is fairly closely related to the stiff-tailed ducks proper, but it seems not quite as closely related as formerly believed, with many similarities due to convergent evolution.

== Ecology and status ==
Adult male with large bill lobe preening. Storm King Dam, southern Queensland, Australia

This species prefers deep, still lakes and wetlands with areas of both open water and reed beds. They seldom emerge from the water and are awkward on dry land. They rarely fly: take off is made with difficulty, and landing is a clumsy, low-angled affair with no attempt to lower the feet. However, at need musk ducks fly swiftly and for long distances, with rapid, shallow wing beats.

In the water, musk ducks display an effortless agility, twisting and turning on the surface with both feet and tail. In general, musk ducks remain in the water all day long, alternately loafing and feeding energetically, though they sometimes emerge to sit on a log or on dry land for a while. They stay on the water at night, sleeping well out from land with the head tucked into the body or under a wing.

Musk ducks are very much at home below the surface, slipping under head-first with barely a ripple, and staying submerged for as long as a minute at a time, often resurfacing only for a few moments before diving again. They dive to escape predators or unwanted company, and to search for food, typically in fairly deep water. They can descend to at least 6 m (about 20 ft). The primary diet items are water beetles, yabbies, freshwater snails and shellfish, and the like, supplemented with a variety of aquatic plants and a few fish.

When not breeding, adults are generally solitary. Adult males hold and defend territories, excluding other males and quite often females, too. Younger birds – juveniles and unmated adults – form flocks on larger bodies of water at some times of year. It is not known at what age they reach sexual maturity in the wild, but it may take several years. They are a long-lived species and are still capable of breeding when 20 years old or more.

=== Reproduction ===
The musk duck breeding season varies with rainfall and water levels, but is typically between July and January, with the greatest number of clutches laid in September or October, the austral spring. Despite a number of more general studies, little is known about musk duck breeding. During breeding season, they give off the musky odour from which the species derives its common name. Also, in the season males advertise themselves loudly with a repetitive sequence of sounds: first, a ker-plonk splash made with the feet on the surface of the water; then two soft, sharp cuc cuc calls; then a loud whistle and a deep grunt. This sequence can be started at any time of day or night, with or without an associated visual display, and repeated every 4 or 5 seconds for as long as half an hour at a time. Although male musk ducks have a large leathery lobe below the bill and this swells during the breeding season, it is not connected to the vocal cavities and appears to be purely for visual purposes.

Mating is thought to be promiscuous, quite possibly on a lek system like that of the kākāpō (a very large, flightless parrot found only in New Zealand), but this remains uncertain. The male plays no part in building the nest or raising the young.

Females select a secluded location for nesting, usually in tall reeds well away from land and protected by deep water, or under the cover of overhanging shrubbery, but sometimes in a range of innovative places, such as on a stump, in a hollow log, or even under an upturned boat. The nest is a simple platform of trampled plant material with a slight cup, lined with fine plant matter and, after the eggs are laid, plenty of down. She seems to be unable to carry nest material and must rely on whatever is within reach. With the nest complete, she pulls reeds down from overhead to make a canopy, hiding it from view. When leaving the nest to feed, she slips quietly into the water and submerges, not surfacing until she is well away from it.

Clutch size is unknown: as many as 10 eggs have been counted in a nest, but it seems likely that this is the result of dump nesting: three or four eggs are considered more likely. In most cases, only one duckling survives, sometimes two. They are able to swim and dive within a few days, after which they probably leave the nest. Young stay close to the mother for several months at least, sometimes riding on her back to begin with. They can peck at food items on the surface and dive a little while still quite small, but the mother continues to provide the bulk of their food until they are almost full-grown.

=== Conservation status ===
Musk ducks are sometimes shot by hunters, but are little prized, not being considered good eating. Wholesale clearing and draining of wetlands has impacted on their numbers, as has the widespread rise in Australian water salinity levels, but the species is not presently considered to be in danger.

=== 1987 speech mimicry tape rediscovered ===
In September 2021, reports circulated about a rediscovered tape that originally was recorded in 1987 of a musk duck named Ripper at Tidbinbilla Nature Reserve in the Australian Capital Territory, who appeared to be the first duck recorded to mimic human speech. Reportedly, the recording demonstrates the duck saying "you bloody fool", possibly repeating a catchphrase from one of the caretakers of the reserve. Although other bird species are capable of mimicking human speech, no other duck species is reported to have that capability.

== Subspecies ==
The musk duck has two recognized subspecies. Biziura lobata menziesi, commonly referred to as the eastern musk duck, has a range from South Australia extending to the southern reaches of Queensland, through most of New South Wales and Victoria, and finally reaching as far south as Tasmania. The other subspecies is Biziura lobata lobata, commonly referred to as the western musk duck. Its range is the south-west of Western Australia.
