= Ron Scarlett =

New Zealand paleozoologist (1911–2002)

Ron Scarlett MBE
- Born: Ronald Jack Scarlett; 22 March 1911; Stoke, New Zealand
- Died: 9 July 2002 (aged 91); Christchurch, New Zealand
- Scientific career
- Fields: Paleozoology
- Institutions: Canterbury Museum

Ronald Jack Scarlett MBE (22 March 1911 – 9 July 2002) was a New Zealand paleozoologist.

== Early life and family ==
Scarlett was born at Stoke, near Nelson, on 22 March 1911 to Walter Andrew Scarlett and Lilian Elsie (née Cresswell). He was the oldest child of four brothers and four sisters. His father was an impoverished sawyer and so the family was forced to move around the upper South Island to find work in sawmills. Ron Scarlett attended six primary schools until he began to work at age 14. He had jobs on farms, in a sawmill, as a labourer, as golf greenkeeper, as gardener, as goldminer and later as trucker for a coalmine. During World War II, he spent some time as a conscientious objector in the Hanmer Springs Conscientious Objectors camp.

== Scientific career ==
After he joined the staff of the Canterbury Museum in 1952 he became one of the most prolific osteologists of New Zealand. Scarlett became notable for his excavations over many decades on several paleontological deposits on New Zealand like Te Aute, Lake Poukawa, or the Pyramid Valley swamp where he unearthed and described the fossil remains of a Late Quaternary avifauna including bones of the Eyles' harrier (Circus eylesi), the New Zealand owlet-nightjar, the Scarlett's duck (which was named by Storrs L. Olson), and the Hodgens' waterhen. The Scarlett's shearwater (Puffinus spelaeus) described in 1994 by Richard N. Holdaway and Trevor H. Worthy is named in his honour too. Ron Scarlett belong to the founders of the New Zealand Archaeological Association which was established in 1954. He was also a member of the Ornithological Society of New Zealand where he has frequently written contributions for the quarterly scientific journal, Notornis.

== Other activities ==
Scarlett was a well-known stamp, coin and postcard collector. His extensive collections of New Zealand and Pacific Island postcards are now with the Canterbury Museum in Christchurch, including an extensive collection of postcards showing views of the Chatham Islands, which he had visited many times.

== Later life and death ==
In the 1996 New Year Honours, Scarlett was appointed a Member of the Order of the British Empire, for services to science. He died at the age of 91 on 9 July 2002 in a Christchurch hospital.

== Selected publications ==
- 1972 – Bones for the New Zealand Archaeologist
- 1979 – Birds of a Feather: Osteological and Archaeological Papers from the South Pacific in honour of R.J. Scarlett
- 1987 – Bird Species Present on the Southwest Coast of Chatham Island in the 16th Century AD
- 1990 – The Naval Good Shooting Medal, 1903–1914
- 1992 – Under Hazardous Circumstances: Register of Awards of Lloyd's War Medal for Bravery at Sea 1939-1945
