= New Zealand giant crake =

Conservation status
- Extinct (IUCN 3.1)

Scientific classification
- Kingdom: Animalia
- Phylum: Chordata
- Class: Aves
- Order: Gruiformes
- Family: Rallidae
- Genus: Porzana
- Species: †P. hodgenorum

Binomial name
- †Porzana hodgenorum (Scarlett, 1955)

Synonyms
- Rallus hodgeni Scarlett, 1955; Gallinula (Tribonyx) hodgeni (Scarlett, 1955); Gallinula (Tribonyx) hodgenorum (Scarlett, 1955)

Species of rail

The New Zealand giant crake or Hodgens’ Waterhen (Porzana hodgenorum) is an extinct rail species from New Zealand. Its name commemorates J. and R. Hodgen who were owners of the Pyramid Valley swamp where the holotype was discovered. It reached a weight of 280 g and its wings were so reduced that it was unable to fly. It occupied a wide range of habitats, including open forest and grassland along riverbanks.

== History ==
The species was first described by Ron Scarlett as Rallus hodgeni in 1955. Storrs L. Olson transferred it into the genus Gallinula, subgenus Tribonyx, in 1975 and changed its specific epithet to hodgenorum in 1986. It has since been thought to have been closely related to the black-tailed native-hen (Tribonyx ventralis) and the Tasmanian native-hen (Tribonyx mortierii), being placed in the same genus. In a 2025 analysis using a molecular phylogeny, it was found that the species is a member of the crake genus Porzana, with the analysis recovering it as sister to the Australian crake (Porzana fluminea).

It is only known from subfossil material of which the youngest Māori midden record is from the 18th century. Hundreds of bones have been unearthed at Pyramid Valley in the South Island, at Lake Poukawa in the North Island, and several other sites, indicating that it was once widespread in New Zealand except on the Chatham Islands. The main reasons for its extinction are likely to have been predation by the Pacific rat and hunting by human settlers.
