= Jim Eyles =

New Zealand archaeologist

James Roy Eyles OBE (10 January 1926 – 12 November 2004) was a New Zealand archaeologist.

== Biography ==
Born in Blenheim on 10 January 1926, Eyles was the son of Albert Roy Eyles and Daphne Eyles (née Daken). He spent his early years living with his family at the Wairau Bar near Blenheim where, in 1939 as a schoolboy, he discovered early human skeletons and associated artefacts including necklaces, stone tools and moa egg. Eyles discovered several more burials on the bar, and assisted with the excavations carried out by Roger Duff from the Canterbury Museum. The site is regarded as one of the oldest and most important archaeological sites in New Zealand.

Eyles continued his association with Duff during the excavations of Pyramid Valley Swamp in the 1940s. Duff recognised his contribution by naming an extinct hawk found in the swamp the Eyles' harrier.

In the 1991 Queen's Birthday Honours, Eyles was appointed an Officer of the Order of the British Empire, for services to archaeology.

A descendant of pioneer whaler Jimmy Jackson, Eyles worked at Canterbury, Hokitika and Nelson Museums, as well as in whaling and farming.
