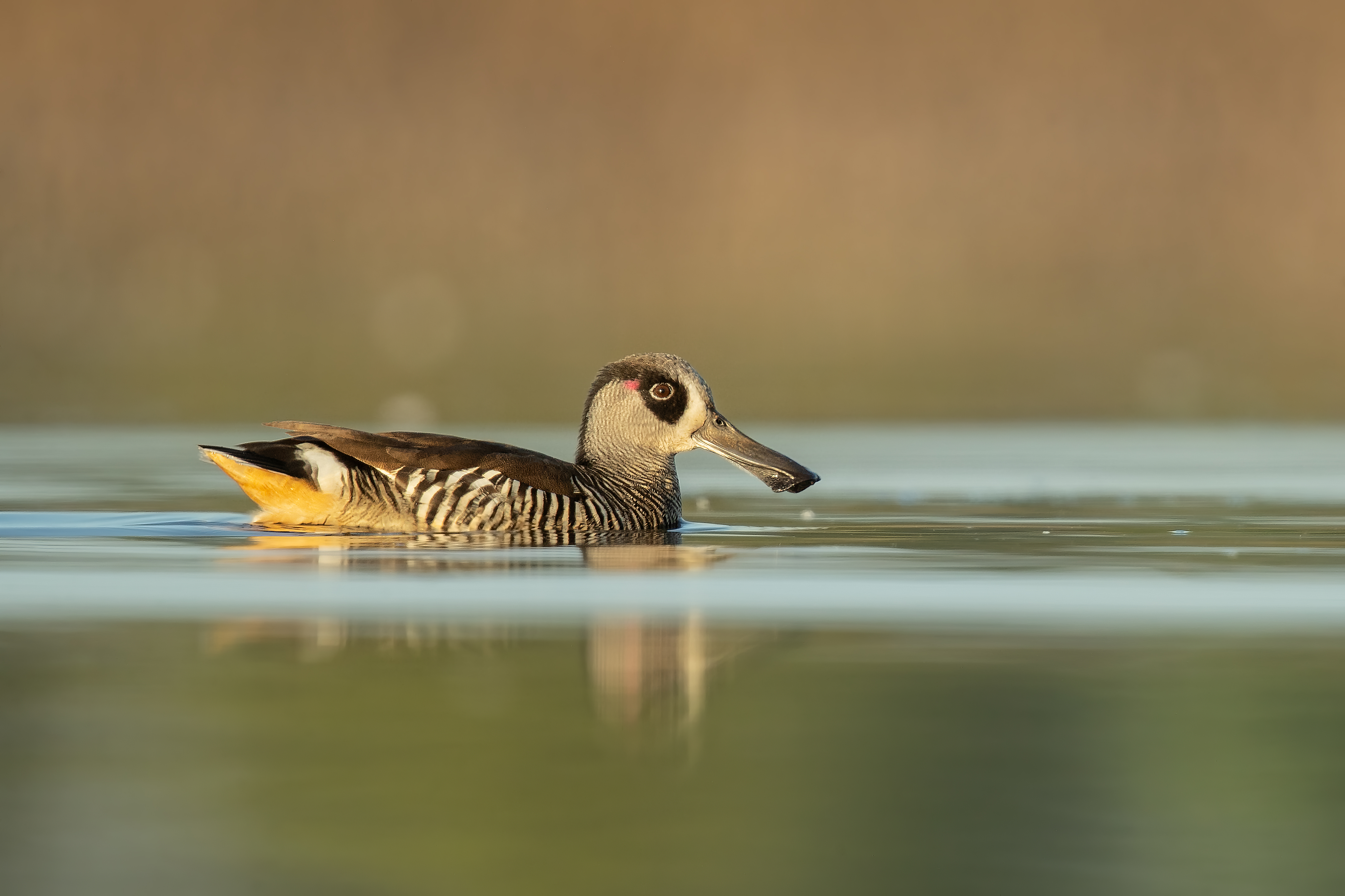

Conservation status
- Least Concern (IUCN 3.1)

Scientific classification
- Kingdom: Animalia
- Phylum: Chordata
- Class: Aves
- Order: Anseriformes
- Family: Anatidae
- Genus: Malacorhynchus
- Species: M. membranaceus

Binomial name
- Malacorhynchus membranaceus (Latham, 1801)
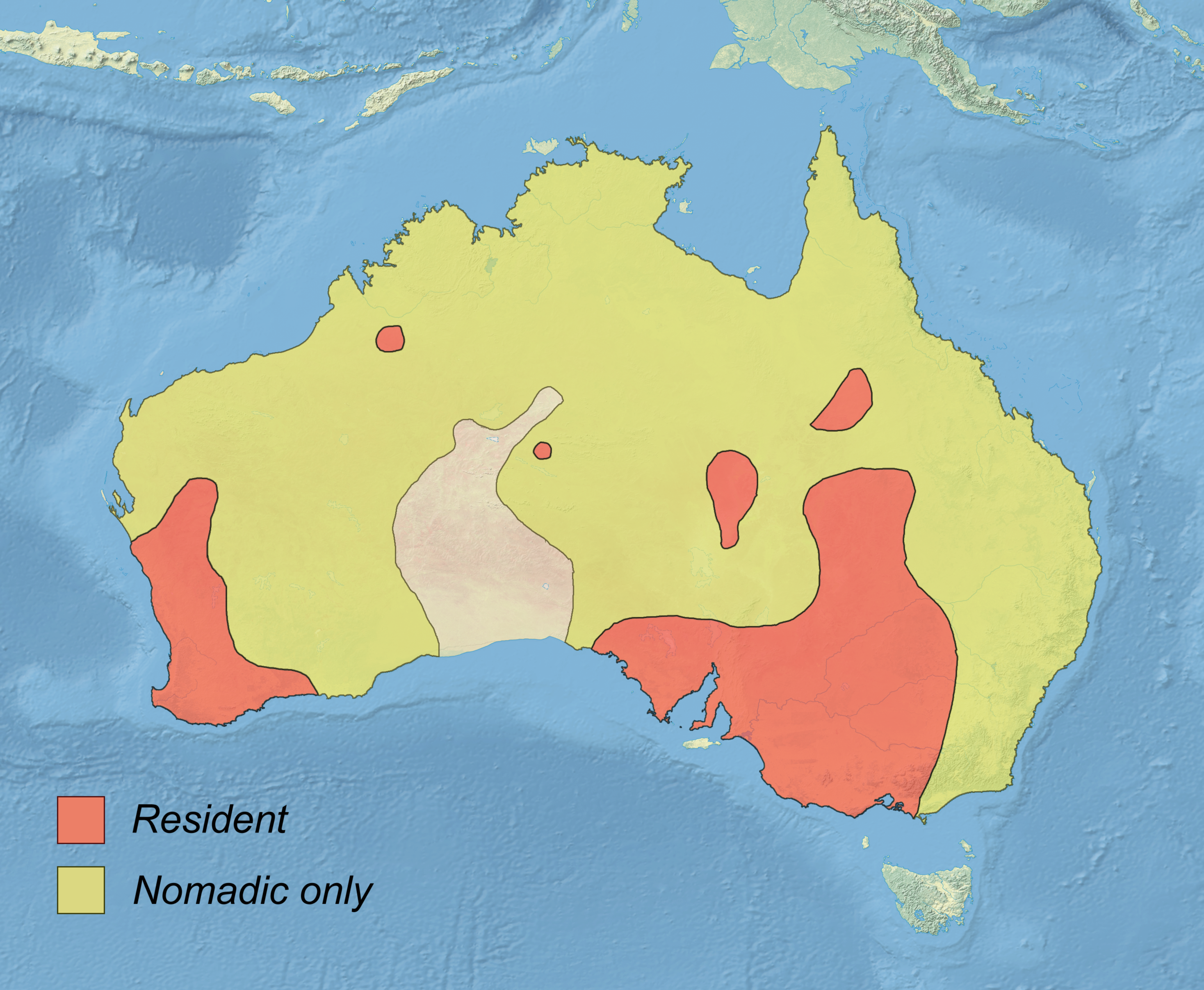
- Distribution map of the pink-eared duck

= Pink-eared duck =

Species of bird

The pink-eared duck (Malacorhynchus membranaceus) is a species of duck found in Australia.

== Description ==
The pink-eared duck has a large spatulate bill like the Australasian shoveler, but is smaller at 38–40 cm length. Its brown back and crown, black and white barred sides and black eye patches on its otherwise white face make this bird unmistakable. Juveniles are slightly duller, but otherwise all plumages are similar. Its vernacular name refers to a pink spot in the corner formed by the black head pattern; it is only noticeable at close distance however, making the origin of the seldom-used Australian name of zebra duck more readily apparent.

== Taxonomy and systematics ==
The pink-eared duck was first described by the English ornithologist John Latham in 1801 under the binomial name Anas membranacea. It is the only living member of the genus Malacorhynchus; a closely related, but slightly larger extinct form from New Zealand was described as Scarlett's duck (Malacorhynchus scarletti). This peculiar duck may be most closely related to the shelducks but its relationships are enigmatic. It may be closer to the musk duck and the stiff-tails and, formerly placed in the paraphyletic "perching ducks"; it is in any case not close to the dabbling ducks.

This species is the only member of the order Anseriformes known to have carotenoid pigments in its feathers, in the characteristic pink "ear" spot.

The pink-eared duck was reportedly known as the New Holland duck by early colonists in Western Australia.

== Distribution ==
Widely distributed throughout Australia and highly mobile, these ducks can appear anywhere there is standing water, especially in dry inland regions, where annual rainfall rarely exceeds 15 in (380 mm).

== Food ==
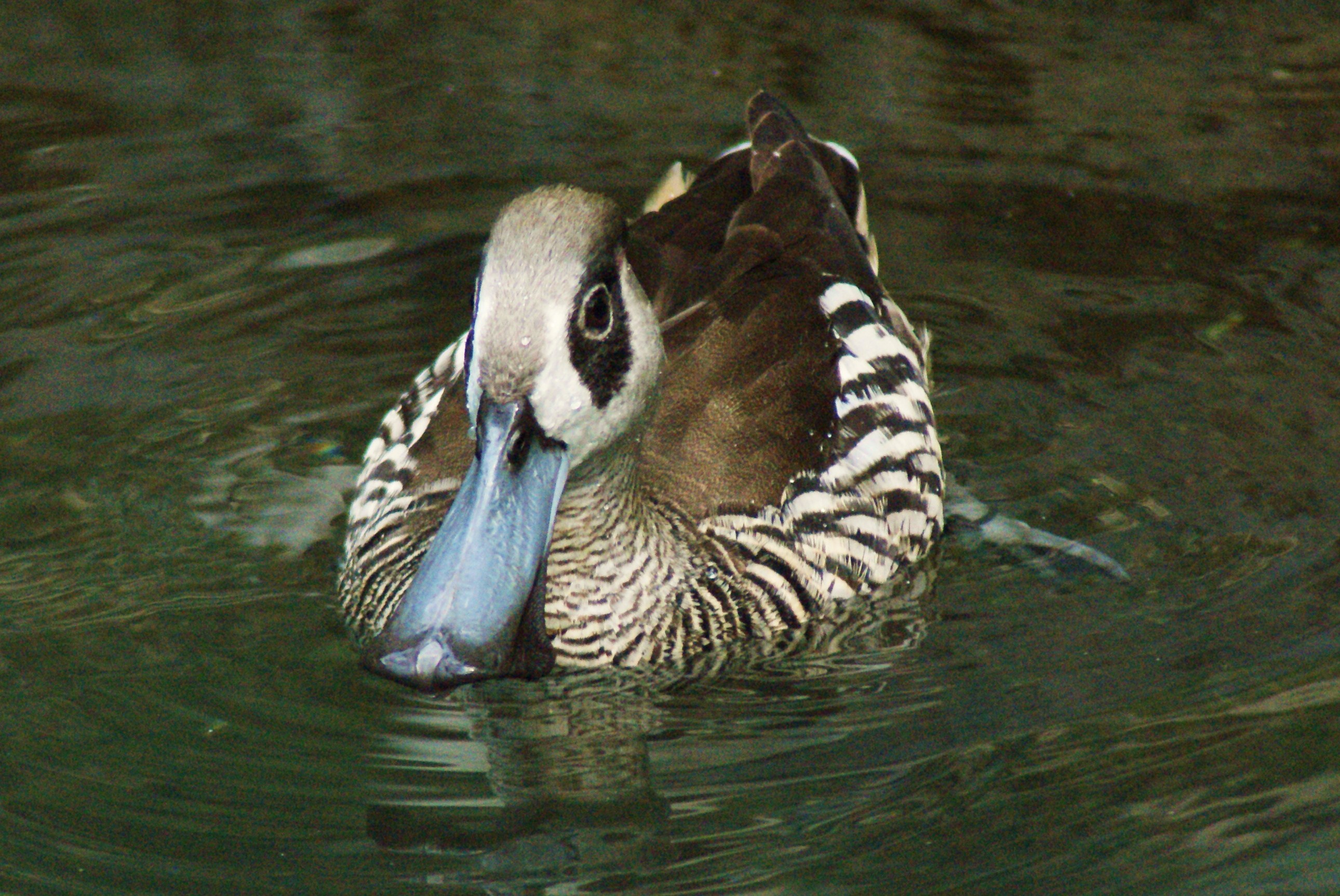
At Central Park Zoo, New York, United States

They are dependent on plankton, as well as crustaceans, mollusks and insects. Their bill is well designed for straining minute organisms, with pliable mandibular flaps that channel water in a manner that allow the ducks to filter algae and other plankton efficiently. They also feed by vortexing, in which two ducks spin about a central point with the head of one opposite the tail of the other, concentrating food in a gyrating water column.

== Breeding ==
Nesting is stimulated by the drying and filling of pools that promote increased levels of organic material. In good years, large numbers of pink-eared ducks concentrate in shallow flood plains. However, when conditions do not meet specifications, reproduction may be completely curtailed.

== Relationship with humans ==
The pink-eared duck is hunted in all regions in Australia except Tasmania. According to Australian studies, duck hunting with shotguns causes injuries. An X-ray study of ducks caught using nets in Victoria found that between 6% and 19% of all hunted ducks live with embedded shot pellets in their bodies. The activity is opposed by animal welfare groups who consider the practice to be unacceptably cruel.

== Gallery ==
Filter feeding flotilla, Burke River, Boulia.

Filter feeding flotilla, Burke River, Boulia.

Vortex feeding, Burke River, Boulia.
