= Pekapeka Regional Park =

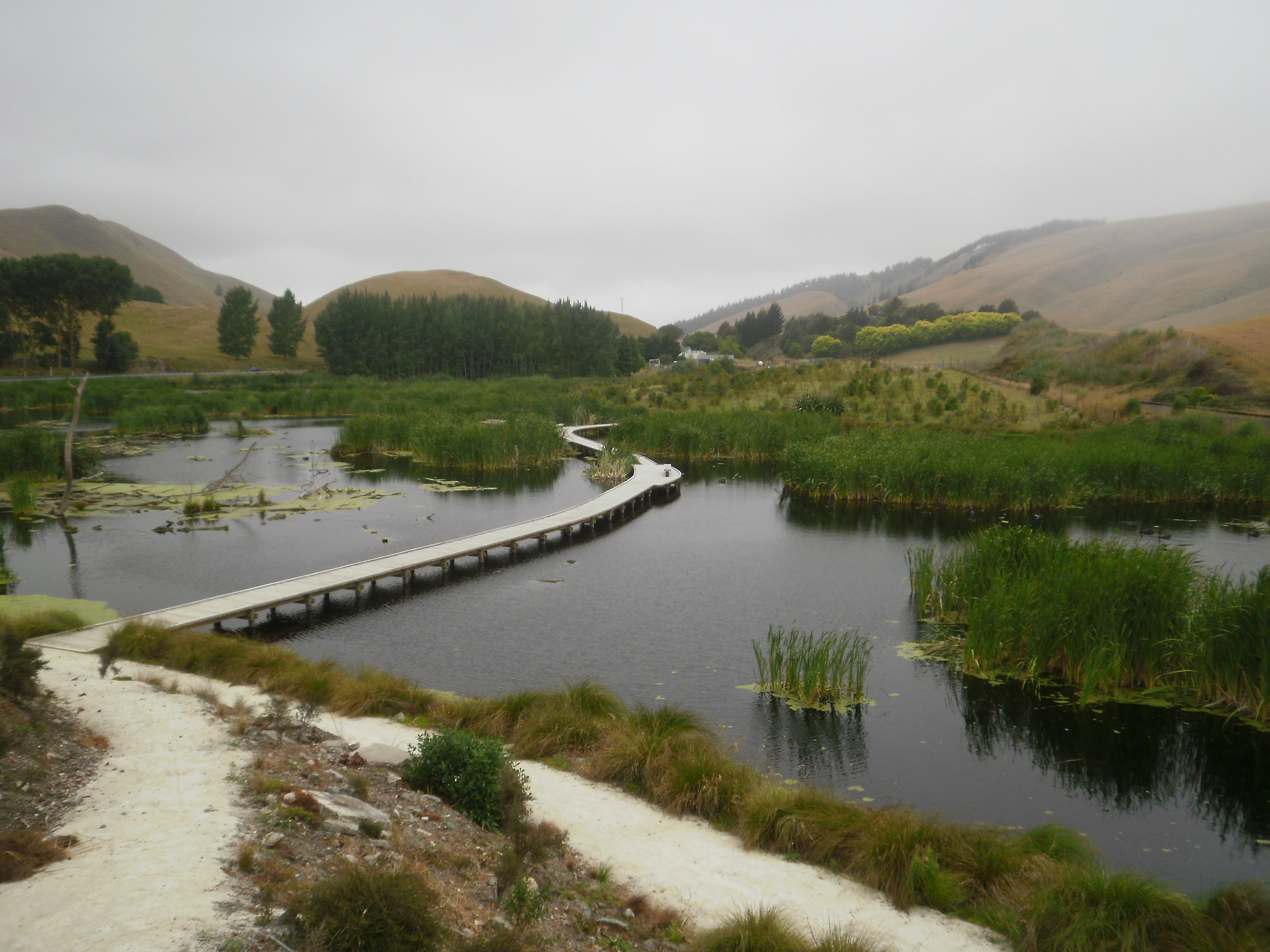
- Interactive map of Pekapeka Regional Park
- Location: Hastings, New Zealand
- Coordinates: 39.7209°S 176.7691°E
- Area: 98 hectares (240 acres)
- Operator: Hawke's Bay Regional Council

Pekapeka Regional Park, also known as Pekapeka Wetland, is a wetland reserve located 12 kilometres by road south of Hastings in the Poukawa Basin of Hawke's Bay, New Zealand.

The Hawke's Bay Regional Council began restoring the wetland in the late 1990s with the removal of willows and the construction of a perimeter fence. The Council initially owned about half of the wetland, but this has been increased to 90%. It is rated as the second most ecologically valuable wetland in Hawke's Bay. The Poukawa Stream, which drains Lake Poukawa in the south-west, runs through the Pekapeka Wetland.
