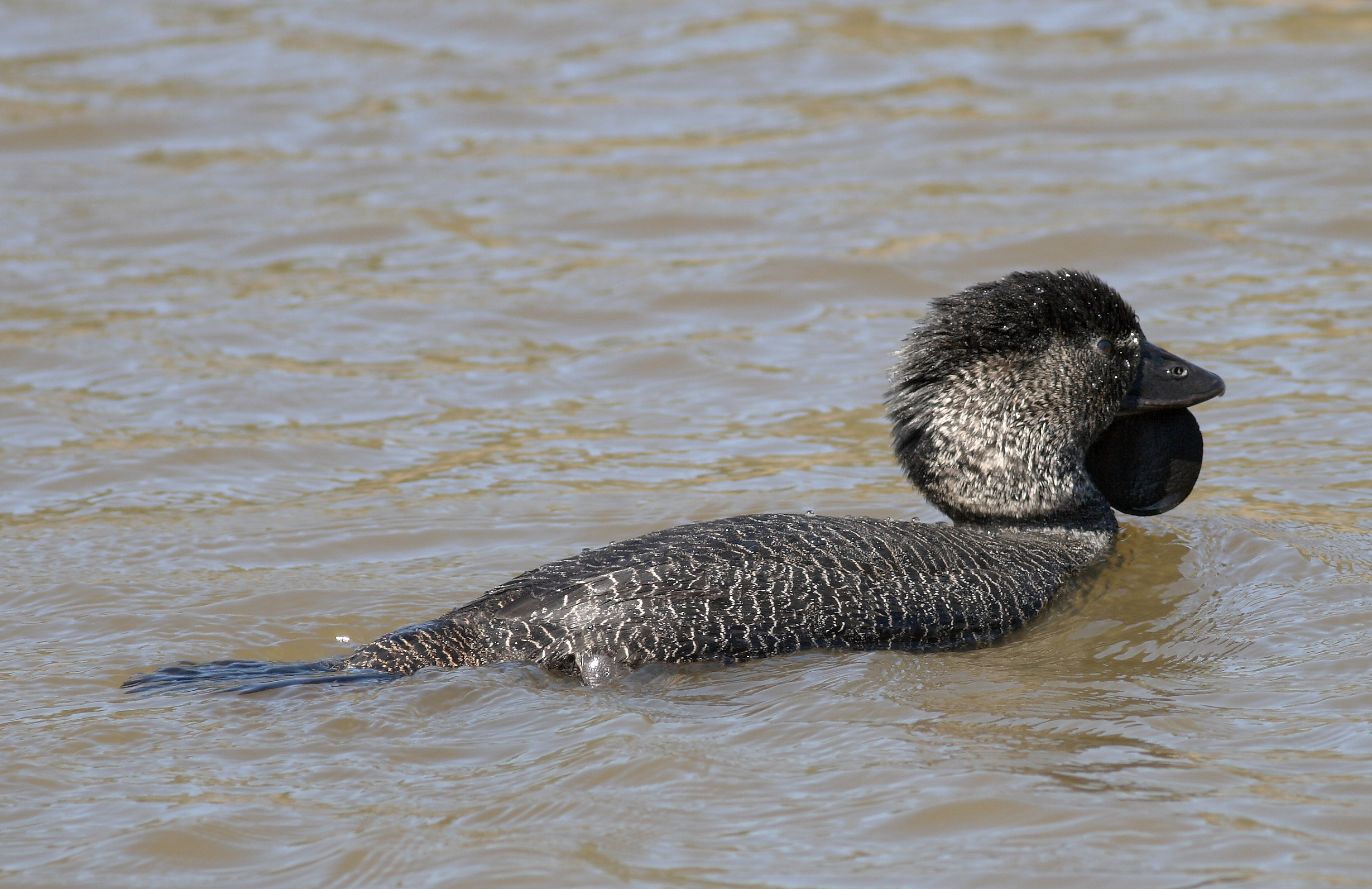
- Australian musk duck, Biziura lobata

Scientific classification
- Kingdom: Animalia
- Phylum: Chordata
- Class: Aves
- Order: Anseriformes
- Family: Anatidae
- Subfamily: Anatinae
- Genus: Biziura; Stephens, 1824

Species
- See text

= Biziura =

Genus of birds

Biziura is a genus of stiff-tailed ducks endemic to Australasia and containing one living and one subfossil species.

== Species ==
Image	Scientific name	Common name	Distribution
	B. lobata Stephens, 1824	musk duck	Widely distributed through south-eastern Australia, south-west Western Australia and the Murray-Darling Basin.
	†B. delautouri Forbes, 1892	New Zealand musk duck	previously endemic to New Zealand, and occurring on both North and South Islands, but now extinct.
