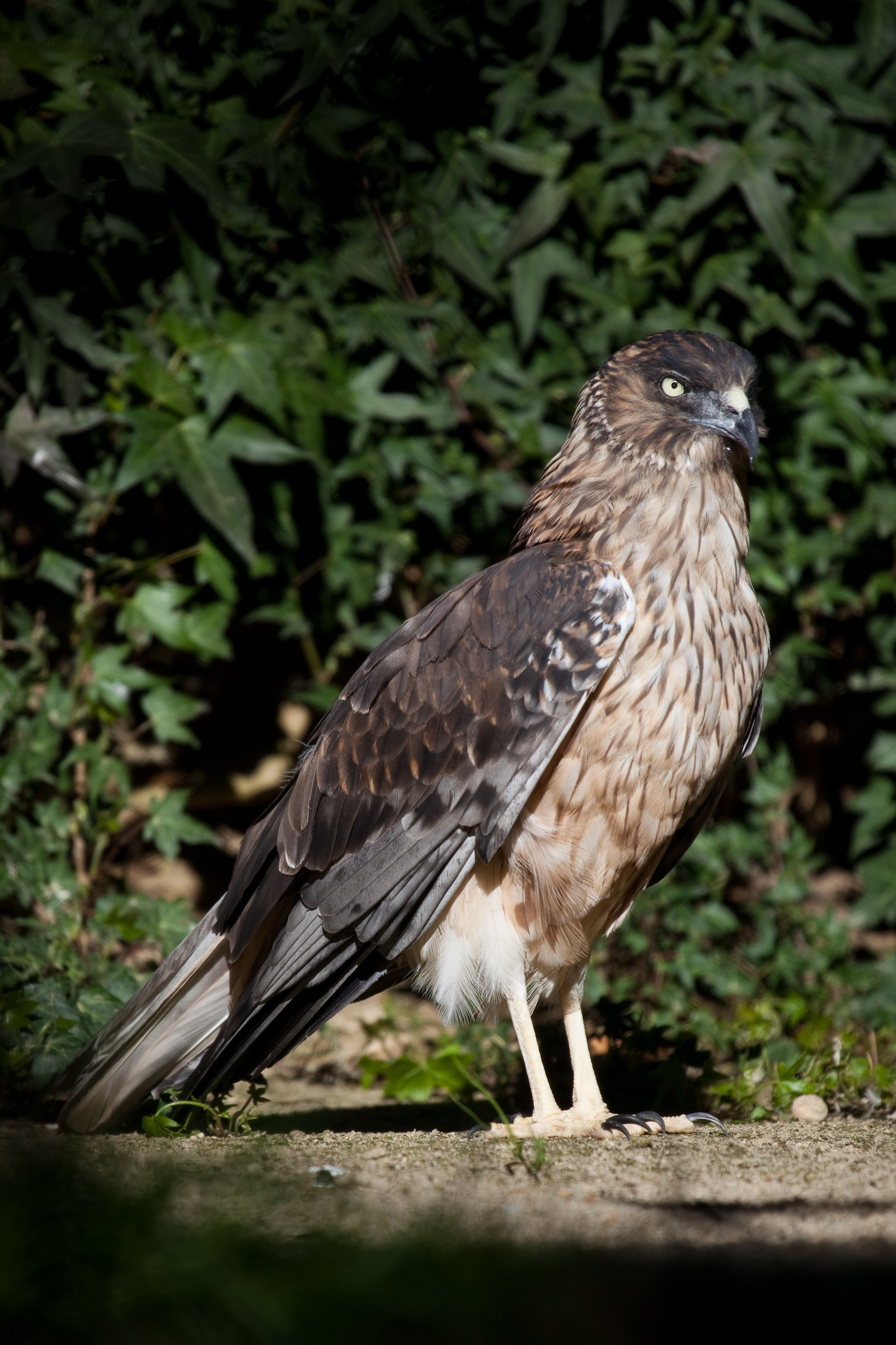
- Adult swamp harrier at Hamilton Zoo

Conservation status
- Least Concern (IUCN 3.1)

Scientific classification
- Kingdom: Animalia
- Phylum: Chordata
- Class: Aves
- Order: Accipitriformes
- Family: Accipitridae
- Genus: Circus
- Species: C. approximans

Binomial name
- Circus approximans Peale, 1849
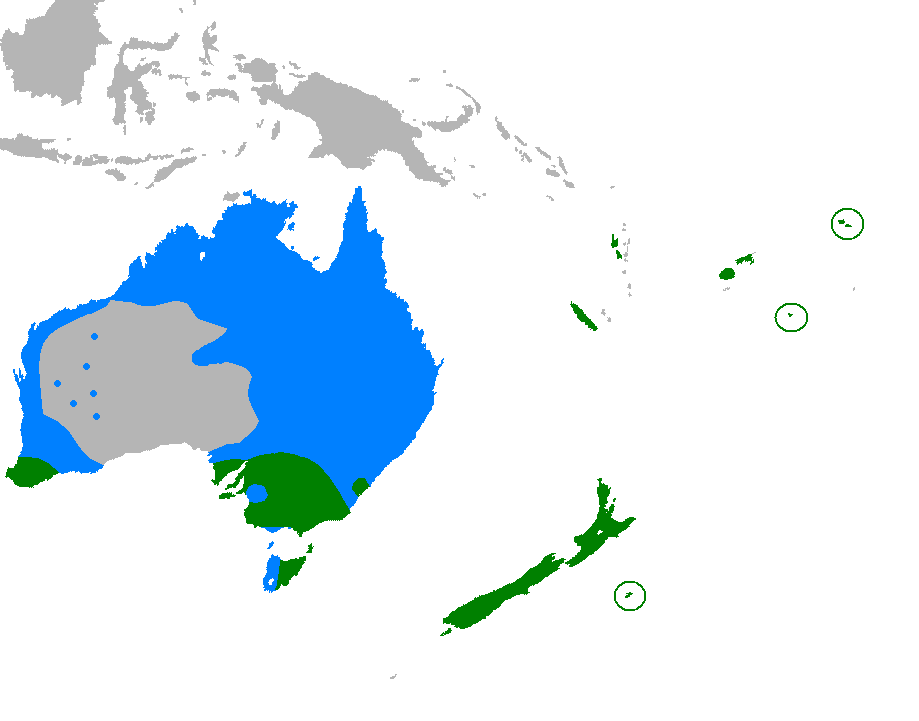

= Swamp harrier =

Species of bird

The swamp harrier (Circus approximans), also known as the Australasian marsh harrier or Australasian harrier, is a large, slim bird of prey widely distributed across Australasia. In New Zealand, it is also known by the Māori name kāhu. It arrived in New Zealand within the last 700 years, replacing the larger species, the extinct New Zealand endemic Eyles's harrier.

The swamp harrier belongs to the subfamily Circinae and genus Circus, which are represented worldwide, except Antarctica. The subfamily and genus are derived from the characteristic behaviour of circling flight during courtship and hawking.

== Description ==
The swamp harrier is largely dark brown, becoming lighter with age, and has a distinct white rump. It hunts by flying slowly, low to the ground, on upswept wings. The body length is 48 to 62 cm (19 to 24.5 in), and the wingspan is 118 to 145 cm (3 ft 10 in to 4 ft 9 in). The recorded weights of adults range from 580 to 1,100 g (1.28 to 2.43 lb). Females are significantly larger than the males. In New Zealand, 54 males averaged 640 g (1.41 lb) and 66 females averaged 870 g (1.92 lb). Going on mean weights and linear measurements, the swamp harrier may be by a slight margin the largest extant species of harrier but it is only marginally larger than some other species, like the marsh harriers and the Réunion harrier.

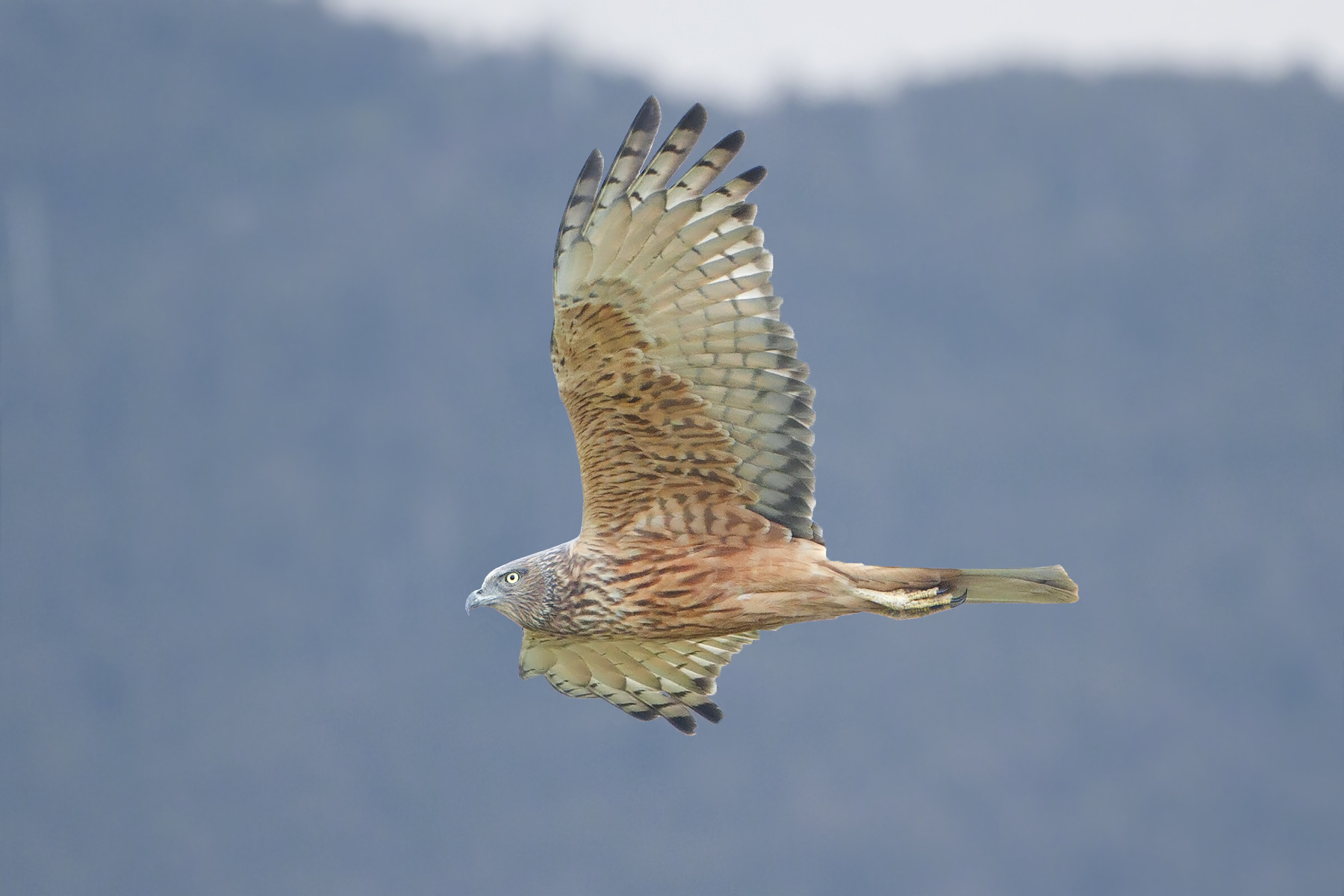
Adult male soaring in flight

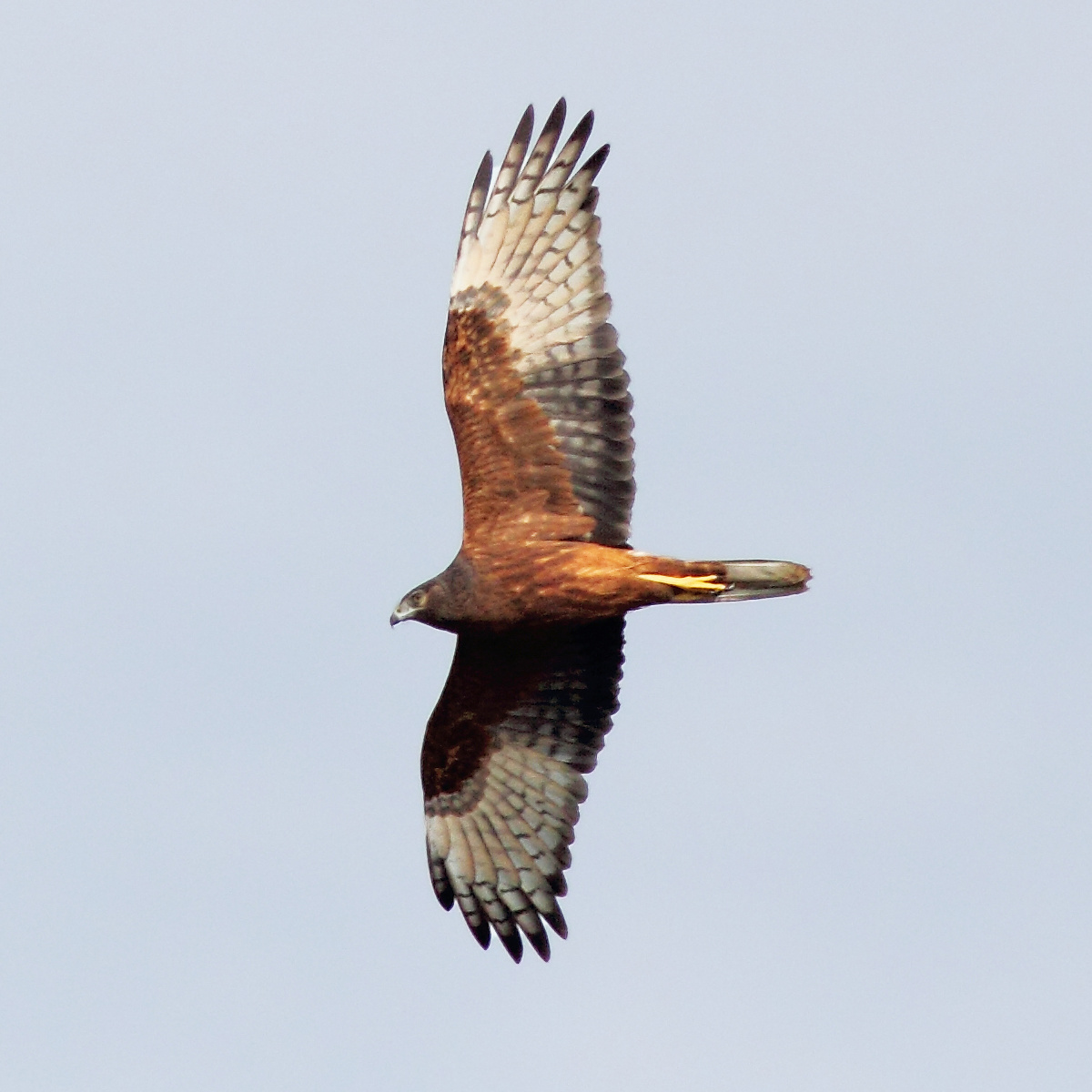
Immature flying in Victoria, Australia

== Distribution and habitat ==
The swamp harrier is widespread through Australasia and many islands in the south-west Pacific region, including much of Australia (except the arid region), New Zealand (where it is common in open country), Fiji, Vanuatu, New Caledonia and as stragglers on some subantarctic islands. It is usually found in wetlands and well-watered open country.

The swamp harrier probably only became established in New Zealand within the last 800 years, after lowland forests were extensively cleared by the first Polynesian settlers. It is absent from the fossil record. According to archaeological and genetic research, humans arrived in New Zealand no earlier than about 1280, with at least the main settlement period between about 1320 and 1350, consistent with evidence based on genealogical traditions. The Eyles's harrier (Circus teauteensis), a larger harrier species endemic to New Zealand, became extinct after human settlement. All swamp harrier remains from New Zealand that have been studied in detail are some 1000 years old at most, meaning that they post-date human settlement. There is no evidence for widespread coexistence of swamp and Eyles's harriers in New Zealand. Apparently, despite their considerable differences, the two harriers were still ecologically similar enough to competitively exclude one another, and only when the endemic Eyles's harrier became extinct could the swamp harrier become established.

The swamp harrier has benefited from European settlement, and is now very common, especially in open farmland.

== Behaviour ==
Common enemies of harriers are Australian magpies, masked lapwings which dive bomb and European starlings which mob individuals. They have been known to kill the young of New Zealand falcons and have also been heavily blamed and persecuted for killing chickens, pheasants and ducklings. Swamp harriers are the only bird of prey used for falconry in New Zealand. The quarry is usually pūkeko and young rabbits.

=== Diet ===
The swamp harrier mainly feeds on ground birds and waterbirds, rabbits and other small mammals, reptiles, frogs, and fish. During the winter months harriers feed to a large extent on carrion, including roadkill, frequently falling victim to vehicles themselves.

=== Breeding ===
This species nests on the ground, often in wetlands, on a mound in reeds or other dense vegetation. In some districts they nest in fields of oats or barley. The clutch size may range from two to seven, but is usually three or four. The incubation period is 31 to 34 days, and is carried out by the female alone. Chicks are fed by both parents, are fully feathered by 28 days and fledging about 45 days after hatching.
