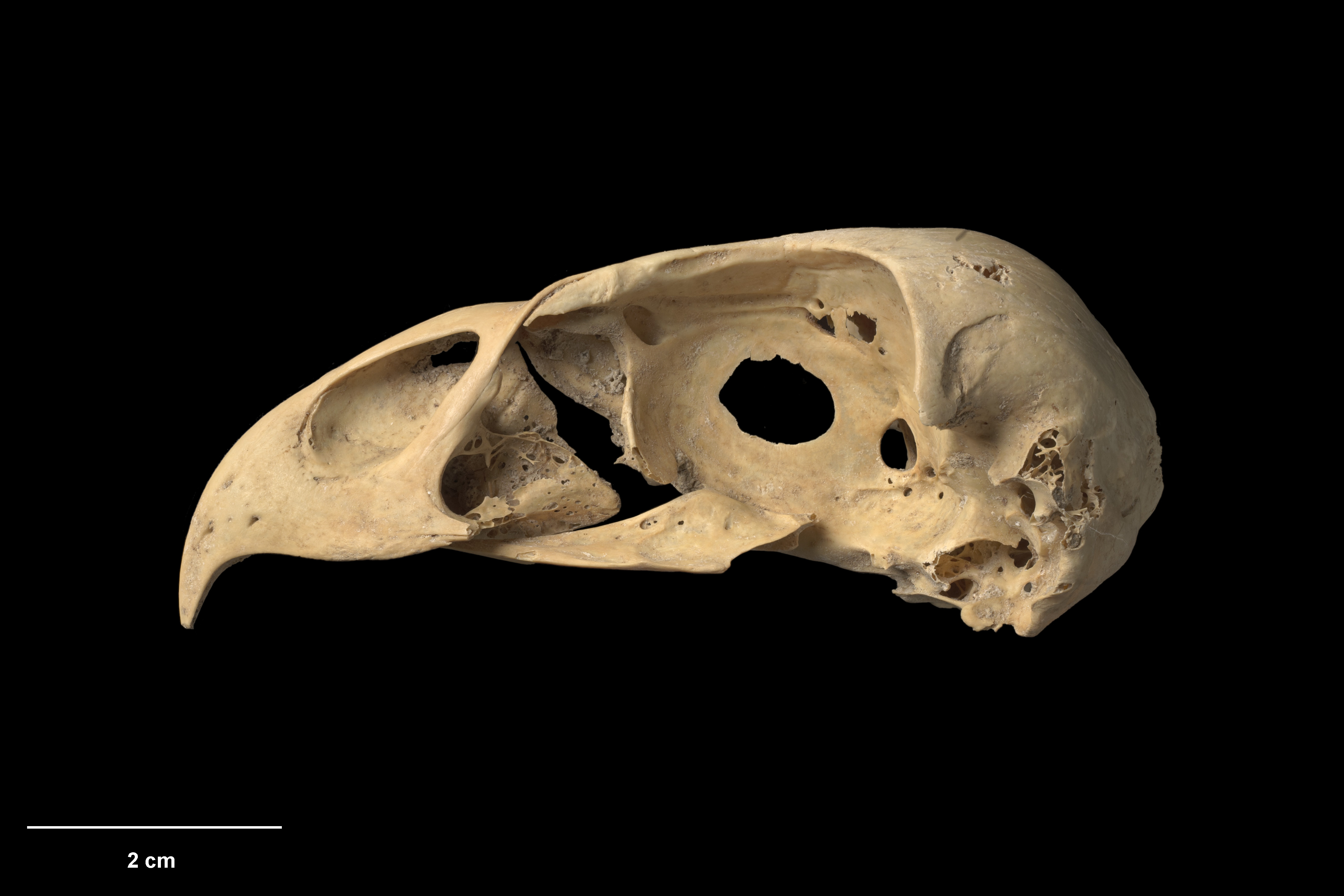
- Eyles's harrier skull held at Te Papa, Wellington

Conservation status
- Extinct (~1400s) (NZ TCS)

Scientific classification
- Kingdom: Animalia
- Phylum: Chordata
- Class: Aves
- Order: Accipitriformes
- Family: Accipitridae
- Genus: Circus
- Species: †C. teauteensis

Binomial name
- †Circus teauteensis Forbes, 1892

Synonyms
- Circus hamiltoni (nomen nudum); Circus eylesi (nomen nudum, but see text)

= Eyles's harrier =

Eyles's harrier Temporal range: Pleistocene-Holocene

Extinct species of bird

Eyles's harrier (Circus teauteensis; Māori: kērangi) is an extinct bird of prey that was endemic to New Zealand.

== Name ==
This species was named after Jim Eyles, paleontologist and former director of the Nelson Provincial Museum and the West Coast Museum.

== Description ==
It was an example of island gigantism, as an adult female weighed around 2.5 to 3 kg (5.5 to 6.6 lb), over twice as much as a swamp harrier. Its shape differed from that of most other harriers, and it was initially mistaken for a huge hawk, possibly a giant Accipiter.

== Ecology ==
It was a generalist predator, taking prey of the same size as small eagle species do: land animals weighing one or a few kilograms. In its hunting strategy, however, it was more adapted to avian prey, as aside from bats, mammals were entirely absent from New Zealand, apart from bats. Presumably, it hunted diurnal birds in a manner similar to goshawks.

== Taxonomy ==
Eyles' harrier was presumably somewhat similar to the living spotted harrier, its closest living relative, from which it diverged around 2.4 million years ago.

The nomenclature and taxonomy of C. teauteensis are quite convoluted. As Circus eylesi, it was only described in the mid-20th century, from remains found in Pyramid Valley in the South Island of New Zealand. However, essentially identical bones had been found about 100 years earlier by Augustus Hamilton and discussed subsequently by Henry Ogg Forbes; this material probably comes from the Te Aute region in the North Island. Forbes gave it the names Circus hamiltoni and Circus teauteensis, but since it seems no holotype was ever formally named nor can be deduced from the minimal description; these names are generally considered nomina nuda. C. teauteensis is considered valid, based on the argument that as with many New Zealand birds, it is reasonable to assume that North and South Island populations were at least distinct subspecies, if not species. But even though Kálmán Lambrecht mentioned a putative holotype tibiotarsus (which still exists in the BMNH) he explicitly stated that Forbes' names were both invalid. In addition, harrier bones of comparatively recent age in the collection of Walter Mantell, assigned to C. gouldi (an obsolete name of C. approximans) by Richard Lydekker, seem to be of a more robust bird judging from the published descriptions; this material may now be lost, but all things considered it is not unlikely to be the first remains of Eyles' harrier known to science.

== Extinction ==
The modern swamp harrier occurs all over New Zealand today. Even though the bones of its females can be mistaken for those of Eyles's harrier's males (as they differ little except in stoutness), all swamp harrier remains from the islands that have been studied in detail are some 1000 years old at most. That means that they post-date human settlement, i.e. there is no evidence for widespread coexistence of swamp and Eyles' harriers on New Zealand. Apparently, despite their considerable differences, the two harriers were still ecologically similar enough to competitively exclude one another, and only when the endemic Eyles' harrier became extinct could C. approximans become established.
