= Ripper (duck) =

Captive male Australian musk duck known for imitating human speech

- Species: Musk duck (Biziura lobata)
- Sex: Male
- Hatched: September 1983; Tidbinbilla Nature Reserve; Australian Capital Territory, Australia

Ripper was a male musk duck (Biziura lobata) hatched and reared in captivity at Tidbinbilla Nature Reserve, Australian Capital Territory who was recorded imitating sounds including human speech. Recordings of Ripper are believed to be the first material evidence of vocal learning in any waterfowl species.

== Life ==
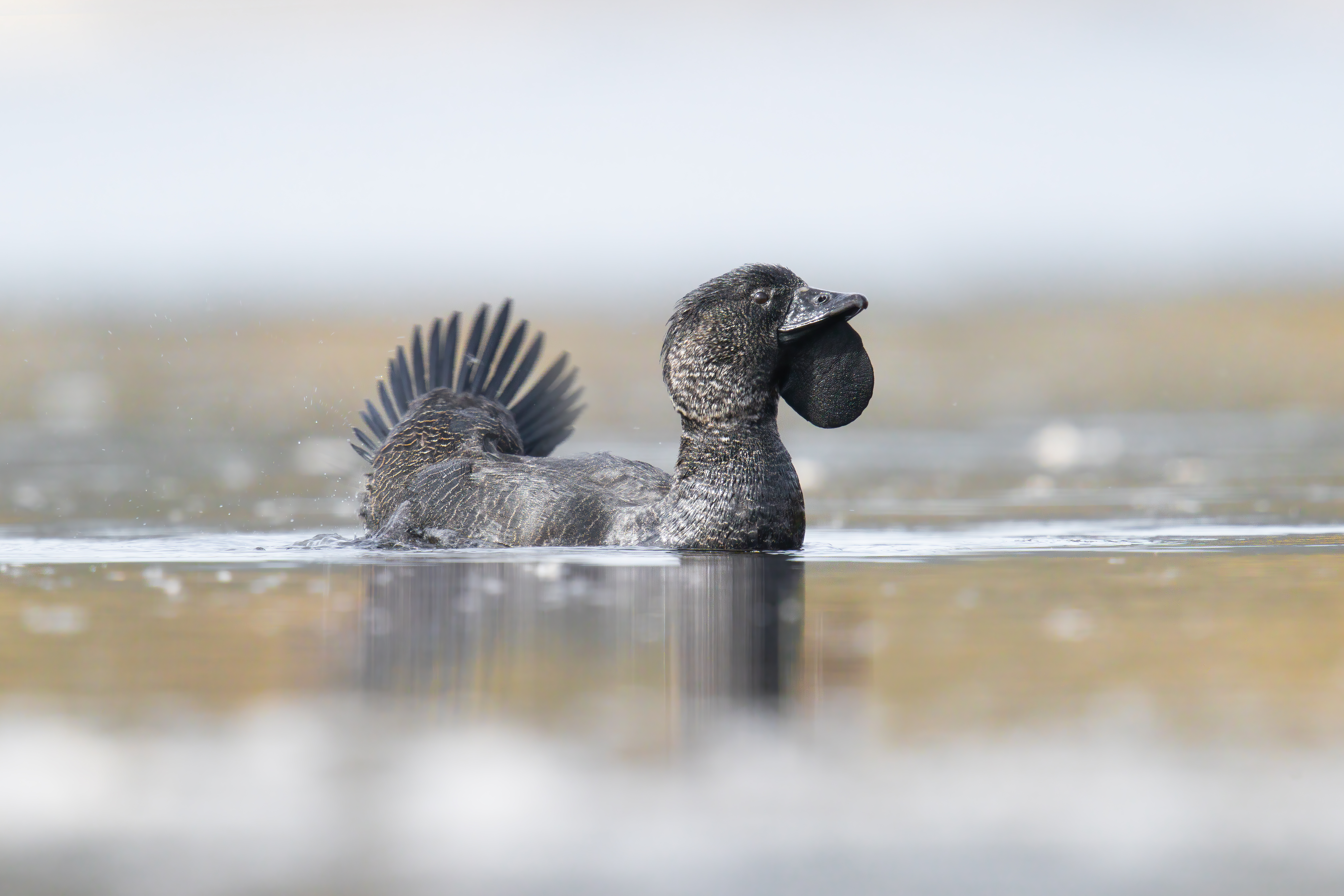
An example of a male musk duck, the same species as Ripper

Hatched at Tidbinbilla Nature Reserve in September 1983 from an egg collected from a wild musk duck nest in East Gippsland, Victoria, Ripper was incubated by a foster Bantam chicken and hand-reared by Jonathon Monroe. Musk ducks are rarely bred in captivity, and Ripper was the only musk duck at Tidbinbilla Nature Reserve at the time of his hatching. He would later be moved to a specialised pen, hidden from public view, and joined by two female musk ducks sourced from Serendip Sanctuary in Victoria. This pen was divided into two halves, with the underwater opening between the halves accessible only to the smaller females. Further details of Ripper's life are largely unknown, with all records at Tidbinbilla Nature Reserve having been destroyed in the January 2003 Canberra bushfires, though in 2021 The Washington Post reported that he was deceased.

== Vocal learning ==
It is unknown at what age Ripper began imitating sounds in his environment. His vocalisations were recorded on 19 and 26 July 1987 at approximately four years of age, reportedly shortly after keepers noticed the unusual behaviour. The recordings were produced by Peter J. Fullagar, a researcher working to produce an archive of Australian wildlife sounds, captured using a Sennheiser microphone and recorded onto a Sony Walkman cassette recorder.

The vocalisations recorded included a slamming door sound, a slamming door followed by a mumbled speech-like sound, and a speech-like phrase resembling "you bloody fool" or possibly "you bloody food". The slamming door sound is a three-part vocalisation that appears to imitate the opening and closing of the double-hung spring door of the pen Ripper was reared in as a duckling. The slamming door followed by a mumbled speech-like sound utilises the first two parts of the slamming door sound, but replaces the final element with a low-frequency mumbling sound that appears voice-like but does not contain any discernible words. The final vocalisation most closely resembles a human voice saying "you bloody fool" or "you bloody food", and is likely an imitation of a phrase heard from a keeper. All three vocalisations were accompanied by a courtship display typical of male musk ducks that involves the kicking of the feet and a vocalisation. This vocalisation normally takes the form of a whistling sound, but was partly replaced in these displays by Ripper's unusual vocalisations. All vocalisations were produced while the two female musk ducks in the enclosure were separated from Ripper in the other half of the enclosure. In recording the "you bloody foo(l/d)" vocalisation Fullagar stood close to the fence of Ripper's enclosure to "enrage" him into displaying, as Ripper was known to become aggressive to humans near the enclosure by scrambling along the inside of the fence attempting to attack and dashing around the pond while calling and splashing water.

The recordings produced by Fullagar were preserved at the Australian National Wildlife Collection, but went largely unnoticed until they were analysed in a scientific paper published in a 2021 issue of the journal Philosophical Transactions of the Royal Society B: Biological Sciences. The paper, authored by researcher Carel ten Cate of Leiden University and Peter J. Fullagar, analysed the unusual vocalisations of Ripper and another male musk duck at Tidbinbilla Nature Reserve who had been exposed to Ripper and was recorded in 2000 producing a sound similar to the slamming door sound, as well as mimicking the quacks of a Pacific black duck (Anas superciliosa). These recordings are believed to represent the first material evidence of vocal learning in any waterfowl species, though the 2021 paper also documented unverified reports of captive musk ducks in the United Kingdom imitating sounds.

== See also ==
- Hoover, a harbour seal held in New England Aquarium (United States) known to imitate human speech
- Kosik, an Indian elephant held in Everland (South Korea) known to imitate human speech
