= Jim Jackson =

Jim Jackson may refer to:

== Sports ==
- Jimmy Jackson (footballer, born 1875) (1875–?), Scottish footballer for Newcastle United and Woolwich Arsenal
- Jim Jackson (baseball) (1877–1955), Major League Baseball outfielder
- Jim Jackson (Australian rules footballer) (1890–1976), player and coach at Hawthorn
- Jimmy Jackson (racing driver) (1910–1984), American racing car driver
- Jimmy Jackson (footballer, born 1924) (1924-1979), Scottish footballer, played for Ballymena United, Third Lanark and Bury, see List of Bury F.C. players (1–24 appearances)
- Jimmy Jackson (footballer, born 1931) (1931–2013), Scottish footballer for Notts County
- Jimmy Jackson (wrestler) (1956–2008), American freestyle wrestler
- Jim Jackson (ice hockey) (born 1960), hockey player
- Jim Jackson (basketball) (born 1970), American professional basketball player
- Jimmy Jackson (tennis) (born 1975), American tennis player

== Others ==
- Jim Jackson (musician) (1876–1933), musician of the 1920s and 1930s
- Jim Jackson (sportscaster) (born 1963), ice hockey sportscaster

== See also ==
- James Jackson (disambiguation)
