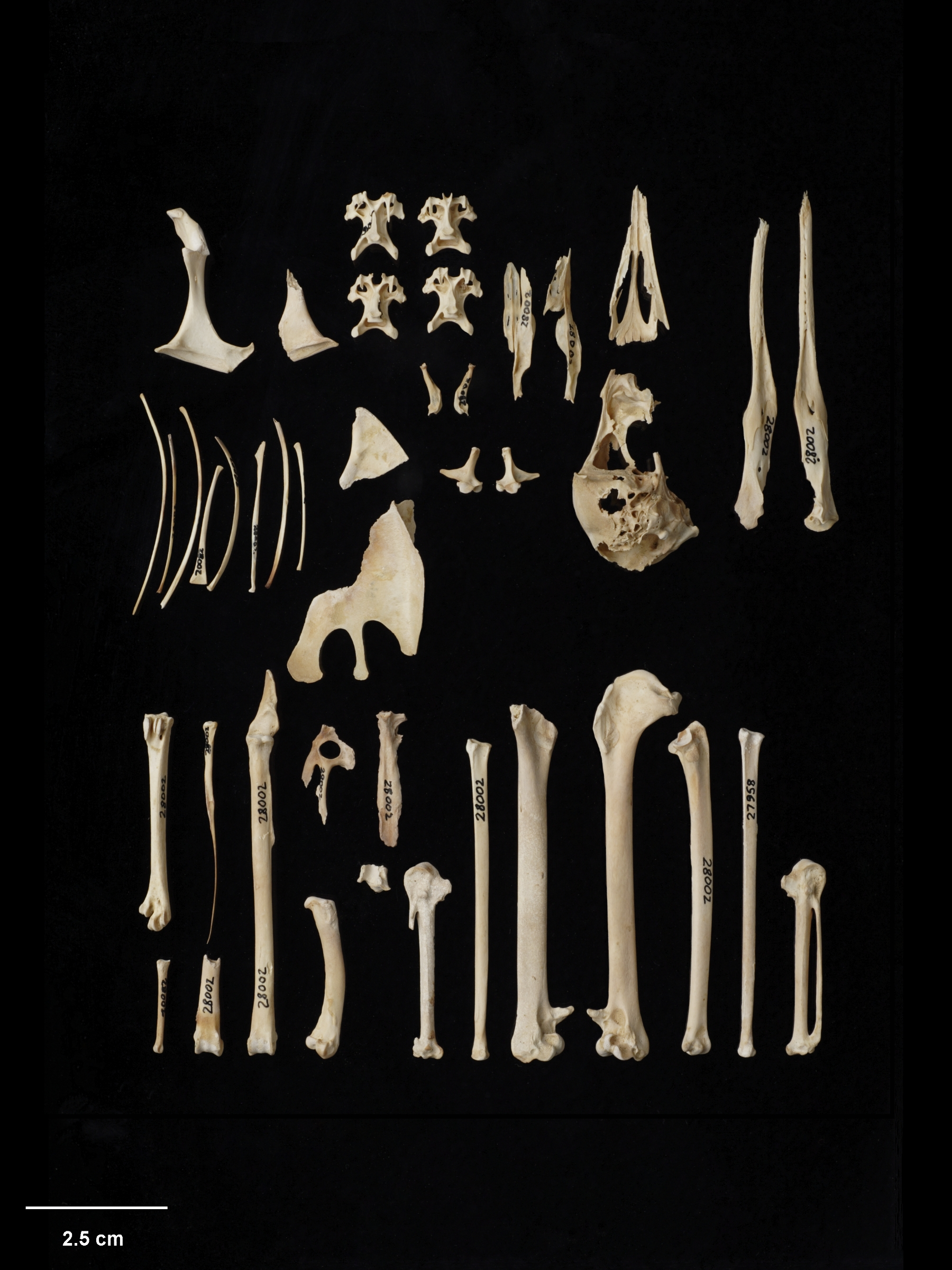
- Bones of holotypes Puffinus spelaeus, from the Field Collection 1986 of the Museum of New Zealand

Conservation status
- Extinct

Scientific classification
- Kingdom: Animalia
- Phylum: Chordata
- Class: Aves
- Order: Procellariiformes
- Family: Procellariidae
- Genus: Puffinus
- Species: †P. spelaeus

Binomial name
- †Puffinus spelaeus Holdaway & Worthy, 1994

= Scarlett's shearwater =

Scarlett's shearwater Temporal range: Pleistocene–Holocene

Extinct species of bird

Scarlett's shearwater (Puffinus spelaeus) (Māori: Ōiruki) is an extinct species of seabird in the petrel family Procellariidae. Its common name commemorates New Zealand palaeontologist Ron Scarlett, who recognised the bird's subfossil remains represented a distinct species.

This bird was described from bones collected in 1991 from a cave near the Fox River in the South Island of New Zealand. Subsequent discoveries of bones dating from 20,000 years ago to less than 600 years old reveal it was found only in the west and northwest of the South Island, in Northwest Nelson and Buller. Scarlett's shearwater was closely related to the fluttering shearwater (P. gavia) and Hutton's shearwater (P. huttoni), and DNA evidence from fossil bones show that all three had a common ancestor about 1 million years ago. It was smaller than its relatives, with an estimated weight of 250 g, and had the short wings characteristic of the fluttering shearwater. P. spelaeus is most likely to have been driven to extinction by a combination of exploitation by humans and predation by kiore/Polynesian rat Rattus exulans, which was introduced by Polynesians to New Zealand about 750 years ago.
