= James Jackson (clergyman) =

Methodist minister

James Jackson (c. 1789 or 1790 – 6 July 1851) was a Canadian Methodist minister.

Jackson grew up in Potsdam, New York. His family moved to Edwardsburgh, Upper Canada, shortly after the War of 1812. Jackson was given his deacon's orders in 1818, at the Genesee conference. He was reassigned to the Long Point circuit in 1819, where he rode alongside William Rundle. Membership in the Episcopal church increased by 7, to 511, on that circuit that year. In 1820, he was reassigned to the Long Point circuit, where he rode alongside William Williams. Although competition in Upper Canada between the Methodist Episcopal Church, of which Jackson was a member, and the Methodist Church of Great Britain led to an overall decrease in membership in the Episcopal church, Long Point saw an increase in membership of one hundred and two people. Egerton Ryerson lived in the Long Point area, and Jackson and Williams cajoled him into giving an exhortation, which went disastrously. In 1821, he was assigned to the Westminster circuit, where he rode alongside George Ferguson. The pair oversaw an increase in church membership of twenty-six. In 1822, he was assigned to the Thames circuit, where he rode alongside William Griffis. The pair oversaw an increase in church membership of thirty four people.

At the 1822 Genesee conference, a motion was presented to expel Jackson from the Methodist church. Although it failed to carry, a motion suspending his ordination.

Jackson was one of the chief organizers of the Canadian Wesleyan Methodist Church. At its peak the church had 7000 members. The church eventually merged into the Methodist Church of Canada in 1874.
