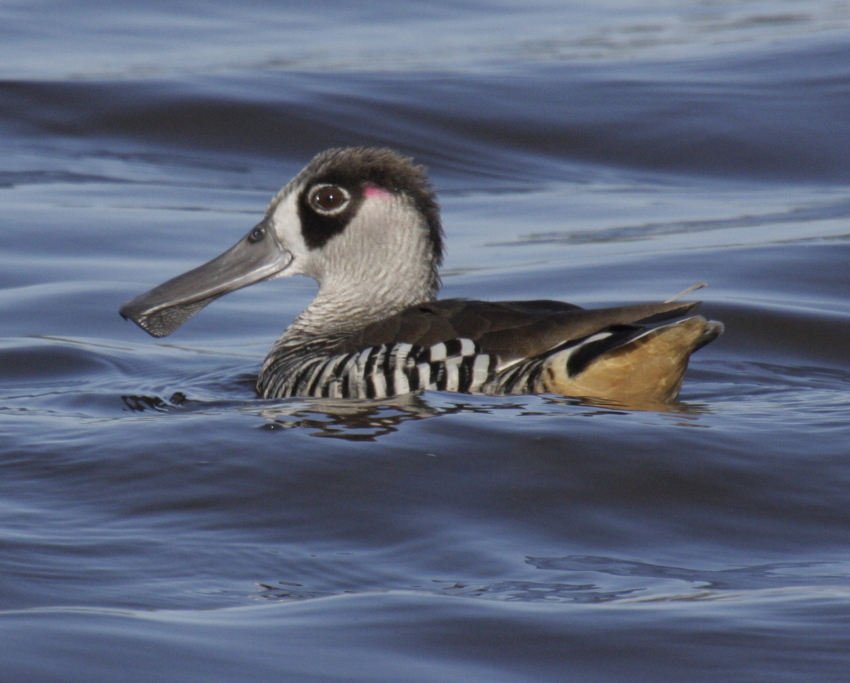
- Pink-eared duck (Malacorhynchus membranaceus)

Scientific classification
- Kingdom: Animalia
- Phylum: Chordata
- Class: Aves
- Order: Anseriformes
- Family: Anatidae
- Subfamily: Anatinae
- Genus: Malacorhynchus; Swainson, 1831

Species
- Malacorhynchus membranaceus †Malacorhynchus scarletti

= Malacorhynchus =

Genus of ducks

Malacorhynchus is a genus of duck within the family Anatidae. It was established in 1831 by English ornithologist William Swainson, when he proposed moving the pink-eared duck into a subgenus (Malacorhynchus) based on unique characters of its beak and toes. The genus contains one living and one extinct species.

== List of species ==
- Pink-eared duck (M. membranaceus)
- †Scarlett's duck (M. scarletti) – extinct
