= Tidbinbilla Nature Reserve =

Nature reserve in the Australian Capital Territory

- IUCN category II (national park)
- Location within Australian Capital Territory
- Location: Australian Capital Territory
- Coordinates: 35°27′47″S 148°54′48″E
- Area: 54.5 km^{2} (21.0 sq mi)
- Established: 1971
- Governing body: Territory and Municipal Services
- Website: Official website

Tidbinbilla Nature Reserve is a 54.5 square kilometres (21.0 sq mi) protected area, on the fringe of Namadgi National Park. Tidbinbilla is a short drive from the capital city of Australia, Canberra, in the Australian Capital Territory.

The nature reserve consists of a large valley floor, the Tidbinbilla Mountain and the Gibraltar range. The sides of the valley are steep and relatively undisturbed. The lower slopes of the valley are partly cleared and have a significant history of Aboriginal and European use. Tidbinbilla Mountain is believed to have been used for Aboriginal initiation ceremonies. The word 'Tidbinbilla' is Aboriginal in origin and comes from the word Jedbinbilla – a place where boys become men.

Known sites of Aboriginal significance at Tidbinbilla include the Birriagi Rock Shelter, which is the oldest Aboriginal site within the Australian Capital Territory. Bogong Rocks is a shelter where the oldest evidence of Aboriginal occupation was found at a bogong moth resting site.

The nature reserve is classified as an IUCN Category II protected area. It is the traditional country of the Ngunnawal people.

== History ==
=== Indigenous history ===
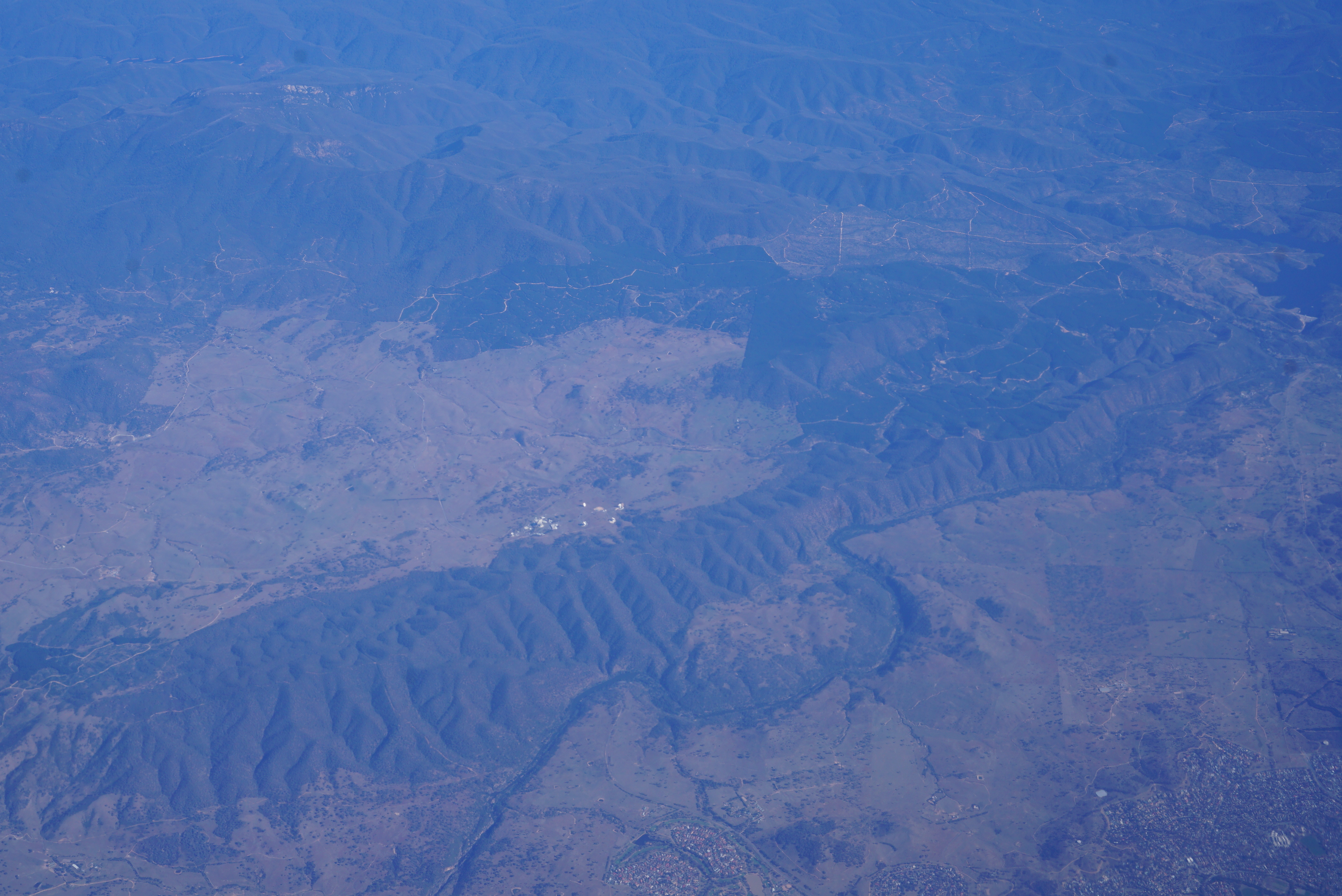
Tidbinbilla with the Canberra Deep Space Communication Complex from the air

Aboriginal people have inhabited the Tidbinbilla area since antiquity. Archaeological digs at Birrigai, over the hill from Tidbinbilla, found the earliest evidence of the use of fire, dated at 20,000 years old. This was at the time of the last ice age. Excavations at Hanging Rock has dated occupation of that site to some 16,000 years.

The name Tidbinbilla is derived from the Aboriginal word 'Jedbinbilla' meaning a place where boys become men. The last corroboree, an Australian Aboriginal dance ceremony, held at Tidbinbilla was circa 1904. There are aboriginal rock paintings to be found at Gibraltar Peak in a small cave.

=== European history ===
There are over 100 years of European occupancy within the nature reserve. Nil Desperandum and Rock Valley Homestead are both pise rammed earth buildings built in the 1890s. Both buildings were built by George Green and George Hatcliff. Nil Desperandum is a historic four-roomed residence alongside Hurdle Creek first occupied by Henry French Gillman. The remains of a commercial camellia plantation and the best preserved eucalyptus distillery in the ACT are also nearby.

The Rock Valley Homestead was occupied by the Green family. Nil Desperandum was later occupied by George Greens daughter Elsie Jane and her husband Eric Blewitt from the early 1930s to the early 1950s when Eric was killed drenching a horse.

Both Nil Desperandum and the Rock Valley Homestead buildings were severely damaged during the 2003 Canberra bushfires. Nil Desperandum has since been rebuilt in its original condition and design with the kitchen extension but not the enclosed side verandah that the two brothers John Douglas (Doug) & Cyril Leslie (Ned) both slept in.

== History of the nature reserve ==
In 1936 about 8.10 square kilometres (3.13 sq mi) were set aside as a public reserve. In 1939 a koala enclosure was built by the Institute of Anatomy. The government acquired additional land to establish a national park and fauna reserve in 1962, extending the national park to 36.29 square kilometres (14.01 sq mi). Tidbinbilla was later expanded again to its current size.

In 1966 the park saw the appointment of park ranger and later manager, David Bruce Kerr. He developed many of the bush walking tracks, enclosures, water fowl areas and roads throughout the park. Under his management the Cape Barren goose enclosure and conservation scheme was developed which has significantly contributed to the survival of the endangered species. In 1969 the first wildlife displays were created. David oversaw the importation of Victorian koalas to the park, the establishment of kangaroo enclosures and the creation of the water fowl areas. Many of the picnic areas enjoyed by generations of visitors were established under his management. David left Tidbinbilla in 1974 to oversee the foundation of Namadgi National Park.

In 1971 the nature reserve was officially gazetted.

The Tidbinbilla Nature Reserve is located adjacent to the Canberra Deep Space Communications Complex, part of the NASA Deep Space Network.

1988 saw one of the world's first international TV satellite linkups "World Safari" be broadcast from Tidbinbilla's kangaroo enclosure. The ABC linked up with fellow broadcasters across the globe in a live natural history program, which was an idea from David's daughter, Fiona Kerr.

In 2003, bush fires devastated the nature reserve with many of the koala population being lost to the fires. The Manager's Residence was also lost and there was damage to the Heritage listed Rock Valley and Nil Desperandum homesteads.

On 7 November 2008, the nature reserve was added to the Australian National Heritage List as one of eleven areas constituting the Australian Alps National Parks and Reserves.

Since 2011, Tidbinbilla has taken the charge of breeding of the critically endangered northern corroboree frog, the southern brush-tailed rock-wallaby and the eastern bettong on behalf of the ACT Government. It has been successful in the endeavour over the years.

== Fauna ==
Tidbinbilla Nature Reserve has a wide variety of bushwalks - ranging from 30 minutes to over 6 hours. It is a native habitat for kangaroos, wallabies, platypus, koalas, lyrebirds, emus, and other wildlife. Ninety-nine percent of the park was burnt out in the Bendora bushfire of 18 January 2003, resulting in the loss of countless numbers of wildlife. Of the captive animals, only one koala, six rock wallabies, five potoroos, four freckled ducks, and nine black swans survived the bushfire.

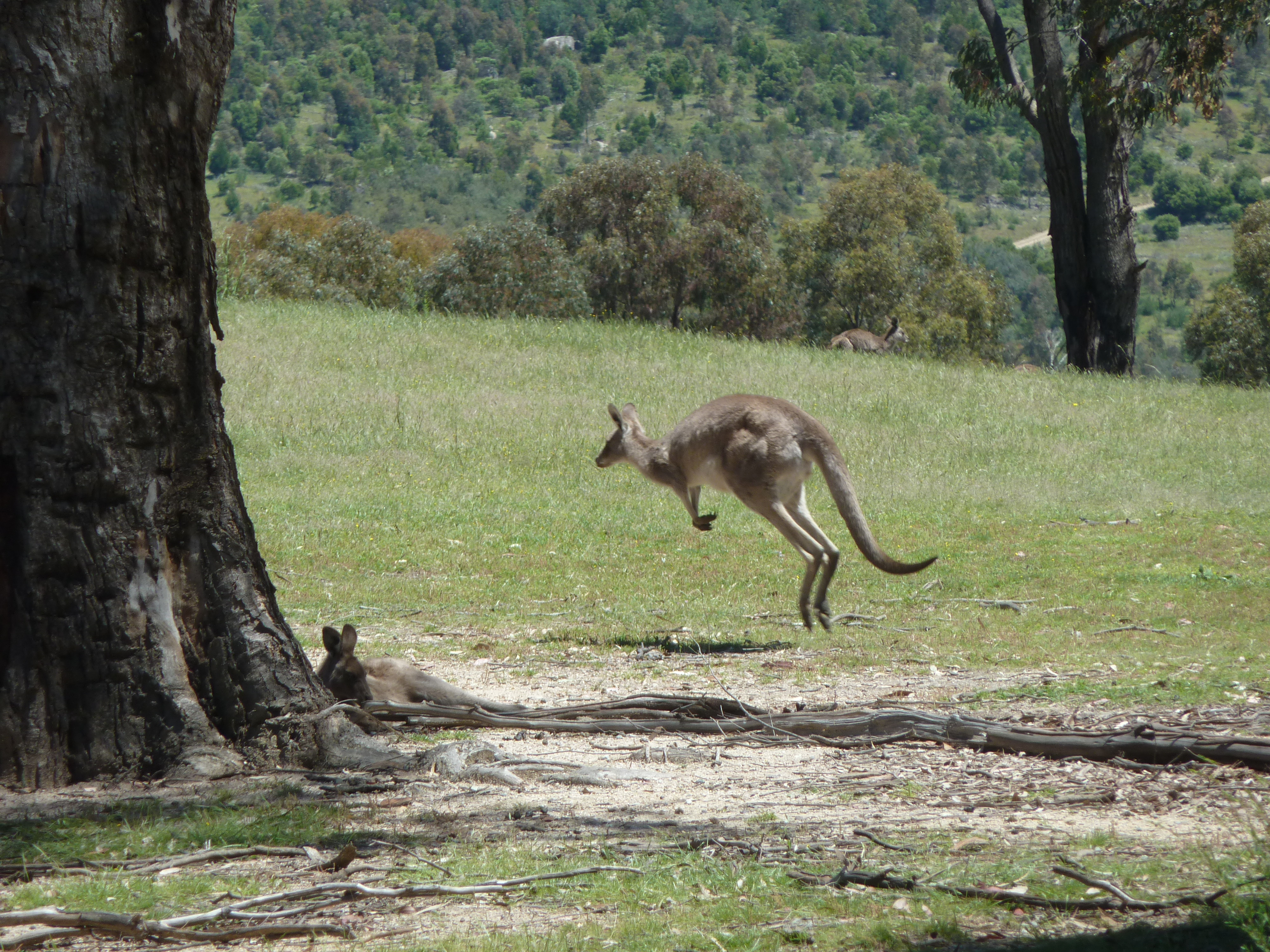
Eastern grey kangaroos

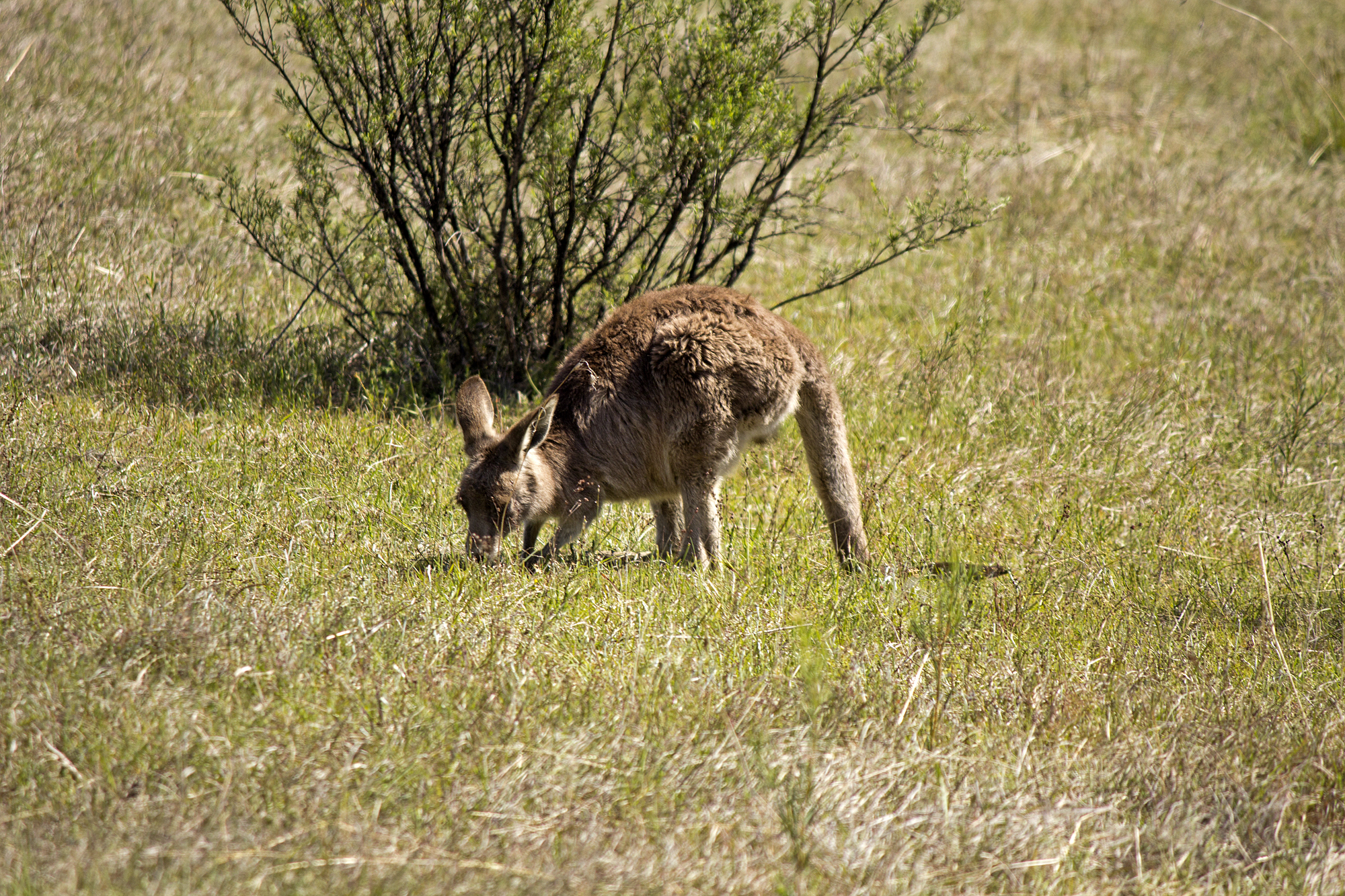
Eastern grey kangaroo along the Gibraltar Peak Trail in the Reserve

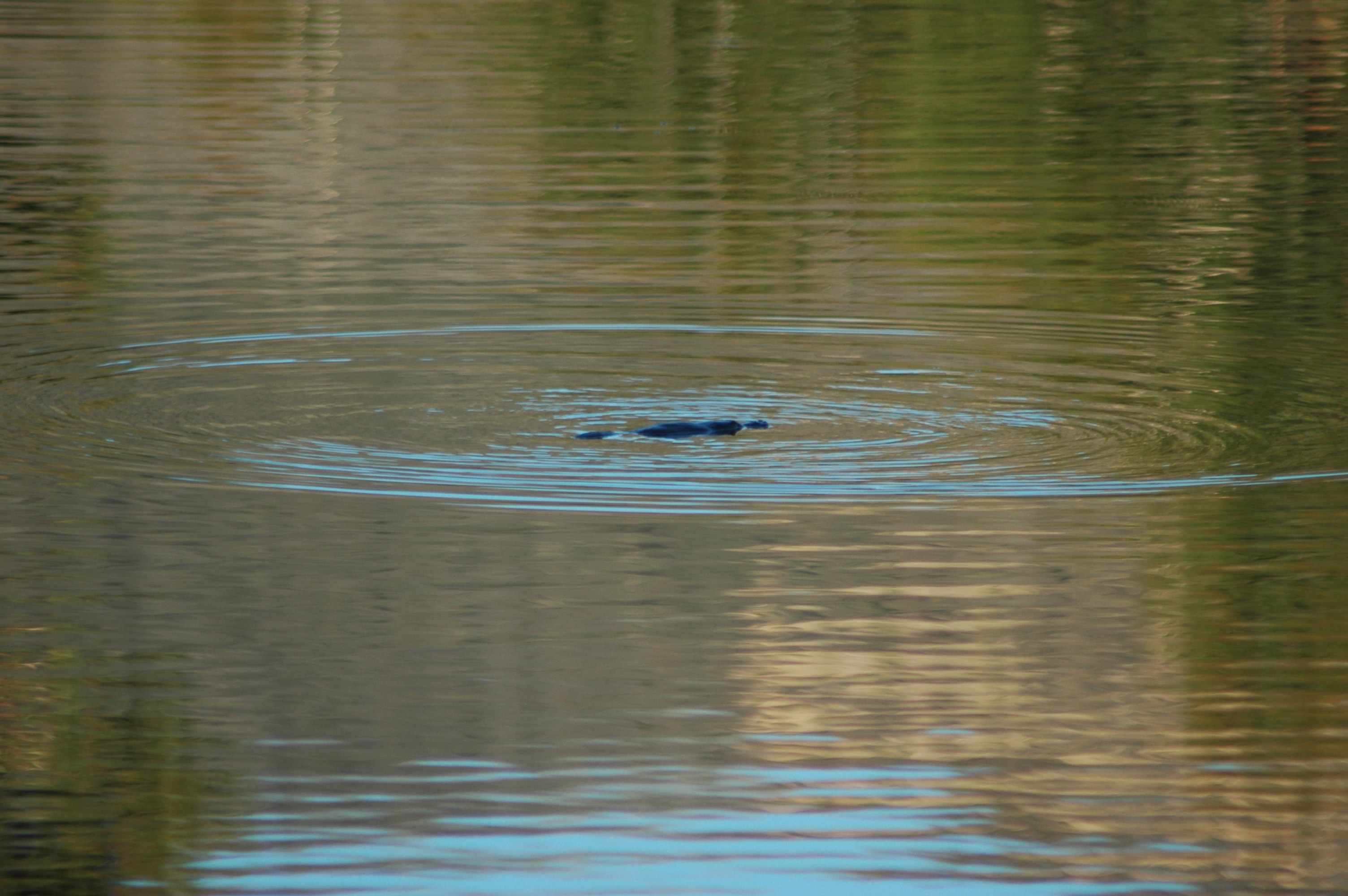
Platypus in the reserve

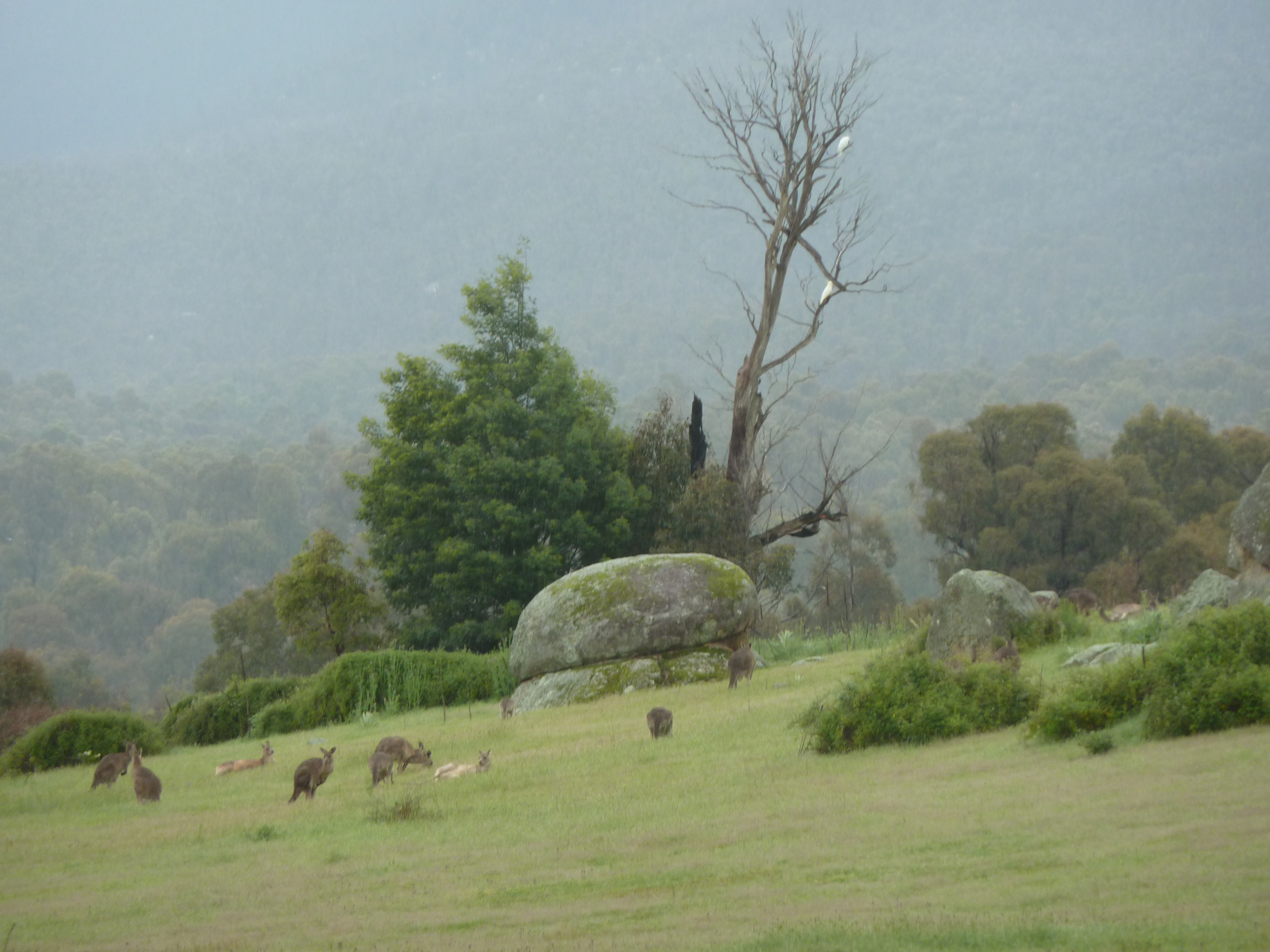
Landscape with kangaroos

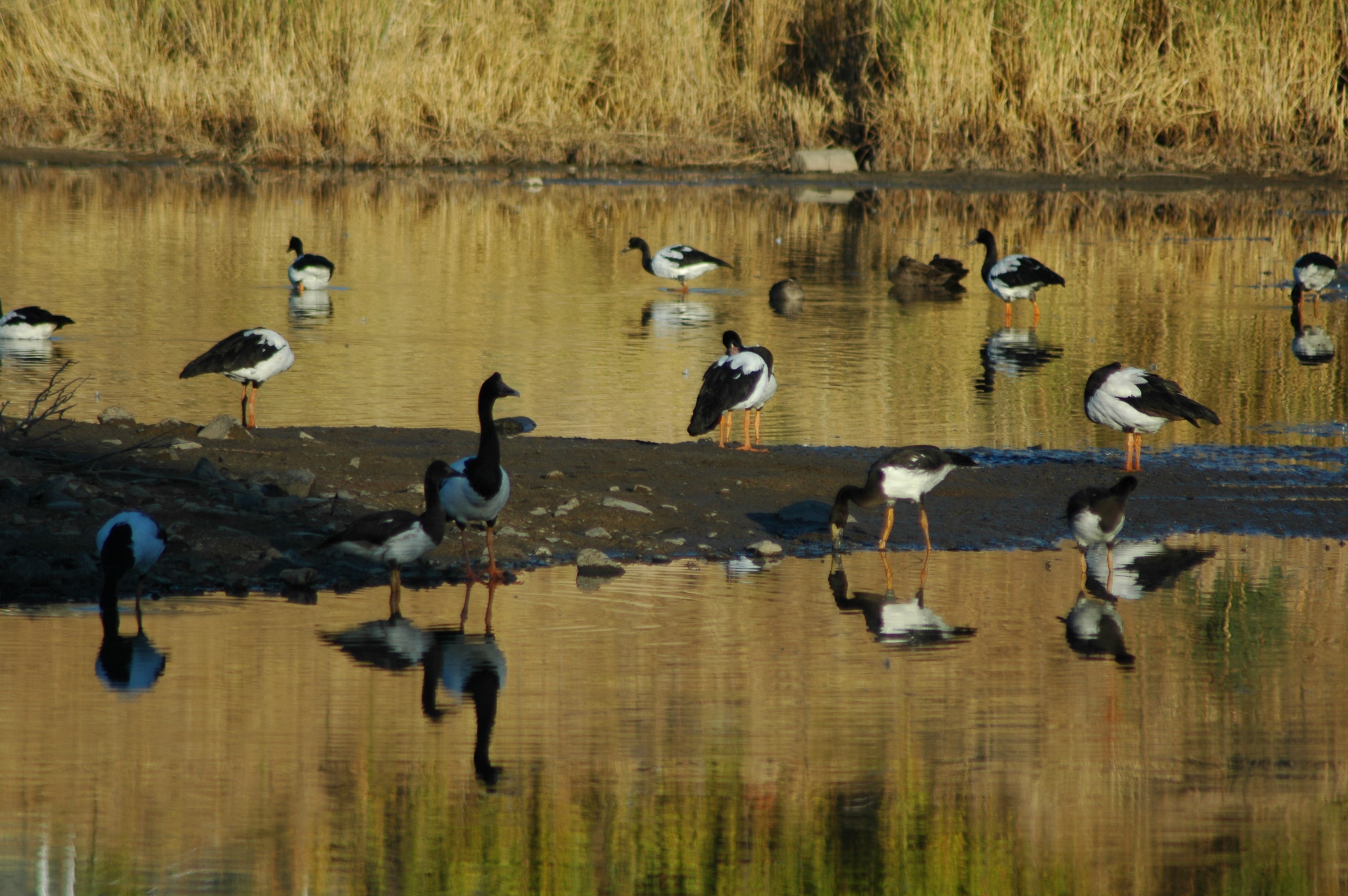
Magpie geese

== Walking tracks ==
There are a variety of walking trails which enable people to explore the Tidbinbilla Nature Reserve. There is a trail to suit all fitness levels and lengths of walks range from 30 minutes to 6 hours.

=== Congwarra Trail ===
The Congwarra trail is ideal for families. It is a 3–4 km walk that will take visitors approximately 1 hour to complete. This trail starts at the Visitor Centre and leads to the Nature Discovery Playground and picnic area. The playground design is inspired by the Tidbinbilla Valley and blends into the surrounding environment in an effort to preserve the park's natural beauty.

=== Birrigai Time Trail ===
The Birrigai Time Trail is an easy 3 km walk that takes visitors back in time to explore the local Aboriginal and European heritage. Birrigai is the Ngunnawal word for laughter. This trail is a predominantly flat walk that starts at the Visitor Centre and ends at the Birrigai Rock Shelter. Birrigai is the Ngunnawal word for laughter.

The Birrigai Rock Shelter is the oldest Aboriginal rock shelter in the ACT. It is highly valued by the local Aboriginal community as it has a high level of cultural significance. Artefacts have been found at the shelter dating back 25,000 years.

=== Turkey Hill Trail ===
This short trail is approximately 500m and will take visitors 15 minutes. Granite boulders and panoramic mountains surround this as visitors make their way up to Turkey Hill. Drive from the Visitor Centre to the Dalsetta carpark to access the start of this trail.

=== Xanthorrhoea Loop ===
Start this walk at Dalsetta carpark and follow the small brown signs that line the trail. This trail overlaps with the longer Gibraltar Peak trail.

Xanthorrhoea Loop is named after the Xanthorrhoea group of 30 species of native Australian plants. This group of plants are commonly referred to as grass trees are seen along the trail.

=== Church Rock Heritage Loop ===
This walk starts at the Flints BBQ area in Tidbinbilla and is 2.5 km long. It is an easy walk designed for low intensity exercise.

The walk takes visitors past early European settler sites and remains which date back to the late 1800s. Explore the history of the Flints Homestead and Sheedy's Home Site as the path slowly winds up the hillside and loops around the reserve.

The slowly winds up the hillside and crosses over the main road that loops around the reserve. On the walk visitors will come across a bench that they can rest on while they take in the spectacular mountain views.

After taking in the views of the Gibraltar Ranges there will be a short walk to the Church Rock. Diaries dating back to the 1800s indicate the bass of the rock was the meeting point for children to receive religious lessons. There is also evidence the local Aboriginal people used this rock as meeting place.

=== Sanctuary Loop ===
The Sanctuary Loop allows visitors at Tidbinbilla to be up close and personal with a range of native animals in their natural habitat. The 2.5 km loop is easy and flat walk with well signposted with information about the local history and the native flora and fauna. The wheelchair accessible and child friendly pathway winds through a series of interconnected habitats.

In the Sanctuary visitors will be able to get close to Brush-tailed Rock-wallabies, platypus, echidnas, birds, and other animals in their natural habitats. While they are interesting to look at it is important that visitors do not touch or disturb these wild animals.

=== Gibraltar Peak ===
This moderate to hard level walking trail is 8.2 km long and will take approximately 2–3 hours to complete. Starting at Dalsetta the trail passes through open grassland before it climbs to Eliza Saddle. After taking a short break at the picnic table here continue up the steep climb through rugged bushland to the Gibraltar Peak viewpoint.

As visitors ascend the boulders of the viewpoint they are able to take in 360-degree views of Tidbinbilla Nature Reserve, Canberra and Black Mountain Tower.

== See also ==
- List of Australian Capital Territory protected areas
- Corin Forest
- Ripper (duck), a musk duck reared at Tidbinbilla known to imitate human speech
