= Lake Poukawa =

Lake in New Zealand

- Location within North Island
- Interactive map of Lake Poukawa
- Location: North Island
- Coordinates: 39.7838°S 176.7010°E
- Primary inflows: Waipapa Stream
- Primary outflows: Poukawa Stream
- Basin countries: New Zealand
- Max. depth: less than 1 m (3.3 ft)

Lake Poukawa is a small shallow hardwater lake in the Hawke's Bay Region, North Island, New Zealand. It is located about 20 km south-west of Hastings, New Zealand, close to the settlement of Te Hauke. It is the largest lake lying within a peatland in the active tectonic Poukawa depression (or Poukawa Basin), between the Raukawa Range and Kaokaoroa Range of central Hawke's Bay. Its maximal depth is less than one metre and its diameter is ca. 1.5 km. It was deeper in the past (about 2.5 metre) but it was artificially drained after the 1931 Hawke's Bay earthquake. Lake Poukawa is drained by the Poukawa Stream, which flows north-eastward through the Pekapeka Wetland and eventually into the Clive River.

Lake Poukawa became a well-known paleontological site in 1956 when paleontologist Russell Price began with his excavations in the lacustrine deposits. Lake Poukawa had a species rich Pleistocene/Holocene waterfowl fauna. More than 13,400 anatid bones were unearthed at this site since 1956. Extinct birds found at Lake Poukawa include Biziura delautouri, Oxyura vantetsi, Mergus australis, Chenonetta finschi, Pachyornis geranoides, Ixobrychus novaezelandiae, Gallinula hodgenorum, Fulica prisca, Malacorhynchus scarletti, and Cnemiornis gracilis. Twelve km south of Lake Poukawa is the Te Aute swamp which is known for its moa fossils and tracks.
