= James H. Jackson =

American politician (born 1939)

James H. Jackson (born April 24, 1939) is a former science teacher, coach, businessman, and state legislator from Iowa. He was a Democrat. He was born in Waterloo, Iowa and graduated from East High School. He graduated from the State College of Iowa in Cedar Falls, Iowa. He married Janet L. Norman in 1958 and they had three daughters. He was hired by Pepsi.

He lived in Waterloo, Iowa and headed the science department at McKinstry High School. He was a Democrat. He was a Chancellor in the Knights of Pythias.
