= James Hayter Jackson =

Mariner, whaler, trader

- Born: 24 November 1800; London, England
- Died: 2 August 1877 (aged 76)
- Other name: Jimmy Jackson
- Occupations: Mariner, whaler, trader
- Known for: Early New Zealand shore-based whaling; second-in-command at Te Awaiti whaling station

James Hayter Jackson (24 November 1800–2 August 1877), commonly referred to as Jimmy Jackson was a New Zealand mariner, whaler and trader.

Born in London on 24 November 1800 he first came to New Zealand in 1829, as an under the command of Captain John (Jacky) Guard, and later became second in charge under Guard at New Zealand's first shore-based whaling station, situated at Te Awaiti on the Arapaoa Island shore of Tory Channel.
