= Pyramid Valley =

Locality in Canterbury, New Zealand

Coordinates: 42°58.0′S 172°37.60′E

Pyramid Valley is a locality in the Hurunui District of New Zealand. It is well known for its prominent limestone rock formations. It is located near Waikari in the North Canterbury region, 80 km north-west of Christchurch.

On the foot of the valley is a swamp which became notable in 1939 as New Zealand's largest paleontological site for moa fossils. The swamp was formed around 18,000 BC and became drained c. 2,000 years ago. It provided a lush vegetation which attracted five different moa species. In 1938, the landowners Joseph and Rob Hodgen found three large bones of Dinornis giganteus while they buried a dead horse in the swamp. They opened this area for excavations and in the early 1940s fossil hunters like Robert Falla, Roger Duff, Robert Cushman Murphy, Jim Eyles, Ron Scarlett and many others began their research work at this site and unearthed the remains of long extinct birds including more than 183 complete moa skeletons and tens of thousands of fossil bone fragments from about 46 species of modern birds.

Pyramid Valley is now also well known for its wine.
