= List of individual seals and sea lions =

The following is a list of individually notable pinnipeds, a taxonomic family which includes seals, sea lions, and walruses.

== List ==
- Andre the Seal (1961–1986), a harbour seal who was found off in Penobscot Bay, Maine, United States.
- Chonkers, a Steller sea lion known for its large size and its 2026 visit to Pier 39 in San Francisco.
- Freya, a vagrant walrus who appeared along the coast of western Europe.
- Hoover (c. 1971–1985), a harbour seal who imitated basic human speech.
- Humphrey, a visitor of Katikati in New Zealand
- Midge the Sea Lion (1985–2010), a resident of Oklahoma City Zoo
- Mum, the first sea lion to give birth in mainland New Zealand for over a century.
- Neil the Seal (born 2020), a southern elephant seal in Tasmania, Australia.
- Owha, a leopard seal who resided in the northern North Island of New Zealand.
- Popeye, a harbour seal who would often go to the marina of Friday Harbor on San Juan Island, Washington.
- Ronan, a sea lion known for being able to "dance" to music.
- Slippery the Sea Lion (d. 1967), a Californian sea lion who escaped a marine mammal park in London, Ontario, Canada.
- Stena, a vagrant walrus who appeared in the Gulf of Finland.
- Tama-chan, a bearded seal who was spotted in Tama River in Tokyo, Japan.
- Thor, a vagrant walrus appearing along the coast of western Europe.
