= Hoover (seal) =

Harbor seal who could imitate human voice

- Hoover in 1984
- Born: c. 1971; Maine, U.S.
- Died: July 25, 1985 (aged 13–14); New England Aquarium; Boston, Massachusetts, U.S.
- Children: 6
- Sample of Hoover's speech

Hoover (c. 1971 – July 25, 1985) was a harbor seal who was able to imitate basic human speech.

== Cundy’s Harbor ==
On May 5, 1971, Scottie Dunning discovered a tiny male harbor seal pup on the shore of Cundy's Harbor, Maine. After a failed attempt at locating the pup's mother, Dunning called his brother-in-law George Swallow for help. When Swallow arrived, the two searched for the mother seal and later found her dead among the rocks.

After careful consideration, Swallow finally decided to take the seal pup home with him. At first, it refused to drink milk from a bottle, but once advice was given by a neighbor to grind up fish and offer it to the pup, he sucked it up like a Hoover (vacuum cleaner), hence his name.

The Swallows kept him in their bathtub, but this proved too inconvenient within a few days; as such, George moved him out back to a spring-fed pond where he set up a "pup tent" enclosed by a wire fence. Hoover lived very much like a family dog and even accompanied George riding into town with his head poking out of the window.

As Hoover grew, so did his appetite, and the Swallows found themselves contracting a firm in Portland, Maine, to supply them with enough fish. The Swallows spoke to the seal pup constantly. Alice Swallow recalls in her book, Hoover the Seal and George: "If George was late in giving Hoover his breakfast [he] found his way up to the back steps … George would yell, 'Hello, there'. George and Hoover were great friends. Sometimes Hoover would hide … and would not appear until George yelled, 'Get out of there and come over here!' Then Hoover would come out of hiding and rush over to George and greet him with a wet, fishy kiss." It was during this time that Hoover began to mimic George's thick, gruff accent and catchphrases.

Soon, however, the Swallows reluctantly decided they could not keep Hoover, due to his increasing growth and enormous fish intake. In August, they contacted the New England Aquarium, who agreed to accept Hoover at their facility.

== New England Aquarium ==
Upon their arrival, George informed the Aquarium staff that Hoover could talk, but none of the attendants believed him so he did not press the point. It was not until five years later, as an adult seal, that Hoover became comfortable with his surroundings at the Aquarium and began to utter phrases such as: “Hello, there!” and “Come over here!” in a thick New England accent similar to Swallow’s.

On account of this unique feature, Hoover became famous and appeared along with the Swallows in publications such as Reader’s Digest and The New Yorker and the television program Good Morning, America.

== Death ==
Hoover died on July 25, 1985, due to complications during his annual molt. His obituary was published in The Boston Globe.

== Legacy ==
None of Hoover's six pups (daughters Joey, Amelia, and Trumpet and sons Lucifer, Cinder, and Spark) spoke, but his grandson Chacoda (or "Chucky") has shown an ability to be guided in his vocalizations. As of 2007, Chucky remains vocal but has not shown an ability to mimic human speech. Aquarium staff continue to work with him.

On December 1, 2006, host Stephen Fry discussed "Hoover the talking seal" on the British television show QI.

In 2013, Derek Kaloust and Anna Tillett wrote the children’s book, Hoover the Talking Seal, about Hoover and the Swallows.

== See also ==
- NOC (whale)
- Batyr (elephant)
- Vocal learning
- Talking animal
- Koko
- Nim Chimpsky
- Washoe
- List of individual seals and sea lions
