= NOC (whale) =

Beluga whale known for making human-like vocalizations

- Species: Beluga whale
- Born: 1977 or before
- Died: 1999 (aged around 22)

NOC was a beluga whale who made human-like vocalizations. He was captured by Inuit hunters for the United States Navy in 1977 and lived in captivity until his death in 1999. In 1984, researchers from the National Marine Mammal Foundation discovered his unusual ability to mimic the rhythm and tone of human speech. Belugas' human-like voices had been described in the past, but NOC's voice was the first to have been recorded.

== Capture and captivity ==
NOC was legally captured by Inuit hunters in 1977 as a juvenile. The name "NOC" is a play on "no-see-ums", biting midges found in Manitoba where he was caught. He lived in captivity for 22 years until his death in 1999. His human-like vocalizations were first noticed in 1984 and stopped about four years later when he became sexually mature.

== Human-like sounds ==
NOC's speech-like sounds
Recorded using equipment described in Ridgway et al.

Beluga whales have been called "canaries of the sea", and anecdotes of their capacity for mimicry have been reported in the past. For example, the first two scientists to study the calls of wild Belugas wrote that "occasionally the calls would suggest a crowd of children shouting in the distance", and keepers at the Vancouver Aquarium said that a 15-year-old Beluga named "Lagosi" was able to speak his own name. However, NOC's human-like calls were the first of their kind to be recorded.

NOC's vocalizations were recorded and studied by a team of biologists from the National Marine Mammal Foundation (NMMF) led by Sam Ridgway. In 1984, Ridgway and others at the NMMF began to hear peculiar sounds coming from the whale and dolphin enclosure. They were reminiscent of two people talking in the distance, the words just beyond the limit of comprehension. Later, a diver working in the enclosure came to the surface after he heard someone cry "out, out, out!" After he asked his colleagues "Who told me to get out?", they realized it had been NOC. They immediately began to record the sounds and reward him for the behavior, teaching him to make them on command. Eventually, they installed a pressure sensor in his nasal cavity to better understand the mechanism by which the sounds were produced.

According to Ridgway, "They were definitely unlike usual sounds for a beluga, and similar to human voices in rhythm and acoustic spectrum." Unlike humans who use their larynx to produce sounds, whales use their nasal tract. Data gathered from the pressure sensors indicated that NOC was using his nasal tract as well, although he altered his normal vocal mechanics. In particular, he over-inflated his vestibular sac, which is normally used to prevent water from entering the lungs.

NOC's vocalizations were described during a conference in 1985, and in a 2012 paper by Ridgway et al. which appeared in Current Biology.

== See also ==
- Batyr (elephant)
- Hoover (seal)
- Kanzi
- Kosik (elephant)
- List of individual cetaceans
