= Freya (walrus) =

Sea creature

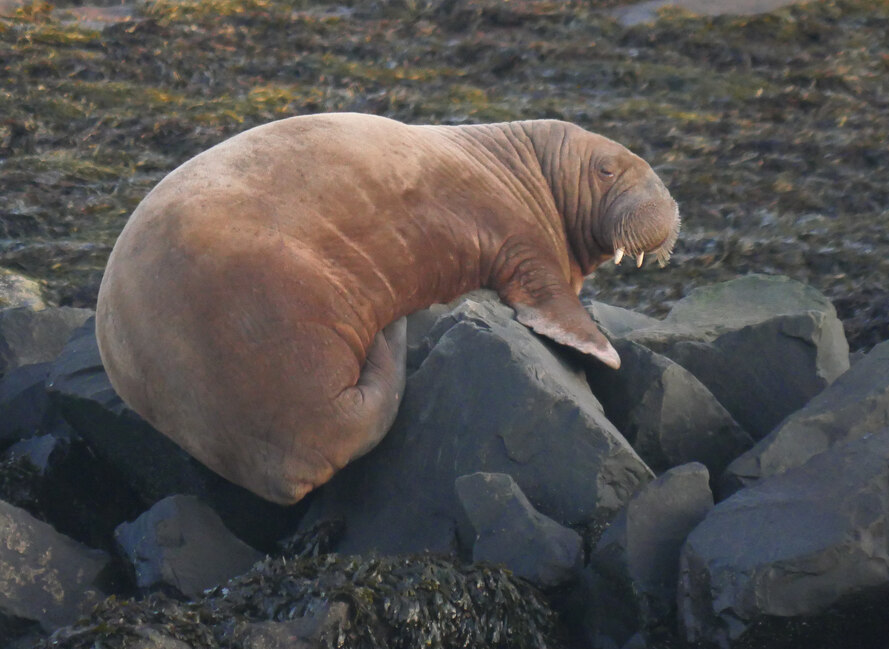
- Freya in Seahouses Harbour, November 2021
- Species: Walrus
- Sex: Female
- Died: 14 August 2022; Oslofjord, Norway
- Cause of death: Shooting (Note: The official statement by the Norwegian Directorate of Fisheries said that she was avlivet meaning "put down" or "euthanised".)
- Weight: 600 kg (1,323 lb; 94 st 7 lb)
- Named after: Freyja

Freya was a young female walrus who appeared along the coasts of several western European countries (the Netherlands, Germany, the United Kingdom, Denmark, Sweden, and Norway) from October 2021 until her death on 14 August 2022. A rare sighting in the areas where she appeared, she attracted the attention of wildlife enthusiasts and the wider public. In the summer of 2022, after sunbathing on and sinking boats in the Oslofjord, she was shot after concerns about her and the public's safety. She weighed approximately 600 kilograms (1,300 lb). The decision to kill Freya was criticised by many wildlife experts.

== Name ==
Freya was nicknamed after Freyja, the Norse goddess of love and beauty. The name was chosen by Frisian broadcaster Omrop Fryslân, after being spotted near Terschelling, from over 2,000 submissions from their audience.

== Biography ==
Although she might have been seen elsewhere as early as 2019, Freya was first spotted and subsequently named in October 2021 resting on top of the Dutch Walrus-class submarine HNLMS Dolfijn. She was the first walrus to visit the Netherlands in 23 years; walruses usually live several hundred miles north in the Arctic. In December 2021, she was seen relaxing on a salmon farm cage near the island of Vementry in Shetland. Before this, Freya had been spotted off the coasts of Denmark, Germany, and Northumberland in England. She was identifiable by a pink spot on her nose, as well as her small tusks and an old injury on her flipper, making her distinguishable from other wandering walruses Wally and Stena.

Scientists suspect that Freya originally lived on Svalbard in Norway, some 1,200 miles (1,900 km) away from Oslo. Caroline Radnofsky of the American NBC News speculated that climate change in the Arctic, which causes the ice cover to melt and thus increases competition for food, might have been a reason for Freya to stray so far from her natural habitat.

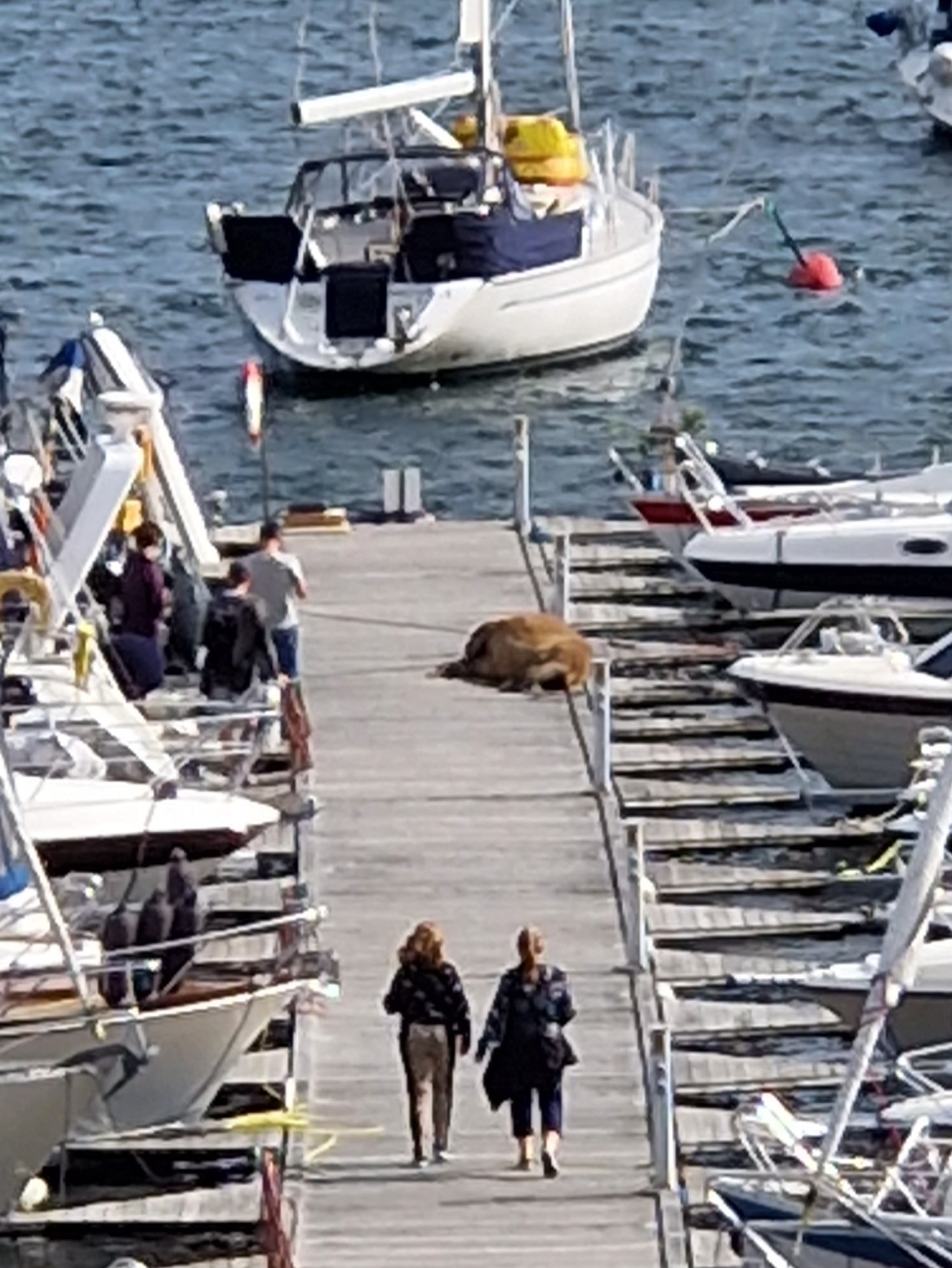
Freya resting on a floating dock in Sandvika in August 2022

In the summer of 2022, Freya had become known for hauling out on and occasionally sinking boats in the Oslofjord in order to sunbathe. Due to the attention from the media and public, many people went to see her, with many of them getting very close to Freya. A week prior to her death, the fisheries ministry published photographs of crowds of people who stood within touching distance of her. There was also evidence of people throwing items at Freya. This behaviour prompted warnings from Norwegian authorities, who said that approaching her could endanger both her and the public. In one incident, the police closed a bathing area after Freya chased a woman into the water. Biologist Per Espen Fjeld later explained: "She was not behaving like a typical wild animal. She sought out humans, which increased the risk of an accident. A friendly bump on a child swimming in the water could be fatal."

Due to the attention Freya was receiving, the fisheries ministry consulted a veterinarian on her condition, and considered that she was likely not getting enough rest and was stressed. Authorities had initially hoped that Freya would leave the area of her own accord. When crowds continued to come close to her, the Directorate of Fisheries decided on 12 August 2022 to kill her.

== Death ==
Freya chasing a duck at Blommenholm.

On the night of 13 August 2022, Freya was killed by a team of four men from the Norwegian Directorate of Fisheries. Their patrol boat arrived at the Oslo marina where the walrus was basking on a moored boat. The day before the killing the team took a video of Freya socialising with the marina staff. Then, during the night, the team shot her with a rifle, using bullets which were described as "the ammunition to be used for that type of animal". An anaesthetic dart was not used as there was concern that Freya would drown. The carcass was then covered with a tarp and towed away by boat.

Freya's carcass was delivered to a laboratory of the Norwegian Veterinary Institute where it was dismembered by a health surveillance team led by Knut Madslien. Many samples of her blood and organs were taken and then the other remains were dissolved in a large vat of lye to form a gel.

The boat on which Freya was killed was cleaned and returned to the marina. It belonged to a real estate developer, Fredrik Walsoe, who was not present during the killing.

=== Reaction ===
Frank Bakke-Jensen, the director general of fisheries, stated that the decision to kill Freya was based "on an overall assessment of the continued threat to human safety", saying also that "animal welfare was not being maintained". Bakke-Jensen also stated that other options had been explored, including the possibility of moving Freya from the fjord, which was discussed with the Norwegian Institute of Marine Research; these options were ultimately not carried out due to concerns regarding her welfare. (Note: For example, there had been fears that she might drown after being tranquilized for transport.) Norway's Prime Minister Jonas Gahr Støre the next day said he supported the killing, stating "It was the right decision. I am not surprised that this has led to many international reactions. Sometimes we have to make unpopular decisions."

The Washington Post acknowledged the potential difficulties with transporting marine animals, pointing to a beluga whale who died earlier in August during his attempted rescue from a river near Paris. On 20 July 2022, another wild walrus named Stena had died in Finland during an attempted transport to Korkeasaari Zoo for treatment; the two walruses had sometimes been compared to each other.

=== Criticism ===
Siri Martinsen, leader of animal welfare group NOAH – for animal rights, criticised the decision to kill Freya and said that other measures should have been tried first. She also suggested that "those who fail[ed] to keep their distance from the animal should [have been] fined", noting that it may have made people follow guidelines. According to Martinsen, fines had not been considered. Similar criticism was voiced by wildlife conservation organisations Seal Rehabilitation and Research Centre and SOS Dolphin in the Netherlands.

Rune Aae, a biologist from the University of South-Eastern Norway who had been tracking Freya's movement, called the decision "too hasty", saying that according to prior experience, "Freya had sooner or later gotten out of the Oslofjord". "This is Norway in a nutshell", he said, "Too often we kill the animals we don't like or can't cope with." Fredrik Myhre of WWF in Norway said the speed of the decision had surprised him, "They should have been more patient." The New York Times pointed out the timing of the killing, saying that with summer vacation in Norway coming to an end, crowds were "likely to ebb". The Norwegian Green Party submitted a question to the fisheries minister concerning the discarded alternate options.

Espen Fjeld said that Freya's death would not impact the walrus population, but pointed to Norway's decision in March 2022 to license more oil drilling in the Barent Sea as threatening the entire endangered species. "Nobody talked about that. That is the real challenge and threat to the walrus population."

=== Legacy ===
In April 2023, a bronze sculpture of Freya lying on her side by sculptor Astri Tonoian called For Our Sins was unveiled in Oslo, after an online fundraising campaign, organised by Erik Holm, raised $25,000.

== See also ==
- Thor
- Stena
