= Owha =

Leopard seal (born before 2012)

He owha nā ōku tūpuna
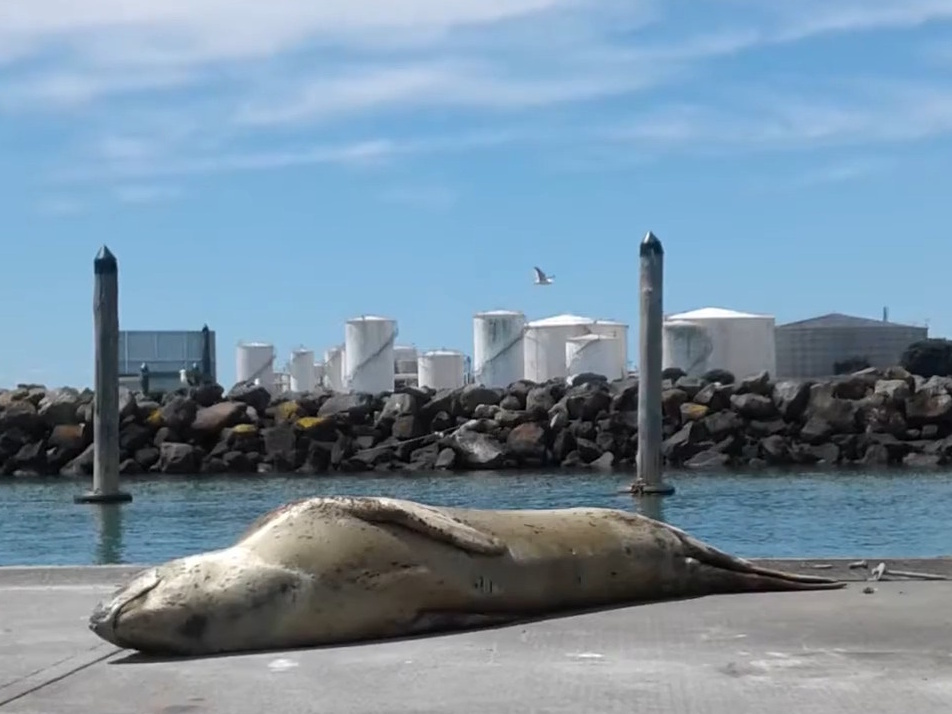
- Owha in 2016
- Other name: Owha
- Species: Leopard seal (Hydrurga leptonyx)
- Sex: Female
- Born: Before 2012
- Residence: Waters off the northern North Island, New Zealand

Owha ([ɔfa], born before 2012) is a leopard seal that has been seen throughout the northern North Island of New Zealand, such as in Auckland's Waitematā Harbour, where she likes to sleep on pontoons. Being known for what the news media website Stuff has described as "highly inquisitive behaviour", Owha sometimes breaks fenders and pops inflatable dinghies. The long form of her name, He owha nā ōku tūpuna, is Māori for "treasured gift from our ancestors". The name was given to her in 2016 by local hapū Ngāti Whātua ki Ōrākei. She was last seen in 2022.

Owha's presence in Waitematā Harbour has been contentious, with some people wanting her to be relocated due to her tendency to cause damage to marine equipment, and the danger she poses to children and pets. The Department of Conservation (DOC) has decided not to relocate her, due to the danger of anaesthetics towards leopard seals, and the possibility that she swims back to the harbour.

DOC describes Owha as "the longest tracked leopard seal in the world." She has helped encourage the research of the presence of leopard seals in New Zealand, which led to them being reclassified from a vagrant species to a resident species in 2019.

== Life ==
Owha was first spotted off Dunedin in 2012. Since 2015, she has been moving between various places in the country, including the east coast of Northland, Waitematā Harbour in Auckland, Dunedin, the Bay of Plenty, Whangārei, Waiheke Island and other islands in the Hauraki Gulf, as well as in mangroves. According to The New Zealand Herald, Auckland's Westhaven Marina is her "favourite sun-bathing spot". She likes to sleep on pontoons, which would attract crowds of people; during the COVID-19 pandemic, authorities discouraged people from posting her location online in order to avoid breaking COVID-19 gathering rules.

In 2016, local hapū Ngāti Whātua ki Ōrākei gave her the name "He owha nā ōku tūpuna", or Owha for short, meaning "treasured gift from our ancestors". Being known for what Stuff described as "highly inquisitive behaviour", Owha sometimes breaks fenders, and pops inflatable dinghies or floods them by putting her head inside. She has a body length of 3.1 m (10 ft) and a weight of 400 kg (880 lb), as well as a V-shaped scar on her left cheek and parallel scars on her right side.

In 2017, she had a fishing hook get lodged in a flipper. In October 2019, she was found with a bleeding face, which was soon identified as being a gunshot wound. She recovered. In order to find the suspect, a $5000 reward was offered by the conservation group Sea Shepherd, but the perpetrator was never found. In April 2022, the Department of Conservation (DOC), Auckland Zoo and LeopardSeals.org worked together to cut free fishing hooks, a fishing line and sinkers from outside her mouth by using a long pole with scissors on the end. But they were unable to remove the internal hook, as it would require that Owha be captured and anaesthetised, which the team considered too high-risk for Owha. Instead, they hoped the hook would rust away and the fishing line would be removed via defecation.

Because leopard seals may defend themselves when they perceive a threat, DOC has placed several signs around several Auckland marinas that are often occupied by Owha, which explain how to stay safe near her. It is encouraged that people keep a distance of at least 20 metres (66 ft), and to keep children and dogs away from her.

Owha has not been seen since May 2022.

== Calls for removal ==
Several people have suggested that Owha be relocated from Waitematā Harbour. One reason for this is the danger posed by leopard seals to children or pets. Another is her tendency to cause damage to marine equipment, as damage caused by her has totalled several thousand dollars.

The Department of Conservation has said that relocating Owha is not an option, as the tranquilisers needed for it could kill her, due to a dive reflex seals have which stops them from breathing. Another problem is that due to the fact that leopard seals often travel long distances, it is possible that if Owha were to be relocated, she may just make her way back to the harbour.

In 2019, DOC started trialling harmless ways to get rid of Owha from Westhaven Marina, starting by using light and then moving to sound and hose water as a last resort. A few months later, Empire Capital Limited—the owner of Bayswater, Pine Harbour and Hobsonville marinas—applied for rights to use those methods to remove her from their properties.

LeopardSeals.org spokesperson Krista Hupman encourages the co-existence with Owha and, by extension, leopard seals. She suggests giving them toys to play with, to distract them from causing damage to marine equipment.

== Research ==
According to DOC, Owha is "the longest tracked leopard seal in the world". In order to track her movements, and the movements of other leopard seals, DOC helped modify a phone app used to report Hector's dolphin sightings so that it can accept reports of other marine species.

Owha encouraged Krista Hupman to research the presence of leopard seals in New Zealand. She and LeopardSeals.org (which she co-founded) gathered over 3,000 sightings records from newspapers, museums, a new hotline, and Māori middens, as well as three records of births on the mainland. Following this, DOC reclassified leopard seals from a vagrant species in New Zealand to resident species in 2019.

== See also ==
- Mum (sea lion), who spent time in Otago
- List of individual seals and sea lions
