= Mum (sea lion) =

Individual New Zealand sea lion

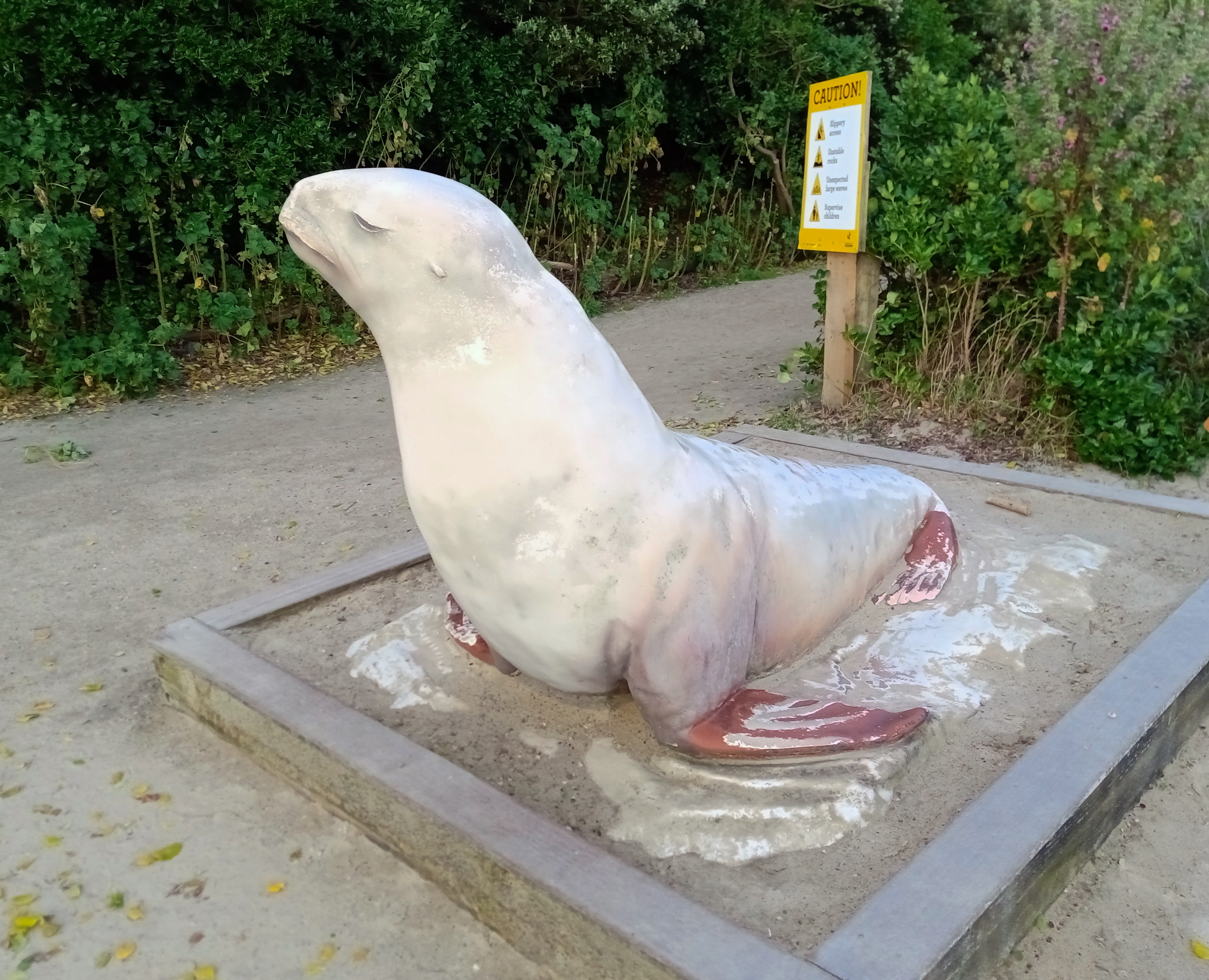
- Statue of Mum by Bryn Jones, St Clair Esplanade
- Species: New Zealand sea lion (Phocarctos hookeri)
- Sex: Female
- Born: 1980s Auckland Islands
- Years active: 1992–2010
- Known for: First sea lion to give birth in mainland New Zealand in over 100 years
- Offspring: 11

Mum was a New Zealand sea lion who in 1993 in Otago became the first sea lion to give birth in mainland New Zealand for over 100 years. All sea lions in Otago are descended from Mum. After having 11 pups, she disappeared in 2010, aged 24. It is not known when or how she died.

== Biography ==
Mum was born in the Auckland Islands in the 1980s, was tagged in 1986, and later appeared in Dunedin in 1992. This puzzled researchers as female New Zealand sea lions go to where they were born to give birth. There she gave birth on 1 January 1993 at Taieri Mouth, making her the first sea lion to give birth on the mainland for over 100 years, re-establishing the species on the mainland. Prior to Mum, sea lions were driven away from the mainland due to human settlement and would instead give birth in the subantarctic islands.

In January 2007 Mum gave birth to a pup. Five days later, Mum left the coast for sea, leaving the pup alone. The pup was found in a coma at St Kilda Beach, which prompted the Department of Conservation to try to save it, using a surrogate mother named Lorelie. Mum then spent three days at sea which was too long for the pup to go without food, prompting its euthanasia and burial in Taieri Mouth. When Mum came back, she looked thin and had a cataract in her right eye.

After having 11 pups, Mum disappeared in 2010, aged 24. It is not known when or how she died.

== Legacy ==
All New Zealand sea lions in Otago are descendants of Mum. In July 2015, twenty years after Mum gave birth on the mainland, a life-sized statue of Mum was unveiled on the Esplanade in the Dunedin suburb of St Clair, at 45°54′40.2″S 170°29′31.6″E. Designed by Bryn Jones, it was fabricated from fibreglass and polyurethane, for $11,000. On the 30th anniversary of Mum giving birth, a pregnant woman walked 30 kilometres (19 mi) to raise money for The Sealion Trust.

== See also ==
- Owha, a leopard seal in the northern North Island
- List of individual seals and sea lions
