= Humphrey (elephant seal) =

Humphrey was an elephant seal who spent time around Katikati in New Zealand during the late 1980s.

== Life ==
During the 1980s Humphrey spent time in Katikati and Tauranga Harbour. The first time Humphrey was spotted may have been in 1984, at Mayor Island / Tūhua, near Tauranga. He first came to Katikati in 1985, and throughout his time to 1989 visited Bowentown, Kauri Point, Uretara River and Waihi Beach. The last recorded sighting of him in this area was from 1989.

Humphrey had a reported "obsession" with a cow and would like to watch cows get milked at a farm, which scared the cows. At one point Humphrey broke a fence and a gate when looking for the animals. The elephant seal also reportedly once "tried to make love to a 10,000-gallon water tank", causing it to leak.

In October 1987, after the annoyed owners of the farm called the Department of Conservation, veterinarians attempted to use a tranquilliser gun to sedate the animal in order to transport it to the ocean. However, the tranquilliser darts could not make their way through Humphrey's thick blubber.

Humphrey disappeared in the late 1980s. It is not known what happened to him. The National Library of New Zealand has 12 photos of the elephant seal.

== Sculpture ==
In 1996 Neville Warner began making a sculpture of Humphrey, using a chainsaw, from a macrocarpa tree stump and using photographs of the elephant seal as a reference. It took a year to complete and in November 1997 was placed at The Landing, a place in Katikati where Humphrey would visit. The sculpture was originally brown, the colour of the wood, whereas Humphrey was grey. In 2019, the sculpture was painted to give it colour. The sculpture later became water damaged, to the point where it became unfixable. As a result, the sculpture was moved to a backyard in 2022 and a new sculpture will replace it.
