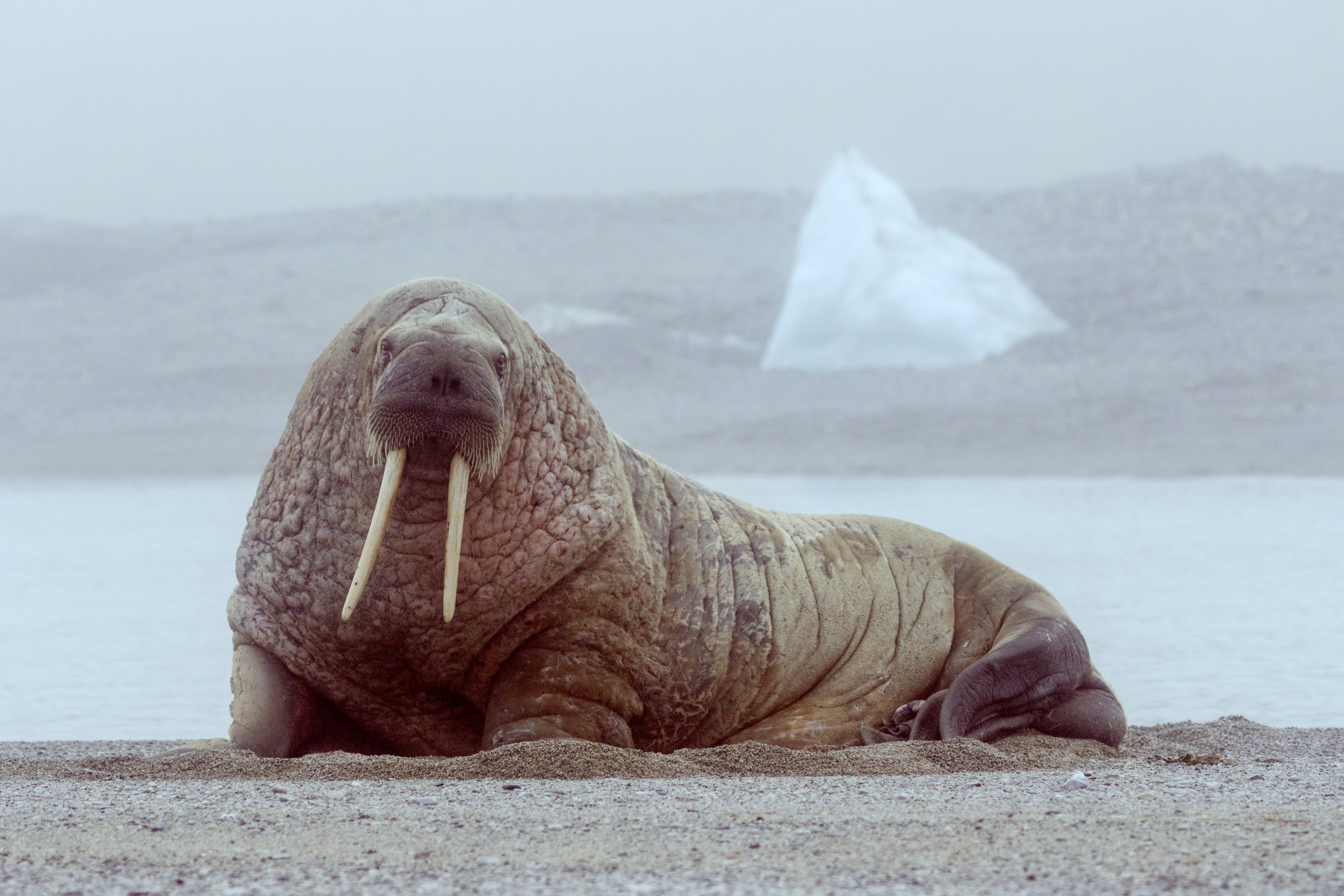
- Male Atlantic walrus, Novaya Zemlya
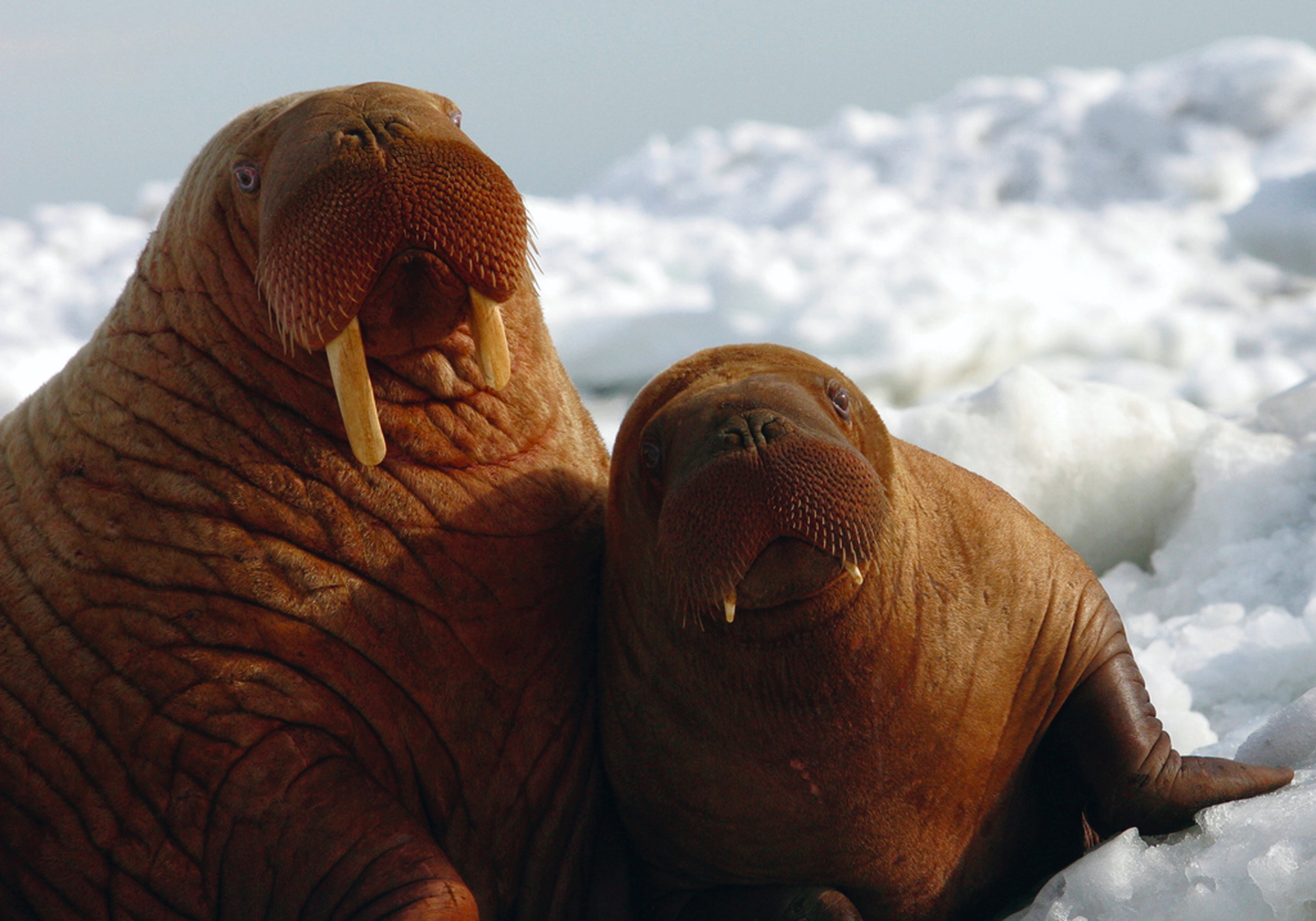
- Female Pacific walrus with young

Conservation status
- Vulnerable (IUCN 3.1)
- CITES Appendix III

Scientific classification
- Kingdom: Animalia
- Phylum: Chordata
- Class: Mammalia
- Order: Carnivora
- Parvorder: Pinnipedia
- Family: Odobenidae
- Genus: Odobenus; Brisson, 1762
- Species: O. rosmarus

Binomial name
- Odobenus rosmarus (Linnaeus, 1758)

Subspecies
- O. rosmarus rosmarus O. rosmarus divergens O. rosmarus laptevi (debated)
- Distribution of walrus

Synonyms
- Phoca rosmarus Linnaeus, 1758; Trichechus rosmarus Linnaeus, 1766

= Walrus =

Walrus Temporal range: Pleistocene to Present

Species of marine mammal with tusks

The walrus (Odobenus rosmarus; plural walrus or walruses) is a large pinniped marine mammal with discontinuous distribution about the North Pole in the Arctic Ocean and subarctic seas of the Northern Hemisphere. It is the only extant species in the family Odobenidae and genus Odobenus. This species is subdivided into two subspecies: the Atlantic walrus (O. r. rosmarus), which lives in the Atlantic Ocean, and the Pacific walrus (O. r. divergens), which lives in the Pacific Ocean.

Adult walrus are characterised by prominent tusks and whiskers, and considerable bulk; adult males in the Pacific can weigh more than 2,000 kilograms (4,400 pounds) and, among pinnipeds, are exceeded in size only by the two species of elephant seals. Walrus live mostly in shallow waters above the continental shelves, spending significant amounts of their lives on the sea ice looking for benthic bivalve molluscs. Walruses are relatively long-lived, social and intelligent animals, and are considered a keystone species of the Arctic marine region.

The walrus has played a prominent role in the cultures of many indigenous Arctic peoples, who have hunted it for meat, fat, skin, tusks, and bone. During the 19th century and the early 20th century, walrus were widely hunted for their blubber, walrus ivory, leather, and meat; in this period, the walrus population dropped rapidly all around the Arctic region. It has rebounded somewhat since, though the populations of Atlantic and Laptev walruses remain fragmented and at low levels compared with the time before human interference.

== Etymology ==
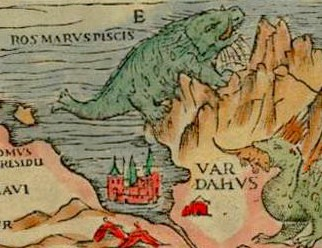
A walrus, labeled Ros marus piscis, is depicted in а 16th-century map of Scandinavia (the Carta Marina)

Despite seeming to have a Latin shape, the origin of the word walrus derives from a Germanic language, and it has been attributed largely to either Dutch or Old Norse in some form. Its first part derives from the Old Norse hvalr ('whale'), and the second part is from the Old Norse hross ('horse'). For example, the Old Norse word hrosshvalr means 'horse-whale' and is thought to have been passed in an inverted form to both Dutch and the dialects of northern Germany as walros and Walross. An alternative theory is that it comes from the Dutch words wal 'shore' and reus 'giant'.

The species name rosmarus is Scandinavian. The Norwegian manuscript Konungs skuggsjá, thought to date from around AD 1240, refers to the walrus as rosmhvalr in Iceland and rostungr in Greenland (walruses were by now extinct in Iceland and Norway, while the word evolved in Greenland). Several place names in Iceland, Greenland and Norway may originate from walrus sites: Hvalfjord, Hvallatrar and Hvalsnes to name some, all being typical walrus breeding grounds.

The archaic English word for walrus—morse—is widely thought to have come from the Slavic languages, which in turn borrowed it from Finno-Ugric languages, and ultimately (according to Ante Aikio) from an unknown Pre-Finno-Ugric substrate language of Northern Europe. Compare морж (morž) in Russian, mursu in Finnish, morša in Northern Saami, and morse in French. Olaus Magnus, who depicted the walrus in the Carta Marina in 1539, first referred to the walrus as the ros marus, probably a Latin derivation of morž, and this was adopted by Linnaeus in his binomial nomenclature.

The coincidental similarity between morse and the Latin word morsus ('a bite') supposedly contributed to the walrus's reputation as a "terrible monster".

The compound Odobenus comes from odous (Greek for 'teeth') and baino (Greek for 'walk'), based on observations of walruses using their tusks to pull themselves out of the water.

The Inuttitut term for the creature is aivik, similar to the Inuktitut word: aiviq ᐊᐃᕕᖅ.

== Taxonomy and evolution ==
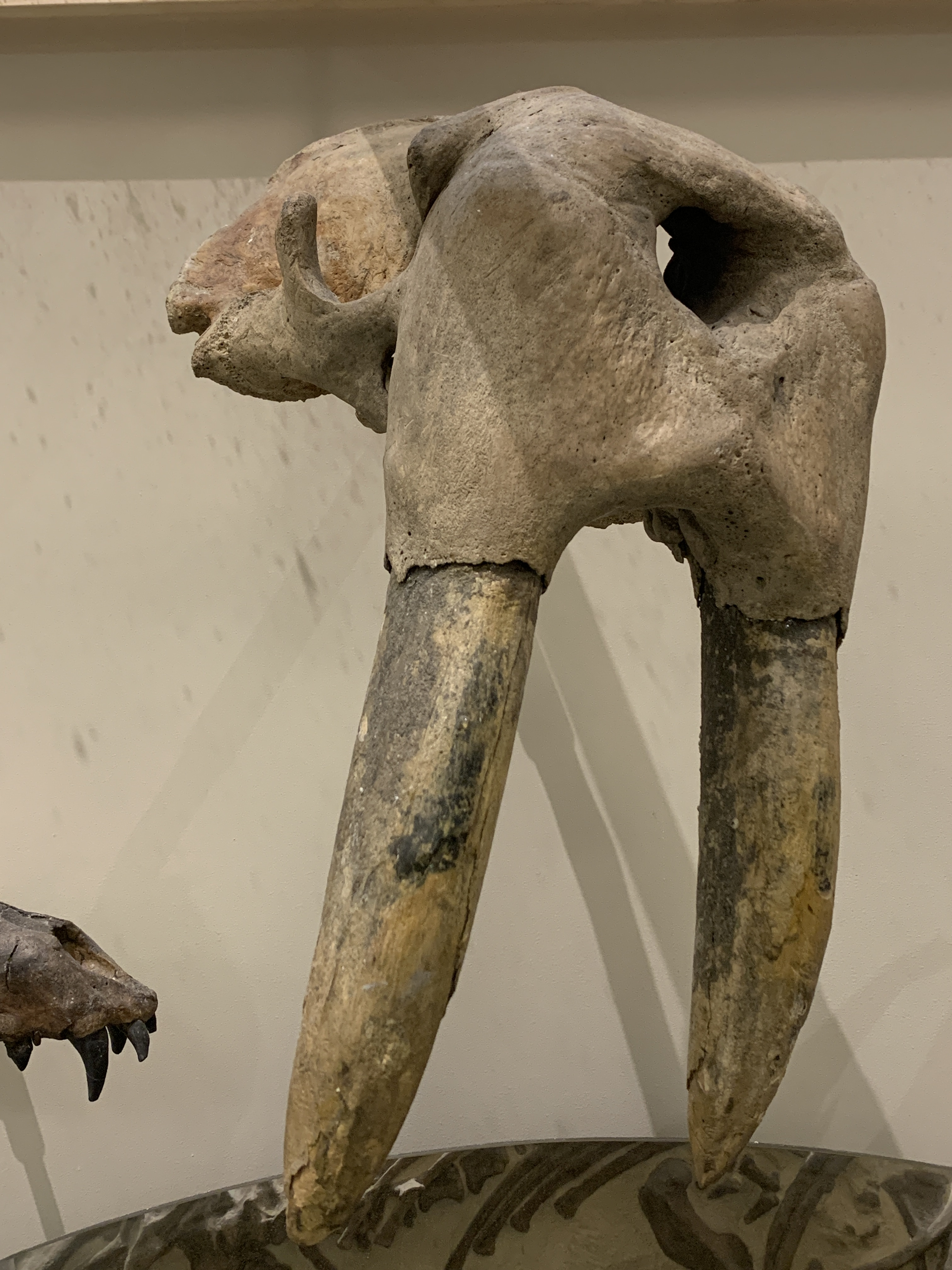
Fossil walrus (O. rosmarus) skull, collected off the coast of New Jersey in 1938. At the AMNH.

The walrus is a mammal in the order Carnivora. It is the sole surviving member of the family Odobenidae, one of three lineages in the suborder Pinnipedia along with true seals (Phocidae) and eared seals (Otariidae). While there has been some debate as to whether all three lineages are monophyletic, i.e. descended from a single ancestor, or diphyletic, recent genetic evidence suggests all three descended from a caniform ancestor most closely related to modern bears. Recent multigene analysis indicates the odobenids and otariids diverged from the phocids about 20–26 million years ago, while the odobenids and the otariids separated 15–20 million years ago. Odobenidae was once a highly diverse and widespread family, including at least twenty species in the subfamilies Imagotariinae, Dusignathinae and Odobeninae. The key distinguishing feature was the development of a squirt/suction feeding mechanism; tusks are a later feature specific to Odobeninae, of which the modern walrus is the last remaining (relict) species.

Two subspecies of walrus are widely accepted; the Atlantic walrus, O. r. rosmarus (Linnaeus, 1758), and the Pacific walrus, O. r. divergens (Illiger, 1815). Fixed genetic differences between the Atlantic and Pacific subspecies indicate very restricted gene flow, but relatively recent separation, estimated at 500,000 and 785,000 years ago. These dates coincide with the hypothesis derived from fossils that the walrus evolved from a tropical or subtropical ancestor that became isolated in the Atlantic Ocean and gradually adapted to colder conditions in the Arctic.

The modern walrus is mostly known from Arctic regions, but a substantial breeding population occurred on isolated Sable Island, 100 mi (160 km) southeast of Nova Scotia and 500 mi (800 km) due east of Portland, Maine, until the early Colonial period. Abundant walrus remains have also been recovered from the southern North Sea dating to the Eemian interglacial period, when that region would have been submerged as it is today, unlike the intervening glacial lowstand when the shallow North Sea was dry land. Fossils known from San Francisco, Vancouver, and the Atlantic US coast as far south as North Carolina have been referred to glacial periods.

An isolated population in the Laptev Sea was considered by some authorities, including many Russian biologists and the canonical Mammal Species of the World, to be a third subspecies, O. r. laptevi (Chapskii, 1940), but has since been determined to be of Pacific walrus origin.

== Anatomy ==
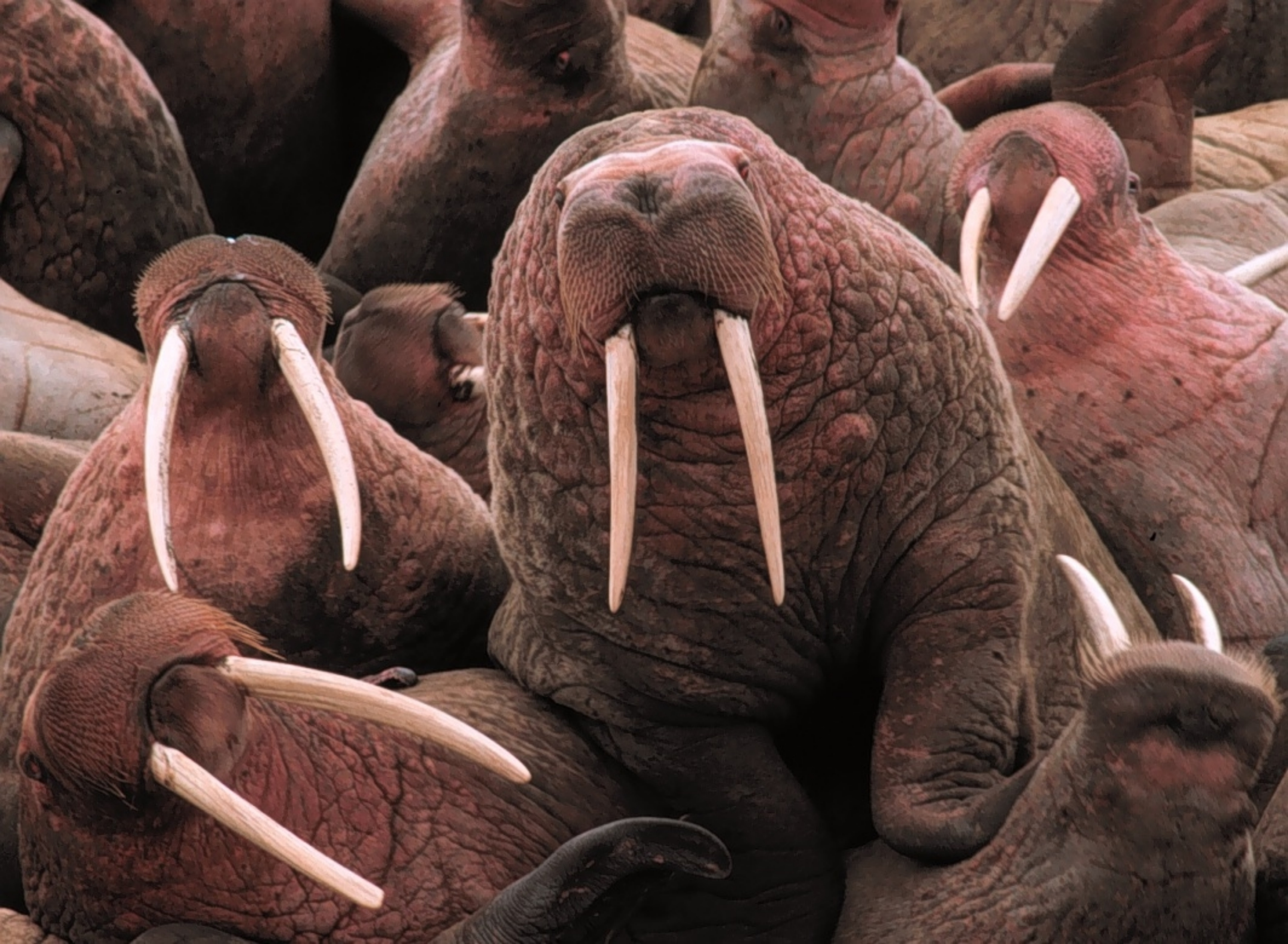
Young male Pacific walruses on Cape Pierce, Alaska, showing variation in the curvature and orientation of the tusks and the bumpy skin (bosses) typical of males.

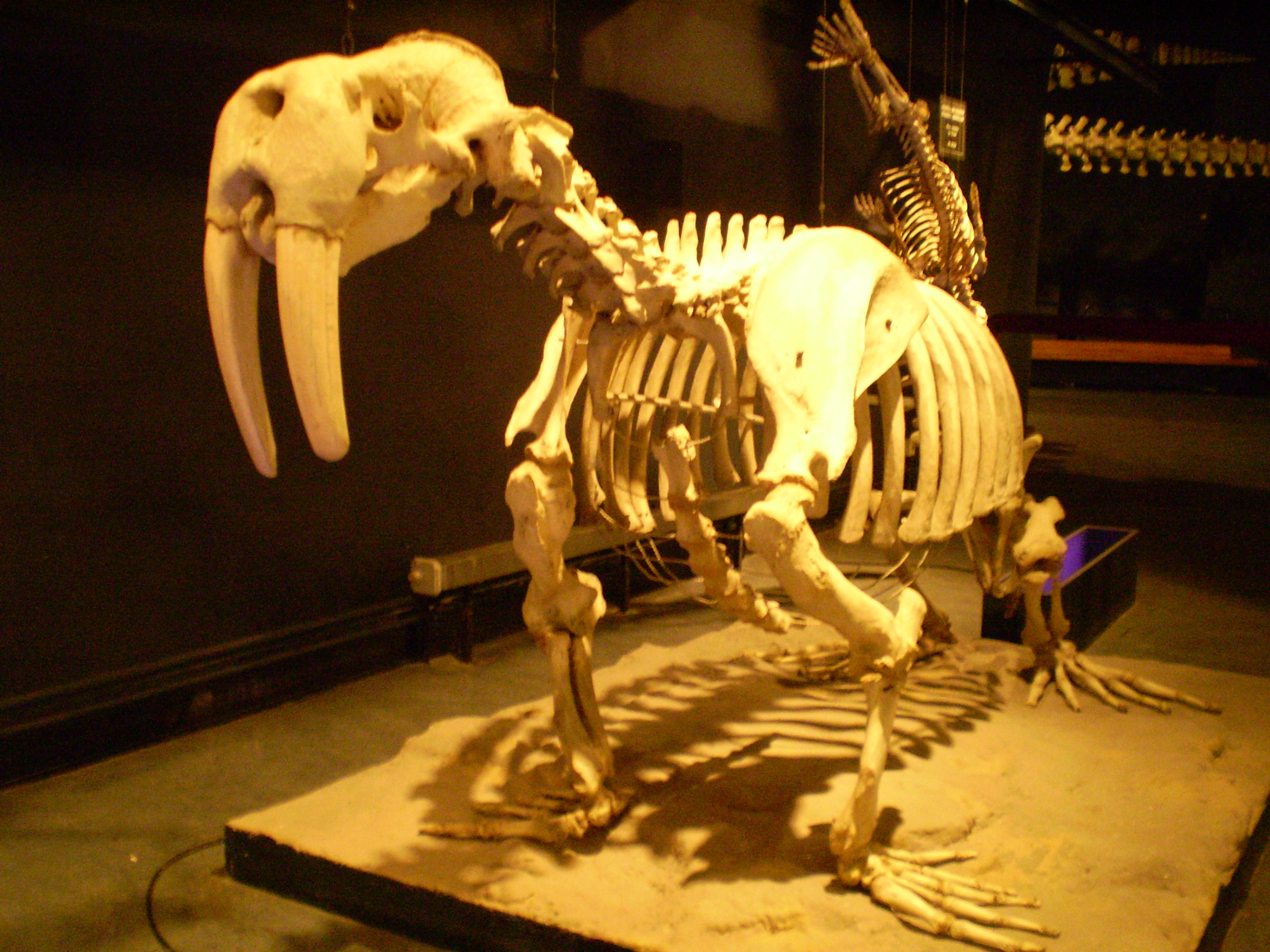
Skeleton

While some outsized Pacific males can weigh as much as 2,000 kg (4,400 lb), most weigh between 800 and 1,700 kg (1,800 and 3,700 lb). An occasional male of the Pacific subspecies far exceeds normal dimensions. In 1909, a walrus hide weighing 500 kg (1,100 lb) was collected from an enormous bull in Franz Josef Land, while in August 1910, Jack Woodson shot a 4.9-metre-long (16 ft) walrus, harvesting its 450 kg (1,000 lb) hide. Since a walrus's hide usually accounts for about 20% of its body weight, the total body mass of these two giants is estimated to have been at least 2,300 kg (5,000 lb). However, in a 2015 study examining the sizes of large marine animals, McClain and colleagues found that both of the former records were difficult to verify, and that the maximum weight recorded was a male measuring 3.8 m (12 ft 6 in) in length and 1,883 kg (4,151 lb), and a maximum length of 3.95 m (13.0 ft) were considered the most reliable and accurately measured individuals. The Atlantic subspecies weighs about 10–20% less than the Pacific subspecies. Male Atlantic walrus weigh an average of 900 kg (2,000 lb). The Atlantic walrus also tends to have relatively shorter tusks and somewhat more of a flattened snout. Females weigh about two-thirds as much as males, with the Atlantic females averaging 560 kg (1,230 lb), sometimes weighing as little as 400 kg (880 lb), and the Pacific female averaging 800 kg (1,800 lb). Length typically ranges from 2.2 to 3.5 m (7 ft 3 in to 11 ft 6 in). Newborn walruses are already quite large, averaging 33 to 85 kg (73 to 187 lb) in weight and 1 to 1.4 m (3 ft 3 in to 4 ft 7 in) in length across both sexes and subspecies. Overall, the walrus is the third largest pinniped species, surpassed in size only by the southern and northern elephant seals. Walruses maintain such a high body weight because of the blubber stored underneath their skin. This blubber keeps them warm and the fat provides energy to the walrus.

The walrus's body shape shares features with both sea lions (eared seals: Otariidae) and seals (true seals: Phocidae). As with otariids, it can turn its rear flippers forward and move on all fours; however, its swimming technique is more like that of true seals, relying less on flippers and more on sinuous whole body movements. Also like phocids, it lacks external ears.

The extraocular muscles of the walrus are well-developed. This and its lack of orbital roof allow it to protrude its eyes and see in both a frontal and dorsal direction. However, vision in this species appears to be more suited for short-range.

=== Tusks and dentition ===
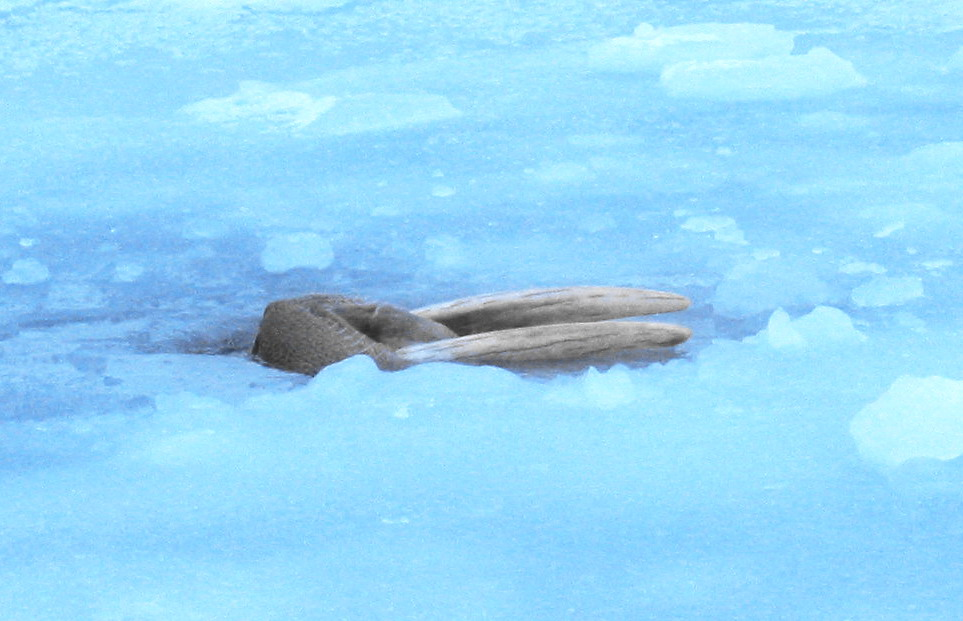
Walrus using its tusks to hang on a breathing hole in the ice near St. Lawrence Island, Bering Sea

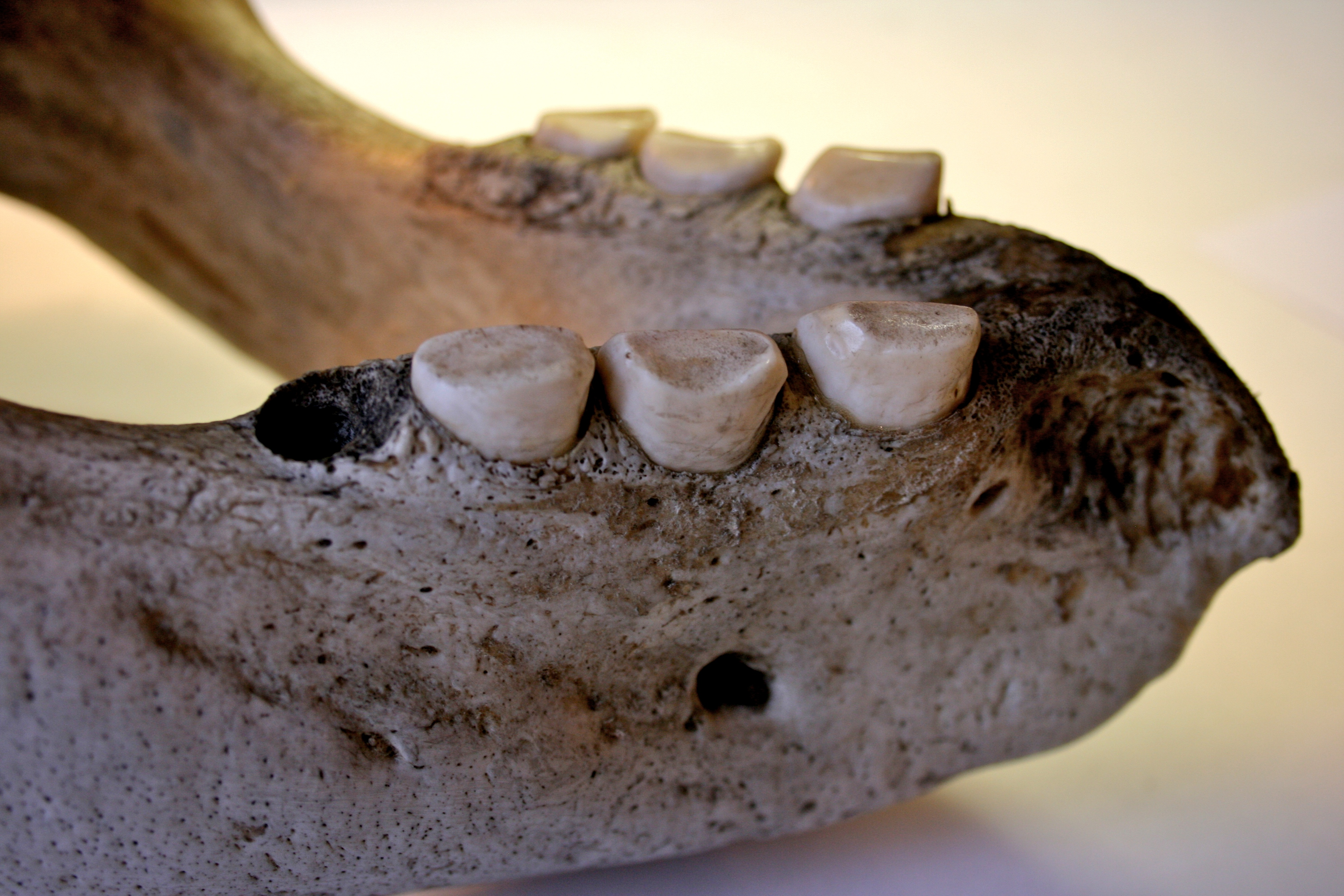
Teeth

Although some extinct species of walrus did not have long tusks, they are the most prominent feature of the living species. Tusks are elongated canines that are present in both male and female walruses and can reach a length of 1 m (3 ft 3 in) and weigh up to 5.4 kg (12 lb). They are slightly longer and thicker in males, who use them for fighting, dominance, and display. The strongest males with the largest tusks typically dominate social groups. Tusks are also used to form and maintain holes in the ice and aid the walrus in climbing out of water onto ice. Tusks were once thought to be used to dig out prey from the seabed, but analyses of abrasion patterns on the tusks indicate they are dragged through the sediment while the upper edge of the snout is used for digging. The dentition of walruses is highly variable, but they normally have relatively few teeth other than their tusks. The maximal number of teeth is 38 with dentition formula: 3.1.4.23.1.3.2, but over half of the teeth are rudimentary and occur with less than 50% frequency, such that a typical dentition includes only 18 teeth 1.1.3.00.1.3.0

=== Vibrissae (whiskers) ===
Surrounding the tusks is a broad mat of stiff bristles ("mystacial vibrissae"), giving the walrus a characteristic whiskered appearance, bestowing the namesake of the walrus moustache. There can be 400 to 700 vibrissae in 13 to 15 rows reaching 30 cm (12 in) in length, though in the wild they are often worn to much shorter lengths due to constant use in foraging. The vibrissae are attached to muscles and are supplied with blood and nerves, making them highly sensitive organs capable of differentiating shapes 3 mm (1/8 in) thick and 2 mm (3/32 in) wide.

=== Skin ===
Aside from the vibrissae, the walrus is sparsely covered with fur and appears bald. Its skin is highly wrinkled and thick, up to 10 cm (4 in) around the neck and shoulders of males. The blubber layer beneath is up to 15 cm (6 in) thick. Young walruses are deep brown and grow paler and more cinnamon-colored as they age. Old males, in particular, become nearly pink. Because skin blood vessels constrict in cold water, the walrus can appear almost white when swimming. As a secondary sexual characteristic, males also acquire significant nodules, called "bosses", particularly around the neck and shoulders.

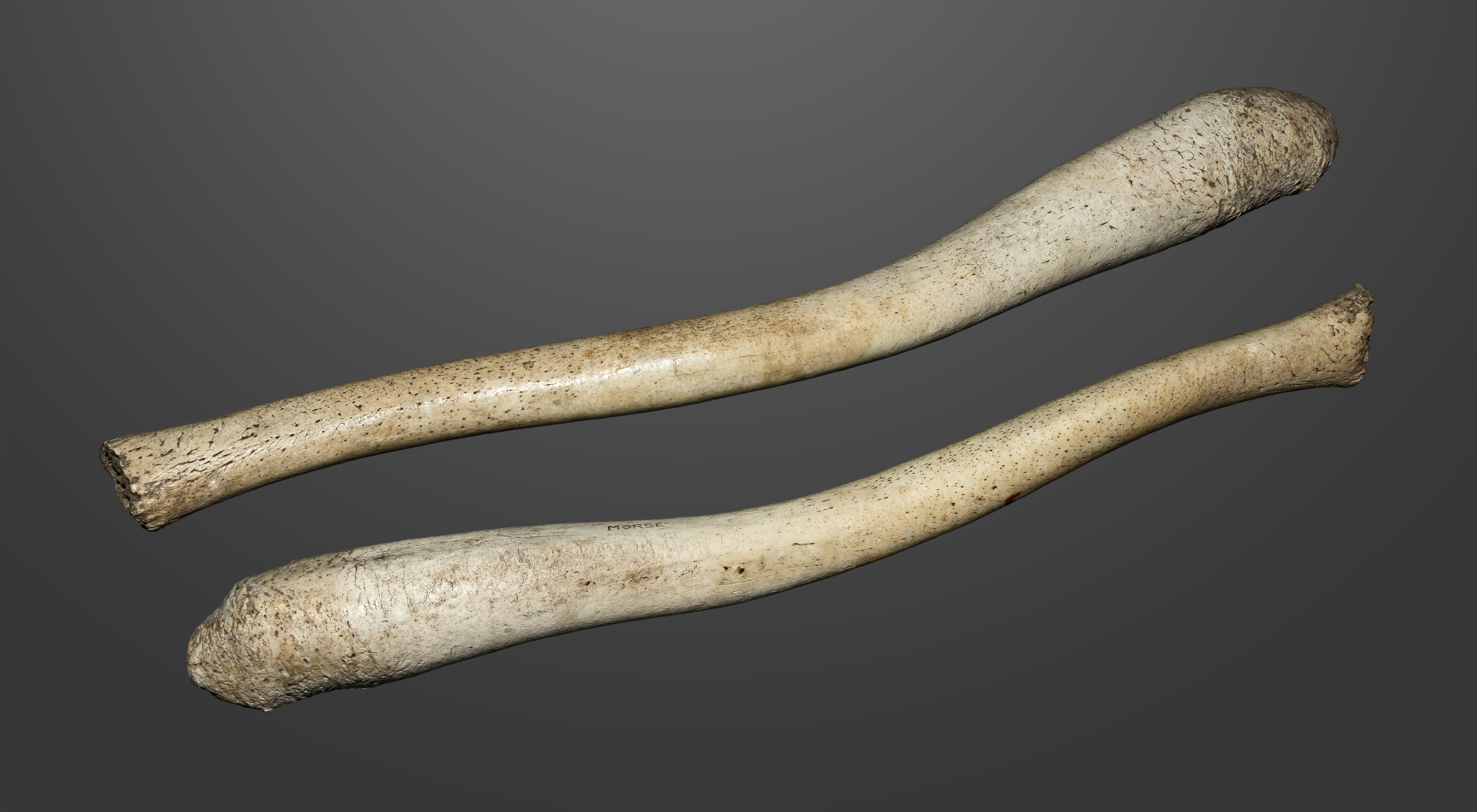
Walrus baculums

The walrus has an air sac under its throat which acts like a flotation bubble and allows it to bob vertically in the water and sleep. The males possess a large baculum (penis bone), up to 63 cm (25 in) in length, the largest of any land mammal, both in absolute size and relative to body size.

== Life history ==
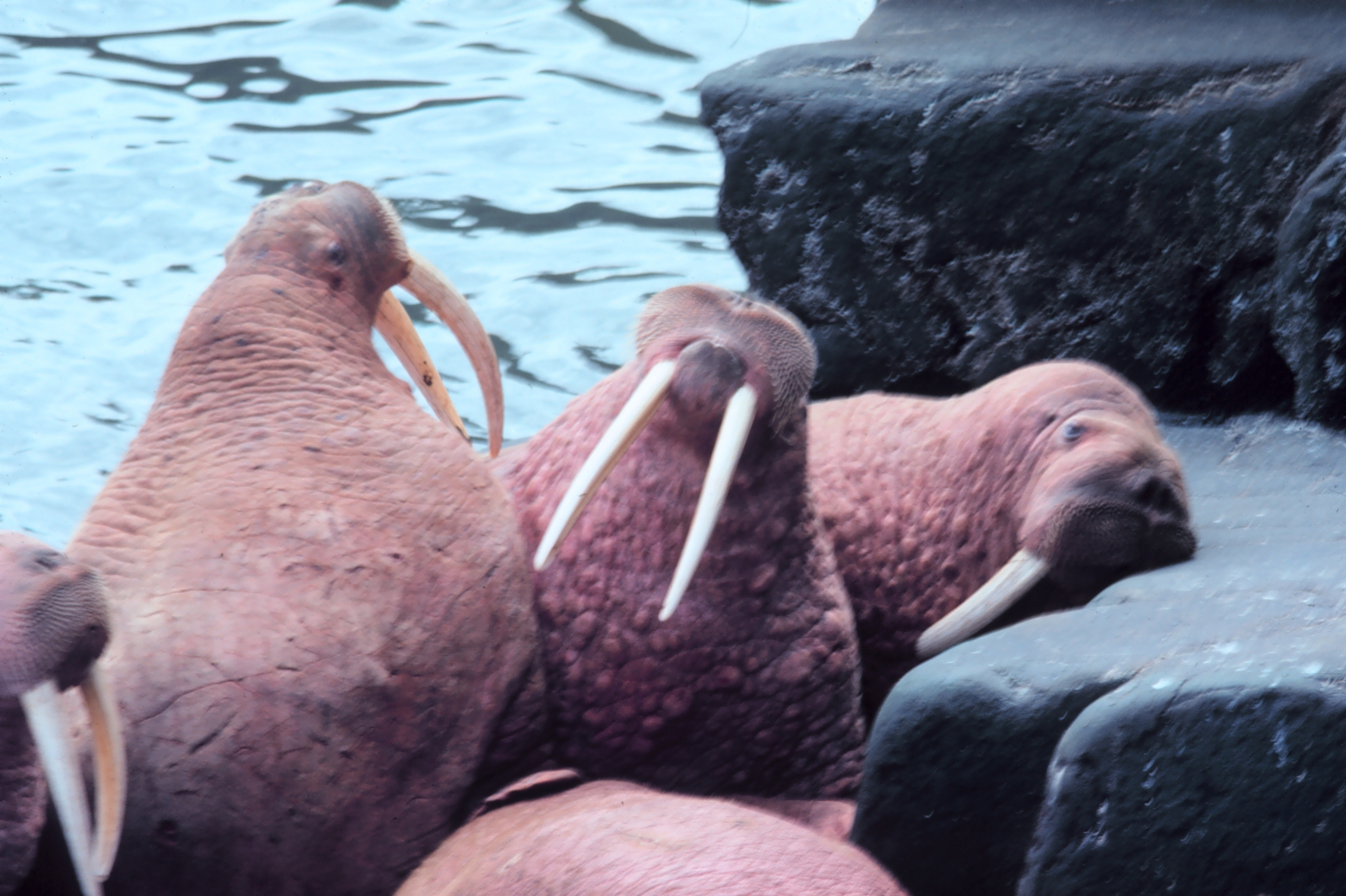
Walruses fighting

=== Reproduction ===
Walruses live to about 20–30 years old in the wild. The oldest-living walrus on record was Slowpoke, a captive walrus at SeaWorld Orlando, who lived to be 49 years old when he died. The males reach sexual maturity as early as 7 years, but do not typically mate until fully developed at around 15 years of age. They rut from January through April, decreasing their food intake dramatically. The females begin ovulating as soon as 4-6 years old. Females reach physical maturity at 10–12 years of age, and males at 15–16 years of age. The females are diestrous, coming into heat in late summer and around February, yet the males are fertile only around February; the potential fertility of this second period is unknown. Breeding occurs from January to March, peaking in February. Males aggregate in the water around ice-bound groups of estrous females and engage in competitive vocal displays. The females join them and copulate in the water.

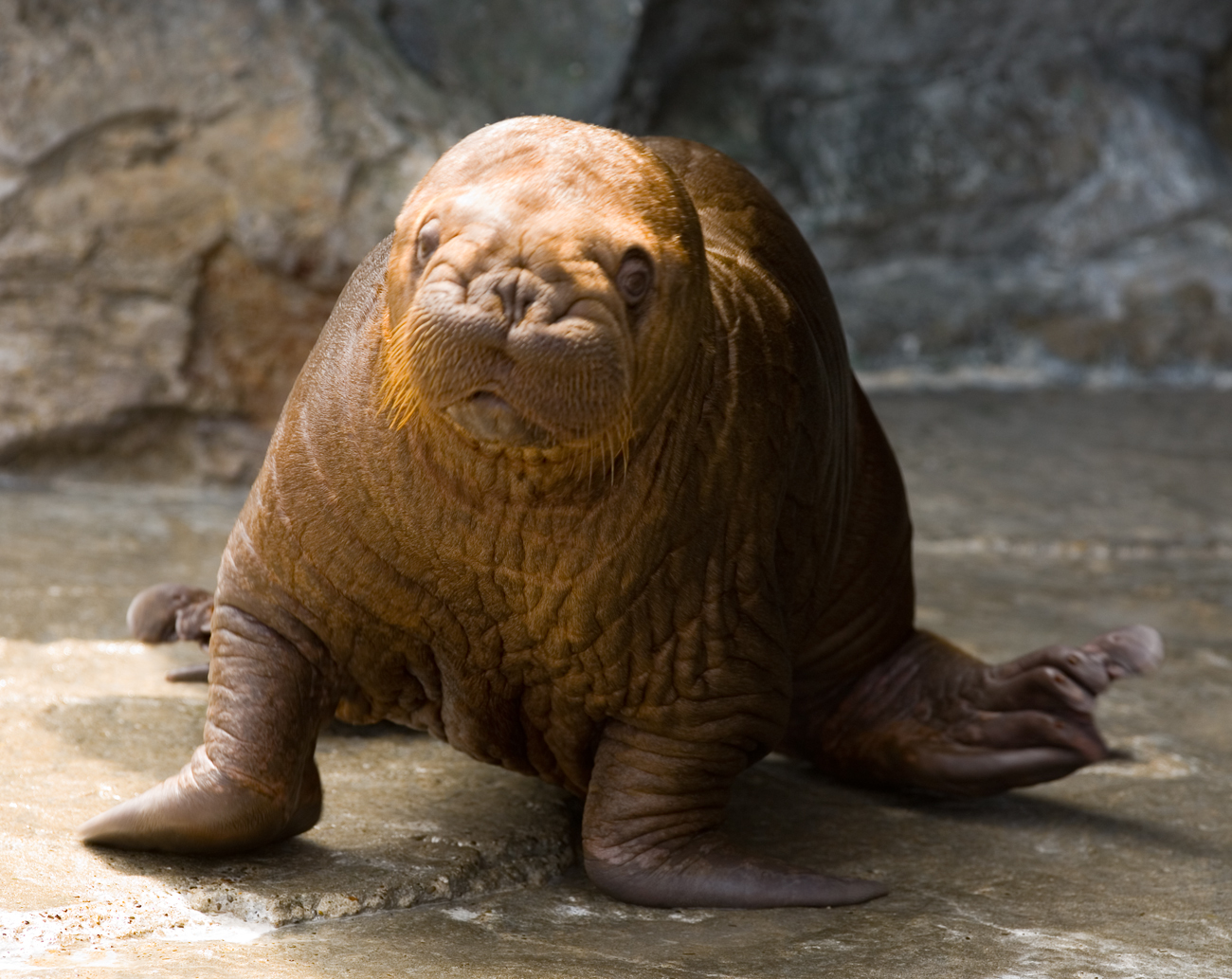
A walrus pup at Kamogawa Seaworld, Japan

Gestation lasts 15 to 16 months. The first three to four months are spent with the blastula in suspended development before it implants itself in the uterus. This strategy of delayed implantation, common among pinnipeds, presumably evolved to optimize both the mating season and the birthing season, determined by ecological conditions that promote newborn survival. Calves are born during the spring migration, from April to June. They weigh 45 to 75 kg (99 to 165 lb) at birth and are able to swim. The mothers nurse for over a year before weaning, but the young can spend up to five years with the mothers. Walrus milk contains higher amounts of fats and protein compared to land animals but lower compared to phocid seals. This lower fat content in turn causes a slower growth rate among calves and a longer nursing investment for their mothers. Young may be suckled at sea as well as during long haul-outs, making walrus the only pinnipeds that exhibit aquatic suckling. Because ovulation is suppressed until the calf is weaned, females give birth at most every two years, leaving the walrus with the lowest reproductive rate of any pinniped. Male walruses may help inexperienced young as they learn to swim, and have even been recorded caring for orphans. When a group is threatened, all the adults may protect the young.

=== Migration ===
The rest of the year (late summer and fall), walruses tend to form massive aggregations of tens of thousands of individuals on rocky beaches or outcrops. The migration between the ice and the beach can be long-distance and dramatic. In late spring and summer, for example, several hundred thousand Pacific walruses migrate from the Bering Sea into the Chukchi Sea through the relatively narrow Bering Strait.

=== Vagrancy ===
Walrus are prone to long-distance vagrancy, particularly southwards from their current range. Between 1815 and 1954, 25 were recorded in Scotland, one in England, and one in Ireland, with a further six in Scotland and one in England from 1955 to 1986. They are more regular along the mainland Norwegian coast (not counting Svalbard, where they are resident), with 31 between 1900 and 1967.

More recently, walrus records across western Europe have attracted considerable publicity, attracting large crowds of people to see them and extensive press coverage; the individual animals often receiving popular names and being tracked over their extensive travels as the individuals are recognisable from scars, and details of tusk size. The following vagrant individuals have been named:

- 'Wally'. Male. First sighted at Valentia Island, Ireland, in March 2021, then moving the Pembrokeshire coast in Wales, and on to western France and Bilbao in Spain, then back north to Isles of Scilly and a return visit to Ireland, and finally north to Iceland.
- 'Freya'. Female; five years old. First sighted in the northern North Sea in 2019, but not named until appearing in the Netherlands in October 2021. Then at multiple sites in the North Sea, until 13 August 2022 when shot near Oslo in Norway.
- 'Stena'. Female; estimated over 20 years old. First seen at Vigra near Ålesund on the west coast of Norway in March 2022, and then via Denmark and southwest Sweden to the Baltic Sea at Rügen, Germany in June 2022, then multiple sites in the Baltic Sea, finally in Kymenlaakso, Finland, in 2022; the first record of a walrus in the northern Baltic Sea. Healthy at first, it was unable to find adequate food in the Baltic; it became emaciated, and died when rescuers tried to transport it for treatment.
- 'Thor'. Male; about 8 years old. First seen on 6 November 2022 in the Netherlands, then moving west to Britanny in northern France, then across the English Channel to England, then moving north up the English east coast to Northumberland on 2 January 2023, then returning to the Arctic, last seen at Breiðdalsvík, Iceland on 24 February 2023.

== Ecology ==
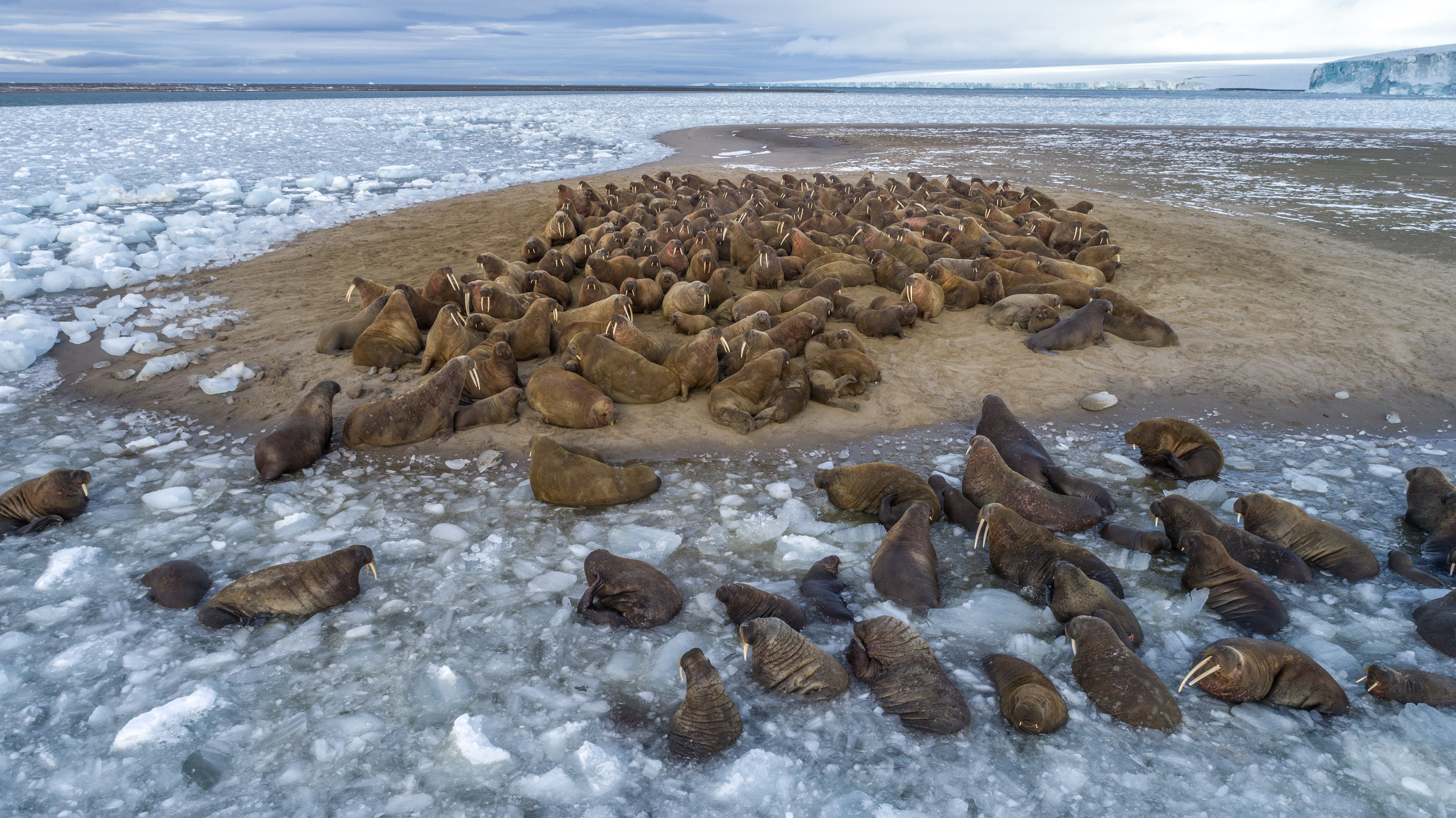
A herd of walruses on Northbrook Island, Franz Josef Land, Russia

=== Range and habitat ===
The majority of the population of the Pacific walrus spends its summers north of the Bering Strait in the Chukchi Sea of the Arctic Ocean along the northern coast of eastern Siberia, around Wrangel Island, in the Beaufort Sea along the northern shore of Alaska south to Unimak Island, and in the waters between those locations. Smaller numbers of males summer in the Gulf of Anadyr on the southern coast of the Siberian Chukchi Peninsula, and in Bristol Bay off the southern coast of Alaska, west of the Alaska Peninsula. In the spring and fall, walruses congregate throughout the Bering Strait, reaching from the western coast of Alaska to the Gulf of Anadyr. They winter over in the Bering Sea along the eastern coast of Siberia south to the northern part of the Kamchatka Peninsula, and along the southern coast of Alaska. A 28,000-year-old fossil walrus was dredged up from the bottom of San Francisco Bay, indicating that Pacific walruses ranged that far south during the last Ice Age.

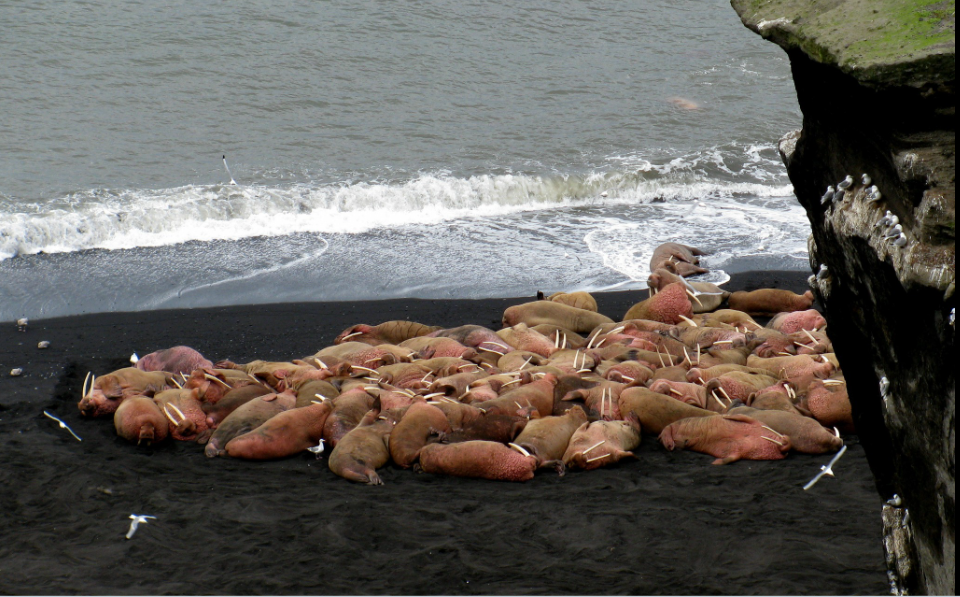
Herd resting on a beach, Alaska.

Commercial harvesting reduced the population of the Pacific walrus to between 50,000 and 100,000 in the 1950s–1960s. Limits on commercial hunting allowed the population to increase to a peak in the 1970s-1980s, but subsequently, walrus numbers have again declined. Early aerial censuses of Pacific walrus conducted at five-year intervals between 1975 and 1985 estimated populations of above 220,000 in each of the three surveys. As of 2018, the global walrus population is estimated to be 112,500 mature individuals.

In 2006, the population of the Pacific walrus was estimated to be around 129,000 on the basis of an aerial census combined with satellite tracking. There were roughly 200,000 Pacific walruses in 1990.

The much smaller population of Atlantic walruses ranges from the Canadian Arctic, across Greenland, Svalbard, and the western part of Arctic Russia. There are eight hypothetical subpopulations of Atlantic walruses, based largely on their geographical distribution and movements: five west of Greenland and three east of Greenland. The Atlantic walrus once ranged south to Sable Island, off of Nova Scotia; as late as the 18th century, they could be found in large numbers in the Greater Gulf of St. Lawrence region, sometimes in colonies of 7-8,000 individuals. This population was nearly eradicated by commercial harvest; their current numbers, though difficult to estimate, probably remain below 20,000. In April 2006, the Canadian Species at Risk Act listed the populations of northwestern Atlantic walrus in Québec, New Brunswick, Nova Scotia, Newfoundland and Labrador as having been eradicated in Canada. A genetically distinct population existed in Iceland that was wiped out after Norse settlement around 1213–1330 AD.

An isolated population is restricted, year-round, to the central and western regions of the Laptev Sea, from the eastern Kara Sea to the westernmost regions of the East Siberian Sea. The current population of these Laptev walruses has been estimated at between 5-10,000.

Even though walruses can dive to depths beyond 500 meters, they spend most of their time in shallow waters (and the nearby ice floes) hunting for bivalves.

=== Diet ===
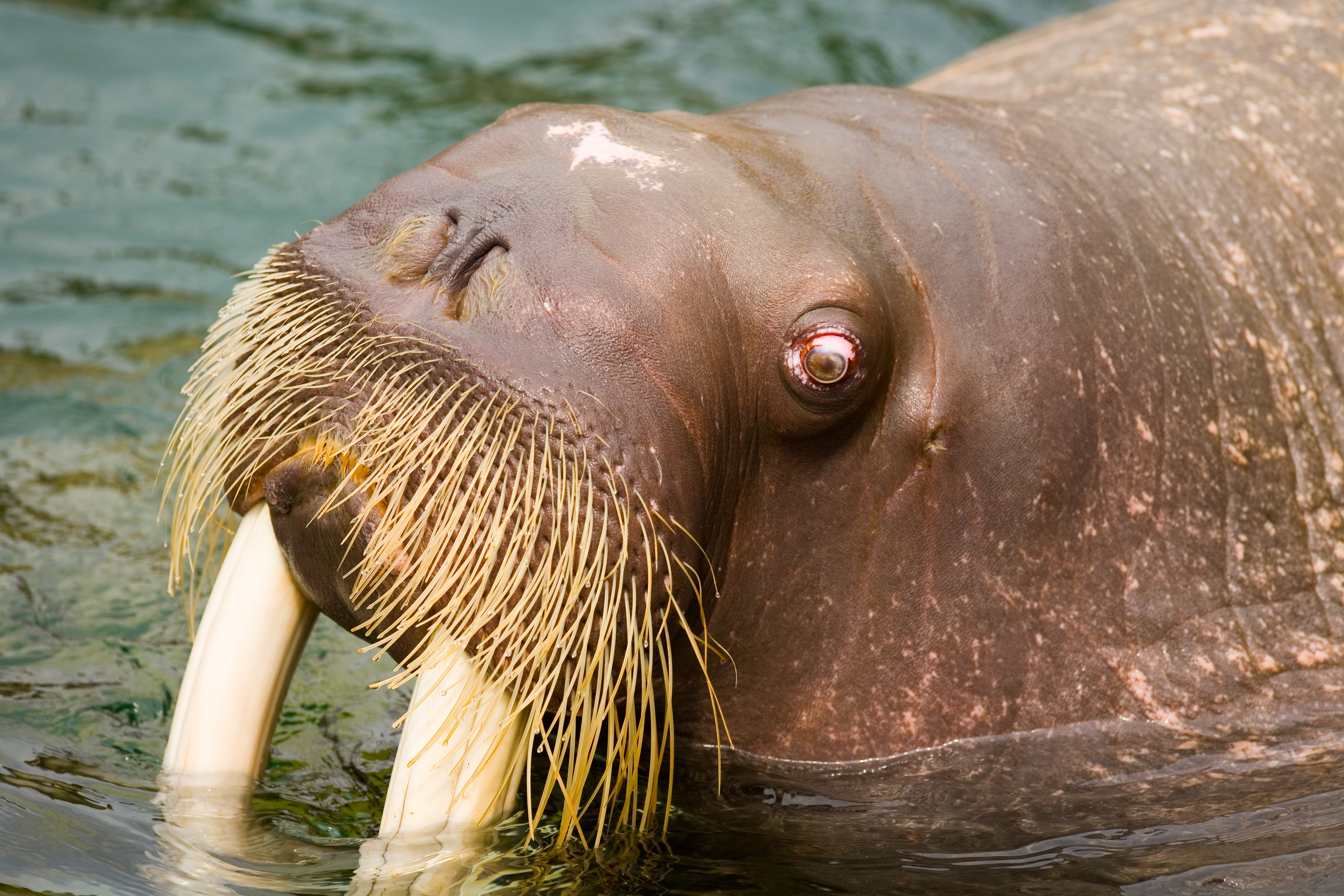
Vibrissae of a captive walrus (Japan)

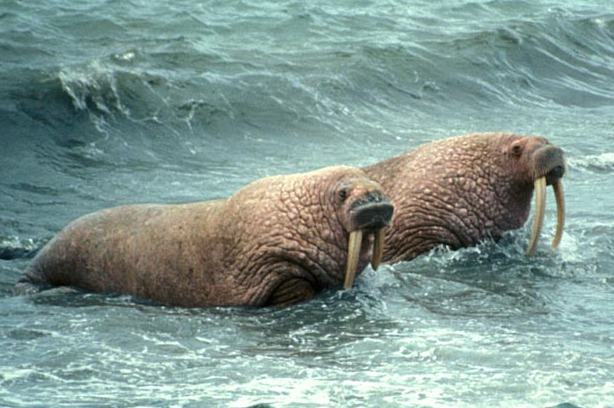
Walruses leaving the water

Walruses prefer shallow shelf regions and forage primarily on the sea floor, often from sea ice platforms. They are not particularly deep divers compared to other pinnipeds; the deepest dives in a study of Atlantic walrus near Svalbard were only 31 ± 17 m (102 ± 56 ft). However, a more recent study recorded dives exceeding 500 metres (1,600 ft) in Smith Sound, between NW Greenland and Arctic Canada – in general, peak dive depth can be expected to depend on prey distribution and seabed depth.

The walrus has a diverse and opportunistic diet, feeding on more than 60 genera of marine organisms, including shrimp, crabs, priapulids, spoon worms, tube worms, soft corals, tunicates, sea cucumbers, various mollusks (such as snails, octopuses, and squid), some types of slow-moving fish, and even parts of other pinnipeds. However, it prefers benthic bivalve mollusks, especially clams, for which it forages by grazing along the sea bottom, searching and identifying prey with its sensitive vibrissae and clearing the murky bottoms with jets of water and active flipper movements. The walrus sucks the meat out by sealing its powerful lips to the organism and withdrawing its piston-like tongue rapidly into its mouth, creating a vacuum. The walrus palate is uniquely vaulted, enabling effective suction; researchers measured pressures in the oral cavity as low as -87.9 kPa in air, and -118.8 kPa underwater. Walruses at the Tierpark Hagenbeck were easily able to suck the five-pound (2.3 kg) metal plug out of the bottom of their pool, at a water depth of 1.1 metres. The diet of the Pacific walrus consist almost exclusively of benthic invertebrates (97 percent).

Aside from the large numbers of organisms actually consumed by the walrus, its foraging has a large peripheral impact on benthic communities. It disturbs (bioturbates) the sea floor, releasing nutrients into the water column, encouraging mixing and movement of many organisms and increasing the patchiness of the benthos.

Seal tissue has been observed in a fairly significant proportion of walrus stomachs in the Pacific, but the importance of seals in the walrus diet is under debate. There have been isolated observations of walruses preying on seals up to the size of a 200 kg (440 lb) bearded seal. Rarely, incidents of walruses preying on seabirds, particularly the Brünnich's guillemot (Uria lomvia), have been documented. Walruses may occasionally prey on ice-entrapped narwhals and scavenge on whale carcasses but there is little evidence to prove this.

=== Predators ===
Due to its great size and tusks, the walrus has only two natural predators: the orca and the polar bear. The walrus does not, however, comprise a significant component of either of these predators' diets. Both the orca and the polar bear are also most likely to prey on walrus calves. Polar bears often hunt walrus by rushing at beached aggregations and consuming the individuals crushed or wounded in the sudden exodus, typically younger or infirm animals. The bears also isolate walruses when they overwinter and are unable to escape a charging bear due to inaccessible diving holes in the ice. However, even an injured walrus is a formidable opponent for a polar bear, and direct attacks are rare. Armed with its ivory tusks, walruses have been known to fatally injure polar bears in battles if the latter follows the other into the water, where the bear is at a disadvantage. Polar bear–walrus battles are often extremely protracted and exhausting, and bears have been known to break away from the attack after injuring a walrus. Orcas regularly attack walruses, although walruses are believed to have successfully defended themselves via counterattack against the larger cetacean. However, orcas have been observed successfully attacking walruses with few or no injuries.

== Relationship with humans ==
=== Conservation ===
Traditional hunters used all parts of the walrus. The meat, often preserved, is an important winter nutrition source; the flippers are fermented and stored as a delicacy until spring; tusks and bone were historically used for tools, as well as material for handicrafts; the oil was rendered for warmth and light; the tough hide made rope and house and boat coverings; and the intestines and gut linings made waterproof parkas. While some of these uses have faded with access to alternative technologies, walrus meat remains an important part of local diets, and tusk carving and engraving remain a vital art form.

In the 18th and 19th centuries, the walrus was heavily exploited by American and European sealers and whalers, leading to the near-extinction of the Atlantic subspecies. As early as 1871 traditional hunters were expressing concern about the numbers of walrus being hunted by whaling fleets. Commercial walrus harvesting is now outlawed throughout its range, although Chukchi, Yupik and Inuit peoples are permitted to kill small numbers towards the end of each summer.

According to Adolf Erik Nordenskiöld, European hunters and Arctic explorers found walrus meat not particularly tasty, and only ate it in case of necessity; however walrus tongue was a delicacy.

Walrus hunts are regulated by resource managers in Russia, the United States, Canada, and Greenland, and by representatives of the respective hunting communities. An estimated 4000–7000 Pacific walruses are harvested in Alaska and in Russia, including a significant portion (about 42%) of struck and lost animals. Several hundred are removed annually around Greenland. The sustainability of these levels of harvest is difficult to determine given uncertain population estimates and parameters such as fecundity and mortality. The Boone and Crockett Big Game Record book has entries for Atlantic and Pacific walrus. The recorded largest tusks are just over 30 inches and 37 inches long respectively.

The effects of global climate change are another element of concern. The extent and thickness of the pack ice has reached unusually low levels in several recent years. The walrus relies on this ice while giving birth and aggregating in the reproductive period. Thinner pack ice over the Bering Sea has reduced the amount of resting habitat near optimal feeding grounds. This more widely separates lactating females from their calves, increasing nutritional stress for the young and lower reproductive rates. Reduced coastal sea ice has also been implicated in the increase of stampeding deaths crowding the shorelines of the Chukchi Sea between eastern Russia and western Alaska. Analysis of trends in ice cover published in 2012 indicate that Pacific walrus populations are likely to continue to decline for the foreseeable future, and shift further north, but that careful conservation management might be able to limit these effects.

Currently, two of the three walrus subspecies are listed as least concern by the IUCN, while the third is data deficient. The Pacific walrus is not listed as depleted according to the Marine Mammal Protection Act nor as threatened or endangered under the Endangered Species Act. The Russian Atlantic and Laptev Sea populations are classified as Category 2 (decreasing) and Category 3 (rare) in the Russian Red Book. Global trade in walrus ivory is restricted according to a CITES Appendix III listing. In October 2017, the Center for Biological Diversity announced they would sue the U.S. Fish and Wildlife Service to force it to classify the Pacific Walrus as a threatened or endangered species.

In 1952, walruses in Svalbard were nearly gone due to ivory hunting over a 300-year period, but the Norwegian government banned their commercial hunting and the walruses began to repopulate. By 2018, the population had increased to an estimated 5,503 walruses in the Svalbard area.

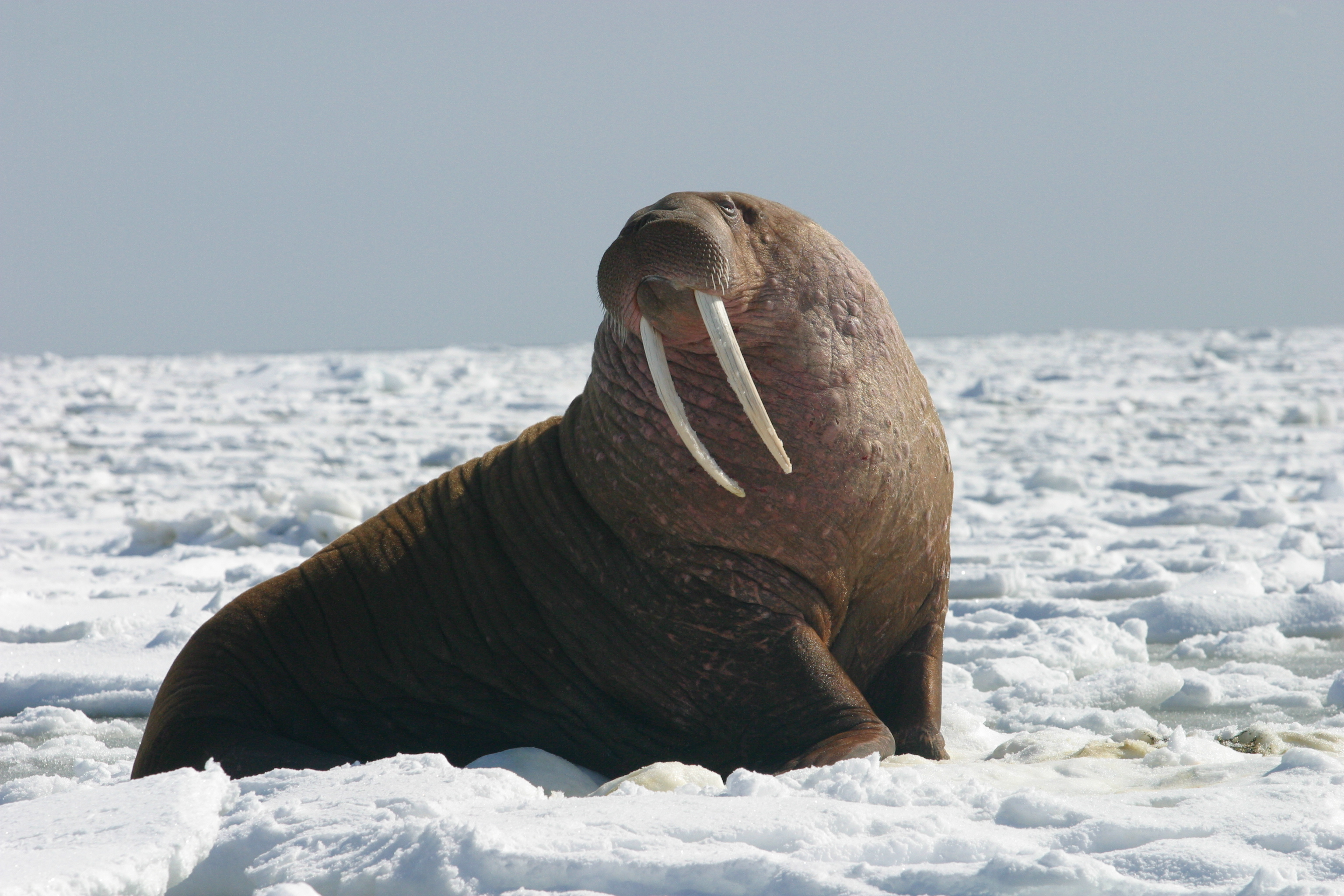
Male Pacific Walrus, Alaska

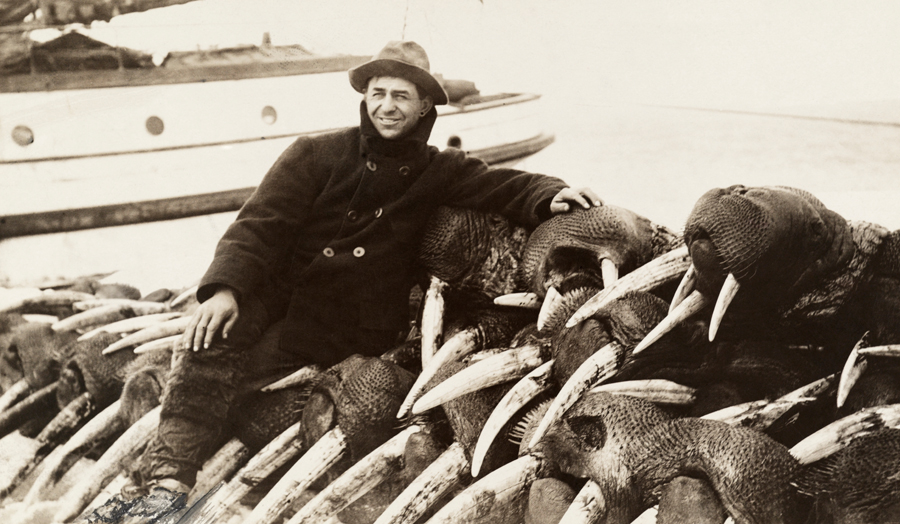
Hunter sitting on dozens of walruses killed for their tusks, 1911

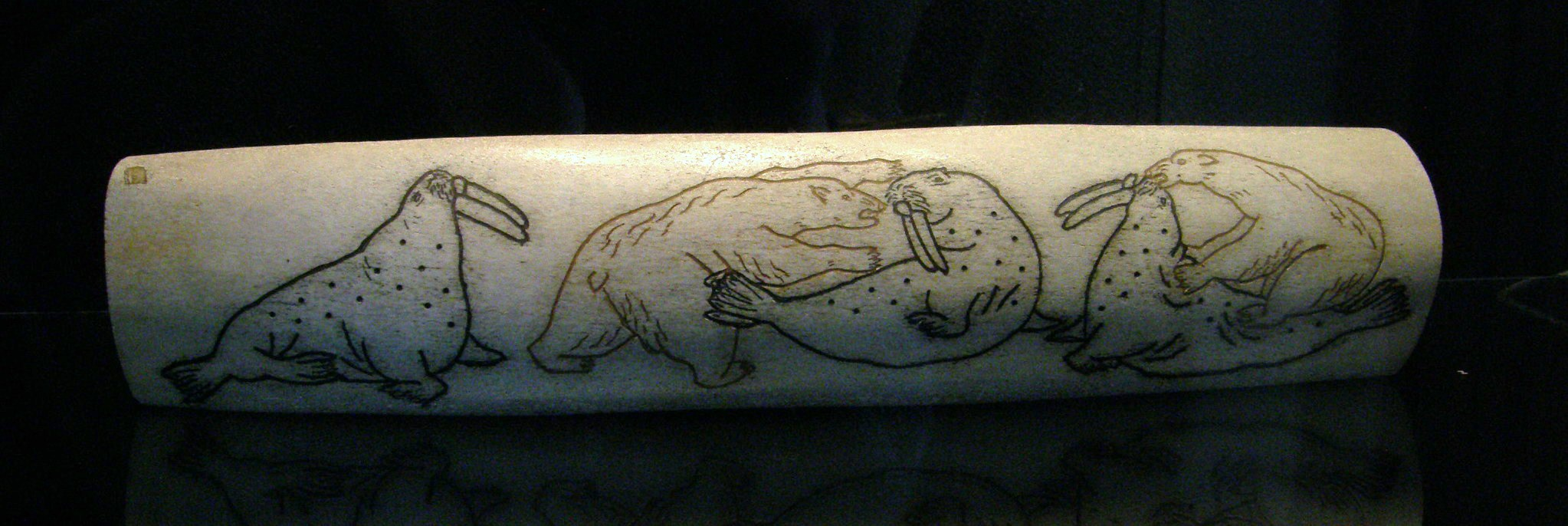
Walrus tusk scrimshaw made by Chukchi artisans depicting polar bears attacking walruses, on display in the Magadan Regional Museum, Magadan, Russia

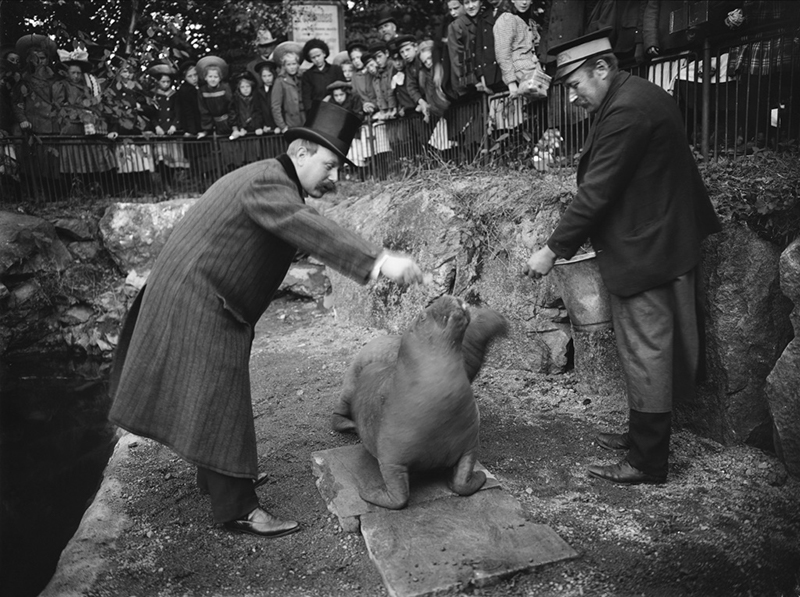
Walrus being fed at Skansen in Stockholm, Sweden, 1908

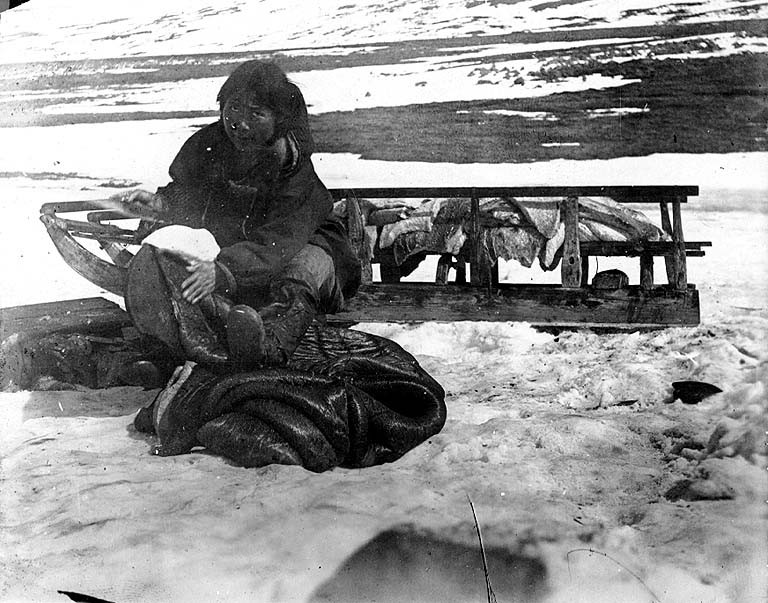
Native Alaskan woman dresses walrus skin

=== Culture ===
==== Folklore ====
The walrus plays an important role in the religion and folklore of many Arctic peoples. Skin and bone are used in some ceremonies, and the animal appears frequently in legends. For example, in a Chukchi version of the widespread myth of the Raven, in which Raven recovers the sun and the moon from an evil spirit by seducing his daughter, the angry father throws the daughter from a high cliff and, as she drops into the water, she turns into a walrus. According to various legends, the tusks are formed either by the trails of mucus from the weeping girl or her long braids. This myth is possibly related to the Chukchi myth of the old walrus-headed woman who rules the bottom of the sea, who is in turn linked to the Inuit goddess Sedna. Both in Chukotka and Alaska, the aurora borealis is believed to be a special world inhabited by those who died by violence, the changing rays representing deceased souls playing ball with a walrus head.

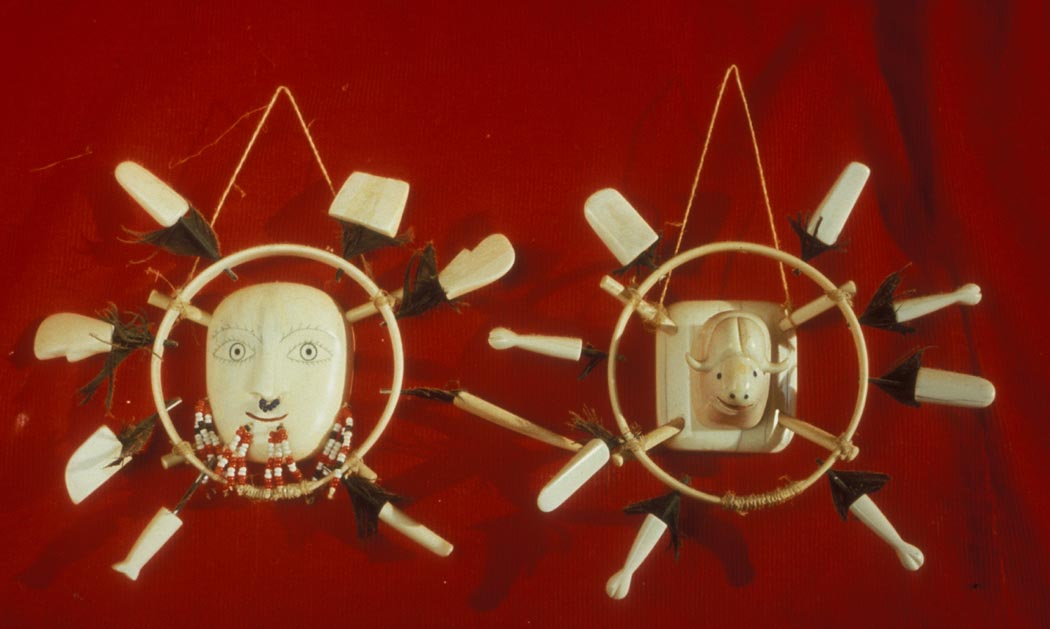
Walrus ivory masks made by Yupik in Alaska

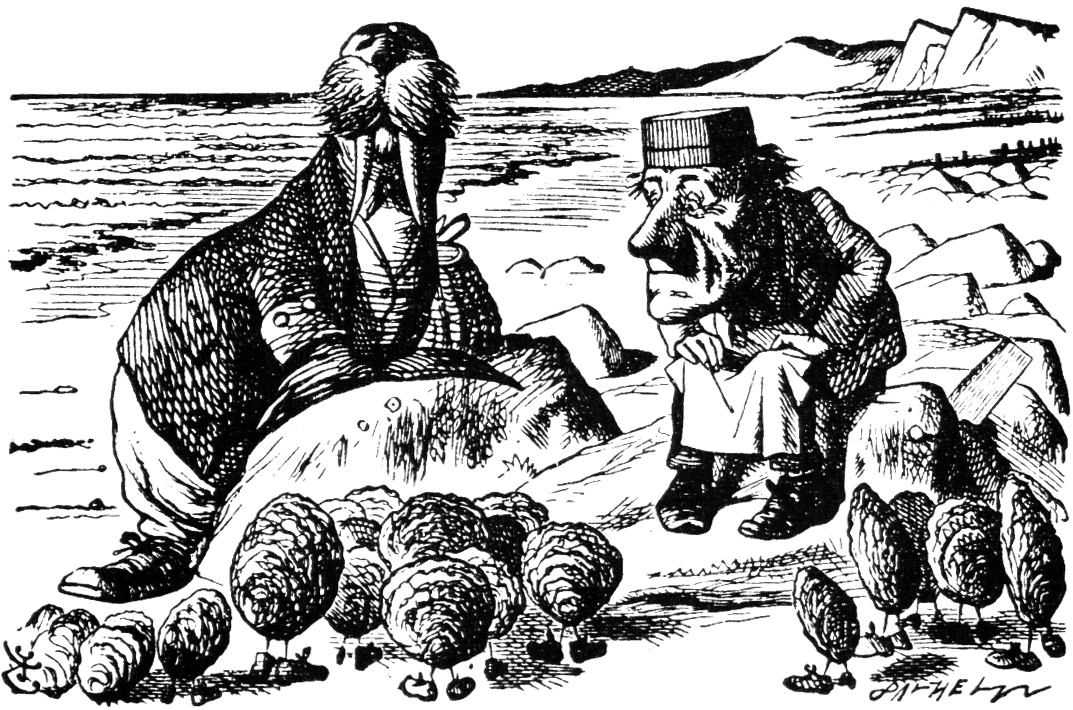
John Tenniel's illustration for Lewis Carroll's poem "The Walrus and the Carpenter"

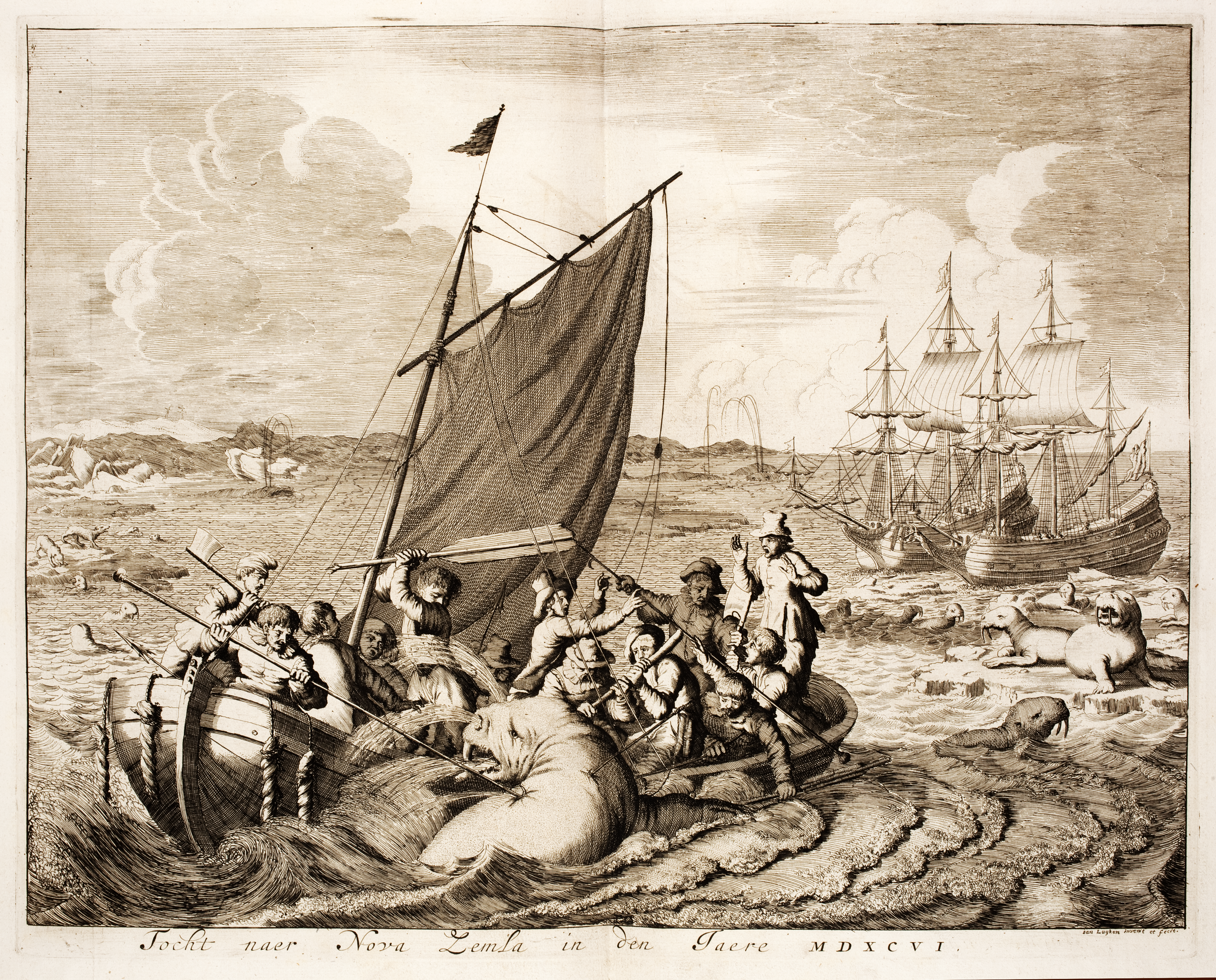
Dutch explorers fight a walrus on the coast of Novaya Zemlya, 1596

Most of the distinctive 12th-century Lewis Chessmen from northern Europe are carved from walrus ivory, though a few have been found to be made of whales' teeth.

==== Literature ====
Because of its distinctive appearance, great bulk, and immediately recognizable whiskers and tusks, the walrus also appears in the popular cultures of peoples with little direct experience with the animal, particularly in English children's literature. Perhaps its best-known appearance is in Lewis Carroll's whimsical poem "The Walrus and the Carpenter" that appears in his 1871 book Through the Looking-Glass. In the poem, the eponymous antiheroes use trickery to consume a great number of oysters. Although Carroll accurately portrays the biological walrus's appetite for bivalve mollusks, oysters, primarily nearshore and intertidal inhabitants, these organisms in fact comprise an insignificant portion of its diet in captivity.

The "walrus" in the cryptic song "I Am the Walrus" by the Beatles is a reference to the Lewis Carroll poem.

Another appearance of the walrus in literature is in the story "The White Seal" in Rudyard Kipling's The Jungle Book, where it is the "old Sea Vitch—the big, ugly, bloated, pimpled, fat-necked, long-tusked walrus of the North Pacific, who has no manners except when he is asleep".

== See also ==
- Elephant seal
