= Stena (walrus) =

Walrus spotted in Finnish waters in 2022

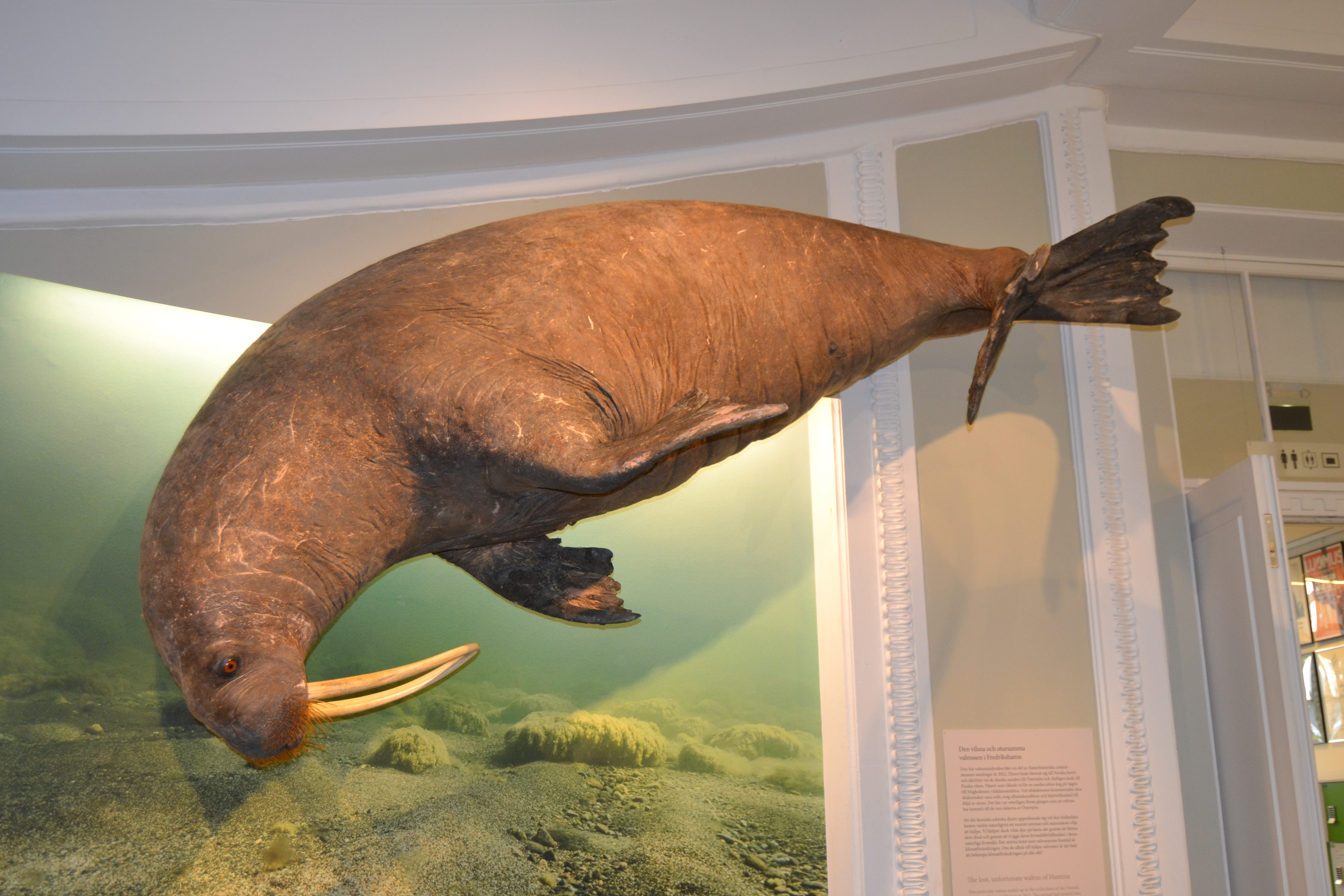
- Stena preserved at the Finnish Museum of Natural History
- Species: Walrus
- Sex: Female
- Died: 19 July 2022; Finland

Stena, also known as the walrus of Hamina, was the nickname of a female walrus who, in July 2022, died while being transported in Finland.

Stena was first spotted near Hamina, where she spent the night on a beach. Two days later, she got stuck in a fishing net near Kotka and capsized a fishing boat. Following this, Stena swam up a river and climbed over land to a domestic garden 150 meters (yards) inland. Stena was reportedly very weak, and it was decided to bring her to a veterinary hospital in a zoo.

Rescue teams hoped to transport Stena away from the garden in a box and over to Korkeasaari Zoo in Helsinki. However, she did not survive the journey. The zoo stated that she would likely not have survived in the wild. A pathologist was to determine her cause of death.

== See also ==
- Freya
- Thor
