= Wally the Walrus =

Arctic walrus seen in Western Europe

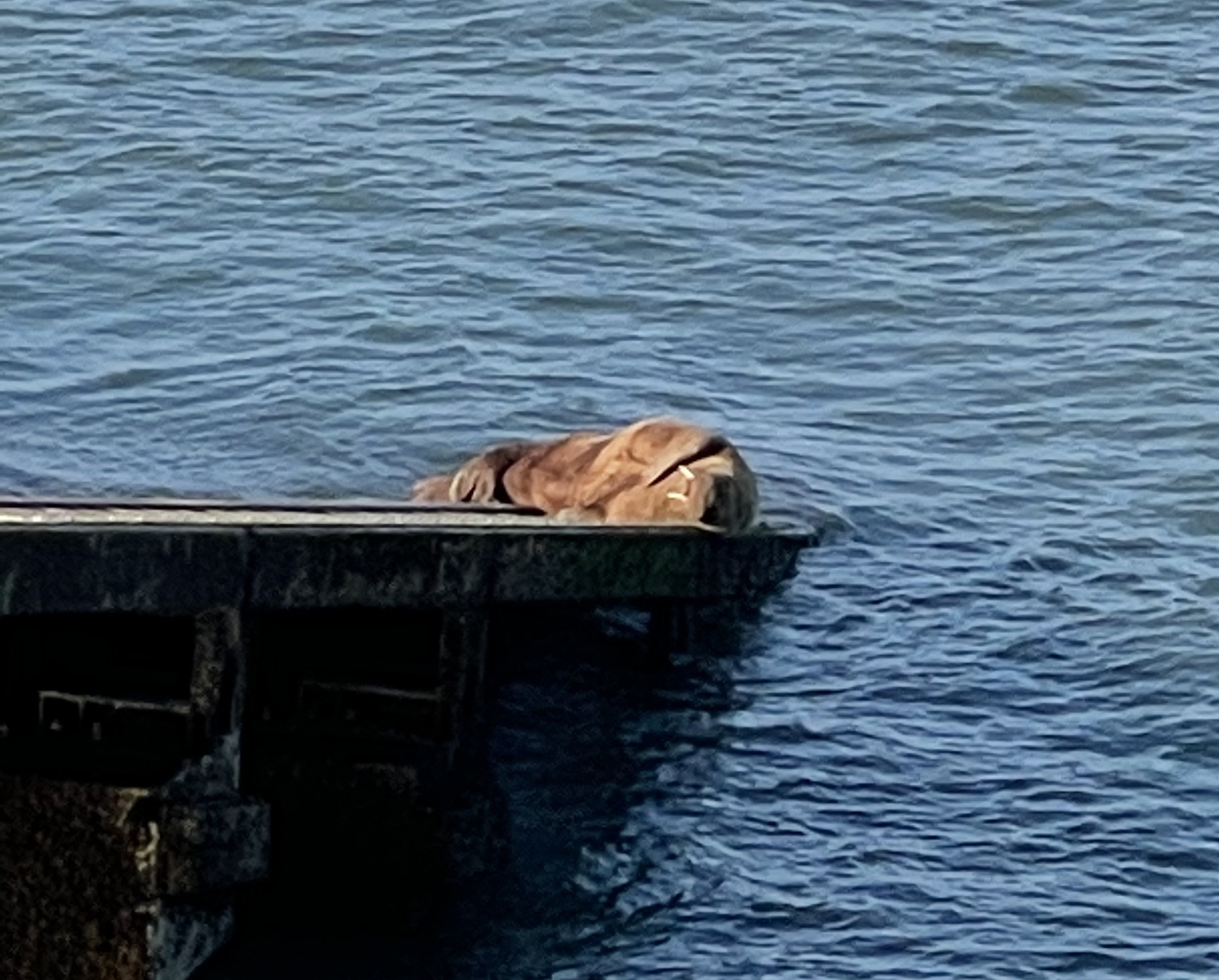
- Wally sleeping on the lifeboat station slipway at Tenby
- Other name: Wally the Wandering Walrus
- Sex: Male
- Known for: Travelling long distances around the coast of Western Europe.
- Weight: 800 kg (1,764 lb; 126 st 0 lb)

Wally the Walrus, also known as Wally the Wandering Walrus, is a male arctic walrus who attracted much media attention for appearing, and hauling out, during 2021 in several locations across the coast of western Europe, mainly Ireland and Britain, far away from the typical range of a walrus. He is estimated to weigh around 800 kilograms (1,800 lb).

== Biography ==
Wally is thought to have first appeared in March 2021, on Valentia Island, County Kerry, Ireland. Days later, he was spotted in Wales near Broad Haven South beach, Pembrokeshire. Wally was then seen basking on the RNLI lifeboat slipway in Tenby. While in Tenby, Wally would regularly sunbathe on the lifeboat slipway, causing problems when the lifeboat needed to be deployed. The local lifeboat crew used several methods to deter him, on one occasion using an airhorn. Wally also sank a dinghy and attempted to board a fishing boat in Tenby Harbour. Following these sightings in Wales, Wally left Tenby after nearly three months and was spotted off the coast of Padstow in Cornwall.

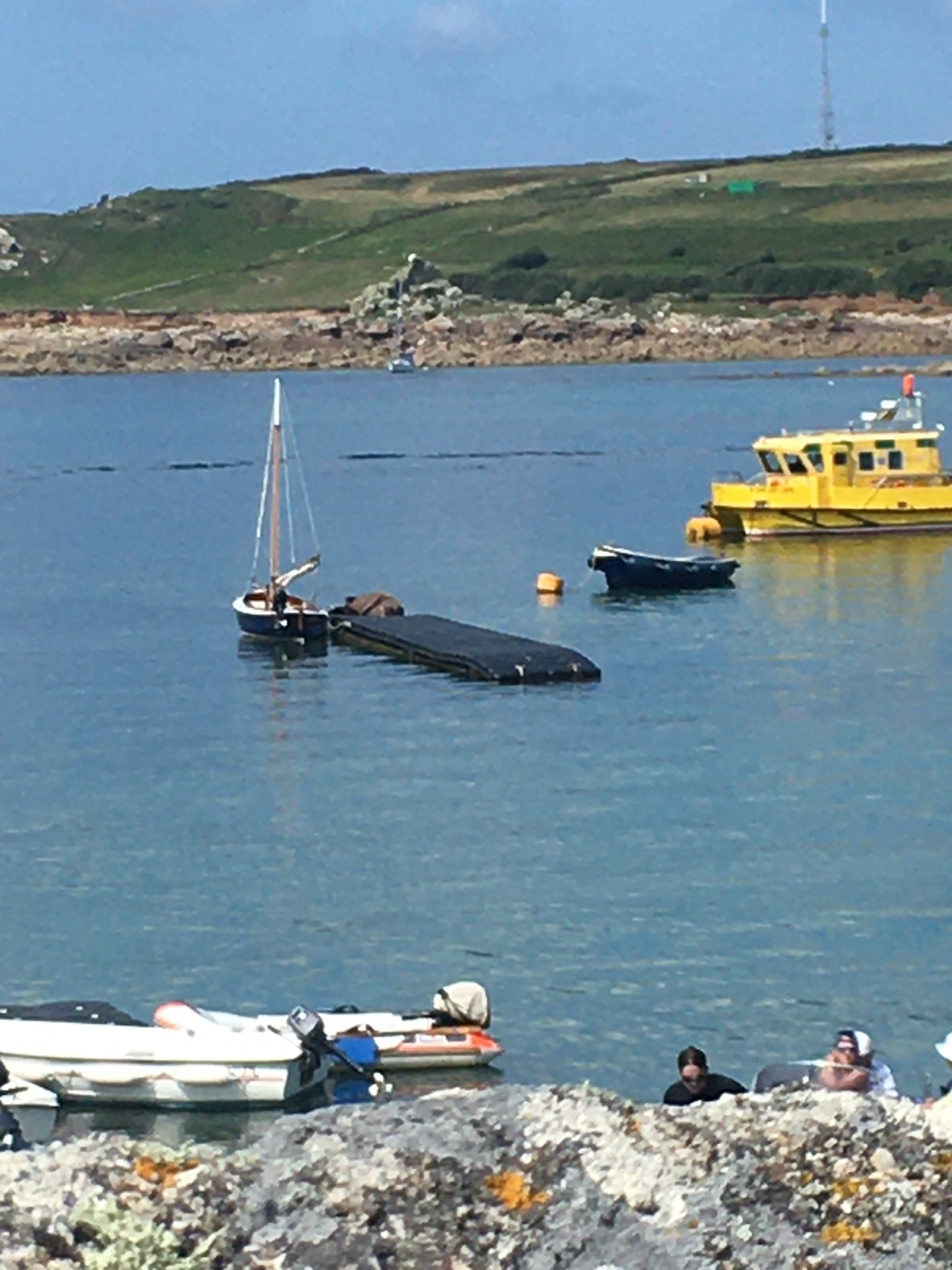
Wally the Walrus resting on his pontoon in St Mary's Harbour on 1 July 2021

In May 2021, Wally the Walrus was seen in Les Sables d'Olonne in western France, where local wildlife experts feared he had been hit by a boat. After a sighting in Bilbao, Spain, Wally was seen two weeks later near the Isles of Scilly, trying to mount boats near Porthcressa Beach, south of Hugh Town. Wally was also pictured off St Martins, sleeping on a local fishing boat. While in the Isles of Scilly, Wally the Walrus sank and damaged several boats, leading local groups, including the British Divers Marine Life Rescue, Devon and Cornwall Police, RNLI, Isles of Scilly Wildlife Trust, and St Mary's harbour authority, to come up with a plan to humanely remove or deter Wally from the harbour. Wally was also given a purpose-built pontoon in St Mary's harbour to bask on and to act as a safe space, which would also deter him from mounting boats, which would damage them. He left the Isles of Scilly after nearly three months in early August.

After leaving the Isles of Scilly, Wally the Walrus swam to Crookhaven Harbour in County Cork, where another pontoon was floated for him to use to stop him from damaging local boats. Three weeks after leaving Ireland, in September 2021, Wally was spotted in Iceland.

== Response ==
While Wally the Walrus was in the Isles of Scilly, a petition was launched to "Get Wally the walrus home", which attracted around 200 signatures as of June 2021.

In 2024, Dutch author Irwan Droog published a book (Wally en wij) about Wally and his journey through Western Europe. In the book, Droog visits all of the places where Wally was seen.
