= Thor (walrus) =

Wayward walrus in Europe since 2022

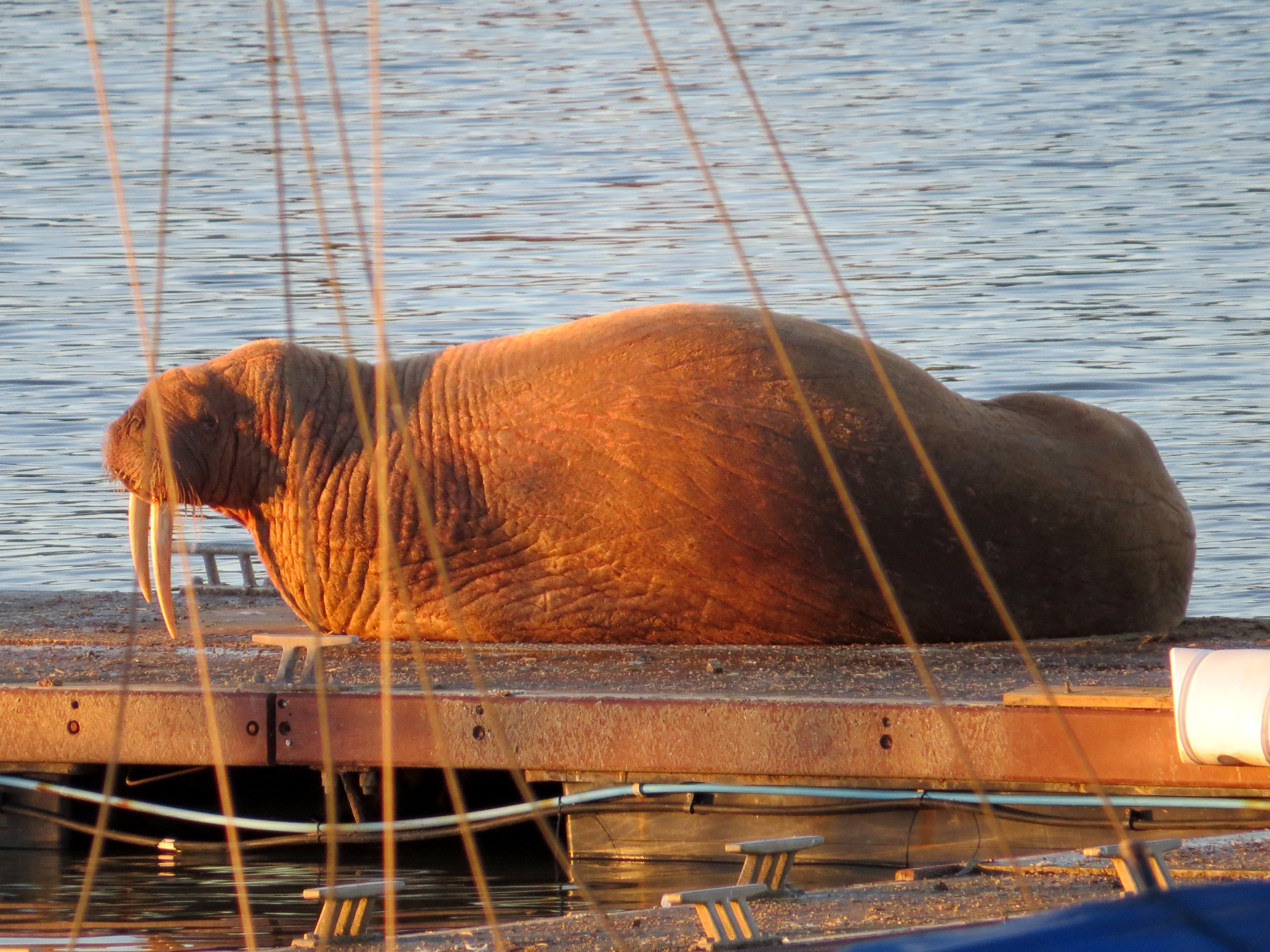
- Thor in Blyth Harbour, Northumberland, 2 January 2023
- Species: Walrus
- Sex: Male
- Born: Circa 2014
- Weight: 750 kg (1,653 lb; 118 st 1 lb)
- Named after: Thor

Thor is the nickname of a vagrant Atlantic walrus (Odobenus rosmarus rosmarus) first seen in the Netherlands, in November 2022.

Thor is a male walrus probably about eight years old at the end of 2022, and estimated to weigh around 750 kilograms (1,650 lb).

Thor was originally sighted on 6 November 2022, first in Petten, North Holland, then Neeltje Jans island, Zeeland, and subsequently travelled along the north coast of France to Brittany. In December 2022, Thor was spotted at Calshot, Hampshire and then in Scarborough Harbour, North Yorkshire on New Year's Eve. While in Scarborough, Thor was seen masturbating, showing he had reached sexual maturity, which in walrus is typically at age 8–10 years. On 2 January 2023 Thor appeared in Blyth, Northumberland, resting for several hours before moving on overnight.

On 24 February 2023 British Divers Marine Life Rescue reported that Thor had moved on to Breiðdalsvík in eastern Iceland, about 1360 km north-north-west from Blyth.

== Response ==
Whilst Thor was in Calshot, the British Divers Marine Life Rescue issued warnings to the public to not get too close to the walrus and kept a cordon up to allow him to rest.

Thor again appeared on New Year's Eve 2022 in Scarborough, North Yorkshire. British Divers Marine Life Rescue maintained a cordon through the night and the daytime until 4.20pm when he departed. Scarborough's New Year fireworks were cancelled after concerns arose after Marine Mammal Medics witnessed him becoming stressed at flashing lights from vehicles. Scarborough Borough Council leader Steve Siddons said "the welfare of the walrus has to take precedence". Emily Mayman, Yorkshire & Lincolnshire Assistant Coordinator for British Divers Marine Life Rescue praised the decision made to cancel the fireworks as a big step forward for animal welfare. Thor's masturbatory behaviour in front of a large crowd of spectators was videoed, which went viral, with over 4 million views by 3 January 2023.

== See also ==
- Freya
- Stena
