= List of individual dogs =

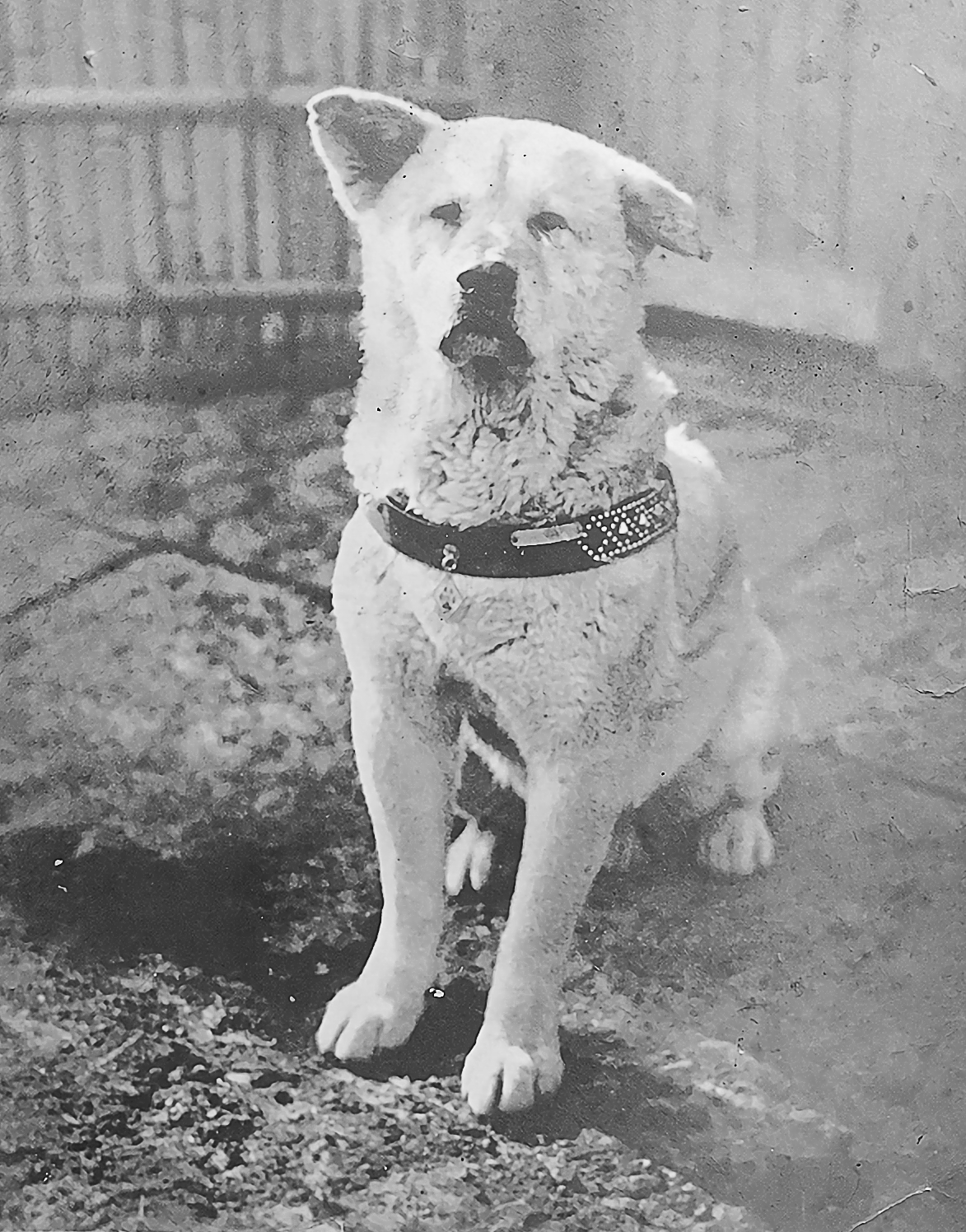
Hachikō, an Akita famed for his exceptional loyalty

The following is a list of individual dogs.

== Actors ==
=== Advertising ===
- Banjo portrayed Alex, an Irish Setter-Golden Retriever mix and star of Stroh's beer advertising in the 1980s. Also mentioned in the 1989 Tone Lōc song "Funky Cold Medina".
- Cheeka, a Pug who appeared in the popular "You & I" advertising campaign of Hutch's cellular service in India, along with the child actor Jayaram.
- Gidget, a female Chihuahua, was featured in a Taco Bell advertising campaign as the "Taco Bell Chihuahua". She also played the role of Bruiser's mother in the 2003 film Legally Blonde 2.
- Honey Tree Evil Eye, a female Bull Terrier, was known as Spuds MacKenzie in her role as the Budweiser spokes-dog.
- Nipper, the dog with the gramophone in the 1901 His Master's Voice logo.
- Sam, a Golden Retriever "professional stand-in, and stunt double", portrays the real Duke Bush (Duffy "Duke" of Castlebury) at promotional events and in commercials for Bush's Best Baked Beans.
- Tinkerbelle, a Papillon/Maltese mix and canine model featured in advertisements for various companies.

=== Film ===
- Ace the Wonder Dog, appeared in numerous films and serials in the 1930s and 1940s.
- Blair, a Collie, the first dog screen star, starred in Rescued by Rover in 1905.
- Buddy, a Golden Retriever, starred in the 1997 film Air Bud but died from cancer a year later.
- Cosmo, a Jack Russell Terrier from the 2010 film Beginners.
- Darla, a Bichon Frise best known for her role as Precious in the 1991 thriller The Silence of the Lambs.
- Higgins, a small Poodle-Schnauzer mix, played the leading role of Benji in the movie of the same name and had a recurring role on the TV series Petticoat Junction.
- Jean, the Vitagraph Dog, a Scotch Collie who is the screen's first leading canine to have her name in the film title; starred in movies from 1908 to 1913.
- Jed (1977–1995), a wolfdog who appeared in The Thing, The Journey of Natty Gann and White Fang.
- Keystone Teddy, a dog actor in the early 20th century, including in the namesake 1917 film Teddy at the Throttle.
- Koko, a red Australian Kelpie, played Red Dog in the 2011 film adaptation based on the eponymous novel.
- Lightning, a German Shepherd who played Prince in the first Perry Mason film, The Case of the Howling Dog (1934) and appeared in many other films.
- Luke the Dog, an American Pit Bull Terrier that performed in multiple silent films and shorts between 1914 and 1920.
- Messi, a Border Collie, played service dog Snoop in Justine Triet's 2023 film Anatomy of a Fall. Messi won the 2023 Palm Dog Award.
- Moose and his son Enzo, both Jack Russell Terriers, in My Dog Skip.
- Pal, a Collie, played Lassie in the 1943 film Lassie Come Home (based on the 1940 novel by Eric Knight), six more Lassie films, and two Lassie television show pilots.
- Peggy, actor in Deadpool & Wolverine and considered "Britain's ugliest dog".
- Pete the Pup, portrayed by several American Pit Bull Terriers in the Our Gang (Little Rascals) series.
- Red Dog, appeared in the 2011 film Red Dog and 2016 film Red Dog: True Blue, based on the true life story of a Kelpie who wandered around the outback Western Australia, looking for its owner.
- Rin Tin Tin (1918–1932), an internationally famous German Shepherd actor who starred in many silent films and a few sound films. His descendants carried on in film, radio and television roles.
- Shelby, the dog who acted Bella in A Dog's Way Home. She was found in a dumpster and then later taken to a shelter, before being trained for acting; she is now a therapy dog.
- Skippy, a Wire Fox Terrier who, among other roles in 1930s films, played Asta in The Thin Man film and sequels.
- Strongheart, also known as Etzel von Oeringen, was the first German Shepherd with name-above-the-title billing in a film. He starred in an adaptation of White Fang, released in 1925, and The Return of Boston Blackie, released in 1927.
- Sykes, star of several films, adverts and the British TV series, Midsomer Murders.
- Terry, a Cairn Terrier, played Toto in the 1939 film The Wizard of Oz.
- Uggie, a Jack Russell Terrier, played Jack in the 2011 film The Artist and Queenie in the film Water for Elephants.

=== Television ===
- Bouncer, played a dog also called Bouncer in the Australian soap opera Neighbours.
- Bullet, "the Wonder Dog", a black and silver AKC registered German Shepherd (originally: "Bullet Von Berge") was a regular on the '50s TV show The Roy Rogers Show; his taxidermic remains (along with Trigger) were displayed at The Roy Rogers & Dale Evans Museum and he was sold in 2010 at Christie's for $35,000.
- Happy, furry white dog playing Happy on the TV show 7th Heaven.
- Inky, a police dog who appeared in the British police drama Softly, Softly: Taskforce during 1969–70.
- Madison, a Labrador Retriever, best known for playing the role of Vincent on the television series Lost.
  - Pono also played Vincent, which features in flashback scenes.
- Moose played Eddie on the TV show Frasier.
  - He shared the role with his son Enzo.
- Petra, a mixed breed, the first Blue Peter dog; the 'original' Petra died after making one appearance and was replaced by a look-alike; this was kept secret until many years after the substitute's death.
- Shep, a Border Collie, featured on the Blue Peter television series.
- Soccer, a Jack Russell Terrier, star of the PBS show Wishbone.
- Ted, a Patterdale Terrier, appeared on Mortimer & Whitehouse: Gone Fishing.
- Tiger, appeared in The Brady Bunch and played a dog named Blood in the movie A Boy and His Dog.
- Yukon King, an Alaskan Husky, played the lead sled dog and faithful sidekick of Sergeant Preston in Sergeant Preston of the Yukon.
- Zeltim Odie Peterson, aka Odie the Talking Pug, a pug that said "I Love You" on various talk shows.

== Athletes ==
- Ashley Whippet, the first disc dog, was a canine athlete of the 1970s and three-time winner of the Canine Frisbee Disc World Championships.
- Cindy, a Greyhound who earned Guinness World Record's Highest Jump by a Dog. Cindy cleared a 5.5-foot (1.7 m) hurdle.
- King Buck, a Labrador Retriever, successfully completed an unprecedented 63 consecutive series in the National Championship Stake and was the National Retriever Field Trial Club champion for two successive years (in 1952 and 1953), which accomplishment was not duplicated for nearly 40 years. He was also the first dog to appear on a United States Fish and Wildlife Service duck stamp, which always featured a water fowl.
- Master McGrath, an Irish Greyhound whose racing victories and fame gained him an audience with the British Royal Family.
- Mick the Miller, a racing Greyhound, was the first greyhound to win the English Derby in successive years and the first greyhound to run a 525-yard (480 m) course in under 30 seconds.
- Snip Nua, an Irish racing Greyhound partly owned by comedian Dara Ó Briain. Snip Nua's racing was viewed by 3 million UK viewers on the show Three Men Go to Ireland.

== Faithful dogs ==
=== Faithful after owner's death ===
- Canelo in Cádiz, Spain, used to walk with his owner to the hospital where he was receiving dialysis treatment. In 1990 his owner died at the hospital. Canelo died outside the hospital after waiting for 12 years. The town of Cádiz put his name to a street and a plaque in his honor.
- Capitán, a German Shepherd, ran away from his home in central Argentina, after the death of his owner Miguel Guzmán in 2006. About a week later, Guzmán's family found Capitán standing guard at Guzmán's grave after finding the cemetery on his own. When brought home, Capitán again ran away back to the grave of his former owner. He stood vigil over his owner's grave and received provisions from the cemetery staff so he did not need to leave. Capitán died in 2018.
- Dżok ("Jock") would wait for an entire year at the Rondo Grunwaldzkie roundabout in Kraków, Poland, to be fetched back by his owner, who had died there.
- Fido, a mixed-breed dog, whose owner, Carlo Soriani, had died in an air raid over Borgo San Lorenzo (near Florence, in Italy) in 1943, during World War II. Fido waited in vain, for the following 14 years, for Soriani's return, going daily to the bus stop in Luco del Mugello (a frazione of Borgo) where the man used to get off after coming home from work.
- Greyfriars Bobby, a Skye Terrier in Edinburgh, Scotland, was loyal to his owner long after his owner's death in 1858. Until Bobby's death 14 years later, he reportedly spent every night at his owner's grave. A statue in memorial of Greyfriars Bobby was erected near the graveyard. Several films have been made dramatising the life of Greyfriars Bobby, and in folklore he is popularly remembered throughout Scotland as a symbol of loyalty.
- Hachikō, an Akita who became a symbol of loyalty in Japan, is now honored by a statue in Tokyo. Hachikō is famous for his loyalty to his long-dead owner Hidesaburō Ueno, by returning to the train station and waiting for his return, every day for the next nine years during the time the train was scheduled to arrive.
- K9 Big Wolf (Chinese: 大狼; pinyin: Dà láng) - Police dog of the (now-defunct) People's Armed Police Border Defense Corps Dehong detachment. On 22 August 2011, his handler Private Yao Yuanjun (姚元军) drowned while fighting with drug traffickers, and several months later "Big Wolf" was filmed on national TV, still waiting for his handler to return at their training location near the Shweli River, gaining fame on Chinese social media; "Big Wolf" continues to wait at the same training site for over a decade.
- Kostya, in the mid-1990s in Tolyatti, Russia – a man and a girl died in a car crash during the summer of 1995, leaving their dog as the only survivor. The German Shepherd, named Constantine aka Kostya or Faithful Kostya by the locals, kept coming to the same spot for the next seven years braving freezing winters and hot summers. Loyalty – a bronze statue honouring the dog's loyalty was placed on that spot in 2003 by the city authorities.
- Pikeman's dog, a terrier that stayed with his owner who fought as a pikeman at the Battle of the Eureka Stockade and accompanied the corpse to the cemetery.
- Ruswarp, a Border Collie who disappeared while hiking with his owner Graham Nuttall in the Welsh Mountains near Llandrindod Wells on 20 January 1990. On 7 April, a hiker discovered Nuttall's body near a mountain stream, where Ruswarp had been standing guard for 11 weeks. The 14-year-old dog was so weak he had to be carried off the mountain, and died shortly after Nuttall's funeral. There is a statue of Ruswarp on a platform of Garsdale railway station.
- Seaman, the Newfoundland belonging to explorer Meriweather Lewis, would not eat or leave his owner's grave, and died of grief.
- Shep, belonging to a sheepherder who died in Fort Benton, Montana, in August 1936 followed his owner's casket to the train station and fashioned a den under the depot platform after the body was shipped back east. For the next five and a half years, Shep met every passenger train arriving there—four a day—sniffing at the passengers and baggage car doors. His vigil became widely publicized including a feature in "Ripley's Believe It or Not". Passengers took the Havre to Great Falls rail line just to see the dog, and he received so much fan mail that the Great Northern Railroad assigned a secretary to help with responses. On 12 Jan. 1942, Shep was struck and killed by an arriving train. AP and UPI issued his obituary nationwide; thousands sent condolences and hundreds attended his funeral. The Great Northern erected an obelisk at his gravesite on a bluff overlooking the depot and town. In 1994, the citizens of Fort Benton further memorialized the dog with a heroic bronze erected on the town's steamboat levee.
- Waghya, meaning "tiger" in Marathi, was the pet dog of Maratha king Chhatrapati Shivaji. After Shivaji's death, the dog mourned and is said to have jumped into his owner's funeral pyre and immolated himself. A statue was put up on a pedestal next to Shivaji's tomb at Raigad Fort.

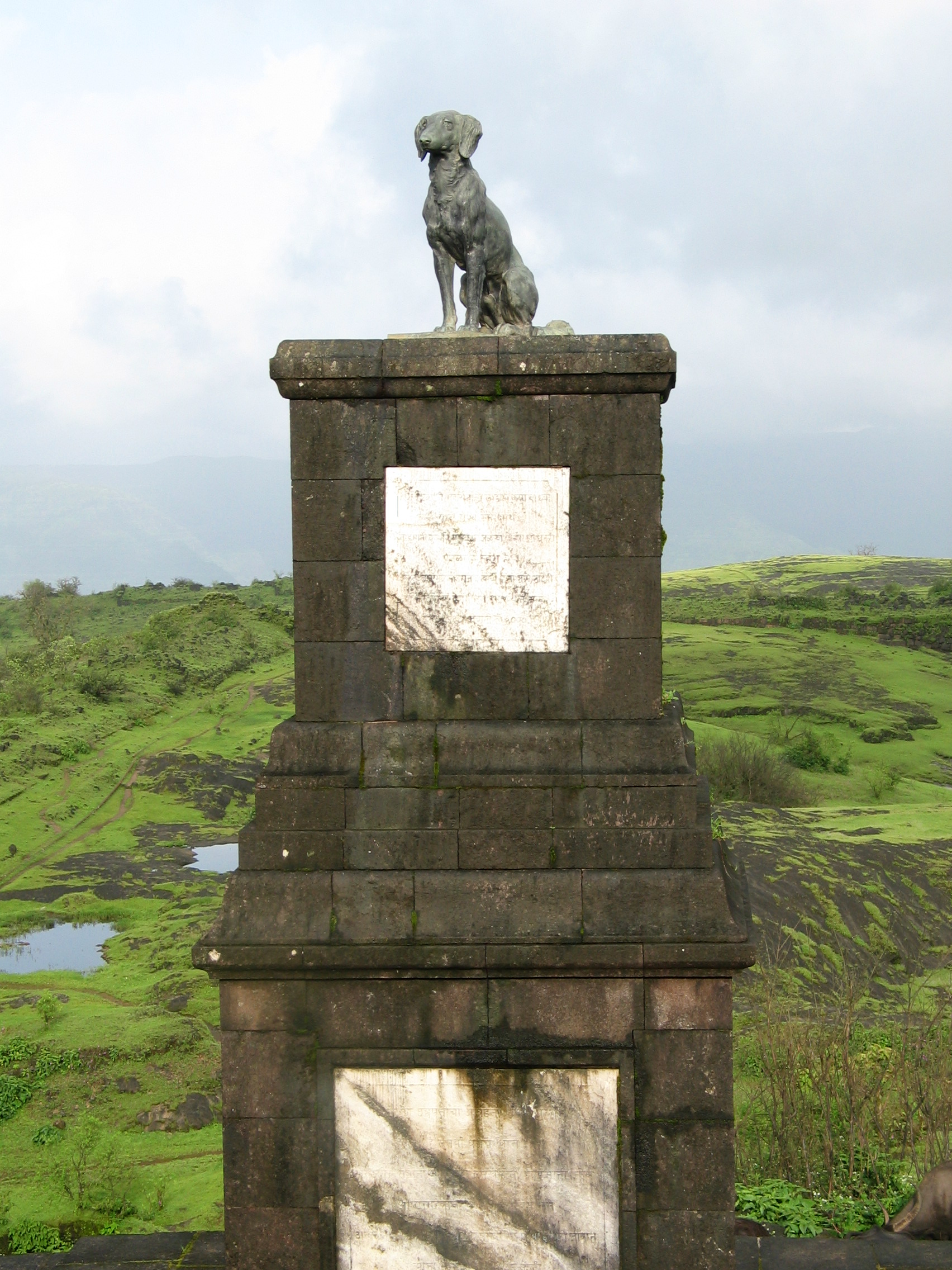
Statue of Waghya, symbol of pure loyalty and devotion in India

=== Homing dogs ===
- Baekgu, the Korean Jindo Dog, after being sold by the original owner due to economic hardship to a new owner 300 km away, came back to the original owner after seven months.
- Bobbie the Wonder Dog, after accidental abandonment on a cross-country trip, Bobbie made his way back over 2,551 miles (4,105 km) to his family's home.

=== Other faithful dogs ===
- Bob the Railway Dog, a loyal traveller and drivers' companion on the South Australian Railways in the late 19th century.
- Fidèle, a famous dog that could usually be seen sleeping out of his window in Bruges.
- Kelsey, a dog, was hailed a hero after he rescued his owner who became paralyzed when he slipped and fell in the snow. Kelsey stayed by his side licking his face to keep him warm for nearly 20 hours.
- Mari: A Tale of Mari and Three Puppies is based on a true story in the 2004 Chūetsu earthquake. Mari gave birth to three puppies. That spring, animals behaved strangely, foreshadowing something major to come. On 23 October 2004, a major earthquake, which later became known as the Chūetsu earthquake, struck and devastated the whole village. At that time, only grandfather and Aya were at home, and they were pinned down by a wardrobe that collapsed onto them. Mari quickly moved her puppies to a safe place and successfully rescued her grandfather and Aya from that disaster.
- Nig, a mixed-breed dog taken in as a puppy in 1932 by the construction workers of the Hoover Dam. Considered their mascot, he accompanied workers daily to and from the site, even carrying a sack lunch. In 1941, he died and was buried at the dam, where he remains commemorated with a plaque.
- Old Drum, a hunting dog whose death at the hands of a neighbor was the subject of a lawsuit and George Graham Vest's famous summation to the jury, known as "Eulogy of the Dog", which asserts that a man's unique relationship with his dog should influence how the law is interpreted and implemented in such cases. The case has been influential in courts ever since.
- Patsy Ann, known as the "Official Greeter of Juneau". She was a Bull Terrier that greeted ships as they docked in Juneau.
- Pompey, a Pug that foiled an assassination attempt on the life of William The Silent.
- Red Dog, a Kelpie who wandered around the outback of Western Australia looking for its owner.
- Taro and Jiro, two Sakhalin Huskies that survived a year of abandonment on the frozen continent of Antarctica until members of a Japanese Expedition team rescued them.
- Zander, a 70-pound (32 kg), approximately 7-year-old Samoyed-husky mix who escaped his home and traveled more than two "hard miles" (fording a stream, crossing a busy highway, and navigating complex neighborhoods) to arrive at a hospital in an area where he had never been, where he was stopped by a hospital employee who called the cell phone number on his dog tag and reached Zander's owner in a room inside the hospital where he had been lying for several days recuperating from an illness.

== Working dogs ==
=== War dogs ===
- Antis, a German Shepherd, served with Václav Robert Bozděch, a Czech airman, in the French Air Force and the No. 311 (Czechoslovak) Squadron RAF in Britain, and helped his owner escape after the death of Jan Masaryk; winner of the Dickin Medal, the equivalent of the Victoria Cross for dogs.
- Bamse, a Saint Bernard, was a symbol of the Free Norwegian Forces in World War II.

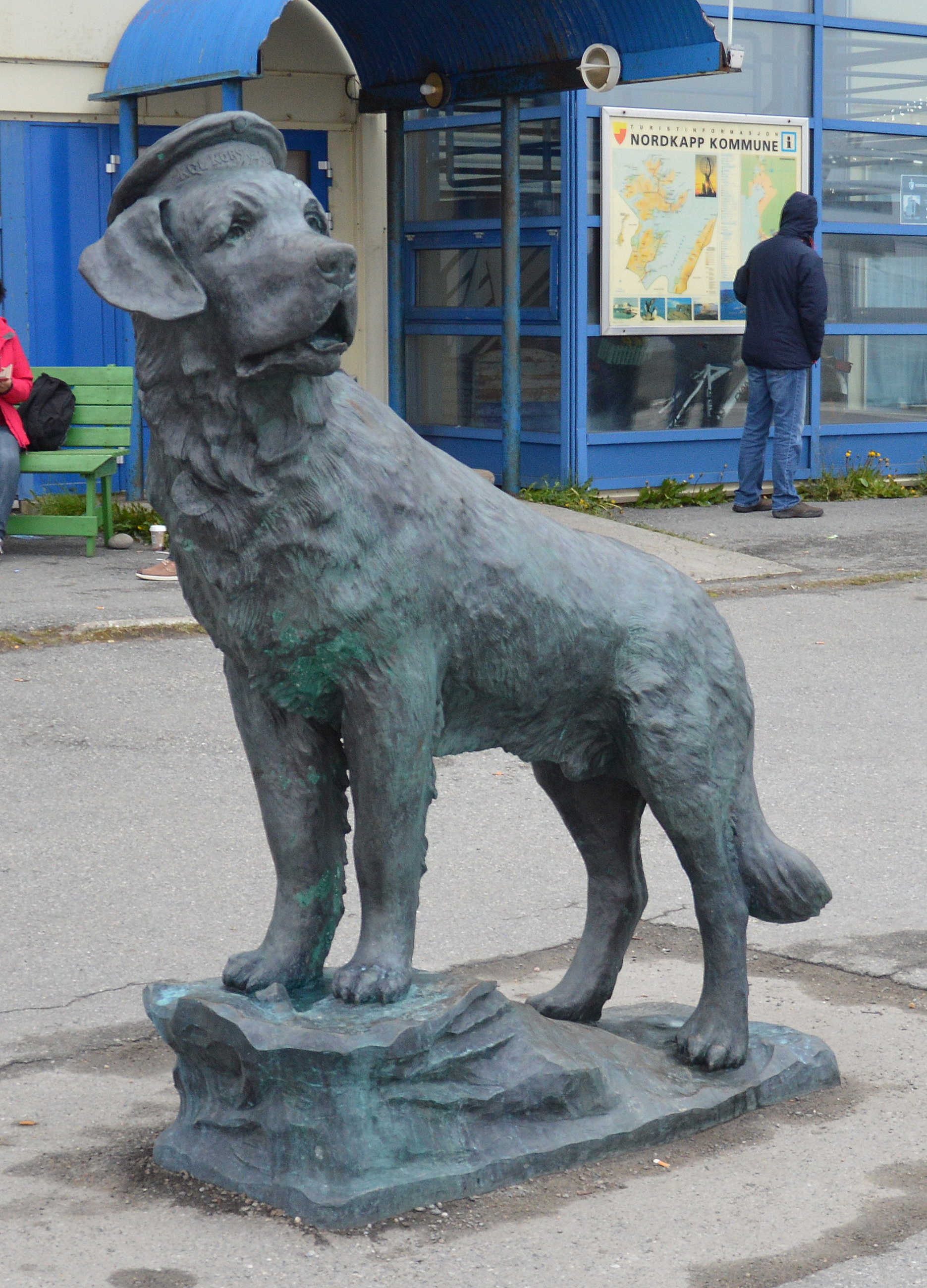
Statue of Bamse in Honningsvåg

- Bart, a German Shepherd working with SEAL Team Six who was killed along with 38 people which consisted of U.S. special operation troops, aviators and Afghan commandos in 2011.
- Becerrillo, a Castilian attack dog during the time of the Spanish conquistadors.
- Bing, a German Shepherd and Collie cross who parachuted with the 6th Airborne Division on D-Day and winner of the Dickin Medal.
- Caesar, was taught to locate wounded soldiers on the battlefields of the Western Front and guide them back to safety.
- Cairo, a Belgian Malinois used by U.S. Navy SEALs in Operation Neptune Spear, in which Osama bin Laden was killed.
- Chesty, one of a family of bulldogs, serving as the official mascot of Marine Barracks, Washington, D.C. These dogs are actually enlisted in the U.S. Marine Corps, most attaining the rank of corporal.
- Chips, the most decorated hero war dog of World War II.
- Chopper, a Navy SEAL dog who served in Iraq in Afghanistan from 2007-2011. Chopper was honored at the White House and, along with his handler Trevor Maroshek, was the subject of a 2015 Smithsonian Channel documentary SEAL Dog.
- Conan, a Delta Force dog who participated in the Barisha raid in 2019.
- Crumstone Irma, a German Shepherd who assisted in the rescue of 191 people trapped under blitzed buildings, was awarded the Dickin Medal in 1945.
- Gander, a Newfoundland, was posthumously awarded the Dickin Medal for his feats during the Battle of Hong Kong in World War II.
- Gunner, Canine air-raid early warning system during the bombing of Darwin in World War II.
- Horrie the Wog Dog, found in Egypt by Australian Forces in 1942 during World War II, saved the lives of many Australian soldiers. Horrie was refused admission back to Australia after service in Europe; he was saved by his mates smuggling him to his new home in Australia.
- Jet of Iada a German Shepherd, who assisted in the rescue of 150 people trapped under blitzed buildings. He was awarded both the Dickin Medal and the RSPCA's Medallion of Valor for his rescue efforts.
- Judy, a ship's dog who served with the Royal Navy, was the only animal to have been officially registered as a Japanese prisoner of war. She survived the death camps on the Burma Railway and was awarded the Dickin Medal in 1946.
- Just Nuisance, a Great Dane, the only dog to have been officially enlisted in the Royal Navy, was buried with full military honours upon his death in 1944.
- K9 Big Wolf - See #Faithful after owner's death
- Kurt, a Doberman Pinscher "Devil Dog" credited with saving the lives of at least 250 U.S. Marines during the 1944 Battle of Guam by alerting them to Japanese soldiers. Kurt was mortally wounded on patrol, on 23 July, becoming the first Marine K-9 combat casualty. He was the first to be buried in what would become the National War Dog Cemetery in Guam, where his likeness in bronze sits atop the World War II War Dog Memorial that includes names inscribed for the Dobermans who died while serving with the U.S. Marine Corps on Guam.
- Lava, a mixed breed dog, was adopted as a puppy by the 1st Battalion 3rd Marines Unit nicknamed the Lava Dogs. He was rescued from Iraq in 2005 by Lieutenant Colonel Jay Kopelman. Lava is the subject of the book From Baghdad, With Love by Kopelman and Melinda Roth.
- Lex, the first actively working military working dog to be adopted by family members of their handler, prior to being retired.
- Lucca, a dog working for the U.S. Marine Corps who was awarded the Dickin Medal.
- Moustache, a barbet said to have participated in several battles of the French Revolutionary and Napoleonic Wars.
- Nemo A534, a German Shepherd who saved the life of his handler in battle despite having been shot in the nose and losing an eye.
- Nigger, a black Labrador Retriever belonging to Guy Gibson, gave his name as the codename for the Dam Busters mission in World War II. His name is usually edited out of modern versions of the film about the mission due to the offensiveness of the term to modern viewers.
- Patron, an explosives detection dog that received the Order for Courage third class during the 2022 Russian invasion of Ukraine.
- Philly, a mutt and World War I "hero"; mascot of Company A of the 315 Infantry, 79th Division ("Philadelphia's Own").
- Rags, a Signal Corps mascot during World War I.
- Rex (E168), a U.S. Marine military working dog handled and later owned by Corporal Megan Leavey whose story was chronicled in the 2017 film Megan Leavey.
- Rifleman Khan, a German Shepherd who won the Dickin Medal for bravery.
- Rip, a World War II search and rescue dog.
- Rob, a Collie working dog on a farm in Shropshire until 1942, when his owners enlisted him as a war dog. Assigned to the Special Air Service at the base in Wivenhoe Park, Essex. Subsequently awarded the Dickin Medal in February 1945.
- Sallie Ann Jarrett, Civil War mascot of the 11th Pennsylvania Volunteer Infantry regiment, whose bronze statue is part of the regimental monument at Gettysburg.

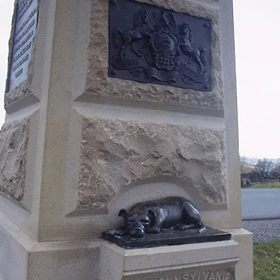
Statue at Gettysburg of Sallie Ann Jarrett, Civil War mascot of the 11th Pennsylvania Volunteer Infantry

- Sarbi, an Australian special forces explosives detection dog who spent almost 14 months missing in action (MIA) in Afghanistan before being recovered in 2009.
- Sasha, bomb-sniffing dog, posthumously awarded the Dickin Medal.
- Sinbad, the U.S. Coast Guard's most famous mascot. He was adopted by a crewman from the cutter Campbell prior to World War II. He was so beloved by the crew that they actually enlisted him in the Coast Guard. Sinbad had a book written about him.

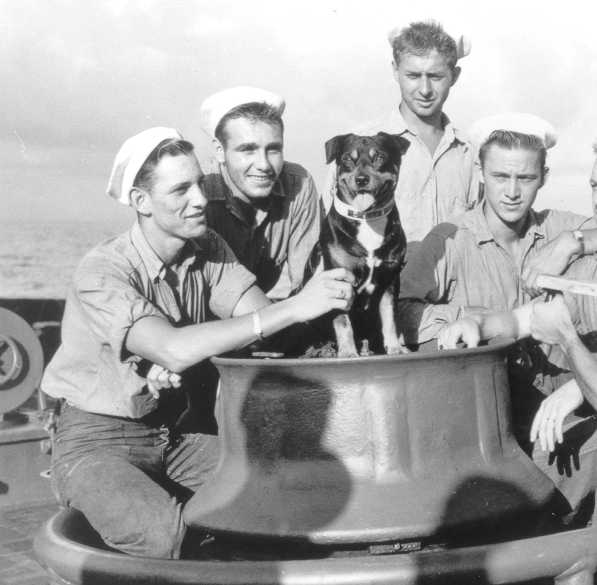
Sinbad and crew, 1943

- Smoky, hero war dog of World War II, was a Yorkshire Terrier who served with the 5th Air Force in the Pacific after she was adopted by Corporal William Wynne. Smoky was credited with twelve combat missions and awarded eight battle stars. Wynne authored a book about his adventures with Smoky entitled Yorkie Doodle Dandy: Or, the Other Woman Was a Real Dog.
- Stubby, aka Sergeant Stubby, a Boston Terrier/American Pit Bull Terrier, the most decorated war dog of World War I and the only dog to be nominated for rank and then promoted to sergeant through combat. He was also a mascot at Georgetown University.
- Theo, an English Springer Spaniel belonging to Lance Corporal Liam Tasker of the British Army. Theo was used to sniff out roadside bombs in Afghanistan. In 2010, Theo and Tasker were in a firefight with insurgents, killing Tasker. Theo died later at a British army base from a fatal seizure, although many believe he died from a broken heart. Tasker's body and Theo's ashes were returned to England, where Tasker's family was presented with Theo's ashes in a private ceremony. In October 2012, Theo was posthumously honored with the Dickin Medal, Britain's highest award for bravery by animals.
- Tich, Dickin Medal winner of the King's Royal Rifle Corps during the Second World War.
- Treo, awarded Dickin Medal for work as an Arms and Explosives Search dog in Helmand Province, Afghanistan.
- Willie, George S. Patton's faithful Bull Terrier.

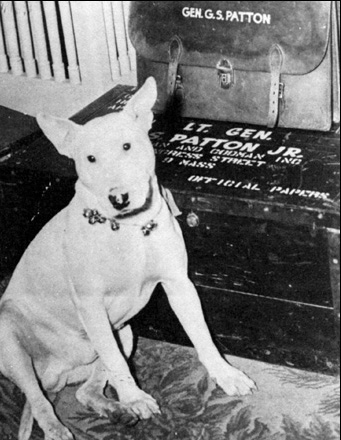
Willie, December 1945

- Zanjeer, was a Labrador Retriever who served as a detection dog with the Mumbai Police in Maharashtra state of India. Due to his impeccable service detecting many explosives and other weapons—in particular during the 1993 Mumbai bombings—he was honoured with a full state funeral.

=== Rescue dogs ===
- Aspen, a search-and-rescue Golden Retriever who assisted in searching for survivors of the Alfred P. Murrah Federal Building bombing in Oklahoma City in 1995.
- Baillie, an active search and rescue Border Collie on one of Canada's all hazards disaster response teams, Canada Task Force 2 (CAN-TF2), where she specialises in Heavy Urban Search and Rescue (HUSAR). She is also a member of Canmore Fire Rescue and mascot for Banff Emergency Medical Services in the Banff National Park. Baillie has represented Canada at the UNISDR Americas conference and has been honoured with an exhibit on her wearable technology in the Canada Science and Technology Museum in Ottawa.
- Balto, a famous sled dog, was the lead dog on the final leg of the 1925 serum run to Nome (which relayed diphtheria antitoxin by dog sled across Alaska to combat an epidemic). Balto was memorialized with a statue in New York's Central Park. An animated film was produced in 1995, telling a somewhat dramatized version of the dog's life.
- Barry, a famous Saint Bernard rescue dog, reportedly saved 40 people.
- Bilbo, a lifeguard Newfoundland dog on Sennen beach in Cornwall, credited with saving three lives.
- Dakota, a pit bull search and rescue dog who responded to over 100 search missions including the search for the astronauts who died in the 2003 Space Shuttle Columbia disaster.
- Frida, a Mexican golden Labrador credited with saving 12 people's lives and locating more than 40 bodies during her 9 years of service; gained international fame for rescue and recovery efforts following the 2017 Puebla earthquake in Mexico.
- Gandalf, a black Shiloh Shepherd search and rescue dog owned by Misha Marshall, who found missing Boy Scout Michael Auberry in March 2007.
- Kira (2019), an English Golden Retriever, who became a hero when on her own accord, she twice assisted her owner in breaking through ice and rescuing two dogs separately stranded in a frozen lake, rounding up each animal and guiding them safely to shore.
- Mancs (1994–2006), a German Shepherd, the most famous rescue dog of the Spider Special Rescue Team of Miskolc, Hungary. Became famous when he helped rescue a 3-year-old girl who spent 82 hours under the ruins after the Izmit earthquake of 1999 in Turkey.
- Nico (2015), a recently adopted Bernese Mountain Dog, became a hero when he saved two people who were being swept out into the ocean by a rip current.
- Peter, a Collie, who was a search and rescue dog during World War II.
- Swansea Jack, a Welsh dog, who rescued people from Swansea Bay and the River Tawe.
- Togo, a Siberian Husky, who was the lead dog that led the longest track while the team had the antitoxin, during the 1925 serum run to Nome (which relayed diphtheria antitoxin by dog sled across Alaska to combat an epidemic).
- Tsunami, a Border Collie who worked as a search and rescue dog. He came to popular attention for his work during the 2026 Venezuela earthquakes.
- Wilson, a Belgian Shepherd military search and rescue dog who, separated from his handlers, independently located and protected four children lost in the Colombian jungle after the 2023 crash of their aircraft, but was lost during the operation and never recovered.
- Approximately 350 search and rescue dogs worked at the World Trade Center site following the September 11, 2001 attacks. Rescuers relied on the dogs' sense of smell and agility in tight spaces to seek survivors and recover the remains of victims.
  - Ana, the first of the first responder dogs at the World Trade Center.
  - Apollo, a search and rescue dog who worked at World Trade Center site following the 11 September 2001 attacks.
  - Bretagne, a Golden Retriever search and rescue dog, believed to have been the last surviving rescue dog of the World Trade Center attacks when she was euthanized on 6 June 2016, at age 16, following kidney failure.
  - Jake, a black Labrador who served as a search and rescue dog following the 11 September 2001 attacks and Hurricane Katrina.
  - Trakr, a German Shepherd survivor detection dog who found the last survivor of the World Trade Center attack on 11 September 2001.

=== Guide, service, and facility dogs ===
- Buddy, a female German Shepherd, the first formally trained guide dog in the United States. She belonged to Morris Frank, who worked to establish The Seeing Eye, the first dog guide school in America.
- Endal, a yellow Labrador Retriever service dog voted "Dog of the Millennium", famous for his extraordinary ability to help his human partner, a disabled veteran, with many aspects of his life, for over a decade, and his role in the promotion of service dog programs.
- Orca, a Golden Retriever assistance dog awarded a PDSA Gold Medal for saving his owner's life.
- Professor Beauregard Tirebiter, University of Southern California's Official Wellness Dog. Beau is USC's first full-time canine faculty member and comes from a "hypoallergenic" mix between a Golden Retriever and a Poodle, also widely known as a "Goldendoodle". Beau is professionally trained as a facility dog and creates well-being throughout his facility, USC.
- Roselle, a Labrador Retriever guide dog who led her blind owner Michael Hingson to safety from the 78th floor of the North Tower of the World Trade Center after the 9/11 attack.
- Salty, a Labrador Retriever guide dog who led his blind owner Omar Rivera from the 71st floor of Tower 1 of the World Trade Center on 9/11.
- Sully, former President George H. W. Bush's yellow Labrador Retriever service dog during his last six months of life. Noted for his role during the President's state funeral. Subsequently, serving at the Walter Reed National Military Medical Center.
- Trixie Koontz, the Golden Retriever companion of Dean Koontz, was a retired guide dog and the purported author of Life Is Good. Trixie died 30 June 2007 at home, euthanized on her favorite couch with Koontz and his wife holding her in their arms. She had a tumor in her heart.
- Wanda the Yellow Retriever/Lab cross, guide dog to Mhairi Thurston. Wanda was The Guide Dogs for the Blind Association's first 'Overall Guidedog of the Year' in 2004. Wanda retired from service in 2011 and lived a happy retirement with owner Mhairi in Dundee, Scotland until her death in 2017.

=== Dogs that aided exploration ===
- Bothie, a Jack Russell Terrier who was the first dog to travel to both the South and North Poles.
- Bud, part of the first automobile trip across the United States in 1903.
- Chinook was the dog team leader for the Byrd Antarctic Expeditions and dubbed an "All American Dog" in the 1920s.
- Laika, aka Kudryavka, a Russian stray was the first animal to orbit the Earth, in 1957.
- Leoncico ("Little Lion"), was the dog of the Spanish explorer and conquistador Vasco Núñez de Balboa, exploring and struggling with him across the Isthmus of Panama, from the Atlantic Ocean to the Pacific, in 1513.
- Obersten ("The Colonel"), a Greenland Dog who was a part of Roald Amundsen's expedition to the South Pole. He was one of eleven dogs that survived and returned. He was brought home by Oscar Wisting and spent the rest of his life as his family pet. He is mounted and exhibited at the Holmenkollen ski museum.
- Seaman, Meriwether Lewis's Newfoundland who accompanied the Lewis and Clark Expedition from the Mississippi River to the Pacific coast in modern Oregon, across the northwestern U.S., from 1804 to 1806. He protected them from bears and buffalo, and was popular with the Native Americans they came in contact with.
- Taro and Jiro, two out of 15 Sakhalin Huskies who survived eleven months overwinter after being left behind in Antarctica, following the evacuation of the 1958 Japanese Antarctic Research Expedition.

=== Police dogs ===
- Agata, a decorated Colombian Labrador detection dog who was so effective in detecting drugs that a bounty of $10,000 was offered.
- Diesel, a Belgian Malinois RAID assault dog deployed by the French police, was killed in a shootout with suspected terrorists in the Saint-Denis area of Paris, while searching for suspects involved in the November 2015 Paris attacks.
- Finn, a German Shepherd of the Hertfordshire Constabulary in England. In 2016, Finn and his handler were both stabbed; the case started a campaign to improve legal protection for public service animals, resulting in a 2019 act of parliament known as "Finn's Law".
- Kántor, a German Shepherd of the Hungarian police, the most successful police dog ever in service from 1954 to 1963. He died after stepping on a landmine on the Austrian border, which was heavily fortified at the time. His body is preserved at the Rendőrmúzeum, the Hungarian national police service's museum in Budapest.
- K9 Big Wolf - See #Faithful after owner's death
- Rajah, a German Shepherd, was the first police dog to serve in New Zealand.
- Sirius, a Labrador Retriever explosive detection police dog of the Port Authority of New York and New Jersey Police Department was the only documented canine fatality during the September 11 attacks.
- Sombra, a German Shepherd detection dog, of the National Police of Colombia is credited for over 200 arrests and the seizure of over 9 tons of illegal drugs. The Clan del Golfo paramilitary group placed a bounty on her life.
- Zanjeer was a Labrador Retriever who served as a detection dog with the Mumbai Police in Maharashtra state of India. Due to his impeccable service detecting many explosives and other weapons—in particular during the 1993 Mumbai bombings—he was honoured with a full state funeral.
- Zuyaqui, a German Shepherd who served the Mexican Federal Police; his body is preserved at the Museo del Enervante drug-trafficking museum.

=== Other working dogs ===
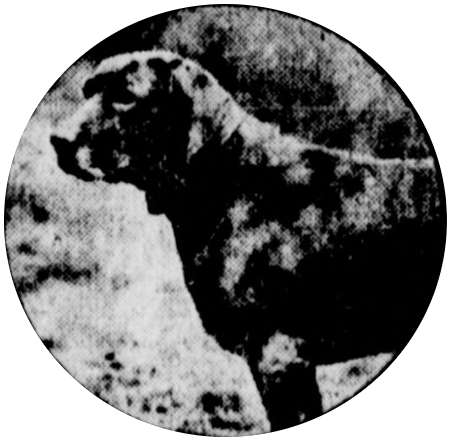
Don the Talking Dog, image published in The Evening World, 10 July 1912

- Basil and Budgie, pitbull terrier bitches who fronted deathgrind band Caninus. The dogs provided lead vocals on three albums between 2004 and 2005.
- Bunkō, a Japanese 'firefighting dog' who lived with and assisted the Otaru Fire Service during the early 20th century.
- Don, aka Don the Talking Dog, who vocalized several words.
- Gabi, a German Shepherd who worked as a guard dog at the Belgrade Zoo and managed to defeat an escaped jaguar.
- Hansel, a 'firefighting dog' and first pit bull arson detection K-9 in the U.S. The dog's handler is New Jersey firefighter Tyler Van Leer of the Van Leers.
- Help, a Scotch Collie who collected for the Orphans Fund of the Amalgamated Society of Railway Servants.
- K9 Killer, a Belgian Malinois dog that works with the Kruger National Park's Special Operations team to prevent rhinoceros poachers in South Africa; awarded a PDSA Gold Medal.
- Lucky and Flo, a pair of black Labrador Retriever detection dogs, notable for being the first animals trained to detect optical discs by scent. They are sponsored by the MPAA and FACT, as part of an initiative to combat copyright infringement relating to motion pictures and DVD discs.
- Oscar, a.k.a. "Hypnodog", a black Labrador Retriever, famous for performing as a "canine hypnotist".
- Owney, an official United States Postal Service dog and mascot, rode the trains with the mail in the 19th century, traveled around the world and more than 143,000 miles (230,000 km) in his lifetime. After death, his body was stuffed and is on display in the National Postal Museum in Washington, D.C. Featured on a Forever Stamp, and subject of many books.
- Sirrah, a black Border Collie, who herded sheep with James Hogg, the "Ettrick Shepherd," in Scotland in the early 1800s.
- Smoky, a Yorkshire Terrier, the first therapy dog.
- Station Jim, a popular and successful collector for the Widows' and Orphans' fund of the Great Western Railway.

== Other heroic dogs ==
Not all dogs that are famous for saving lives are working dogs. Famous lifesaving dogs with no special training or job include the following:

=== Saved abandoned babies ===
- Jade, a German Shepherd from Birmingham, England, who saved an abandoned baby. He was walking in a park with his owner when he ran off and laid down, not moving until his master approached, next to an abandoned baby in a bag in the woods. Jade's owner called an ambulance, which took the baby to the hospital, and the baby was saved.
- La China, a free-ranging dog who heard the cries of a newborn infant that had been exposed by her mother in a field near a shanty town outside of Buenos Aires, Argentina. La China found the baby and, without leaving any bite marks on her, brought her back to the relative shelter and warmth of a corner where she was keeping and nursing her litter of puppies. In so doing, La China had brought the baby close enough to people to be heard and saved.
- Mkombozi, a stray dog from the outskirts of Nairobi, Kenya, saved the life of an abandoned baby. On 9 May 2005, Mkombozi while scavenging for food along a road, found an abandoned baby in a package. She dragged it across a road, pulled it through a fence, into a village, to a shed where she was nursing newborn puppies. In doing so, she had brought the baby close enough for its cries to be heard by a woman and her children, who saved the baby. The baby was given the name "Angel" and adopted. The dog was named "Mkombozi", which is Swahili for "savior", and taken in by the local SPCA.

=== Others ===
- Bruno, a seven years old molecular bloodhound belonging to the Endas canine unit, an Italian sports promotion association. Bruno had saved nine lives and had even received a commendation from Italian Prime Minister Giorgia Meloni. He was found dead in Taranto on 4 July 2025, killed by unknown assailants using sausages laced with nails.
- Buddy, a German Shepherd, was hailed as a hero in 2010 for guiding Alaska State Troopers through winding back roads to a fire at his owners' workshop when their GPS had stopped working.
- Buford, a 6 year old Anatolian Pyrenees mix ranch dog rescued a 2-year-old named Boden Allen. On 15 April 2025, a 2-year-old toddler wandered about 7 miles (11 km) into the Arizona wilderness, and slept overnight in the woods. Buford found the child during his morning patrol in the area and guided him safely the last miles back to his owner's property, where rancher Scotty Dunton rescued the boy about 16 hours after he went missing.
- Darby, an American Pitbull Terrier who fought off a shark who attacked his owner. James White was fishing at Bodega Bay, when he was bitten on the leg by a sevengill shark. Darby escaped from White's parked car and pulled the shark off of his leg.
- Duke, a mixed-breed rescue dog in Portland, Connecticut who had been with his family for six years, saved the life of 9-week-old Harper Brousseau. On the night of 7 October 2012, Duke jumped into the Brousseau's bed and began shaking uncontrollably. This caused the Brousseaus to wake up and get out of bed. Upon checking on their daughter, they found she had stopped breathing. They then called 911 and the paramedics were able to revive Harper.
- Eeyore, a 100-pound rescue dog from Destin, Florida. On 25 September 2025, his owner's 86-year-old mother was injured in fall during a late night dog walk in a golf course. After not returning home for over an hour, the woman's husband called police to help search for the missing woman. Eeyore went off to catch the attention of a police officer and lead them through the dark golf course to the fallen woman.
- Flash, a German Shepherd, was a two-year-old loyal companion donated to the war on 10 September 1942, by Eleanor (Hildenbrand) and Paul F. Demerski. He was honored for his services and awards by the Syracuse Herald Journal newspaper. Dogs for Defense out of Washington D.C. awarded Flash for his bravery and loyalty in the field during World War II. He began his service at the train station in Solvay, New York, and continued on to Hicksville, Long Island, then deployed with his handlers. Mr. and Mrs. Demerski received a letter to inform them of Flash's completion of sentry duty training for the army located at the War Dog Reception and Training Center, Quartermaster Depot, Front Royal, Virginia.
- George, a Jack Russell Terrier who shielded a group of children in Manaia, New Zealand, from a pair of attacking pit bulls. He was killed by the pit bulls.
- Gnarley, an American Staffordshire Terrier mix from Sunbright, Tennessee, saved his owner's life when his coworker and roommate attacked him with a machete while working out of state on 26 July 2019. Gnarley made a full recovery from his injuries. An emergency surgery for a fractured skull and long laceration was needed.
- Kabang, a shepherd mix Aspin from Zamboanga City, Philippines who became famous when she saved two children from a potentially fatal motorcycle crash. As a result of the accident, Kabang lost her upper snout.
- Leo, a Dachshund, on 9 March 2014, in the city of Pančevo, Serbia, saved the life of an 11-year-old girl from an attacking Bullmastiff. He weighed 12 kg, and the Bullmastiff weighed 50 kg. After the fight, Leo had a broken pelvis, distended intestines, and was completely crushed. He succumbed to his injuries after two days. The city of Pančevo erected a monument in the park where the owners constantly sat. The monument reads: For all the little heroes with big hearts.
- Lilly, an American Pit Bull Terrier who dragged her owner to safety after she collapsed on the tracks in front of an oncoming train. Her owner was unharmed, but Lilly's right front leg needed to be amputated. She made a full recovery and lived to be 15, passing away peacefully in 2018.
- Lucy, a pit bull who shielded her owner's mother-in-law from an ex-boyfriend with a knife. The man stabbed Lucy multiple times, and she died on 19 December 2015, after going into cardiac arrest from blood loss.
- Orion, a dog, was officially recognized for his role in rescuing people during the Vargas tragedy. A mudslide forced Orion and his owner Mauricio Pérez to leave their home and go to a safer place. They came across a young girl trapped by turbulent water. Orion guided the girl to shore by swimming at her side, then jumped back in to pull a second girl out of the water. He then helped eight children climb to high places. He spent Wednesday night and part of Thursday morning saving 37 people from drowning. He was awarded a medal of valour and a certificate for the role he played.
- Polo, a 6-year-old mixed breed in Baltimore, Maryland, who saved the life of 8-month-old Vivian Poremski. On 15 August 2016, a candle sparked a fast-moving fire in the Poremski home while the mother had stepped out to retrieve an item from her car. Polo protected Vivian from the flames by lying on top of her, dying in the process.
- Saihu (赛虎 = "like a tiger"), from Jiujiang, Jiangxi Province, southern China. On 28 November 2003, a chef was preparing dinner for almost 30 people at a driving school. The smell of the cooking meat attracted some nearby puppies to the school, along with their mother, Saihu. The chef threw some scraps of meat from the pot to the puppies, but strangely, the puppies' mother prevented them from eating. Saihu also kept barking at the chef, as well as the people who were preparing to eat. Confused but undeterred, the people prepared to eat the meal the chef had made. Saihu became panicked and ran around barking at the guests, before finally eating all the scraps the chef had thrown to the dogs. After just a few minutes, Saihu fell dead on the floor. The guests, shocked at the dog's death, stopped eating the meal. They called a policeman as well as some doctors, who discovered poison in the meat. No people or puppies died. Everyone was convinced that Saihu must have smelled the poison and had saved the people and her puppies by sacrificing herself. The people of Jiujaing were so grateful to Saihu that they set up a tomb in a human graveyard and a statue to memorialize the dog.
- Susie, part Pit Bull, rescued after being set on fire in Greensboro, North Carolina; her plight led to passage of Susie's Law.
- Velvet, a black Labrador Retriever and shepherd mixed breed cattle dog, who helped save three climbers when they became stranded on Mount Hood in Oregon on 18 February 2007.
- Wangwang (汪汪 Wāngwāng, meaning "wuff wuff"), a dog member of a Chang (張) family in Taipei who woke the family in a night fire. The family woke their neighbors and saved about 30 lives.
- Willie, Labrador Retriever, who saved six-year-old John Stenglein from a wolf attack at a logging camp nearby on 26 April 2000 in Icy Bay, Alaska. John and an older boy were playing near the edge of a logging camp when a wolf appeared and chased the boys, attacking John when he fell and dragging him towards the woods. Many came running, but only Willie arrived in time to confront the wolf, causing it to drop John before it could make off with him.

== Real dogs in literature ==
- Beautiful Joe, an abused Airedale who was rescued from a brutal master, inspired an 1894 bestselling novel of the same name.
- Charley, a poodle owned by John Steinbeck, was made famous by the book Travels With Charley.
- Endal; a paperback book entitled Endal, published by HarperCollins, was released on 9 February 2009 and went straight to Number 5 in the UK Paperback bestsellers list.
- Jock of the Bushveld, a Staffordshire Bull Terrier from South Africa in the 1880s, whose owner wrote a book about their travels together.
- Lad, a Rough Collie made famous by three of the novels, including Lad, A Dog, written by owner Albert Payson Terhune.
- Marley, a yellow Labrador Retriever, was featured in the memoir Marley and Me.
- Rin Tin Tin, the famous German Shepherd dog actor who had films written for him and who was the subject of the 2007 film Finding Rin Tin Tin.
- Seaman, the Newfoundland who travelled across the continent with the Lewis and Clark Expedition, has been the subject of a number of children's books.
- Stickeen, a companion of John Muir in 1880s Alaska. Muir wrote about him in Stickeen: An Adventure with a Dog and a Glacier, one of Muir's best-known writings.
- Tulip, J. R. Ackerley's German Shepherd, was the subject of Ackerley's 1956 memoir My Dog Tulip, based on his relationship with his own dog Queenie; adapted as the 2009 animated feature film of the same name.
- Wheely Willy, a paraplegic chihuahua who was the subject of two bestselling children's books.
- Zdreanță, Tudor Arghezi's pet dog, and the subject of a beloved eponymous children's poem.

== Mascots ==
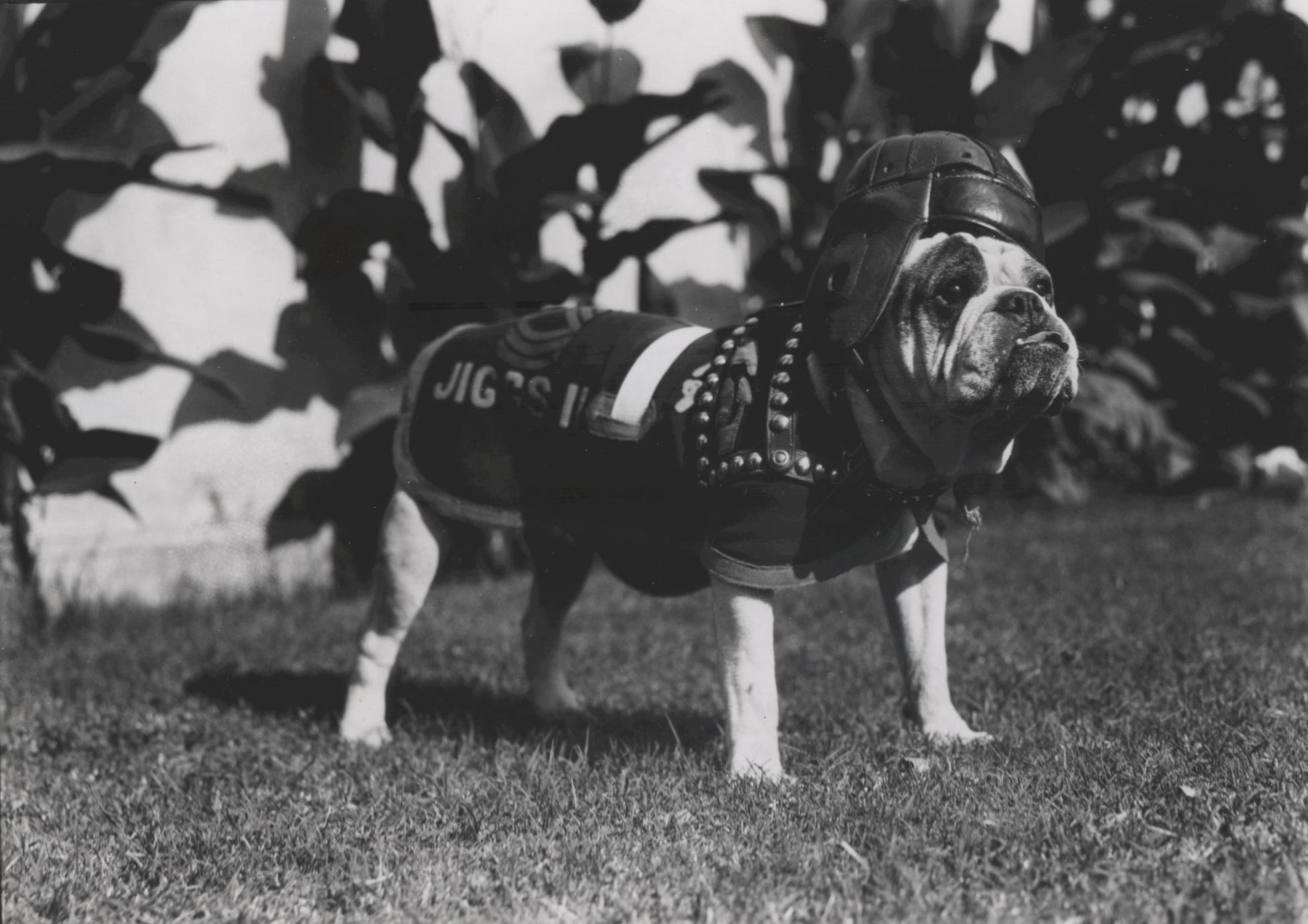
Jiggs II, USMC mascot, c. 1928

- Argo, a mixed-breed stray dog who wandered the ruins of Pompeii and was considered the site's mascot.
- Bamse, a St. Bernard who was a mascot to the Royal Norwegian Navy minesweeper Thorodd in WWII; became the heroic mascot of the Free Norwegian Forces.
- Bullseye, a Bull Terrier known for being the mascot of the Target Corporation.
- Bully, a Bulldog, is the Mississippi State University mascot.
- Butler Blue, a succession of English Bulldog mascots of Butler University from 2000 on.
- Chase "That Golden Thunder", a Golden Retriever, was the mascot of the Trenton Thunder.
- Chesty is the name given to the bulldogs who serve as the official mascot of the United States Marine Corps. They are named after Marine Corps legend Lieutenant General Chesty Puller.
- George Tirebiter, former mascot of the University of Southern California.
- Griff, a succession of English Bulldog mascots of Drake University from 2015 on.
- Handsome Dan, a bulldog, is the Yale University mascot.
- Hank, unofficial mascot of the Milwaukee Brewers.
- Jack the Bulldog is the mascot of Georgetown University.
- Jiggs II, a.k.a. Sergeant Major Jiggs II, a.k.a. Silent White Richard, was the second of several English bulldogs to serve as mascots of the United States Marine Corps.
- Jonathan, a husky, is the University of Connecticut's mascot, and is named after the state of Connecticut's first governor.
- Rascal, a mongrel dog, mascot of Cumberland Law School, who attended classes beginning in 1933 and, in 1937, was awarded the degree of doctor of canine jurisprudence.
- Reveille, a Rough Collie, the mascot for Texas A&M University.
- Smokey, mascot of the University of Tennessee.
- Smoky, mascot of the 1932 Summer Olympic Village and later the event as a whole, often considered the first Olympic mascot.
- Spuds MacKenzie, a Bull Terrier mascot for Bud Light.
- Uga, a bulldog, serves as mascot for the University of Georgia.
- Zeke the Wonder Dog, a Labrador Retriever, serves as a mascot for Michigan State University.

== Models ==
- Boo, a Pomeranian and social media icon with the tagline of "World's Cutest Dog".
- Man Ray and Fay Ray, Weimaraners, subjects of their owner, photographer William Wegman.
- Mickey, an Irish Wolfhound, and Cracker, a Bull Terrier, acquired in 1925 by Cecil Aldin and the models for his popular book, Sleeping Partners, which humorously illustrated the dogs’ habit of sleeping on, under, around, or tangled up with each other.
- Mr. Winkle, a very small dog of uncertain breed, belongs to Lara Jo Regan, who has published many photos of Mr. Winkle in various costumes and poses.

== Dogs in science ==
- Bonn–Oberkassel dog, a prehistoric dog in Germany.
- Brown Dog, killed after vivisection in February 1903. A memorial statue provoked riots.
- Ch. Fiacre's First and Foremost, low uric acid show dog.
- Marjorie, a depancreatized dog, was the subject of experiments by Frederick Banting and his assistant, Charles Best. Marjorie was kept alive for about 70 days on pancreas extract, which was the first success in the doctors' effort to uncover a means to control diabetes. Ultimately, this led Banting and Best to isolate insulin.
- Pavlov's dogs, who were subjects of Pavlov's research on classical conditioning.
- Snuppy, an Afghan Hound, was the first cloned dog.

=== Space dogs ===
The Soviets favored dogs for early space flights, as opposed to the Americans, who preferred monkeys and chimpanzees.

- In 1951 Dezik and Tsygan became the first dogs to enter suborbital spaceflight.
- In 1957 Laika, a female mixed-breed dog, became the first animal to enter orbit when she was launched into space aboard Sputnik 2. Laika's presence led to the mission being dubbed "Muttnik". She was also the first to die in orbit, as no provision was made to return her to the ground.
- In 1960 Belka and Strelka, two Russian mixed breeds, went into space aboard Sputnik 5 and returned. They were, along with their mice, rats, and rabbit traveling companions, the first animals to survive an orbital flight. Strelka later gave birth to a litter of puppies, one of which, Pushinka, was given to U.S. president John F. Kennedy's daughter Caroline by Soviet Premier Nikita Khrushchev.

== Dogs of unusual size ==
=== Small dogs ===
- Boo Boo, a female Chihuahua, was listed in the 2007 Guinness World Records as the smallest living dog in terms of height.
- Heaven Sent Brandy, a female Chihuahua, is listed in the 2007 Guinness World Records as the smallest living dog in terms of length. She set the record on 31 January 2005, at 15 centimetres (6 in) long, from her nose to the tip of her tail.
- Sylvia, a matchbox-size Yorkshire Terrier owned by Arthur Marples of Blackburn, England, was the smallest dog in recorded history. The dog died in 1945 when she was almost two years old, at which point she stood 6 centimetres (2.4 in) tall at the shoulder, measured 9 centimetres (3.5 in) from nose tip to tail, and weighed 0.11 kilograms (3.9 oz).

=== Heavy dogs ===
- Benedictine, a male Saint Bernard, who weighed 162 kilograms (357 lb) is recognized as the heaviest dog to have ever lived.
- Zorba, a male English Mastiff, was recognized by Guinness World Records as the heaviest dog in the world at 155.6 kilograms (343 lb). The record was set in November 1989, when Zorba was 8 years old. Zorba also held a record for the world's longest dog at 2.5 metres (8.2 ft).

=== Tall dogs ===
- Giant George, a blue Great Dane that took over Gibson's record as the tallest living dog, measuring 109 cm (43 in) from paw to shoulder; 220 cm (7.2 ft) from head to tail.
- Gibson, a Harlequin Great Dane who was the world's tallest dog until his death in August 2009. Gibson was certified by Guinness World Records as the tallest living dog at 107 centimetres (42.1 in). Standing on his hind legs, the 77 kilograms (170 lb) dog was over 2.13 metres (7 ft) tall.
- Titan, a Great Dane who was previously recognised as the world's tallest dog.
- Zeus, a Great Dane who claimed the tallest dog record on 13 September 2012.

== Intelligent dogs ==
- Betsy, one of the most intelligent dogs, who knows over 340 words.
- Chaser, a Border Collie, had a vocabulary of 1,022 words, could reason by exclusion, and could recognise objects by the groups they belong to.
- Donnie, a Doberman Pinscher featured on the National Geographic Channel show Dog Genius for his penchant for arranging his toys in geometric forms.
- Jim the Wonder Dog, an intelligent dog honored by a statue in Marshall, Missouri.
- Rico could recognize the names of more than 250 toys and fetch them on command.

== Long-lived dogs ==
- Bluey, an Australian Cattle Dog who was verified as the world's oldest dog by Guinness World Records. She died in 1939 at 29 years and 5 months of age.
- Bobi, a Rafeiro do Alentejo who was claimed to be the oldest dog ever. He died in 2023 at a claimed age of 31 years, 165 days.
- Bramble, a Welsh Collie who lived a vegan diet to 25 years old and at the time of her death was the world's oldest dog.
- Chanel, a Dachshund, who was the world's oldest dog in 2009 at 21 years old,
- Max, a Beagle, Dachshund and terrier mix, unverified to have lived to the age of 29 years and 282 days.
- Spike, a Chihuahua mix, who is the oldest living dog as of 17 March 2025, reaching the age of 25.
- Uncle Chichi, who was between 24 and 26. Adopted from a shelter in South Carolina, he was unofficially the oldest dog in the world at the time of his death. His true age could not be determined due to lost birth records.

== Show dogs ==
- Araki Fabulous Willy, a Tibetan Terrier who was Best in Show at Crufts in 2007.
- Canigou Cambrai, an English Cocker Spaniel who was Best in Show at Crufts in 1996.
- My Own Brucie, an American Cocker Spaniel show dog.
- Pulaski's Masterpiece, a Toy Poodle that disappeared on 29 May 1953.
- Tickle Em Jock, the first Scottish Terrier to win Best in Show at the Westminster Kennel Club Dog Show.
- Warren Remedy, a Smooth Fox Terrier, the first dog to win Best in Show at the Westminster Kennel Club Dog Show and the only dog to win Best in Show three times in 1907, 1908, and 1909 respectively.
- Yakee A Dangerous Liaison, a Pekingese who was Best in Show at Crufts in 2003.

== Notorious dogs ==
- Bane and Hera, a pair of Presa Canarios owned by Marjorie Knoller and Robert Noel that were involved in the death of Diane Whipple.
- Buddha, a Scottish pug trained to give a Nazi salute as a joke by the boyfriend of its owner, Suzanne Kelly. After filming the act and distributing it on YouTube, the boyfriend, Mark Meechan, was found guilty of a hate crime under UK's Communications Act 2003.
- Dempsey, condemned to death under the United Kingdom's Dangerous Dogs Act 1991 but finally reprieved after three years of legal battles.
- Dormie, a purebred Airedale Terrier accused of "murdering" 14 cats, resulting in a sensational and landmark 1921 California trial by jury.
- Jackie, a Dalmatian mix whose ability to give a Nazi salute garnered negative attention from Nazi Germany in World War II.
- Pep, a Labrador Retriever that was sent to the Eastern State Penitentiary by Pennsylvania governor Gifford Pinchot and falsely accused of murdering a cat.

== Ugly dogs ==
- Elwood, a Chinese Crested–Chihuahua, mixed breed, was a winner of the World's Ugliest Dog Contest in 2007.
- Miss Ellie, a blind Chinese Crested dog that won the pedigree section of the World's Ugliest Dog Contest in 2009.
- Peggy, a dog that won the title of "Britain's ugliest dog".
- Sam, a blind Chinese Crested hairless, was the three-time winner of the World's Ugliest Dog Contest.

== Unique dogs ==
- Faith, a bipedal dog.
- Heart-kun is a Chihuahua in Japan born with a heart-shaped patch of brown hair on its white coated body.

== Foundation sires and early dogs ==
- Abuwtiyuw, one of the earliest dogs whose name is known.
- Horand von Grafrath, the first registered German Shepherd, and the foundation sire of the breed.
- Huddersfield Ben, an early Yorkshire Terrier, is universally regarded as the foundation sire of the breed.
- Obo II, foundation sire for all American Cocker Spaniels.
- Old Hemp, an early Border Collie.
- Old Jock, an early Fox Terrier.

== Other notable dogs ==
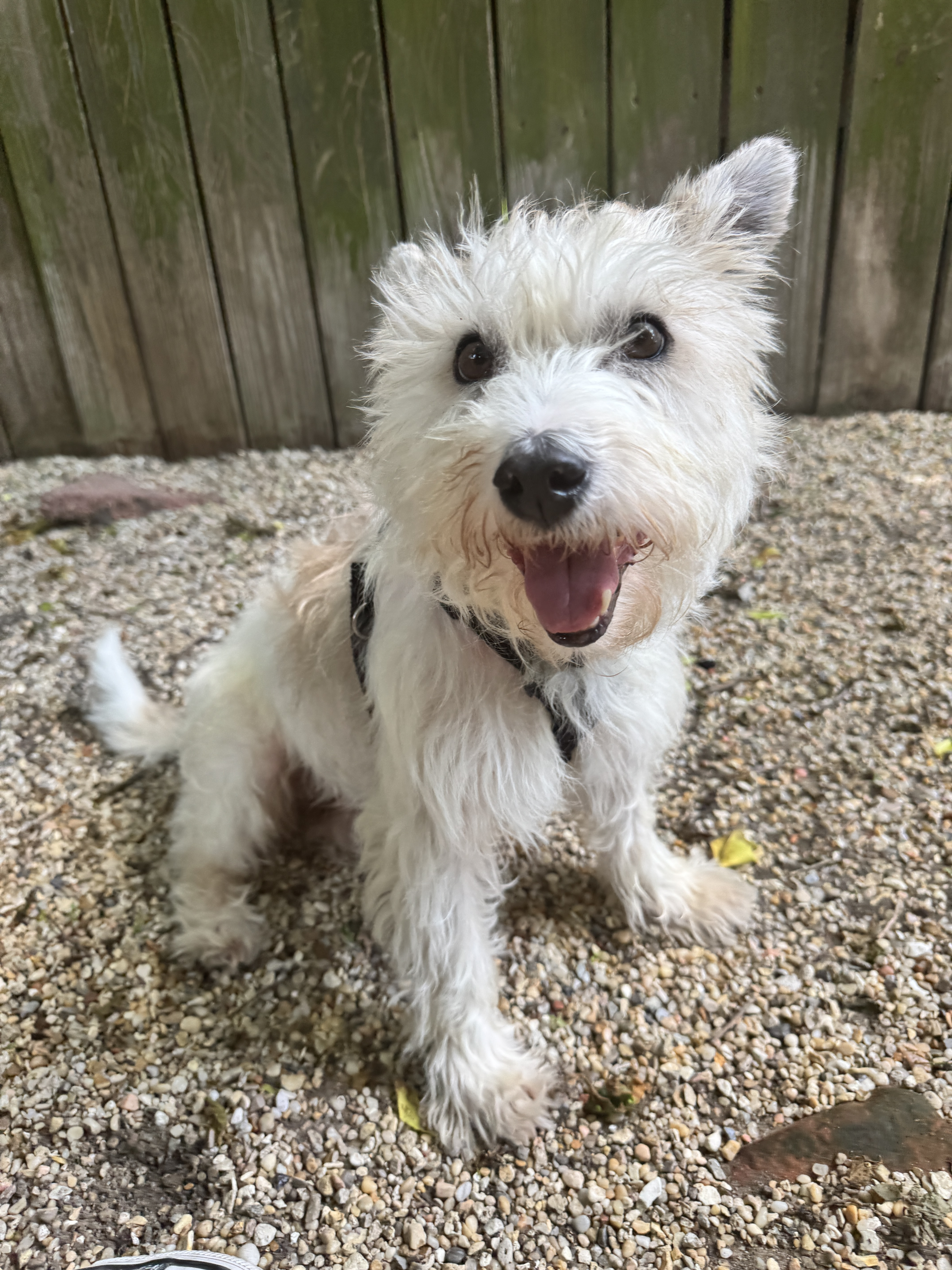
Scrim, a mixed breed rescue who twice escaped from potential homes and eluded capture for almost a year.

- Aloka, rescue dog of Indian origin and companion of Buddhist monks in the United States.
- Auditor, a feral dog who lived in the mining area of Butte, Montana.
- Balltze, a Shiba Inu from Hong Kong and face of the "Cheems" meme.
- Baltic, whose rescue on the Baltic Sea received worldwide attention, became the mascot and "crew-member" of Baltica, the Polish research vessel that rescued him.
- Bear, an English Springer Spaniel who became famous in 2017 when he was rescued from a river in Kitchener, Ontario, by Dillon Ross. Ross, who was in the middle of his wedding photo session, jumped into the river in his wedding suit to save the dog after it got into trouble while chasing ducks.
- Bella, a Shih Tzu owned by 17 year old Mia Leimberg, that accompanied her while she was held captive by Hamas and later freed in exchange of Palestinian prisoners.
- Bum, a three-footed St. Bernard and Spaniel mix stray who became the 19th-century town dog of San Diego.
- Bummer and Lazarus, a pair of famous stray dogs who lived in San Francisco during the 1860s, often associated with Emperor Norton.
- Chombueng, a Thai Bangkaew Dog who became famous in 2019 after being rescued by marathon runner Khemjira Klongsanun. During a 42-km race in Thailand, Klongsanun found the abandoned puppy and carried him for 30 km to the finish line, later adopting him.
- Docile, accompanied Norwegian national football team manager Egil Olsen.
- Dog on the Tuckerbox.
- Dozer, a male Goldendoodle, who raised $25,000 for the University of Maryland Greenebaum Cancer Center by joining the Maryland Half Marathon and crossing the finish line on Sunday, 15 May 2011.
- Eclipse, a female Mastador (half Mastiff, half Labrador) who independently rode a bus from a bus stop near her home to a dog park in downtown Seattle and back. She has become a favorite among commuters.
- Fenix Lumiere, a husky mix with cerebellar hypoplasia known for his distinctive prancing gait. With over 3.6 million followers across TikTok, Instagram, and Facebook, he gained widespread attention when actor Kevin Bacon reposted his video in 2021. His friendship with a wild sea lion named Wilbur attracted additional media coverage in 2026.
- Jonas, a mongrel dog who saved his owner's life from a possible drowning in December 2017.
- Jorge, a mixed-breed stray dog from Tbilisi, Georgia, who was reunited with his owner, Giorgi Bereziani, in 2018 after being missing for three years. The reunion, captured on video, became viral after Bereziani found Jorge wandering near an opera house following a tip from local workers.
- Joy, a Spaniel, belonging to the Alexei Nikolaevich, with whom he often appears in photographs and from whom he was inseparable. Alexei was executed at the age of 13 with the rest of his family at Ekaterinburg in 1918. Joy was the only survivor of the massacre and was discovered wandering in the grounds of the house shortly after by White Russians who briefly occupied the town too late to rescue the Romanovs. Joy was taken by one of them into exile in Britain where he died at Windsor several years later, still pining for his young master.
- Kabosu, a female Shiba Inu most known as the face of Doge.
- Kalu, a dog rescued and rehabilitated by the nonprofit animal rescue organization Animal Aid Unlimited after he was found at a construction site in Udaipur, India with almost his entire face destroyed by maggots. The organization makes videos of their rescues, and this went viral due to the horrible injury and his miraculous recovery. After his recovery, he lived the rest of his life happily and healthily at Animal Aid Unlimited. He died of a sudden heart attack in September 2018.
- Kratu, a rescue dog from Romania, whose appearances at Crufts became a viral phenomenon.
- Lila, British General Howe's Fox Terrier who wandered off during the 1777 Battle of Germantown; the dog was recovered by American troops and was fed, cleaned and brushed before being returned to the British camp under a flag of truce, with a cordial note from General Washington.
- Loukanikos, a dog who was active during Anti-austerity movement in Greece, from 2010 through 2012. He was featured in the Time Person of the Year 2011 issue.
- Maggie, a mixed-breed dog from California who became an internet sensation in 2021. After being diagnosed with terminal bone cancer, her owner, Gretchen Bayne, took her to her favorite beach to watch the sunset one last time while resting on a bed with pillows and blankets.
- Malchik, a mongrel street dog who resided in the Moscow Metro, and whose stabbing death sparked a public outcry.
- Manchinha, a female mixed-breed dog who was beaten and poisoned to death by an employee of Carrefour Brazil.
- Manny the Frenchie, American French Bulldog that achieved Internet celebrity via the posting of his photographs on various social media websites.
- Max, an English Springer Spaniel who was the first pet dog to be awarded the PDSA Order of Merit.
- Mishka, a Siberian Husky. Mishka has a YouTube channel with over 500 videos. Mishka became popular from a video of her saying "I love you." Mishka has made several appearances on TV talk shows.
- Natividad, an emaciated stray dog featured in a controversial display by artist Guillermo Vargas Habacuc in the Visual Arts Biennial of Central America, later the subject of widespread rumours on the Internet that he was starved to death by the artist.
- Negro Matapacos, a dog who participated at many street demonstrations in Santiago, Chile.
- Orelha, a community dog supposedly killed in Praia Brava, a neighborhood in northern Florianópolis, Brazil. After five months of investigation, prosecutors found that the main hypothesis for Orelha's death was a serious medical condition, not aggression, since he did not present cuts, tears, or fractures, and no evident signs of mistreatment.
- Oscar, a Pug belonging to a professor at Virginia Commonwealth University, was the center of public controversy after his owner assigned an advertising class to make the dog famous.
- Paddy the Wanderer, an Airedale Terrier who roamed the streets of Wellington, New Zealand during the Great Depression and was known for taking trips on visiting ships.
- Peanut Butter, a Shiba Inu trained by speedrunner JSR to press buttons on a special-built video game controller. Called the world's first speedrunning dog, Peanut Butter has appeared at two Games Done Quick events, playing Gyromite and Ken Griffey Jr. Presents: Major League Baseball for the Nintendo Entertainment System.
- Pickles, discovered the Jules Rimet trophy (the Football World Cup) after it had been stolen in England in 1966.
- Pickles, a dog often cited as the name origin for the sport of pickleball.
- Presley, the boxer, won the title of the Greatest American Dog in the 2008 CBS television show of the same name.
- Preta, a pregnant black dog tied to the bumper of a car and dragged through the Brazilian city of Pelotas in 2005
- Red Dog, a kelpie–cattle dog cross who travelled around the Pilbara region of Western Australia from 1975 (when his truck-driver owner died), befriending many locals, until his death in 1979, believed to have been caused by deliberate strychnine poisoning.
- Rigel, erstwhile but perhaps mythical Newfoundland pet of first officer William Murdoch aboard the RMS Titanic. Murdoch went down with the ship, but Rigel swam for three hours next to a lifeboat until it was rescued by the RMS Carpathia. Rigel is renowned as a hero, alerting the Carpathia's captain of the weakened survivors before the ship hit them. Rigel was adopted by crewman Jonas Briggs.
- Robot, a dog who belonged to a boy named Simon, discovered the cave paintings at Lascaux in 1940.
- Rosie, an Australian Silky Terrier who saved her owners' lives during a house fire in Launceston, Tasmania in 2010.
- Sansão, whose hind legs where both severed in a case of animal cruelty in Brazil.
- Saucisse, a candidate at the 2001 election of mayor in Marseille and also a candidate in the TV reality show Secret Story 2009.
- Scrim, a mixed breed stray rescued from a New Orleans animal shelter who twice escaped potential homes and eluded capture for almost a year, becoming the subject of national news and an icon of New Orleans.
- Sensation, the English Pointer featured on the logo of the Westminster Kennel Club Dog Show.
- Simon, a Jindo, Miniature Pinscher, and Portuguese Podengo mix adopted by writer and animal rescue advocate Isabel Klee, who was known for helping to rehabilitate the dogs that Klee fostered.
- Star was a mixed-breed female pit bull who was shot by the New York City Police Department in 2012 while she was protecting her homeless owner, who was in the midst of a seizure. Star's shooting was captured on video, and went viral, leading to controversies over police handling of companion dogs.
- Tawny, a yellow Labrador Retriever who in 1999 gave birth to 18 puppies in her very first litter. For this she received the "Iams Mother of the Year" Award.
- Tika, an Italian Greyhound with a large social media following
- Tubby, a Cocker Spaniel, was the only fatality of the Tacoma Narrows Bridge disaster. Tubby died when the bridge fell and his body was never recovered.
- Tuna, a Chihuahua/Dachshund cross and internet celebrity.
- Whitney Chewston, a Dachshund originating on Instagram that later became known as the "Homophobic Dog" in internet meme culture.
- Willie, a handicapped Dachshund who was killed alongside his owner Barbara Weston in 1993. The discovery of his wheelchair alongside their skeletal remains in a septic pit three years later was pivotal in police identifying them, and bringing their killer Stephen Swaim to justice.
- Willie Bean, a Golden Retriever, was the focus of several political satires during 2008.
- Word, a male Lhasa Apso, was sentenced to death on 4 May 1993 following two biting incidents. He was incarcerated at the Seattle Animal Control Shelter for a total of eight years and 190 days before being released on 10 November 2001, which is the Guinness World Record for the longest time on dog death row.

== Fame by proxy to a famous owner ==
Some dogs are made famous by frequently or prominently appearing in the media with their famous owner.

=== Dogs of actors and entertainers ===
- Buster, a Shih Tzu owned by British television presenter Paul O'Grady.
- Chalky, a Jack Russell Terrier belonging to English chef and presenter Rick Stein.
- Commissioner, a Dachshund whose mistress was actress Carole Lombard. Commissioner ignored Clark Gable completely. After Lombard's death in 1942, the dog would not leave Gable's side.
- Gary, a French Bulldog, companion of the late Carrie Fisher.
- Giggy, a Pomeranian belonging to London-born Beverly Hills businesswomen and television personality (The Real Housewives of Beverly Hills, Vanderpump Rules), Lisa Vanderpump.
- Google, a Poodle whose master was actor, writer, director and producer Ben Hecht.
- Jazmín was a Yorkshire Terrier owned by popular Argentine television presenter Susana Giménez. Jazmín lived with Giménez, accompanied her on television, and in photographic productions and on her international trips.
- Meatball, an English Bulldog owned by Adam Sandler, starred in the short A Day with the Meatball.
- Mr. Famous, a Yorkshire Terrier owned by Audrey Hepburn, who made an appearance in the film Love in the Afternoon (1957).
- Olga, the dog who was owned by British television presenter Paul O'Grady.
- Pilaf, a long-haired Chihuahua owned by American actress and producer Demi Moore.
- Puffy, a Pomeranian belonging to London-born Beverly Hills businesswomen and television personality (The Real Housewives of Beverly Hills, Vanderpump Rules), Lisa Vanderpump.
- Schnorbitz, St Bernard owned by Bernie Winters, an English comedian and the comic foil of the double act Mike and Bernie Winters with his older brother, Mike. Winters later performed solo, often with the aid of his dog. Following his death, Winters bequeathed Schnorbitz to showman Richard De Vere.
- Spike, a Yorkshire Terrier was the former canine sidekick of television celebrity Joan Rivers. The corporate logo of Rivers' PGHM (Please God Help Me) Productions featured an image of her beloved Spike in a prayerful pose with a halo over his head.
- Sui, a Staffordshire Bull Terrier owned by Steve Irwin who was featured in The Crocodile Hunter series on Animal Planet.
- Tank, a Pit Bull mix, is owned by Sydney Sweeney and makes frequent appearances on her social media.
- Tinkerbell, Chihuahua of Paris Hilton, was featured on The Simple Life reality show.
- Vida, Model Gisele Bündchen's Yorkshire Terrier, has often been photographed with her famous owner.
- Zero was Humphrey Bogart's dog and appeared with him in High Sierra (1941).

=== Dogs of artists and designers ===
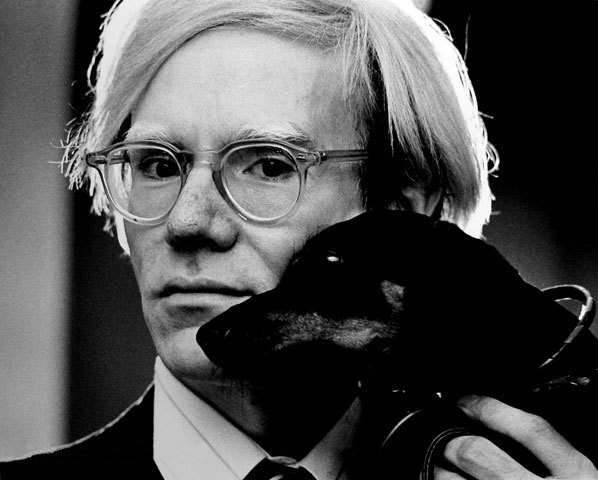
Archie's "15 minutes of fame" with Andy Warhol. Photo by Jack Mitchell, 1973

- Archie and Amos, Dachshunds owned by Andy Warhol and his partner Jed Johnson, were featured in Warhol's paintings and photographs. Warhol was often photographed with Archie and took him to his studio, art openings, and restaurants.
- David Hockney's dachshunds.
- Hazel, a Chihuahua, and Moujik, a French Bulldog owned by Yves Saint Laurent.
- Lump, a Dachshund owned by of a friend of Pablo Picasso, was featured in several Picasso paintings.
- Trump, William Hogarth's Pug, made several appearances in Hogarth's paintings, including two 1745 paintings, Painter and his Pug and Captain Lord George Graham in his Cabin.

=== Dogs of musicians ===
- Charlie and Bear, Celine Dion's Labradors. They were pictured in numerous magazines with the singer and her family.
- Jason and Towser, dogs belonging to John Entwistle and Pete Townshend (respectively) of The Who. The dogs' barking was captured on the track Dogs Part 2, an instrumental track written by drummer, Keith Moon. The writing credit is listed on the single as "Moon/Towser/Jason".
- Koji and Gustav, two of Lady Gaga's French Bulldogs, were stolen from their dogwalker, Ryan Fischer, while out for a walk in Los Angeles, California. Fischer was attacked and shot in the chest, severely wounding him. The dogs were found and returned to Gaga by Jennifer McBride, who was falsely accused of the crime, for a $500,000 reward. The true attackers were later found and arrested.
- Lolabelle, Laurie Anderson's Rat Terrier, is the major focus of her 2015 documentary film Heart of a Dog.
- Lou dog, a Dalmatian, Bradley Nowell's (Sublime's vocalist and guitarist) dog, often featured on the band's CD art.
- Martha, Paul McCartney's Old English Sheepdog, which inspired the Beatles' song "Martha My Dear".
- Mate, Miley Cyrus's German Shepherd, was named after her favorite Australian word, mate.
- Max, David Bowie's dog, has heterochromia, a condition frequently attributed to Bowie (who in reality had anisocoria).
- Mercy, Fiona Apple's dog, who contributed "vocals" to her 2020 album Fetch The Bolt Cutters, and features regularly in social media posts.
- Mina, Sir Edward Elgar's Cairn Terrier, after whom he named his final orchestral work.
- Mocha, Kelly Rowland's Yorkshire Terrier, was featured on an episode of Cribs on MTV.
- Sage, Jim Morrison's Shepherd mix, the dog owned by Jim Morrison from music group The Doors and his partner Pamela Courson.
- Seamus, the dog of singer Steve Marriott, can be heard on the Small Faces track "The Universal" and more prominently on the Pink Floyd track "Seamus".
- Strider, Robert Plant's dog, is the "blue-eyed merle" mentioned in the 1970 Led Zeppelin track "Bron-Y-Aur Stomp".
- Veela, Shirley Manson's dog, a terrier adopted from the streets of Los Angeles.
- Ziggy, Molly Meldrum's dog, played himself in the 2016 miniseries Molly. It is the fourth dog who Meldrum has named after the David Bowie character Ziggy Stardust

=== Dogs of political figures ===
- Babydog, pet English Bulldog of West Virginia Governor Jim Justice.
- Bailey, pet of U.S. senator Elizabeth Warren
- Blondi, Adolf Hitler's German Shepherd dog.
- Boye, Prince Rupert of the Rhine's poodle, who went into battle with him.
- Caesar, Fox Terrier owned by King Edward VII.
- Conan, an English Mastiff adopted by current Argentinian president Javier Milei, and cloned multiple times after his death.
- Dash, King Charles Spaniel owned by Queen Victoria.
- Dilyn, the Jack Russell cross of Boris Johnson.
- Dookie, the first of many Pembroke Welsh Corgis owned by Queen Elizabeth II.
- Dylan, pet Rough Collie of Argentinian president Alberto Fernández
- Foks, the first President of the Republic of Turkey Mustafa Kemal Atatürk’s dog.
- Konni, Russian President Vladimir Putin's Labrador Retriever.
- Lennu, the Boston Terrier dog of President of Finland Sauli Niinistö.
- Looty, the Pekingese dog looted from the Summer Palace and gifted to Queen Victoria.
- Lupo, an English Cocker Spaniel owned by William, Prince of Wales and Catherine, Princess of Wales.
- Nemo, a black Labrador Retriever-Griffon dog owned by French President Emmanuel Macron and Brigitte Macron.
- Orla, an English Cocker Spaniel owned by William, Prince of Wales and Catherine, Princess of Wales.
- Pat, Irish Terrier owned by former Canadian Prime Minister William Lyon Mackenzie King. After Pat died, King had séances to "communicate" with Pat.
- Resistência Lula da Silva, pet mongrel owned by Brazilian President Luiz Inácio Lula da Silva.
- Roland, the pet dog of Francis II Rákóczi.
- Seamus, Mitt Romney's Irish Setter, which was the subject of controversy during the 2008 US presidential election and the 2012 U.S. presidential election.
- Susan, Pembroke Corgi owned by Queen Elizabeth II. All of Queen Elizabeth's corgis descended from Susan.
- Sutter Brown, Pembroke Welsh Corgi pet of Governor of California Jerry Brown and his wife, Anne Gust Brown.
- Tongdaeng, a stray dog that was owned by King Rama IX of Thailand, he wrote a book about her in 2002.
- Ulk, a Great Dane owned by Chilean President Arturo Alessandri during his second presidency.

==== Dogs of U.S. presidents and their families ====
- Barney and Miss Beazley, President George W. Bush's Scottish Terriers.
- Bo and Sunny, President Barack Obama's Portuguese Water Dogs.
- Buddy, President Bill Clinton's chocolate Labrador Retriever.
- Champ, Major, and Commander, Joe and Jill Biden's German Shepherds. Major is the first shelter dog to live in the White House.
- Checkers, President Richard Nixon's Cocker Spaniel, was made famous in the Checkers speech.
- Dash, First Lady Caroline Harrison's collie mix.
- Fala, President Franklin D. Roosevelt's Scottish Terrier, was a gift from Roosevelt's cousin, Margaret Suckley. Fala is depicted in the Franklin Delano Roosevelt Memorial.
- Fido, family pet of President Abraham Lincoln.
- Him and Her, President Lyndon Johnson's Beagles, were famous for the public uproar Johnson caused by lifting them by their ears.
- Laddie Boy, a famous Airedale Terrier owned by Warren G. Harding.
- Liberty, President Gerald R. Ford's Golden Retriever, gave birth to eight puppies in the White House in 1975.
- Major, Franklin D. Roosevelt's dog which was moved from the White House back to Roosevelt's Hyde Park, New York, home in 1933 due to biting incidents.
- Manchu, Alice Roosevelt's small black Pekingese, was a gift from the last Empress of China.
- Millie, First Lady Barbara Bush's English Springer Spaniel, credited as author of the #1 New York Times non-fiction bestseller Millie's Book.
- Pete, President Theodore Roosevelt's Bull Terrier, bit so many people he was exiled from the White House.
- Pushinka, President John F. Kennedy's mix (Soviet space dog Strelka's puppy).
- Rex, Ronald Reagan's dog while in office.
- Rob Roy, President Calvin Coolidge and first lady Grace Coolidge's pet collie
- Spot "Spotty" Fetcher, President George W. Bush's English Springer Spaniel, was named after Scott Fletcher, a former Texas Rangers baseball player.

=== Dogs of writers and poets ===
- Boatswain, the favorite pet of Lord Byron, was the subject of the poet's Epitaph to a dog.
- Cabal, the white German Shepherd belonging to Neil Gaiman, who frequently features in his blog.
- Flush, Elizabeth Barrett Browning's Cocker Spaniel who was the subject of Virginia Woolf's Flush: A Biography, published in 1933.
- Jacksie, a small dog belonging to C. S. Lewis in his childhood, died in an accident when Lewis was four years old. Shortly thereafter, a young Lewis began calling himself Jacksie. Lewis was known to friends and family as Jack for the rest of his life.
- Josephine, a black miniature Poodle belonging to author Jacqueline Susann, and subject of her memoir Every Night, Josephine!.
- Marley, a yellow Labrador Retriever, was owned by journalist John Grogan. Marley was a neurotic dog, but proved himself to be a great and memorable pet, as stated in Grogan's 2005 book Marley & Me.
- Marlowe, Stephen King's Pembroke Welsh Corgi, inspired the character of Oy in King's fantasy series The Dark Tower.
- Nero, who belonged to Thomas and Jane Carlyle. He was small, 'part Maltese terrier, part mongrel', black and white, and described by Jane as having 'long white silky hair hanging all about him – and over his eyes which are very large and black'. Arriving in 1849, he stayed with them until his death in 1860.
- Norbert, a dog who appears in his own picture book series.
- Phiz, a Boston Terrier, was given to Helen Keller by some of her classmates from Radcliffe College.
- Pippin, whose carsickness inspired K. V. Johansen's series of picture books.
- Trixie Koontz, a retired service dog who died 30 June 2007, purported author of Life is Good: Lessons in Joyful Living and Christmas is Good, companion of Dean Koontz.

=== Others ===
- The 75 Dachshunds of William Randolph Hearst, who lived at his ranch, Hearst Castle.
- Bambi, a Chihuahua owned by prominent Northern Irish loyalist Sammy Duddy. Bambi received much media attention when he was shot dead in 2002 by rival loyalists during a gun attack on Duddy's home in Belfast.
- Ben, a Golden Retriever owned by Kirk Herbstreit who made several appearances on College GameDay and other various broadcasts.
- Blue, Don Cherry's dog.
- Buffy, a pomeranian owned by Telegram CEO, Pavel Durov.
- Chica, owned by YouTuber Markiplier.
- Daddy, owned by rapper Redman, who is famously part of Cesar Millan's pack when his master is travelling.
- Decoy Ohtani, the pet Kooikerhondje of Japanese baseball player Shohei Ohtani.
- Diamond, Sir Isaac Newton's favorite dog.
- Gizmo, a Yorkshire Terrier who accompanied storm chaser and entertainer Reed Timmer.
- Jofi, a Chow Chow belonging to Sigmund Freud. Jofi often sat in on therapy sessions and assisted in calming patients.
- Klondike, Sundae, and Chipwich, the three American Eskimo dogs owned by YouTube personality Jack Douglass (jacksfilms)
- Leo, a long-haired Dachshund owned by Charles Leclerc and his wife Alexandra, who frequently makes appearances at grands prix and featured in the couple's wedding photos.
- Marbles, Kermit, Peach, Bunny, Loni, and Maggie, the six dogs owned by internet personalities Jenna Marbles and Julien Solomita
- Nash, a three-year-old male Alaskan Husky, was part of Jeff King's Iditarod team, which also saw injuries to Crosby, a three-year-old male, and Banjo, a two-year-old male.
- Peritas, Alexander the Great's favourite dog.
- Roscoe, vegan bulldog (died 2025) adopted by Lewis Hamilton in 2013, who made frequent appearances at Formula One grand prix.
- Scipio, St. Bernard of Orville Wright.
- Tajniak, Father Jerzy Popiełuszko's black puppy.

== See also ==
- Dickin Medal
- Dogs in the American Revolutionary War (not war dogs)
- List of dog breeds
- List of dog types
- List of Labrador Retrievers
- List of oldest dogs
- List of fictional dogs
- List of wolves
- List of individual cats
- List of wealthiest animals
- Pets of Vladimir Putin
- PDSA Gold Medal, animal award for bravery and devotion to duty
