= ULK =

ULK may refer to:

- Kigali Independent University, a university in Rwanda
- Université Libre de Kinshasa, a private university in Kinshasa, Democratic Republic of the Congo
- Lensk Airport, IATA code
- Enzymes of the Unc-51-like kinase (ULK) family
  - ULK1
  - ULK2
  - ULK3
  - ULK4

ulk

- Meriam language, ISO 639-3 code

Ulk

- Ulk, a German satirical magazine
- Ulk (dog), of Chilean president Arturo Alessandri
