= Bunkō =

Japanese fire dog

Bunkō (ぶん公)
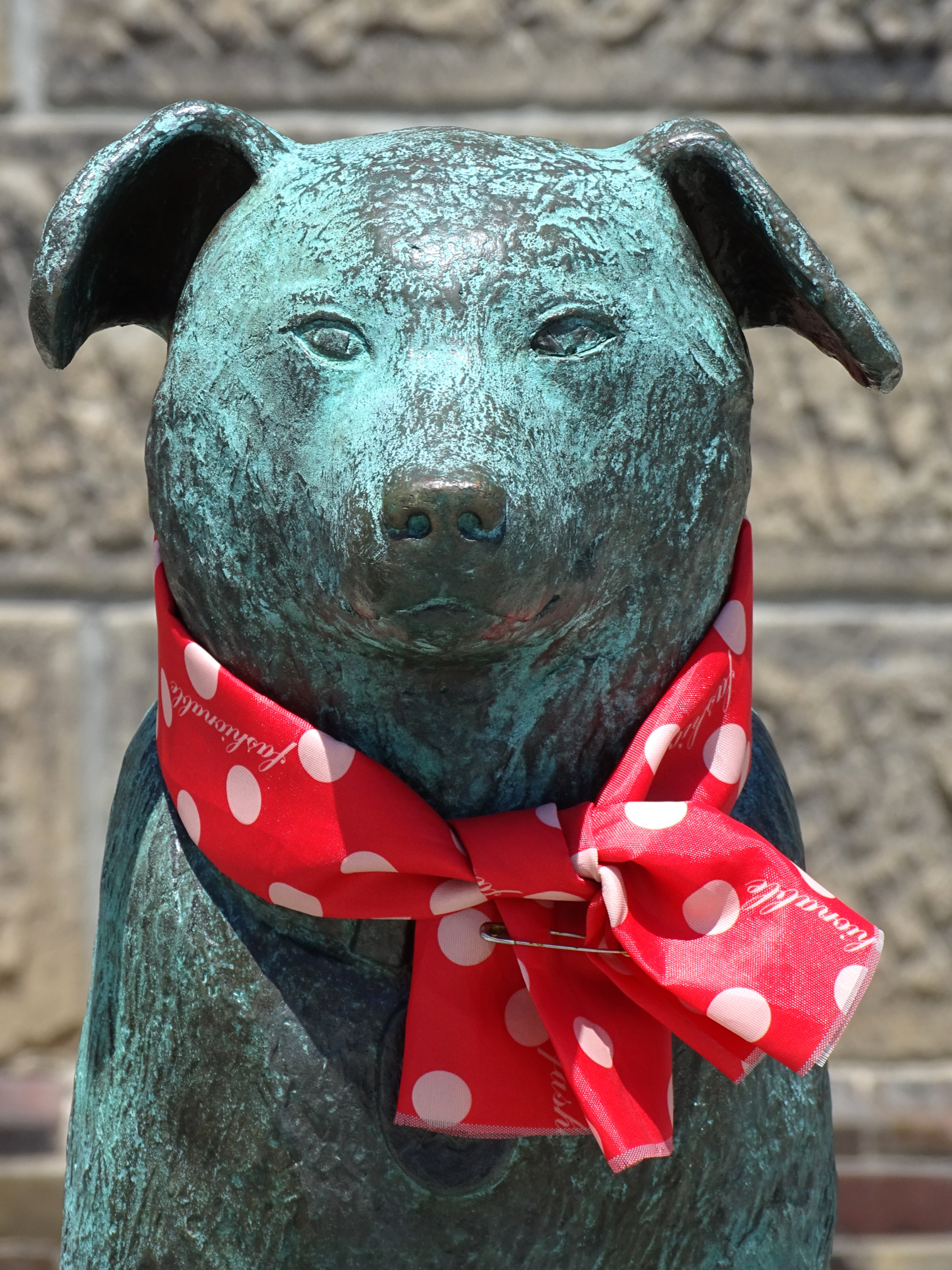
- Statue of Bunkō in Otaru
- Other name: Bun (文)
- Species: Dog (Canis lupus familiaris)
- Breed: Mongrel
- Sex: Male
- Born: Around 1914; Hokkaido, Japan
- Died: 3 February 1938 (aged 24); Otaru, Hokkaido, Japan
- Known for: Known as "the firefighting dog", and took part in over 1000 dispatches during his life.
- Owner: Otaru Fire Department

Bunkō (ぶん公; 1914 – February 3, 1938) was a Japanese mixed breed dog, famous for becoming the mascot of the Otaru city fire department. He was saved as a puppy after being found in burnt-down ruins after a fire and lived in the Otaru fire station for most of his life, being looked after by the firefighters.

Bunkō would ride along with the firefighters during their dispatches, finding his role in helping to control the onlookers and in disentangling hoses. It has been said that during his life Bunkō rode along on well over 1000 dispatches. His long life ended at the age of 24, and his remains were stuffed and preserved. To commemorate his achievements, a statue was unveiled in 2006, and picture books and other material for children have been written about his life and specific events within it. He is also known as simply Bun in Japanese.

== Life ==
Otaru has a long history as a port-town, and so during the Meiji period of the late 19th century it saw tremendous expansion as it became a focal point for the shipping of coal mined in Hokkaido to mainland Japan, and the unloading of supplies and personnel needed for the expansion into the interior of Hokkaido. As a result, the population boomed during the Meiji era. However, construction could not keep up with the demand for new houses, and there was an increase in wooden houses that could be built quickly. This resulted in Otaru being highly susceptible to fires, with large conflagrations that would result in the majority of the city being impacted occurring with a frequency of once every 2 to 3 years.

Bunkō's arrival as a public figure in Otaru came at a time when the city, having learned its lesson from the great fires, was in the process of trying to implement measures to safeguard the city, with stone houses being built and the establishment of a proper fire service.

In the spring of 1914, the fire service responded to a report of a fire and, after extinguishing the blaze, they found a crying puppy in the burnt-out ruins. With no one claiming the puppy as their own, the firefighters took him back to the station to raise him there.

The puppy was a mixed-breed male with white fur and brown spots, who came to be known as Bunkō among the firefighters. Bunkō was particularly attached to the head of the 5th fire division, a man called Kamiyama, who had been the one to save him originally. He was well loved by the other firefighters, who all shared bits of their lunch with him to keep him fed. Occasionally, they would round up some money to buy Bunkō his favourite treat of dried herring from the local market. Aside from dried herring, he was also known to love caramel sweets too.

Even after Kamiyama retired and left the fire service, Bunkō continued to live in the fire department, using a fire truck as his doghouse. Bunkō was an intelligent dog, and he was well liked by the people of Otaru. He loved most to have glasses and a firefighter's hat placed on him, and he was highly regarded by those who saw him walking proudly around the department building with his hat and glasses.

He was known to reply during the fire department's morning roll call, barking after all the other firefighters’ numbers had been called out. And, when he heard the command "Attention!", he would respond as the firefighters did by standing up straight with his forelegs in unison below him and his head high and not change his posture until he heard "At ease!". If he heard the command "Salute!" he would bring his paw up to his ear.

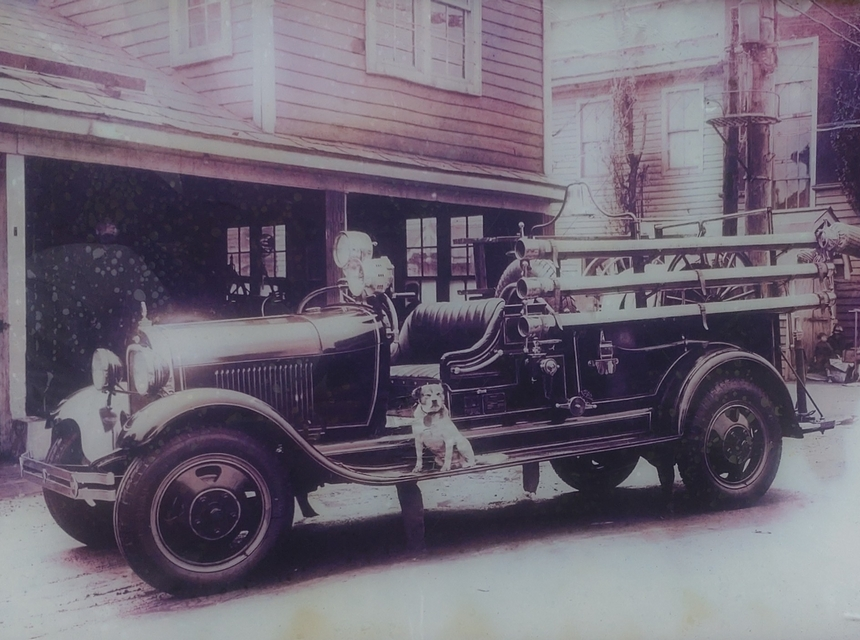
Bunkō on the side of a firetruck

He did this without ever being trained to do so, only copying what he saw the other firefighters do. He was also able to distinguish between the sound of the telephone bell and the fire-alert bell, and in the case of a fire he would howl to alert the others that it was time for dispatch. During the dispatch he would ride along on the side-step of the Chevrolet fire truck, never once falling off in all his dispatches.

At the scene of a fire, he would first grab the nozzle of the hose with his mouth and bring it to the person in charge of using it, and if the hose was to become tangled during the process of fighting the fire he would untangle that part so that the water could flow more easily. In addition, he was particularly adept at crowd-control, and would patrol the cordon during a fire to keep back on lookers, barking at them to stop them coming too close to the fire. It has also been said that Bunkō was able to take himself to the hospital to get treated if he was sick.

Bunkō's feats were heard beyond the local area in Otaru, with newspapers and magazines carrying his story across Hokkaido and the rest of Japan. As his dispatch count reached well over 1000 times, he became the pride of Otaru. During this same period the dog Hachikō had also become famous in Tokyo, and so he came to be called Otaru's Hachikō by some. Eventually, his age began to take its toll, and with his weakened legs and missing teeth making it impossible to grip a hose or move around to help out at the scene, he became more and more inactive. It has been said that even in his weakened state, when he heard the alarm to signal a fire, he would stagger over to try to board the fire truck, moving those around to tears.

Bunkō died at noon on 3 February 1938, while being looked after by the members of the fire department. He was 24 years old (over 100 in dog years). The Otaru Shimbun newspaper (now The Hokkaido Shimbun) ran the story announcing his death on the 5th of that month, with the headline “Firefighting Dog Bunkō’s Long & Heroic 24 Years Ends from Illness”.

Bunkō is known throughout Japan from radio and news articles as an outstandingly fine hound. On learning of his illness through our newspaper, there have been numerous dog loving well-wishers sending money and medicine to aid in his recovery from not only our own Hokkaido but as far away as the Sakhalin Islands. (Abbreviated) Remembering the many brilliant faces of Bunkō – gallantly riding towards the scene of a fire perched on the side of the fire truck; courageously gripping the firehose in his jaw; controlling onlookers with his bark – is enough to move even the firefighters to tears. — Tadashi Mizuguchi, Firefighting Dog Bunkō

== Legacy ==
A large-scale firefighter's funeral was held for Bunkō the day after his death. His casket was covered with a brocade cloth, in front of which was placed a wooden memorial tablet that read "Here lies the spirit of Otaru's firefighting dog, Bunkō". The Buddhist priest of the local Ryūtokuji Temple was invited to read from scripture, and many mourners came to hear the ceremony and pay their respects.

The news of Bunkō's death spread across all of Japan through newspaper and radio reports. The Otaru fire service received numerous commemoration wreaths and offerings. Two hundred of Bunkō's favourite caramel sweets were said to be amongst them.

To continue to spread the story of Bunkō's achievements he was stuffed and preserved, being displayed for a time in the fire service's main headquarters. Afterwards, he was kept by Otaru Museum being displayed at the Otaru Museum and Otaru Canal Museum, with many fans coming from across Japan to see Bunkō's taxidermy at the museum since the beginning of the 2010s. Bunkō's memory has been long lasting, and picture books and other children's literature has introduced his exploits.

On the 68th anniversary of Bunkō's death, 3 February 2006, a plan to publicly commemorate him began. Former members of Otaru's local fire department founded the “Committee for the Creation of a Commemoration Statue of Firefighting Dog Bunkō”. At the centre of this drive was a local businessman and former assistance-head of the fire department. He had thought of building a commemorative statue as he wanted to “give something back to Otaru”, and remembered Bunkō, deciding to build a bronze statue so that “more people will feel recognition towards the work of fighters and the fire service”.

The plan gained many supporters, and on the July 21st of the same year the statue was unveiled for the first time. The bronze statue, at the Otaru City Tourist Information Center (Canal Plaza), depicts Bunkō sitting on a pedestal as he looks towards the warehouses running all the canal. The pedestal's height was decided on the basis that it should be the right height for children to come and touch the statue and take commemorative pictures with Bunkō. On the plated photograph attached to the statue Bunkō is shown as he was at that time, riding on the sidestep of the Chevrolet fire truck. The statue has been well regarded, and occasionally hand-knitted hats and scarfs, or caramel sweets are left as offerings at the statue. And during the Christmas period the statue is dressed in a Santa Claus outfit, and many tourists come to take pictures with the statue.

In 2007, the Otaru company Ishii Printing unveiled four original characters under its in-house brand Otaru Shishōdō, one of which Otaru Un Gappa would go onto be the official mascot of the Otaru Tourism Board. One of these characters was a white puppy called Shachikurara, which was described as being the grandson of Bunkō. The next year, in 2008, the character gained popularity through merchandise like mobile phone charms and others.

In the same year, 2008, the non-profit organisation Kennel Club Japan awarded Bunkō with the first 'silver collar' prize, given to "dogs or humans who have contributed to the co-existence of pets and people within society". Along with the prize, the ceremony was held with a memorial concert on the 70th anniversary of Bunkō's death on 3 February 2008.

== See also ==
- List of individual dogs
