= Nemo (dog) =

Pet of Emmanuel Macron

- Breed: Labrador Retriever-Griffon
- Sex: Male
- Born: Marin; April 2016 (age 10); Tulle, Corrèze, France
- Residence: Élysée Palace, Paris

Nemo (born April 2016) is a black Labrador Retriever-Griffon dog owned by French President Emmanuel Macron and Brigitte Macron.

== Life ==
Nemo was born as Marin in 2016 in Tulle, former French President François Hollande's hometown. By August 2017, he was living in an animal shelter run by the Société protectrice des animaux (SPA; 'animal protection society'), an animal rights charity, in Hermeray, Yvelines near Paris. At the beginning of the same month, Brigitte Macron visited the centre and told staff that the presidential couple wanted to adopt a dog with a number of distinctive traits. They found a black Labrador Retriever-Griffon crossbreed named Marin.

On 27 August 2017, upon returning from their summer break, the Macrons went back to the SPA centre and officially adopted Marin. The president named him Nemo after Captain Nemo, a character in one of his favourite novels, Twenty Thousand Leagues Under the Seas by Jules Verne.

Nemo has lived in the Élysée Palace, the official residence of the French president, since 28 August 2017. On his first day, he welcomed Idriss Déby, the president of Chad, alongside President Macron.

In August 2020, a paper was published in the Asian Journal of Medicine and Health including Nemo among other fictitious authors. The paper aimed to demonstrate that this particular journal would publish anything as long as its article processing charges were paid.

== See also ==
- List of individual dogs
- List of Labrador Retrievers
