= Apollo (dog) =

Search and rescue dog in New York, US

- Species: Canis familiaris
- Breed: German Shepherd
- Sex: Male
- Born: 1992
- Died: November 2006 (aged 13–14)
- Occupation: Search and rescue dog
- Employer: New York Police Department
- Known for: Search and rescue operations at the World Trade Center site
- Owner: Peter Davis
- Awards: Dickin Medal; AKC Award for Canine Excellence

Apollo was a search and rescue dog who served with the K-9 unit of the New York Police Department. He was awarded the Dickin Medal, the animals' equivalent of the Victoria Cross, in recognition of the work done by all search and rescue dogs following the September 11 attacks. Apollo and his handler were working at the World Trade Center site soon after the attacks.

== Life and career ==
Apollo was a German Shepherd born around 1992, who was in service with the K-9 unit of the New York Police Department (NYPD). In 1994, he graduated from the NYPD Canine Special Operations Division, and was one of the first dogs to learn search and rescue. Apollo passed Type-II training in Florida in 1997, and Type-I in Indianapolis in 1999. He was also part of the first NYPD K-9 team to pass them for Urban Search and Rescue New York Task Force 1. Apollo and his handler Peter Davis also worked in the Dominican Republic after a hurricane. Apollo died in November 2006.

== September 11 attacks ==
Apollo and his handler, Peter Davis, were called in to assist with the rescue operations after the September 11 terror attacks. They arrived at the World Trade Center site fifteen minutes after the fall of the twin towers, making Apollo the first search and rescue dog to arrive at the site. At one point, Apollo was almost killed by flames and falling debris, however, he survived, having been drenched after falling into a pool of water just before this incident. Apollo started working again as soon as Davis had brushed the debris off him, saving eight lives in total.

== Recognition ==
Apollo received the Dickin Medal, the animal equivalent of the Victoria Cross, on behalf of all the search and rescue dogs who participated in the rescue operations at the World Trade Center site and the Pentagon. He received the award along with guide dogs Roselle and Salty, who rescued their owners from the World Trade Center. The citation for the award was as follows:

For tireless courage in the service of humanity during the search and rescue operations in New York and Washington on and after 11 September 2001. Faithful to words of command and undaunted by the task, the dogs' work and unstinting devotion to duty stand as a testament to those lost or injured.

Apollo received the American Kennel Club Ace award in 2001. He was also honoured for his work at the Westminster Kennel Club Dog Show of 2002, in which he and several other dogs from the New York Police Department's K-9 unit participated.

== See also ==
- List of individual dogs
