= Caesar (the Anzac Dog) =

War dog (1943–1957)

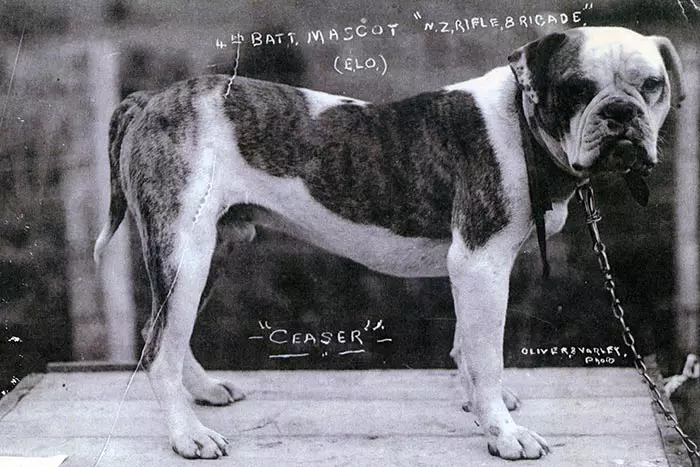
- Portrait of 'Caesar' (spelled incorrectly as Ceaser)
- Other names: Ceasar, Caesar the Anzac Dog
- Species: Canis familiaris
- Breed: Bulldog
- Sex: Male
- Employer: New Zealand Rifle Brigade, A Company, 4 Battalion,
- Known for: War dog
- Owner: Thomas Samuel Tooman
- Awards: Blue Cross Medal

Caesar (the Anzac Dog) was the mascot of the A Company, 4th Battalion, with the New Zealand Rifle Brigade. He was trained with the Red Cross and served in France during World War I.

== Biography ==
Caesar was a bulldog that worked in the A Company, 4th Battalion of the New Zealand Rifle Brigade. Throughout records his name was often misspelt "Ceaser" and is often referred to with both spellings.

Caesar led a parade down Auckland's Queen Street, toward the wharf with the Rifle Brigade before they left New Zealand for the Western Front. His name appears in The Mokoian Troopship Magazine alongside passengers in the A Company.

Caesar's arrival in France was reported:

Some of the units of the Expeditionary Force that have left New Zealand have taken dogs with them as mascots. Those that survived the trip on the transport were usually lost sight of in Egypt where the animals sometimes develop a profound dislike of the natives, with inevitable results. Word has been received in Auckland that the bulldog taken by the fourth battalion of Lord Liverpool's Own has actually reached the trenches in France, where the mascot was reported to be healthy and cheerful. The dog wears a collar presented by an Auckland resident.

— Auckland Star, Volume XLVII, Issue 165, 12 July 1916, Page 4.

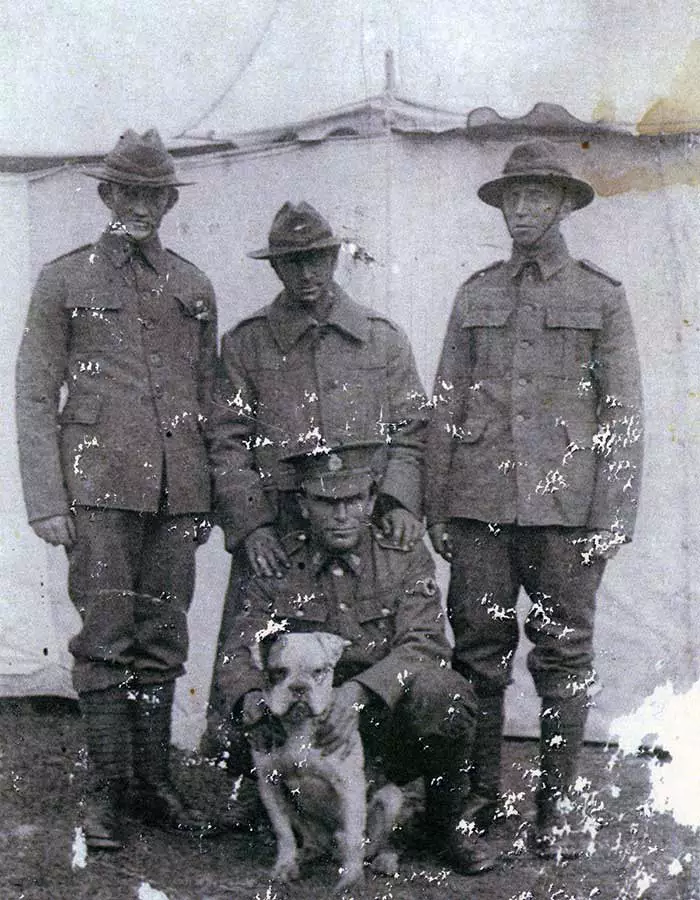
Photograph of Rifleman Thomas Samuel Tooman (s/n 26/918), Caesar's handler, standing on left and Caesar, being held by Private Albert Edward Griffin (s/n 3/1513).

Caesar was handled by Rifleman Thomas Samuel Tooman (15 June 1886 – 7 November 1956). While Tooman was sent to be an ambulance driver, Caesar was trained in Egypt in search and rescue with the Red Cross stretcher-bearers, before heading to France. He was taught to locate wounded soldiers on the battlefields of the Western Front and guide them back to safety. Caesar was equipped with a harness that held water, medical supplies and letter writing materials, which he took with him to retrieve soldiers. Caesar could deliver handwritten messages back to the trenches or, if the soldier was unconscious, would collect a piece of their equipment or clothing to help a rescue party evacuate them.

He was able to identify living soldiers, and left the dead. He was even trained to differentiate between allied and enemy uniforms and had a gas mask fitted to his face in case of a chemical attack.

During his service career, Caesar rescued around 16 people. This included one rifleman Henry George Johnson (13 April 1896 – 15 October 1917), buried alive in a trench until he was dug out by Caesar.

Caesar also boosted soldier morale, providing companionship and comfort during the war.

Caesar was killed in action close to the trenches in France during the Battle of the Somme, likely felled by a German sniper. His body was discovered in No Man's Land alongside a dead soldier, his hand resting on Caesar's head. They were buried together near a Casualty Clearing Station.

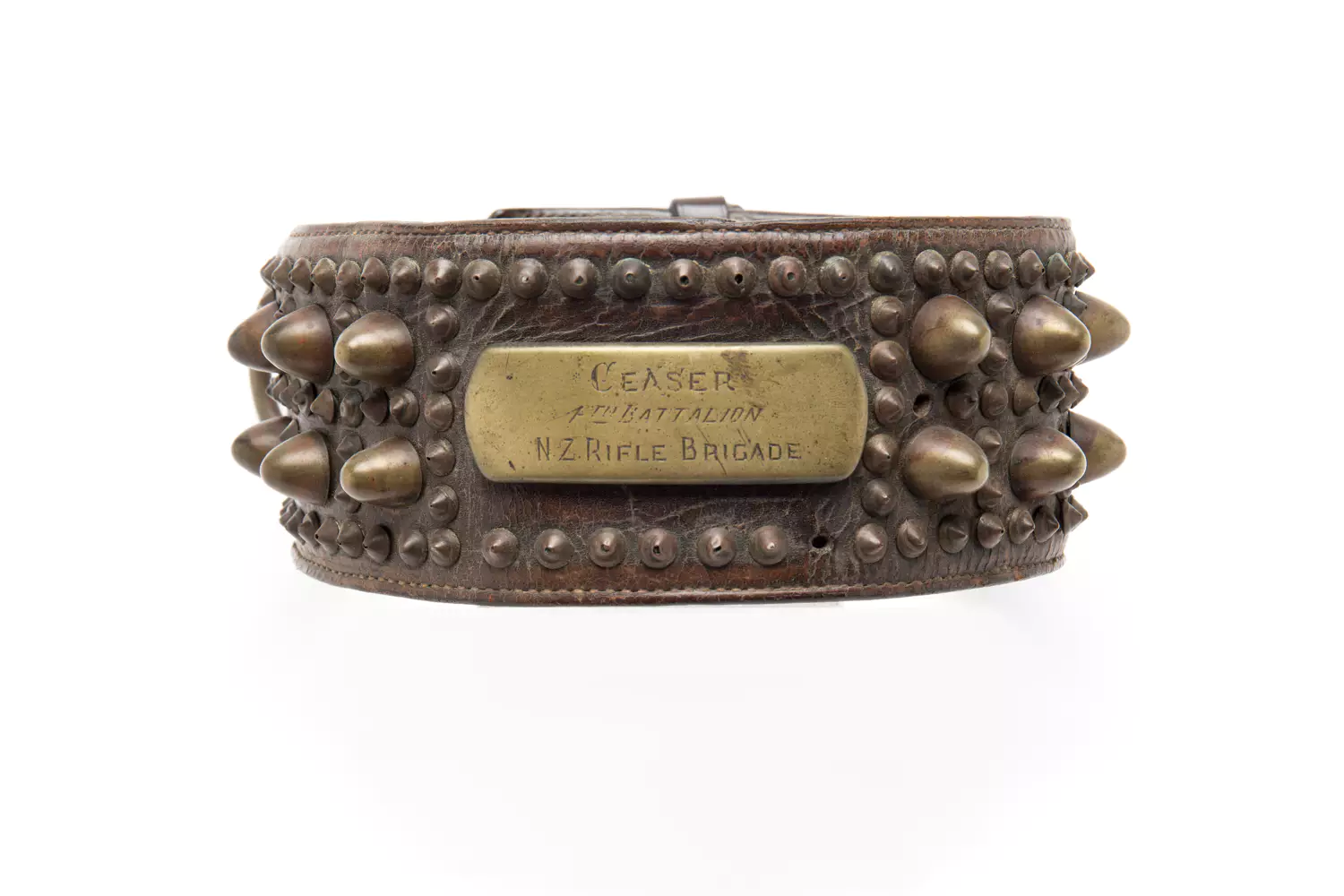
Leather dog collar belonging to Caesar, bulldog mascot of "A" Company 4th Battalion N.Z.R.B. Engraved as "Ceaser"

== Award and legacy ==
During World War I, Thomas Samuel Tooman wrote letters to his niece Ida, sharing stories of Caesar during the war. She later recalled these stories to her daughter, Patricia Stroud, who in 2003 wrote a children's book titled, Caesar the Anzac Dog, with illustrations by Bruce Potter.

In 2019, Caesar was awarded the Blue Cross medal for service and bravery at the National Army Museum in Wairouru. The medal is on permanent display at the National Army Museum. Caesar's collar is part of the Auckland War Memorial Museum collection.

== See also ==
- List of individual dogs
