= Canelo (dog) =

Individual Spanish dog

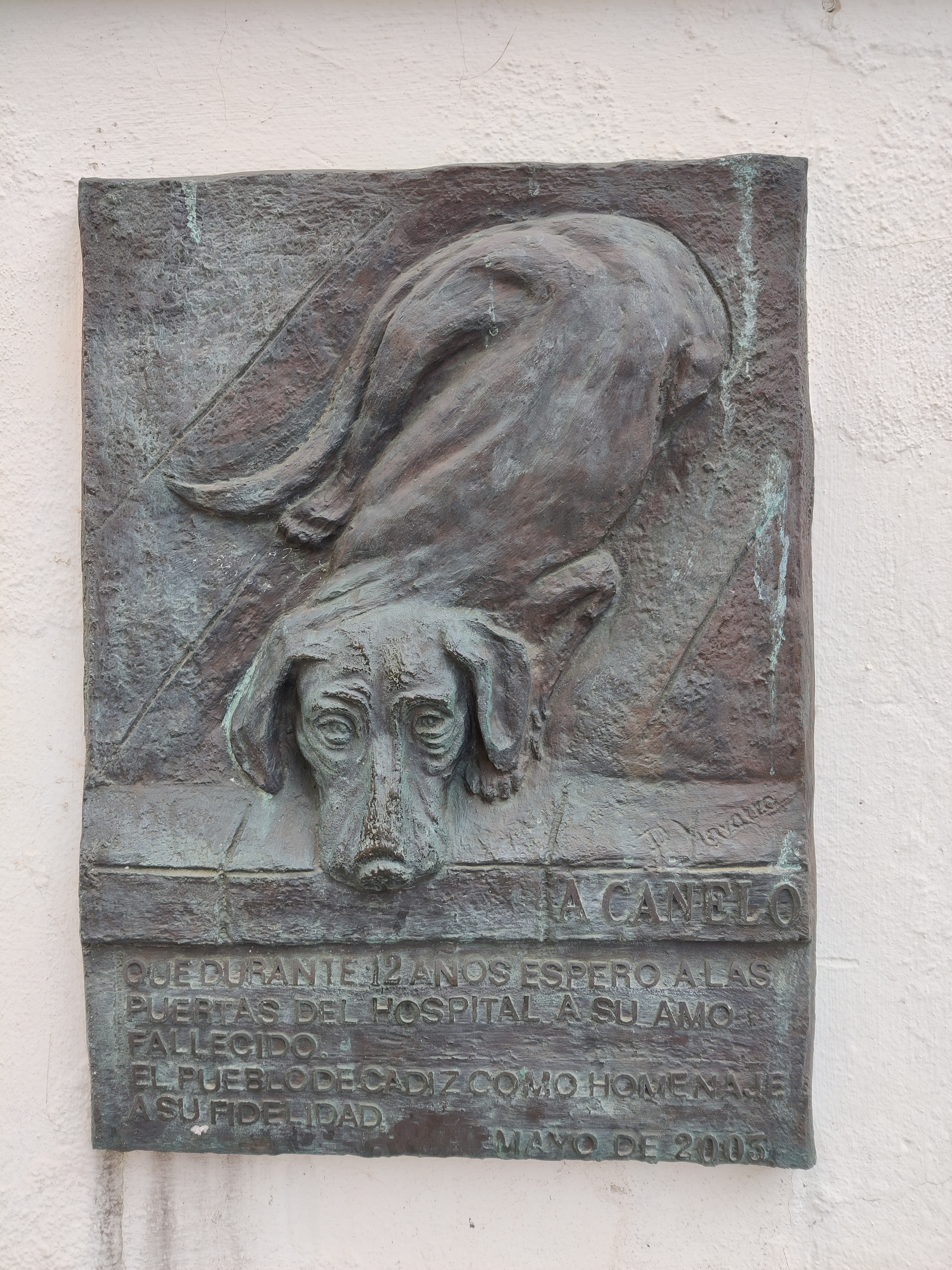
- Placa al perro Canelo (Cádiz, Spain)
- Species: Canis familiaris
- Breed: Terrier Mix
- Sex: Male
- Died: 2002; Cádiz
- Nationality: Spain

Canelo (1980s? (Note: Canelo's year of birth is unknown.) – December 9, 2002) was a mixed Terrier from Spain who came to public attention because of his demonstration of unwavering loyalty to his dead owner.

== Synopsis ==
Canelo lived with his anonymous owner in Cádiz, Spain in the late 80s, where they were regularly seen taking morning walks together. One of their weekly destinations was the Puerta Del Mar University Hospital where the owner was receiving kidney dialysis treatment. Because hospital's policies didn't allow animals inside, Canelo used to remain outside the door until the treatments are done, and the owner met him at the door on his way out, and together they would go home. This routine had been going on for a long time. On a day in 1990, the owner died at the hospital and Canelo, unknown of the demise of him, kept on waiting for him outside the hospital for the next 12 years until his death.

Canelo sat outside, day after day, waiting for his owner. Neither hunger, thirst nor harsh weather would persuade him to walk away from the door. As time passed by he was denounced and transferred to a kennel twice which he escaped, causing the animal welfare organization 'Asociación Agaden' and neighbours to obtain a special pardon for Canelo, to continue waiting for his owner outside the hospital without having any more legal problems. Hospital workers, neighbours and visitors who got to know about Canelo kept on feeding him and provided him with cardboard beds as he remained outside the hospital, refusing to be adopted by two separate families who volunteered to look after him. On 9 December 2002, after waiting for more than 12 years, Canelo who was now in his old age was killed when a motorist accidentally ran over him in the pedestrian crossing that he had crossed so many times.

Upon his death, the city council named the street he used to sleep next to the hospital after him. A bronze plaque with his sculpture which reads "To Canelo, who for 12 years waited at the hospital gates for his deceased master" was erected by the citizens of Cádiz, commemorating his unconditional love.

== See also ==
- List of individual dogs
