= Chopper (dog) =

U.S. military service dog (2005-18)

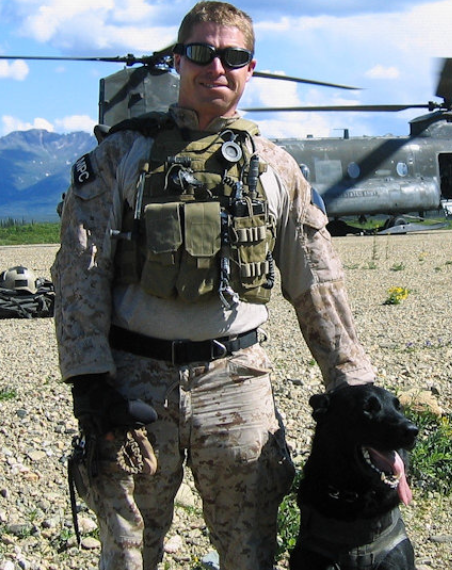
- Trevor Maroshek and Chopper
- Species: Canis familiaris
- Breed: German Shepherd
- Sex: Male
- Born: 2005; Czech Republic
- Died: 2018 (aged 12–13); Imperial Beach, California
- Notable role: Detection dog
- Years active: 2007–2011
- Owner: Trevor Maroshek
- Appearance: Black coat

Chopper (2005–2018) was a black German Shepherd military service dog who served with Navy SEAL Trevor Maroshek in Afghanistan and Iraq between 2007 and 2011. He was instrumental in detecting explosives and helped prevent attacks by the Taliban on U.S. forces. After he retired from military service, he became a therapy dog for Maroshek, helping him cope with PTSD and injuries. Chopper was honored at the White House, as well as being featured in the 2015 Smithsonian Channel documentary SEAL Dog.

== Early life ==
Chopper was born in the Czech Republic in July, 2005. Trained as a police dog, he was purchased by the U.S. Military and at 18 months became part of a new program initiated by the U.S. Navy SEALs to incorporate canine detection dogs into service. Navy SEAL Trevor Maroshek, who had already served overseas tours, one in Iraq, was given the opportunity to participate in the program. Maroshek chose Chopper out of three potential canine partners, in part because, with his jet-black appearance and demeanor, "he looked like a werewolf. I picked him because he was the scariest dog there." Chopper was one of the early dogs in the SEALS' Multi-Purpose Canine Program (MPCP), which Maroshek helped establish.

Chopper was a police dog who had won competitions for his speed in finding human targets on obstacle courses. He had also earned a reputation as being testy, having bitten three of his previous handlers. He initially trained with Maroshek for eight weeks in California, during which Maroshek adopted the use of German commands, used in dog training for their short, clear sounds, which Chopper already knew.

== Service in Iraq and Afghanistan ==
Chopper served two tours with Maroshek in Iraq and Afghanistan, from 2007 to 2011. His main role was to sniff out bombs, and he is credited with saving dozens of American lives. In one notable instance in Afghanistan in 2010, Chopper searched out two hidden Taliban fighters who had planted several hundred pounds of explosives underneath the Americans' compound, thus saving as many as 60 Navy SEALS.

The two were inseparable partners in many operations. "He saved my life numerous times", said Maroshek.

Chopper was Maroshek's only working dog, and Maroshek was Chopper's only handler with the U.S. military.

== Later life ==
Maroshek retired from active duty in 2012, after having served 10 years. Suffering from PTSD and physical issues himself, including head trauma from IED explosions, he requested that Chopper retire with him. He was told that there was no procedure for retiring a dog to an individual and the Navy didn't want a war dog released to civilian neighborhoods. Maroshek pursued the case for 18 months before the request was approved. This set a precedent for future veterans to potentially be re-united with their dogs after separation.

Maroshek credits Chopper for helping him meet his future wife, Ruj, when she asked him if she could pet his dog.

In April, 2014 Maroshek and Chopper met with Vice-president Joe Biden in the White House Executive Office Building, to honor military service dogs.

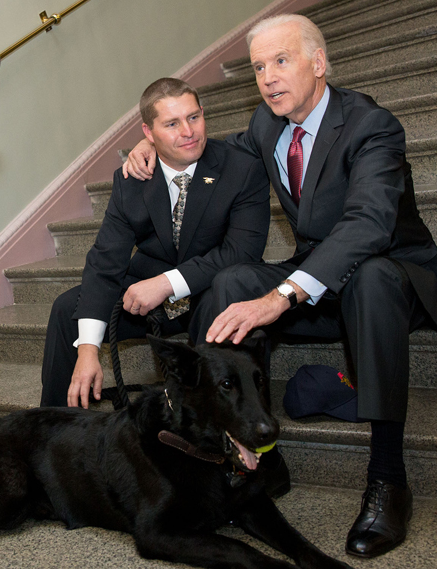
Maroshek and Chopper, with Vice President Joe Biden in 2014

In a 2015 interview on the Today Show, Maroshek described Chopper as a "true hero", who not only saved his life on the battlefield, but "continues to save my life off the battlefield", as a therapy dog. He stated that Chopper "showed me how to love again, and what true companionship was", after the difficult transition back to civilian life.

In 2015 the Smithsonian Channel released a one-hour documentary entitled SEAL Dog, featuring Maroshek and Chopper.

In 2017 Maroshek established the SEAL Dog Foundation as a section 501(c)(3) non-profit organization, which provides therapy dogs for veterans with combat-related injuries and PTSD.

Chopper died in the summer of 2018, at the age of 12. In November, 2019 Maroshek unveiled a bronze statue of Chopper in Imperial Beach, California, which recognizes the service of military dogs and their handlers. The statue is located in Veterans Park.

Chopper sired three pups, one of which, Thor, became Maroshek's dog after Chopper's death. The other two went to veterans as part of the SEAL Dog Foundation work.

== See also ==
- Dogs in warfare
- List of individual dogs § War dogs
- Bravehound
