= Heaven Sent Brandy =

One-time world's smallest dog

- Species: Canis lupus familiaris
- Breed: Long-haired Chihuahua
- Sex: Female
- Born: 31 December 2003
- Died: July 2014; Largo, Fl
- Known for: Smallest dog living (length)
- Title: Smallest dog living (length)
- Term: 31 January 2005 –
- Owner: Paulette Keller
- Residence: Hudson, Fl

Heaven Sent Brandy was the world's smallest dog by length, measuring 15.2 cm (6 in), according to the Guinness Book of World Records.

Brandy was bred by Marlene and Matthew Ritzenthaler. Her sire was an AKC registered Chihuahua, Sevenbark Devil's Gold, a UKC Best in Show winner and AKC Champion producer. Her dam is Creel's Carmelita, a pointed AKC Chihuahua and AKC Champion producer. Heaven Sent Brandy faced a challenge from Tom Thumb, a Jack Russell Terrier-Chihuahua mix puppy.

== See also ==
- List of individual dogs

Records
Preceded by	Smallest dog living (length); 31 January 2005 –	Succeeded by
