= Heart-kun =

Individual Chihuahua dog

Heart-kun (ハート君; born May 18, 2007) is a Chihuahua born with a heart-shaped patch of brown hair on its white coated body.

== History ==
Heart-kun was born in Ōdate, Akita, Japan on May 18, 2007, at the Pucchin Dog's shop. Born in a litter, Heart-kun was the only one of the group to have a heart-shaped patch. Shop owner Emiko Sakurada, who has bred more than 1,000 puppies over the course of several years, said that she had never seen such unique markings. "Kun" is an honorific that is appended most often to male names.

Heart-kun's owner, Sakurada, has received many requests from people who wish to buy him. Sukarada has rejected these requests, believing that the dog's special patch is giving her and her family luck. Two months after Heart-kun's birth, Sakurada's sister, Maki Matsuyama, won the lottery and a concert ticket. Matsuyama attributes this good fortune to Heart-kun.

The pattern of a dog's fur is determined by genes. Heart-kun likely had a heart-shaped design on his coat because he had a collection of genes that induced brown fur, as well as a second collection dictating that the brown fur would be amalgamated with white patterns.

Over 200,000 people watched videos of Heart-kun on YouTube. Heart-kun became well known in Japan after a Japanese TV station photographed him.

In August 2009, Heart-kun sired Kokoro-chan, who also possesses a heart-shaped design on its coat. In the same month, Heart-kun's mother, in a litter comprising four puppies, had a pup named Love-kun that possessed the distinct heart-shaped design on its coat. Sakurada reiterated that she would sell neither dog.

A horse with a white heart-shaped patch on its brown head has been given a similar name.

== See also ==
- List of individual dogs
