= Donnie (dog) =

Donnie is a Doberman Pinscher dog who came to the attention of scientists due to his penchant for arranging his plush toys in geometric forms. His owner rescued him from an animal shelter, and at first he was slow to learn, and very reluctant to interact socially with her.

== Behavior ==
He has appeared on the National Geographic Channel’s Dog Genius show. On the show, he is shown arranging some of his 80 plush toys into evenly spaced triangles and lines, and chooses to use, for example, only stuffed frogs or monkeys for a particular design. He is shown creating his arrangements in his large yard in Maryland on remote video cameras without humans being present.

He is even said to create social vignettes with the toys. For example, the day after he first allowed his owner to put her arm around him, he placed a large bear with its arm around a smaller frog. Dr. Barbara Smuts, a professor of psychology and specialist in animal behavior at the University of Michigan who studied Donnie and captured his activities on video, suggests that these behaviors may be linked to self-entertainment, or to past experiences such as his time spent in a shelter for a year with only a single toy. In her view, there have not been enough examples of behavior like Donnie's, to decide scientifically what they may mean.

== See also ==
- List of individual dogs
