= Zeltim Odie Peterson =

Dog

- Other name: Odie
- Species: Canis lupus familiaris
- Breed: Pug
- Sex: Male
- Born: July 9, 1997
- Died: January 31, 2008 (aged 10)
- Owner: Erica Volkman

Zeltim Odie Peterson (July 9, 1997 - January 31, 2008), better known just as Odie, was a purebred pedigreed pug, who received international media attention for his unusual talent. Odie, with the encouragement of his owner Erica Volkman, appeared to speak the words "I love you". AOL Television declared Odie's 2005 appearance on the Late Show with David Letterman as "the most memorable moment of the year".

Odie and his owner auditioned for the popular "Stupid Pet Tricks" segment of The Late Show with David Letterman on August 6, 2004. They appeared on the show in November 2004, and instantly garnered national media attention in the United States. In 2004, AOL Television proclaimed Odie's Late Show appearance as one of "TV's Top 5", and then ultimately awarded it the honor of "moment of the year".

Odie suffered from an enlarged heart. He died on January 31, 2008.

== Notable media appearances ==
Odie appeared on such television shows as The Late Show with David Letterman, The Oprah Winfrey Show, The Montel Williams Show, The CBS Early Show, and many others. Since Odie's talents were vocal, he was also a guest on radio shows. He appeared multiple times on Pittsburgh's KDKA Talk Radio. Odie was also a guest on the syndicated US radio program Animal Radio.

notable television appearances
| Date | Show |
|---|---|
| November 22, 2004 | The Late Show with David Letterman |
| December 2, 2004 | Pittsburgh Today Live |
| February 14, 2005 | Pittsburgh Today Live |
| February 23, 2005 | The Oprah Winfrey Show |
| October 20, 2005 | Pittsburgh Today Live |
| December 16, 2005 | The Montel Williams Show |
| September 25, 2006 | The CBS Early Show |

== See also ==
- List of individual dogs
