= Wheely Willy =

Chihuahua (1991–2009)

Willy
- Species: Dog
- Breed: Chihuahua
- Sex: male
- Born: c. 1991
- Died: December 22, 2009 (aged 17–18)
- Known for: raising awareness for disabilities
- Owner: Deborah Turner
- Weight: 4 lb (1.8 kg)

Willy (c. 1991–2009) was a paraplegic chihuahua from Long Beach, California who became a celebrity as the subject of two bestselling children's books. He made frequent public appearances promoting mutual understanding among those with and without physical disabilities. Following appearances on the television network Animal Planet, he was popularly dubbed Wheely Willy.

== Background ==
Willy was found abandoned in a cardboard box with spinal injuries and his vocal cords sliced. Taken in by a veterinary hospital and treated, Willy remained there for a year unadopted. Learning that the dog would be euthanised if not adopted, pet groomer Deborah Turner decided to bring him home.

Initially, the two pound (one kilogram) Willy needed to be carried everywhere, but Turner made several attempts to allow the dog to move autonomously. She tried attaching large helium-filled balloons to the dog's hindquarters and then placing him on a skateboard, with little success. Ultimately, an advertisement for K9 Carts, a type of wheelchair designed for canine applications, came to her attention. Willy adapted to this mode of transportation in short order; curiosity from Turner's customers and acquaintances led to local news coverage and steadily increased to international notability.

Willy made visits internationally, most often to hospitals, but he also participated in such events as the Cystic Fibrosis Fun Walk and the Los Angeles Marathon. He made several appearances on television talk shows and news programs. In 2004, following the Japanese translation of How Willy Got His Wheels, Willy flew to Japan and was given a pilot's cap by All Nippon Airways senior vice president Junko Yamauchi. He stayed for two weeks and met the royal prince and princess.

The dog's tenacity and good nature were frequently cited as an inspiration by people who encountered him.

Willy died on December 22, 2009. He and his owner both sustained injuries when the owner slipped on a porch made wet and slick from a rainstorm. Willy was unable to recover from his injuries.

== See also ==
- List of individual dogs
