= Manny the Frenchie =

American canine internet celebrity (2011–2023)

- Sex: Male
- Born: February 7, 2011
- Died: June 21, 2023 (aged 12)
- Years active: 2011–2023
- Known for: Internet Celebrity
- Owners: Amber Chavez and Jon Huang
- Residence: Chicago, Illinois
- www.mannythefrenchie.com

Manny the Frenchie (February 7, 2011 – June 21, 2023) was an American French Bulldog from Chicago, Illinois, that achieved Internet celebrity via the posting of his photographs on various social media websites. In 2013 he was the world's most followed and popular Bulldog on the Internet. Between his channels and the Manny and Friends channels, they reach over 4 million followers worldwide.

Manny was owned by Amber Chavez and Jon Huang and was named after the Filipino boxer Manny Pacquiao. His social media presence, as of December 2014, Manny has more than 20,000 followers on Twitter, more than 1.4 million "likes" on Facebook and more than 900,000 followers on Instagram. He has been used as a canine model for consumer Martha Stewart's PetSmart line and has been featured on Steve Harvey's television talk show. In 2016 Manny was awarded The CW's World Dog Award for Most Pawpular and Influential dog. He also appeared in an book called Manny The Frenchie: Art of Happiness

On July 10, 2023, it was announced that Manny had died, at the age of 12. Chavez would later state Manny had died on June 21.

== See also ==
- List of individual dogs
