= Argo (dog) =

Stray dog from Pompeii (c. 2009–2024)

- Other name: Barone
- Species: Canis familiaris
- Breed: Mongrel
- Sex: Male
- Born: Pompeii
- Died: January 23, 2024 (aged 14–15); Pompeii

Argo (c. 2009 (Note: Argo was approximately 15 years old in 2024, placing his birth in 2009.) – January 23, 2024), also called Barone, was a free-ranging dog who lived in the ruins of Pompeii. He became a mascot and guardian of the cultural site.

== Background ==
Stray dogs have historically roamed the streets and domus of Pompeii, an archaeological site on the ruins of an ancient Roman city. The superintendents and directors of the site have sought to reduce the number of stray dogs to prevent dog bites and disease, although the dogs were popular with visitors. Since the 1990s, there were attempts to reduce the number of stray dogs in Pompeii.

In 2009, authorities in Pompeii began to register, sterilize, and microchip the dogs, then put them up for adoption. However, the program was beset by corruption and inefficiency, and only 26 dogs were adopted. A more effective adoption program began in 2014, during the Great Pompeii Project. A small number of dogs who were disease-free and not considered dangerous to tourists were recognized as "neighborhood dogs" of Pompeii. All of these dogs were eventually adopted except Argo, the last of the stray dogs in Pompeii's ruins.

The park's current regulations prohibit the abandonment of animals at the site, and prevents visitors from bringing pet dogs that weigh over 10 kilograms (22 lb).

== Life ==
Argo was also sometimes called "Barone" ('rascal') by locals. He began visiting Pompeii as a puppy, and learned the opening hours for the site during summer and winter. He was the first to enter the site each day, and the last to leave. He joined school and tourist groups visiting Pompeii, and often accompanied archaeologists working on the site. He also attended theatrical performances held in Pompeii. Argo became known for his kind and gentle personality. People typically pet him and gave him food when they encountered him. He was considered the guardian and "landlord" of the ruins.

== Death and legacy ==
Argo died at about 15 years old, on January 23, 2024. His body was cremated. Many people expressed condolences on social media, and a volunteer named Glauco Messina asked people who had visited Pompeii in previous years to share their photos of Argo. Argo was considered to be a part of the archaeological excavations, and was tolerated as "the last dog of Pompeii".

The archaeological park of Pompeii paid tribute to him for his honorable service as custodian and anfitrione ('landlord') of the ancient city. Silvia Vacca, a park official, made a memorial post on Facebook, writing that "With [Argo], the last bastion of the Pompeian dogs, the guardians of the souls of the ancient inhabitants, dies." In January 2024, there was a proposal to erect a statue in his honor inside the Pompeii ruins.

== See also ==
- Argos (dog), the pet dog of Odysseus in Greek mythology
- List of individual dogs
