= Isabel Klee =

American writer and animal welfare advocate

- Born: Isabel Dixon Klee; 1993 or 1994; South Orange, New Jersey
- Education: Marymount Manhattan, BA, English literature
- Occupations: Writer; animal welfare advocate; content creator
- Known for: Fostering and rehabilitating medically and behaviorally complex rescue dogs
- Notable work: Dogs, Boys, and Other Things I've Cried About (2026)
- Spouse: Jacob Zerhusen (m. 2026)

Isabel Klee is an American writer, animal welfare advocate and content creator who documents her experience as a foster for medically and behaviorally complex dogs on social media platforms including TikTok and Instagram. She works in partnership with Muddy Paws Rescue, a New York City-based non-profit.

Klee's social media accounts, SimonSits, were named for Simon, a Jindo mix with idiopathic epilepsy rescued from the South Korean dog meat trade. Klee fostered five dogs before fostering Simon, who she adopted in 2019. In October 2026, @SimonSits had more than 2.3 million followers.

Klee's book, Dogs, Boys, and Other Things I've Cried About: A Memoir, was published by HarperCollins in April 2026. It debuted at #1 on the New York Times Nonfiction Best Seller list. The book was dedicated to Simon, who helped to rehabilitate 37 fosters alongside Klee, her then-fiance Jacob Zerhusen, and Muddy Paws. Simon died three months after the book's publication.
