= Animal Aid Unlimited =

Animal rescue organization in Rajasthan, India

- Abbreviation: AAU
- Formation: 2002; 24 years ago
- Founder: Erika, Jim, Claire Abrams Myers
- Founded at: Udaipur, Rajasthan, India
- Type: Animal Welfare NGO
- Region served: Rajasthan
- Staff: +150
- Website: https://animalaidunlimited.org

Animal Aid Unlimited or AAU, founded in 2002, is an Indian animal rescue organization, based in Udaipur city of Rajasthan which rescues and treats animals that are sick, injured, stuck or in need of urgent medical aid and attention. They gained more popularity worldwide after they started posting videos of their rescue on their YouTube channel, Animal Aid Unlimited, India.

== History ==
Animal Aid Unlimited opened the Animal Aid Hospital in 2002. As of 2017, the organization claims to have saved more than 45,000 injured or ill dogs, cows, donkeys, birds and cats.

In 2021, Gary Notely, a dog training instructor, hosted a charity event at Zara Indian Restaurant in Woodham Mortimer.

On 26 April 2017, Bollywood actress Anushka Sharma, who is also an animal welfare activist and an avid animal lover, made a surprise visit to the shelter.

Its rescue videos are also frequently featured in the social media platforms of The Dodo.

As of January 2025, their YouTube channel has over 7.34 million subscribers. Some of the most viral videos of the channel are "Wounded and bleeding donkey stranded on highway rescued", " Anguished mother dog wails for wounded baby. Sweetest reunion!" & "A drowning dog's desperate wish comes true" all of which have 173; 145 and 121 million views respectively.

== See also ==
- Humane Society International
- Blue Cross of India
