= Ulk (dog) =

Great Dane owned by Chilean President Arturo Alessandri

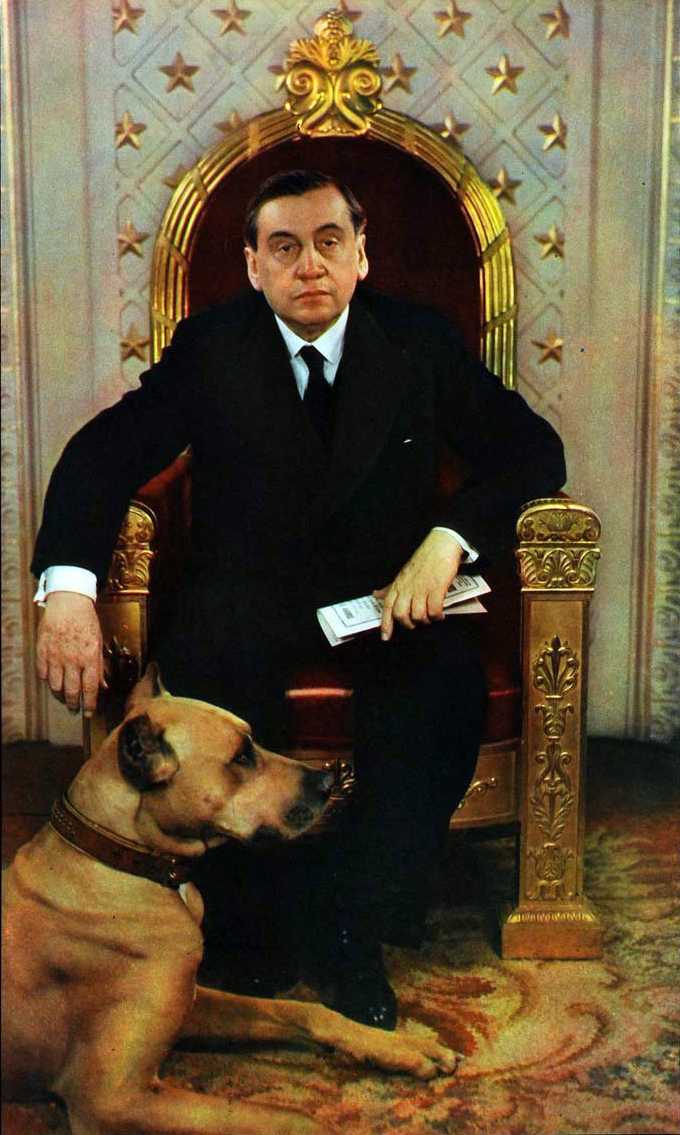
- Ulk in Arturo Alessandri's official photograph
- Species: Canis familiaris
- Breed: Great Dane
- Sex: Male
- Born: September 16, 1932
- Died: September 6, 1942
- Owner: Arturo Alessandri

Ulk (1932–1942) was a Great Dane owned by Chilean President Arturo Alessandri during his second presidency. Eventually Ulk became the symbol of his government, appearing in numerous photographs of the time. Ulk is remembered in various anecdotes about the government of Alessandri. Allegedly, Ulk once stepped in while a diplomat was offering his credentials to the president and rose on two legs and licked the diplomat's face.

== See also ==
- List of individual dogs
- Reichshund, the Great Dane of Otto von Bismarck
