= Working rat =

Trained animal

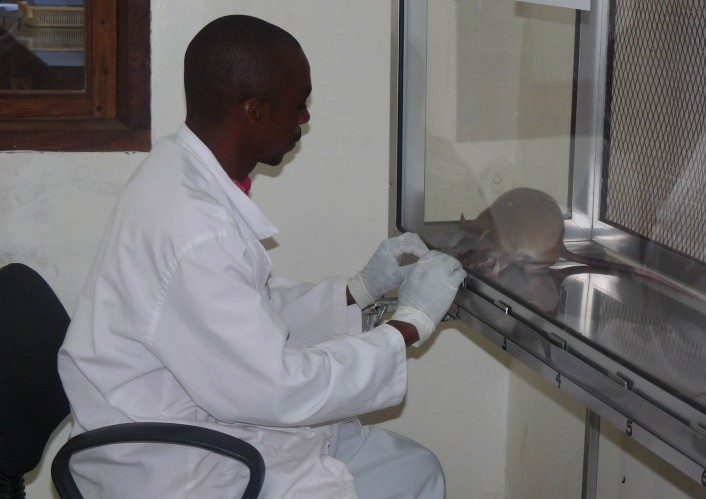
A HeroRAT can sniff sputum samples to detect tuberculosis.

A working rat is any rat which is trained for specific tasks as a working animal. In many cases, working rats are domesticated brown rats. However, other species, notably the Gambian pouched rat, have also been trained to assist humans.

== Domesticated brown rats ==
Pet rats derived from Rattus norvegicus, such as fancy rats and laboratory rats, have been trained for various jobs.

=== Forensics ===
In the Netherlands, police have begun using brown rats to sniff out gunshot residue and blood at crime scenes. Ed Kraszewski, spokesman for the task force, has said that the rats are easier and cheaper to train than dogs.

=== Entertainment ===
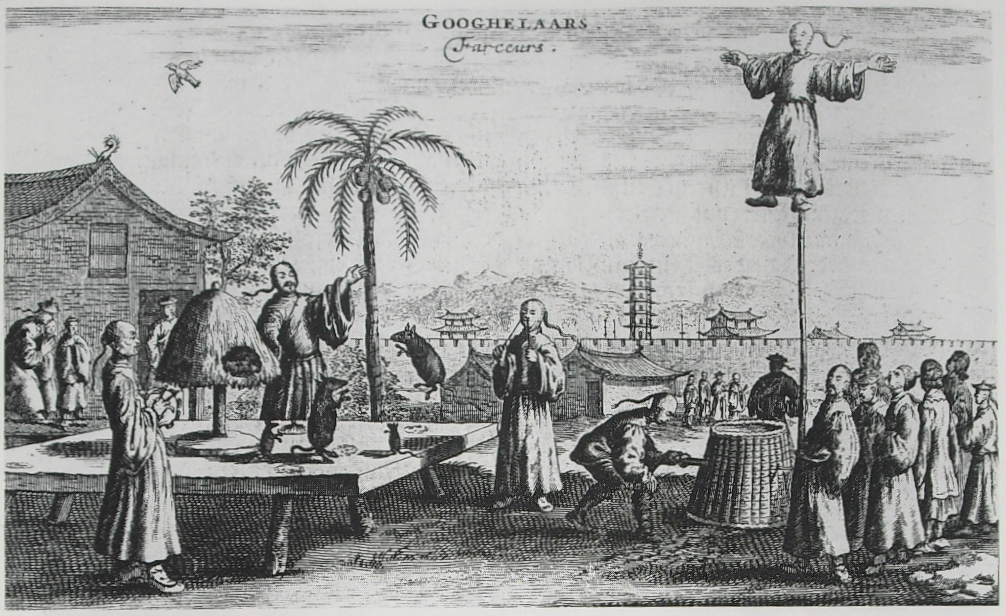
Rather large mice and rats performing in a Chinese street circus troupe, as seen by Johan Nieuhof in 1655-57

Rats have been trained to appear in magic acts, music videos, movies, and television shows. Samantha Martin, a professional animal trainer, has claimed that rats are one of the easiest animals to train due to their adaptability, intelligence, and focus.

=== Laying computer link cable ===
By being trained to carry a string through holes in walls, a rat can help economically wire a building for the Internet; afterwards, people use the string to pull the computer link cable through.

=== Therapy and assistance animals ===
Domestic rats are used as therapy animals for children with developmental disabilities. Their small size may be less threatening to some children, and therapy centers with limited space can easily house a few rats.

Domestic rats have been trained as service animals, such as to identify damaging muscle spasms for people whose ability to sense this has been compromised by their disability; domesticated rats can be more useful than service dogs for purposes such as these due to their small size and lack of aggression.

== Gambian pouched rats ==
A Belgian non-government organization, APOPO, trains Gambian pouched rats (Cricetomys gambianus) to sniff out land mines and tuberculosis. The trained pouched rats are called HeroRATS. Hundreds of thousands of people worldwide commit to "adopt" rats and pay to support them.
