= Ajax (dog) =

Dog in Spanish law enforcement

- Other name: Ajax D-38
- Species: Canis familiaris
- Breed: German Shepherd
- Sex: Male
- Born: 2001
- Died: 5 August 2013 (aged 12); Málaga, Spain
- Resting place: Civil Guard Museum, Madrid, Spain
- Employer: Civil Guard
- Notable role: Detection dog
- Years active: 2004–2012
- Known for: Foiling ETA bombing in 2009
- Owner: Civil Guard
- Residence: Lobo Park (2012–2013)
- Awards: PDSA Gold Medal

Ajax D-38 (2001 – 5 August 2013) was a German Shepherd who worked as a detection dog for the Civil Guard of Spain from 2004 to 2012. In 2009, he detected a bomb that ETA had attached to a car in Mallorca. He was awarded the PDSA Gold Medal in 2013, and was the third dog from outside the United Kingdom to receive the award. He was received by Juan Carlos I, becoming the first non-human animal to have an audience with the king of Spain.

== Biography ==
Ajax D-38 was born in 2001. In 2004, he began working for the Civil Guard as a detection dog, with sergeant Juan Carlos Alabarces Muñoz. He had an eight-year career, with the first six defending the Spanish royal family and the last two defending the prime minister of Spain.

On 30 July 2009, after the assassination by ETA of two Civil Guards in Palma Nova, Mallorca, Ajax discovered a bomb attached under a car. It was able to be detonated safely. He retired in 2012, and moved to Lobo Park, a wolf enclosure in Antequera. He died in Málaga on 5 August 2013, aged 12; he had been ill with anaemia and a liver infection.

== Recognition ==
In June 2013, Ajax was awarded the PDSA Gold Medal by the United Kingdom's People's Dispensary for Sick Animals. He was the 22nd recipient of the award, and the third from outside the United Kingdom, after Bamse of Norway and George of New Zealand. On 18 June, he was received at the Palace of Zarzuela by Juan Carlos I, becoming the first non-human animal to have an audience with the king of Spain.

Days after Ajax's death, it was reported that Alabarces Muñoz was considering taxidermy of the body, and its display at the Civil Guard museum or an external science museum. In April 2016, the preserved body was put on display at the Civil Guard museum.

A bust of Ajax was commissioned in 2016 and unveiled in December 2020 at a park in Antequera. The dedication was attended by Alabarces Muñoz and political and police leaders. The park was dedicated to nine notable dogs, including Ajax.
