= Manaia, Taranaki =

Settlement in Taranaki Region, New Zealand

Manaia
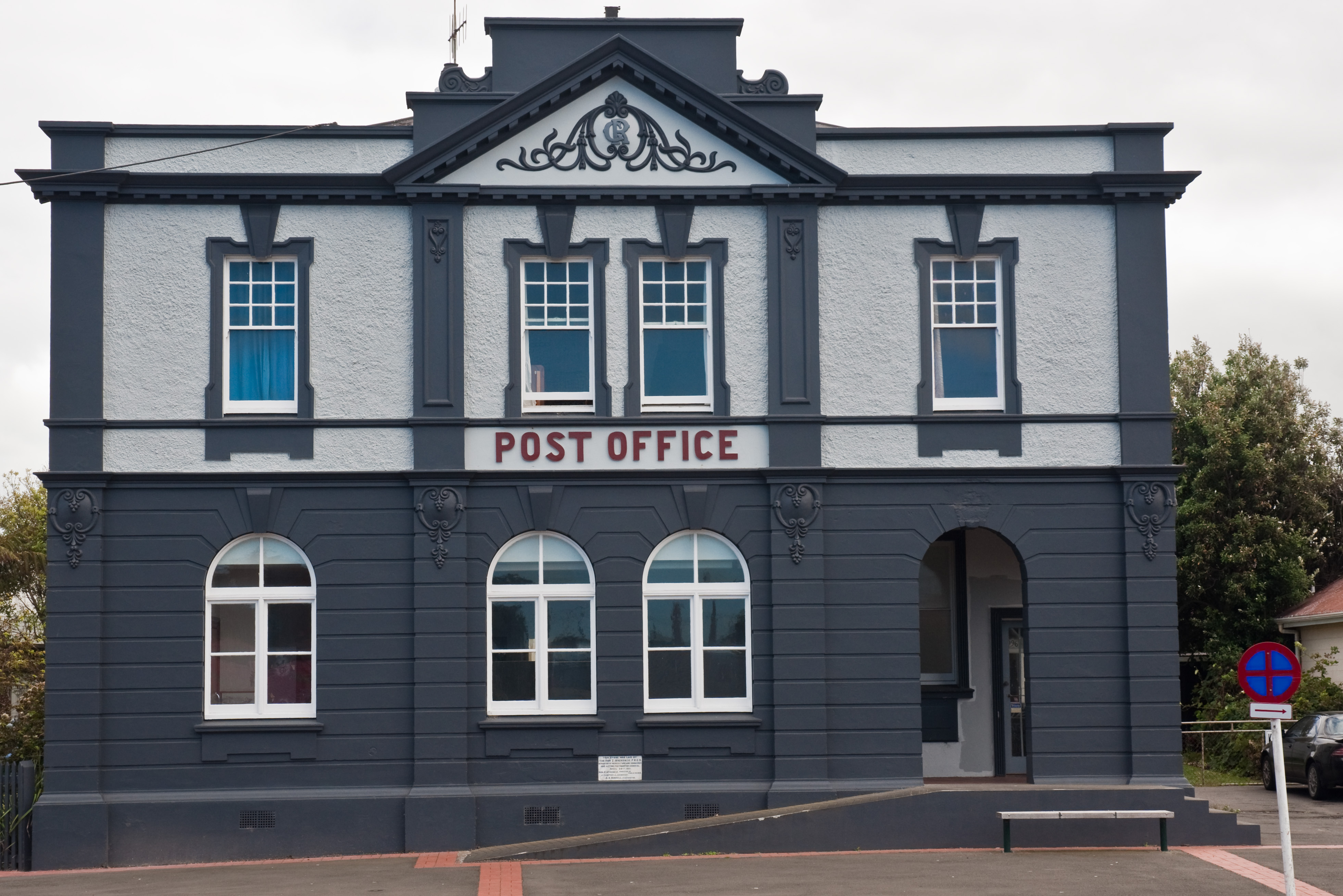
- Manaia post office, 2010
- Interactive map of Manaia
- Coordinates: 39°33′S 174°08′E
- Country: New Zealand
- Region: Taranaki Region
- Territorial authority: South Taranaki District
- Ward: Taranaki Coastal General Ward; Te Kūrae Māori Ward
- Community: Taranaki Coastal Community
- Electorates: Whanganui; Te Tai Hauāuru (Māori)

Government
  - Territorial Authority: South Taranaki District Council
  - Regional council: Taranaki Regional Council
  - Mayor of South Taranaki: Phil Nixon
  - Whanganui MP: Carl Bates
  - Te Tai Hauāuru MP: Debbie Ngarewa-Packer

Area
  - Total: 2.55 km^{2} (0.98 sq mi)

Population (June 2025)
  - Total: 1,120
  - Density: 439/km^{2} (1,140/sq mi)

Manaia is a rural town in South Taranaki District, New Zealand. Ōpunake is 29 km to the northwest, and Hāwera is 13 km to the southeast. Kaponga is 15 km north. State Highway 45 passes through the town. Manaia is named after the former Māori chief of the district, Hukunui Manaia.

== History and culture ==
=== Māori history ===
The mouth of the Kapuni River was the site of two pā settled by Ngāti Ruanui in the 1800s: Orangi-tuapeka Pā on the western banks and Waimate Pā on the east. Orangi-tuapeka Pā was occupied by Wiremu Kīngi Moki Te Matakātea in 1833 and 1834, where he defeated Waikato Tainui forces led by Pōtatau Te Wherowhero, ending Waikato raids into Taranaki. In October 1834, the area was bombarded by British troops aboard HMS Alligator, in an attempt to rescue Betty Guard, a whaler's wife. After the hostages were released, the British troops attacked and burnt the settlements.

After the ceasefire at the end of the First Taranaki War, a hui of over 1,000 Māori was held on 3 July 1861 at a meeting house called Aotearoa, close to Waimate Pā. There, over a thousand members of Taranaki, Ngāti Ruanui, Ngā Rauru and Whanganui iwi discussed the war, with most members pledging support for the Kīngitanga Movement.

=== European settlement ===
Manaia's history is still visible in the Manaia Redoubt. Built around 1880 on the site of a former pā (Te Takahe) during peacetime, this redoubt and wooden watchtower was created for the passive resistance of the Parihaka chief, Te Whiti o Rongomai, and his followers.

The wooden watchtower (35 feet high) was blown down in a storm and replaced in 1912 by a concrete one still standing today amidst the 18-hole golf course surrounded by two original blockhouses. Trenches surround the tower and blockhouses. The complex could house 160 men and all the timber used for the construction was pit sawn locally by the constables. The golf course is one of the oldest in Taranaki, established around 1905.

When driving into Manaia from Hāwera the remains of the old flour mill can be seen on the left hand side. These concrete remains of the mill were built in 1900 to replace the original wooden mill built in 1882 by Mr D. F. McVicar of the Sentry Hill flour mill, New Plymouth. The local Waiokura River powered the mill by a 15-foot (4.6 m) water wheel which developed 15 horsepower (11 kW). The mill had 4 stories, and a 23-foot (7.0 m) stud. It was 35 feet (11 m) long and 20 feet (6.1 m) wide. About 40,000 feet (12,000 m) of timber was used and the building provided storage for about 15,000 sacks of flour. Yarrows Bakers employed around 250 people, and has been the main business in Manaia since 1923. The company manufactures fresh and frozen breads and bakery products. Its clients include Foodstuffs, Subway, and Pams. The company went into receivership in 2011 but was bought out by a member of the Yarrow family and continued operation.

=== Modern history ===
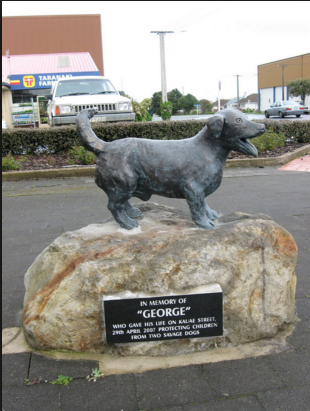
The statue of George in Manaia

In 2007, a 9-year-old Jack Russell Terrier called George (dog) died protecting 5 local children from an attack by two pit bulls . He was given a posthumous PDSA Gold Medal, the animal equivalent of the George Cross, at a special ceremony in Manaia in February 2009. The town has also erected a statue in his honour.

=== Marae ===
Manaia has three marae affiliated with the local Ngāruahine iwi (tribe): Tawhitinui Marae and Okare Tuatoru meeting house, Waiokura Marae and Paraukau Tukau meeting house, and Okare ki Uta|Okare ki Uta Marae.

=== Historic place ===
The memorial band rotunda in the Town Square dates from World War I and is a Heritage New Zealand category 2 historic place.

== Demographics ==
Manaia is described by Statistics New Zealand as a rural settlement. It covers 2.55 km^{2} (0.98 sq mi) and had an estimated population of 1,120 as of June 2025, with a population density of 439 people per km^{2}.

Historical population for Manaia
Year	Pop.	±% p.a.
2006	930	—
2013	966	+0.54%
2018	984	+0.37%
2023	1,083	+1.94%

Manaia had a population of 1,083 in the 2023 New Zealand census, an increase of 99 people (10.1%) since the 2018 census, and an increase of 117 people (12.1%) since the 2013 census. There were 552 males, 522 females, and 12 people of other genders in 426 dwellings. 3.9% of people identified as LGBTIQ+. The median age was 43.1 years (compared with 38.1 years nationally). There were 216 people (19.9%) aged under 15 years, 183 (16.9%) aged 15 to 29, 489 (45.2%) aged 30 to 64, and 198 (18.3%) aged 65 or older.

People could identify as more than one ethnicity. The results were 73.7% European (Pākehā), 47.1% Māori, 2.2% Pasifika, 1.9% Asian, and 3.0% other, which includes people giving their ethnicity as "New Zealander". English was spoken by 98.1%, Māori by 10.5%, and other languages by 3.0%. No language could be spoken by 1.1% (e.g. too young to talk). New Zealand Sign Language was known by 0.3%. The percentage of people born overseas was 7.8, compared with 28.8% nationally.

Religious affiliations were 27.1% Christian, 0.3% Islam, 2.2% Māori religious beliefs, 0.3% New Age, 0.3% Jewish, and 0.8% other religions. People who answered that they had no religion were 57.1%, and 11.9% of people did not answer the census question.

Of those at least 15 years old, 69 (8.0%) people had a bachelor's or higher degree, 480 (55.4%) had a post-high school certificate or diploma, and 321 (37.0%) people exclusively held high school qualifications. The median income was $28,500, compared with $41,500 nationally. 27 people (3.1%) earned over $100,000 compared to 12.1% nationally. The employment status of those at least 15 was 375 (43.3%) full-time, 90 (10.4%) part-time, and 36 (4.2%) unemployed.

=== Kapuni statistical area ===
Kapuni statistical area surrounds but does not include Manaia. It covers 106.82 km^{2} (41.24 sq mi) and had an estimated population of 560 as of June 2025, with a population density of 5.2 people per km^{2}.

Historical population for Kapuni
Year	Pop.	±% p.a.
2006	1,620	—
2013	681	−11.64%
2018	570	−3.50%
2023	558	−0.42%
The 2006 population is for the statistical area of Manaia-Kapuni, which did include Manaia, and covered a larger area of 109.38 km^{2}. Source:

Kapuni had a population of 558 in the 2023 New Zealand census, a decrease of 12 people (−2.1%) since the 2018 census, and a decrease of 123 people (−18.1%) since the 2013 census. There were 285 males and 273 females in 222 dwellings. 2.2% of people identified as LGBTIQ+. The median age was 35.0 years (compared with 38.1 years nationally). There were 132 people (23.7%) aged under 15 years, 102 (18.3%) aged 15 to 29, 270 (48.4%) aged 30 to 64, and 57 (10.2%) aged 65 or older.

People could identify as more than one ethnicity. The results were 88.2% European (Pākehā), 23.7% Māori, 2.2% Pasifika, 3.2% Asian, and 2.2% other, which includes people giving their ethnicity as "New Zealander". English was spoken by 96.8%, Māori by 5.4%, and other languages by 2.7%. No language could be spoken by 3.2% (e.g. too young to talk). New Zealand Sign Language was known by 0.5%. The percentage of people born overseas was 7.5, compared with 28.8% nationally.

Religious affiliations were 28.5% Christian, 1.1% Māori religious beliefs, 1.1% New Age, and 0.5% other religions. People who answered that they had no religion were 61.3%, and 9.1% of people did not answer the census question.

Of those at least 15 years old, 51 (12.0%) people had a bachelor's or higher degree, 243 (57.0%) had a post-high school certificate or diploma, and 129 (30.3%) people exclusively held high school qualifications. The median income was $47,600, compared with $41,500 nationally. 51 people (12.0%) earned over $100,000 compared to 12.1% nationally. The employment status of those at least 15 was 237 (55.6%) full-time, 81 (19.0%) part-time, and 6 (1.4%) unemployed.

== Education ==
Manaia School is a coeducational full primary (years 1–8) school with a roll of 54 as of July 2026. The school was founded in 1882. In 2005, Tokaora School closed and merged with Manaia School.

== Climate ==
Climate data for Manaia (1981–2010)
Month	Jan	Feb	Mar	Apr	May	Jun	Jul	Aug	Sep	Oct	Nov	Dec	Year
Mean daily maximum °C (°F)	20.8 (69.4)	21.3 (70.3)	19.9 (67.8)	17.5 (63.5)	15.4 (59.7)	13.4 (56.1)	12.6 (54.7)	13.1 (55.6)	14.5 (58.1)	15.6 (60.1)	17.4 (63.3)	19.5 (67.1)	16.8 (62.1)
Daily mean °C (°F)	16.6 (61.9)	16.9 (62.4)	15.5 (59.9)	13.2 (55.8)	11.6 (52.9)	9.7 (49.5)	8.9 (48.0)	9.2 (48.6)	10.6 (51.1)	11.7 (53.1)	13.1 (55.6)	15.2 (59.4)	12.7 (54.9)
Mean daily minimum °C (°F)	12.3 (54.1)	12.6 (54.7)	11.0 (51.8)	9.0 (48.2)	7.9 (46.2)	5.9 (42.6)	5.1 (41.2)	5.4 (41.7)	6.7 (44.1)	7.8 (46.0)	8.8 (47.8)	10.9 (51.6)	8.6 (47.5)
Average rainfall mm (inches)	86.7 (3.41)	83.1 (3.27)	96.1 (3.78)	60.4 (2.38)	99.3 (3.91)	106.7 (4.20)	112.5 (4.43)	70.2 (2.76)	82.6 (3.25)	104.3 (4.11)	93.3 (3.67)	77.0 (3.03)	1,072.2 (42.2)
Mean monthly sunshine hours	240.2	197.9	169.4	168.2	119.7	90.6	117.9	127.6	131.2	163.0	184.3	219.0	1,929
Source: NIWA
