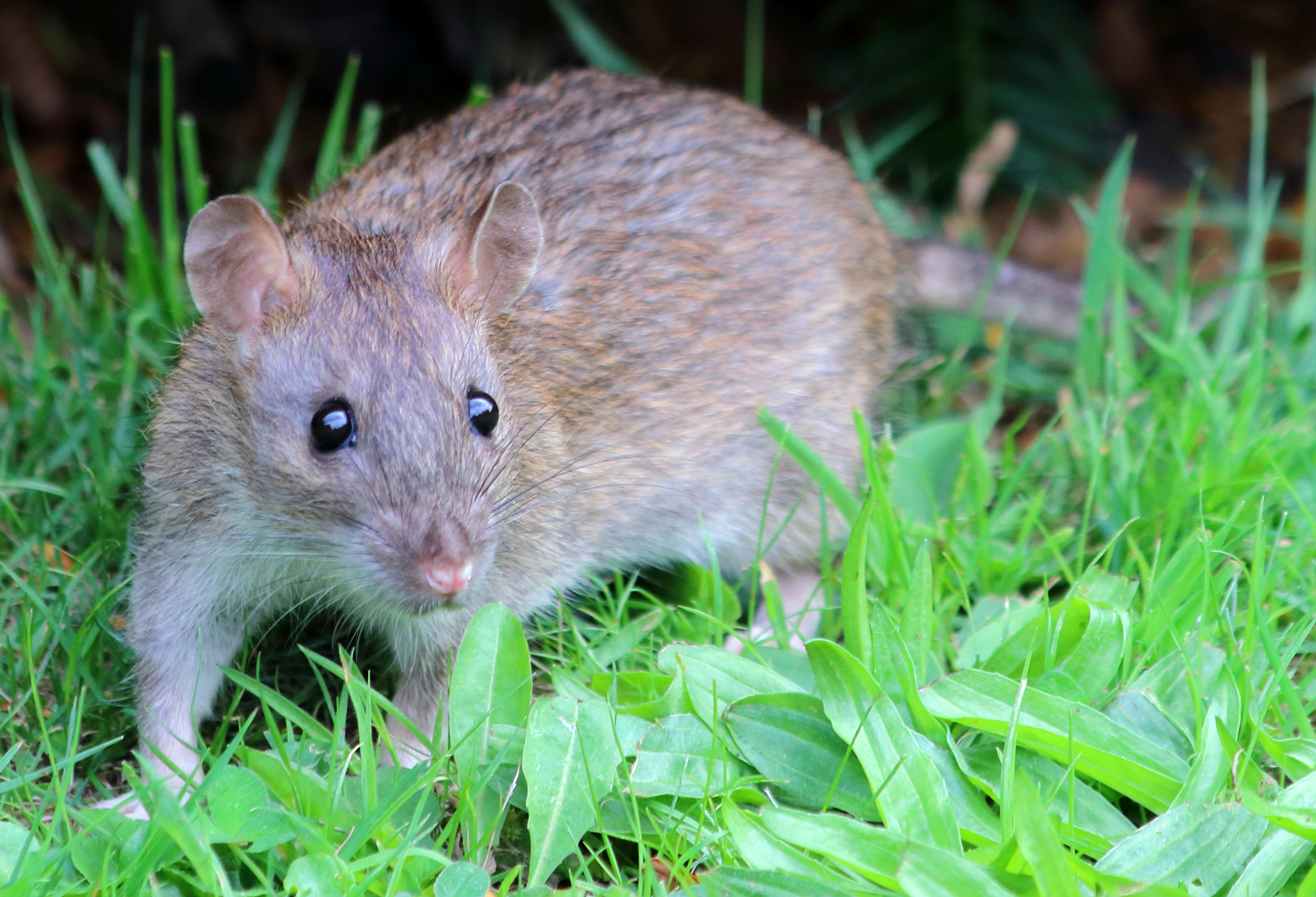
- A brown rat in England

Conservation status
- Least Concern (IUCN 3.1)

Scientific classification
- Kingdom: Animalia
- Phylum: Chordata
- Class: Mammalia
- Order: Rodentia
- Family: Muridae
- Genus: Rattus
- Species: R. norvegicus

Binomial name
- Rattus norvegicus (Berkenhout, 1769)

Synonyms
- Mus norvegicus

= Brown rat =

Brown rat Temporal range: Early Holocene - Recent

Species of common rat

The brown rat (Rattus norvegicus), also known as the common rat, street rat, sewer rat, wharf rat, Hanover rat, Norway rat and Norwegian rat, is a widespread, common species of rat. One of the largest muroids, it is a brown or grey rodent with a body length of up to 28 cm (11 in) long, and a tail slightly shorter than that. It weighs between 140 and 500 g (4.9 and 17.6 oz). Thought to have originated in northern China and neighbouring areas, it has now spread to all continents except Antarctica, and is the dominant rat in Europe and much of North America, having become naturalised across the world. With rare exceptions, the brown rat lives wherever humans live, particularly in urban areas. It is omnivorous, reproduces rapidly, and can be a vector for several human diseases.

Selective breeding of the brown rat has produced the fancy rat (rats kept as pets), as well as the laboratory rat (rats used as model organisms in biological research). Both fancy rats and laboratory rats are of the domesticated subspecies Rattus norvegicus domestica. Studies of wild rats in New York City have shown that populations living in different neighborhoods can evolve distinct genomic profiles over time, by slowly accruing different traits.

== Naming and etymology ==
The brown rat was originally called the "Hanover rat" by people wishing to link problems in 18th-century England with the House of Hanover. It is not known for certain why the brown rat is named Rattus norvegicus (Norwegian rat), as it did not originate from Norway. However, the English naturalist John Berkenhout, author of the 1769 book Outlines of the Natural History of Great Britain, is most likely responsible for popularizing the misnomer. Berkenhout gave the brown rat the binomial name Mus norvegicus, believing it had migrated to England from Norwegian ships in 1728.

By the early to the middle part of the 19th century, British academics believed that the brown rat was not native to Norway, hypothesizing (incorrectly) that it may have come from Ireland, Gibraltar or across the English Channel with William the Conqueror. As early as 1850, however, a new hypothesis of the rat's origins was beginning to develop. The British novelist Charles Dickens acknowledged this in his weekly journal, All the Year Round, writing:

It is frequently called, in books and otherwise, the 'Norway rat', and it is said to have been imported into this country in a ship-load of timber from Norway. Against this hypothesis stands the fact that when the brown rat had become common in this country, it was unknown in Norway, although there was a small animal like a rat, but really a lemming, which made its home there.

Academics began to prefer this etymology of the brown rat towards the end of the 19th century, as seen in the 1895 text Natural History by American scholar Alfred Henry Miles:

The brown rat is the species common in England, and best known throughout the world. It is said to have travelled from Persia to England less than two hundred years ago and to have spread from thence to other countries visited by English ships.

Though the assumptions surrounding this species' origins were not yet the same as modern ones, by the 20th century, it was believed among naturalists that the brown rat did not originate in Norway, rather the species came from Central Asia and (likely) China.

== Description ==
Comparison of the physique of a black rat (R. rattus) with a brown rat (R. norvegicus)

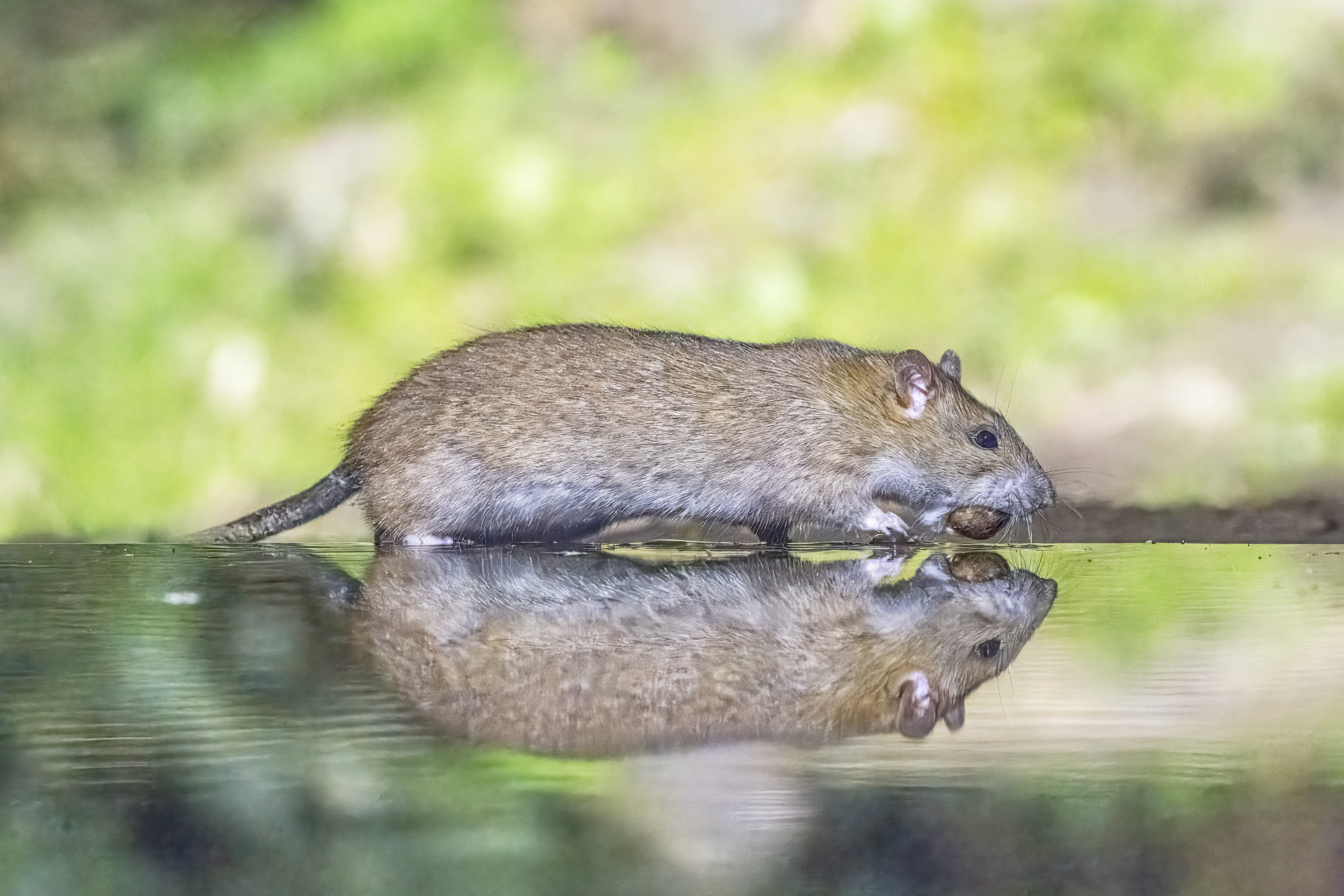
Brown rat in the Netherlands seen in side-on view

The brown rat's fur is usually brown or dark grey, while the underparts are lighter grey or brown. The brown rat is a rather large murid and can weigh twice as much as a black rat (R. rattus) and many times more than a house mouse (Mus musculus). The head and body length ranges from 15 to 28 cm (5.9 to 11.0 in) while the tail ranges in length from 10.5 to 24 cm (4.1 to 9.4 in), therefore being shorter than the head and body. Adult weight ranges from 140 to 500 g (4.9 to 17.6 oz). Large individuals can reach 800 g (28 oz) but are not expected outside of domestic specimens. Stories of rats attaining sizes as big as cats are exaggerations, or misidentifications of larger rodents. It is common for breeding wild brown rats to weigh less than 300 g (11 oz). The heaviest live brown rat on record is 822 g (29 oz) and they can reach a maximum length of 482.5 mm (19 in).

The brown rat has acute hearing, is sensitive to ultrasound, and possesses a very highly developed olfactory sense. Its average heart rate is 300 to 400 beats per minute, with a respiratory rate of around 100 per minute. The vision of a pigmented rat is poor, around 20/600, while a non-pigmented with no melanin in its eyes has both around 20/1200 vision and a terrible scattering of light within its vision. It is a dichromat which perceives colours rather like a human with red-green colorblindness, and its colour saturation may be quite faint. The blue perception, however, also has UV receptors, allowing it to see ultraviolet lights that humans and some other species cannot.

== Biology and behavior ==
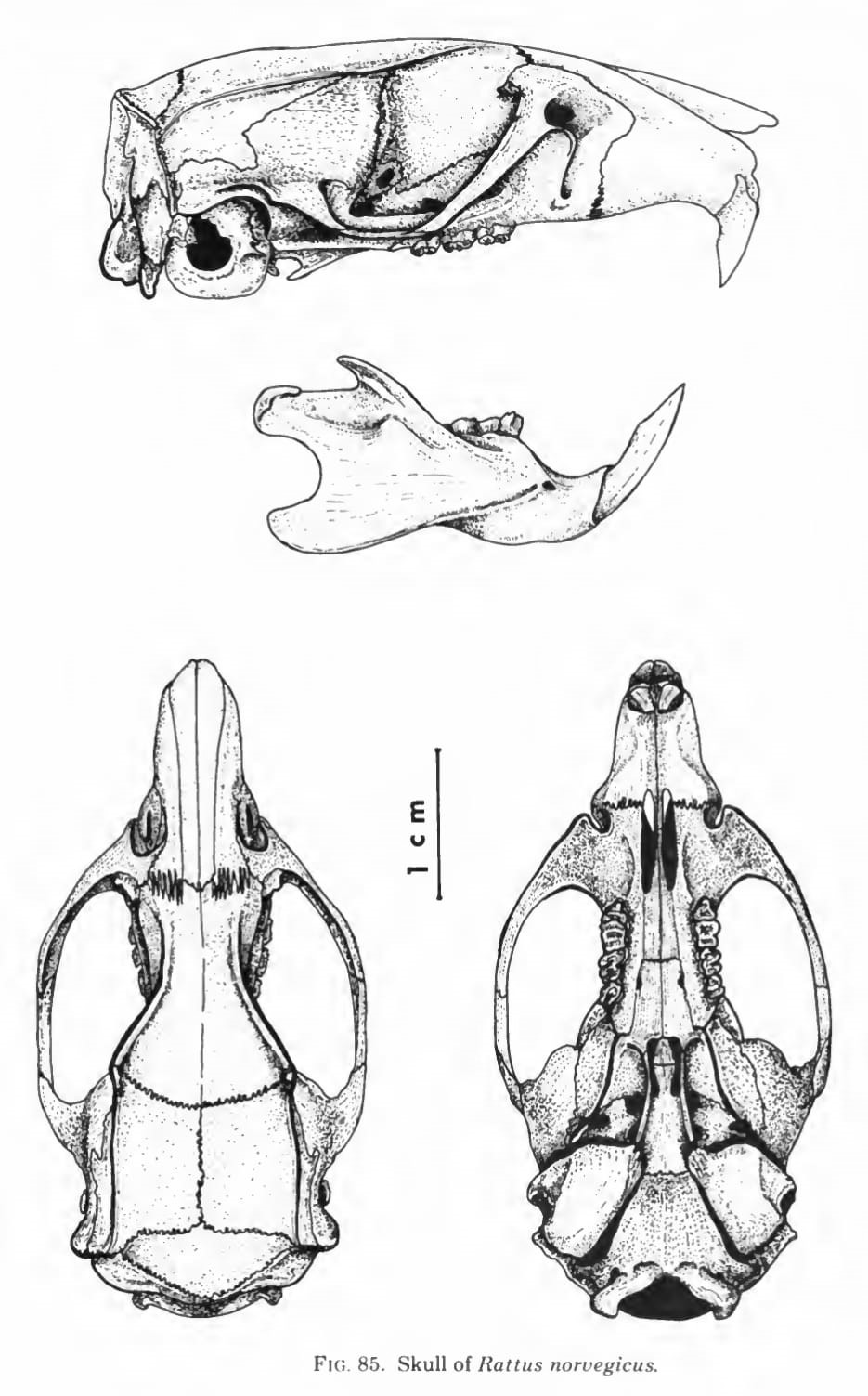
Brown rat skull

The brown rat is nocturnal and is a good swimmer, both on the surface and underwater, and has been observed climbing slim round metal poles several feet in order to reach garden bird feeders. Brown rats dig well, and often excavate extensive burrow systems. A 2007 study found brown rats to possess metacognition, a mental ability previously only found in humans and some other primates, but further analysis suggested they may have been following simple operant conditioning principles.

=== Communication ===
Brown rats are capable of producing ultrasonic vocalizations. As pups, young rats use different types of ultrasonic cries to elicit and direct maternal search behavior, as well as to regulate their mother's movements in the nest. Although pups produce ultrasounds around any other rats at the age of 7 days, by 14 days old they significantly reduce ultrasound production around male rats as a defensive response. Adult rats will emit ultrasonic vocalizations in response to predators or perceived danger; the frequency and duration of such cries depends on the sex and reproductive status of the rat. The female rat also emits ultrasonic vocalizations during mating.

Rats may also emit short, high frequency, ultrasonic, socially induced vocalization during rough and tumble play, before receiving morphine, or mating, and when tickled. The vocalization, described as a distinct "chirping", has been likened to laughter, and is interpreted as an expectation of something rewarding. Like most rat vocalizations, the chirping is too high in pitch for humans to hear without special equipment. Bat detectors are often used by pet owners for this purpose.

In research studies, the chirping is associated with positive emotional feelings, and social bonding occurs with the tickler, resulting in the rats becoming conditioned to seek the tickling. However, as the rats age, the tendency to chirp appears to decline.

Brown rats also produce communicative noises capable of being heard by humans. The most commonly heard in domestic rats is bruxing, or teeth-grinding, which is most usually triggered by happiness, but can also be 'self-comforting' in stressful situations, such as a visit to the vet. The noise is best described as either a quick clicking or 'burring' sound, varying from animal to animal. Vigorous bruxing can be accompanied by boggling, where the eyes of the rat rapidly bulge and retract due to movement of the lower jaw muscles behind the eye socket.

In addition, they commonly squeak along a range of tones from high, abrupt pain squeaks to soft, persistent 'singing' sounds during confrontations.

=== Diet ===
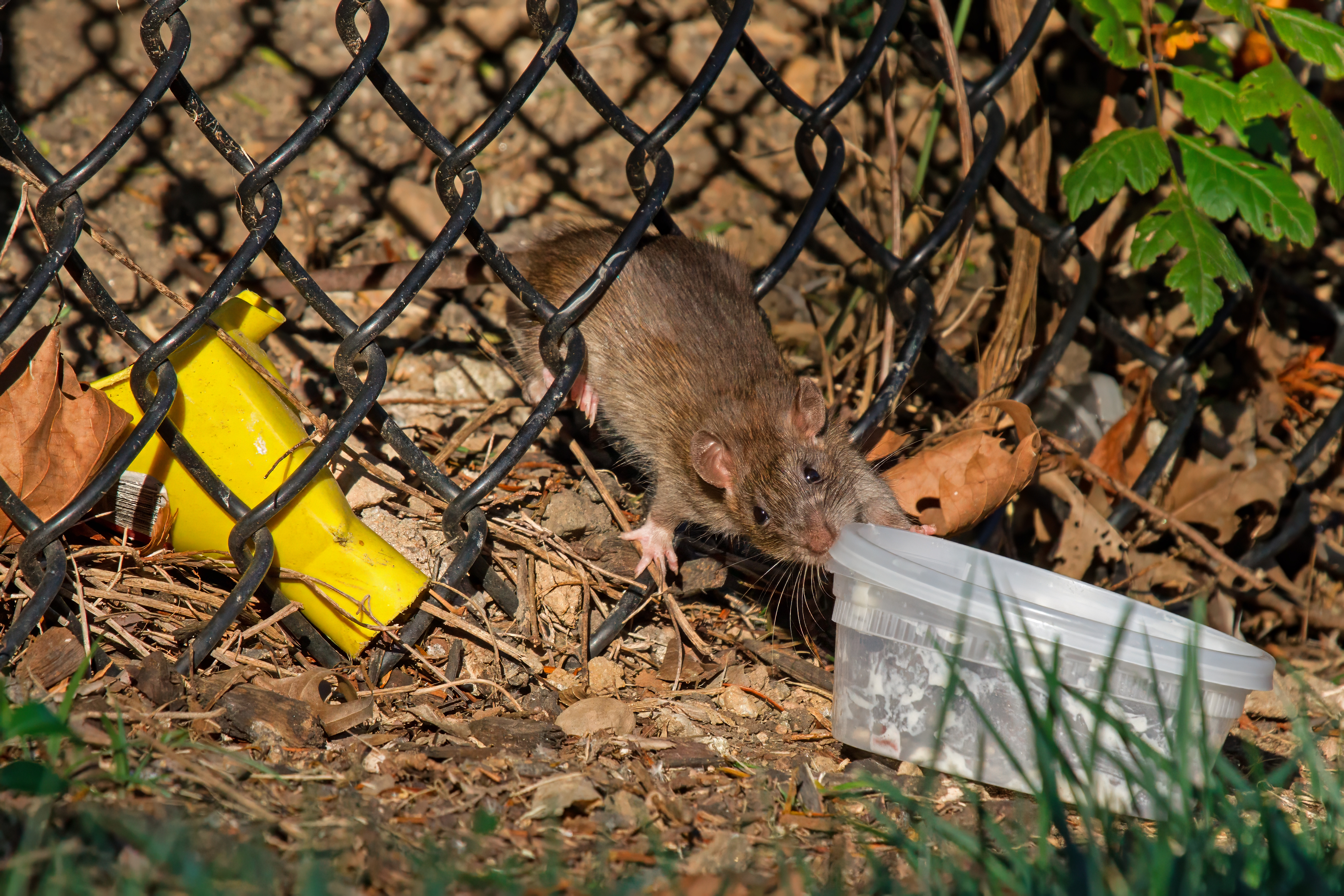
A brown rat opening a discarded plastic food container in a park.

The brown rat is a true omnivore and consumes almost anything, but cereals form a substantial part of its diet. The most-liked foods of brown rats include scrambled eggs, raw carrots, and cooked corn kernels. The least-liked foods are raw beets, peaches and raw celery. Foraging behavior is often population-specific, and varies by environment and food source. Brown rats living near a hatchery in West Virginia catch fingerling fish. Some colonies along the banks of the Po River in Italy dive for mollusks, a practice demonstrating social learning among members of this species. Rats on the island of Norderoog in the North Sea stalk and kill sparrows and ducks.

Also preyed upon by brown rats are chicks, mice and small lizards. Examination of a wild brown rat stomachs in Germany revealed 4,000 food items, most of which were plants, although studies have shown that brown rats prefer meat when given the option. In metropolitan areas, they survive mainly on discarded human food and anything else that can be eaten without negative consequences.

=== Reproduction and life cycle ===
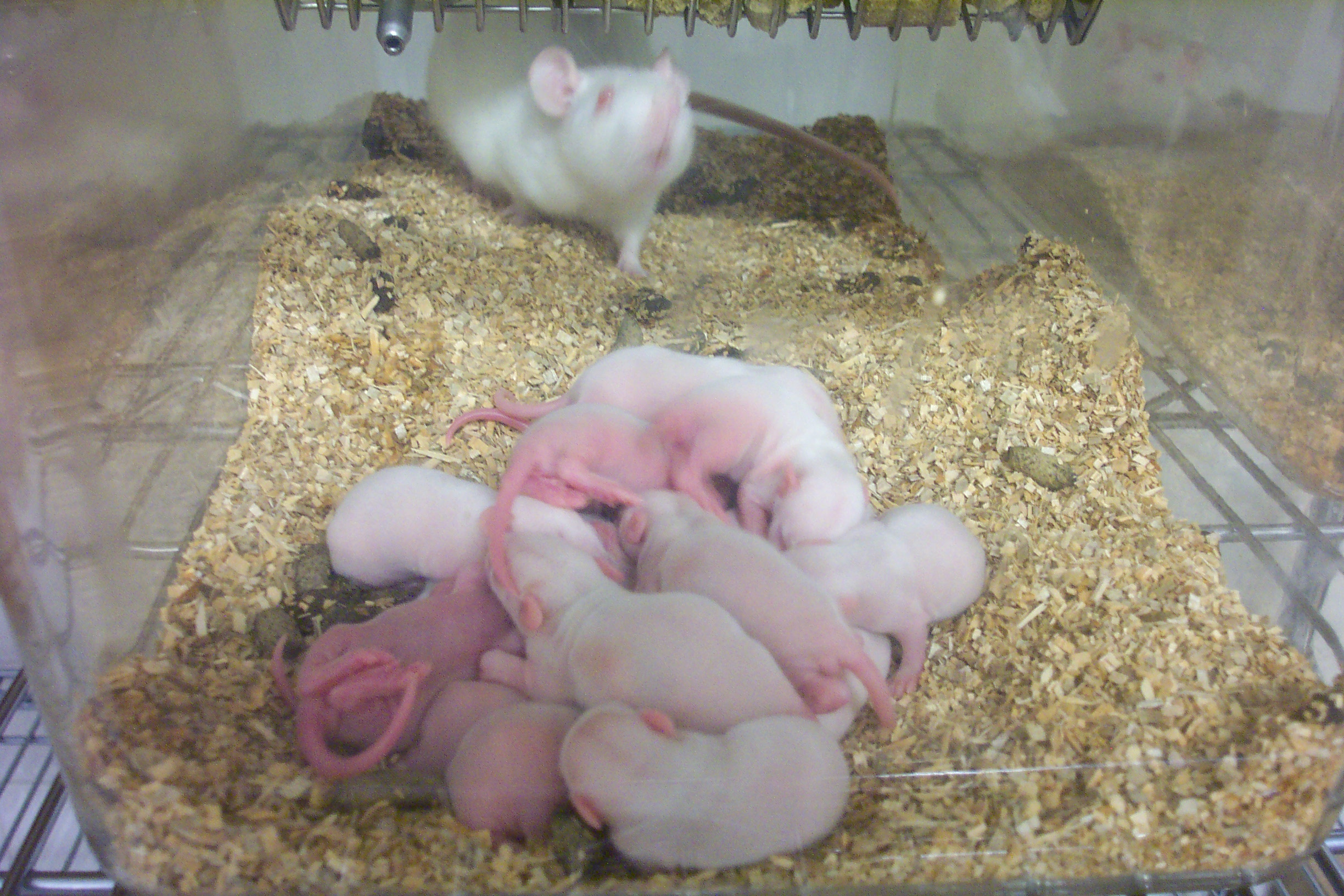
Baby brown rats

The brown rat can breed throughout the year if conditions are suitable, with a female producing up to five litters a year. The gestation period is only 21 days, and litters can number up to 14, although seven is common. They weigh an average of 6 g (0.2 oz) at birth. They reach sexual maturity in about five weeks. Under ideal conditions (for the rat), this means that the population of females could increase by a factor of three and a half (half a litter of 7) in 8 weeks (5 weeks for sexual maturity and 3 weeks of gestation), corresponding to a population growing by a factor of 10 in just 15 weeks. As a result, the population can grow from 2 to 15,000 in a year. The maximum life span is three years, although most barely manage one. A yearly mortality rate of 95% is estimated, with predators and interspecies conflict as major causes.

When lactating, female rats display a 24-hour rhythm of maternal behavior, and will usually spend more time attending to smaller litters than large ones.

Brown rats live in large, hierarchical groups, either in burrows or subsurface places, such as sewers and cellars. When food is in short supply, the rats lower in social order are the first to die. If a large fraction of a rat population is exterminated, the remaining rats will increase their reproductive rate, and quickly restore the old population level.

The female is capable of becoming pregnant immediately after giving birth, and can nurse one litter while pregnant with another. She is able to produce and raise two healthy litters of normal size and weight without significantly changing her own food intake. However, when food is restricted, she can extend pregnancy by over two weeks, and give birth to litters of normal number and weight.

=== Mating behaviors ===
Males can ejaculate multiple times in a row, and this increases the likelihood of pregnancy as well as decreases the number of stillborns. Multiple ejaculation also means that males can mate with multiple females, and they exhibit more ejaculatory series when there are several oestrous females present. Males also copulate at shorter intervals than females. In group mating, females often switch partners.

Dominant males have higher mating success and also provide females with more ejaculate, and females are more likely to use the sperm of dominant males for fertilization.

In mating, female rats show a clear mating preference for unknown males versus males that they have already mated with (also known as the Coolidge effect), and will often resume copulatory behavior when introduced to a novel sexual partner.

Females also prefer to mate with males who have not experienced social stress during adolescence, and can determine which males were stressed even without any observed difference in sexual performance of males experiencing stress during adolescence and not.

=== Social behavior ===
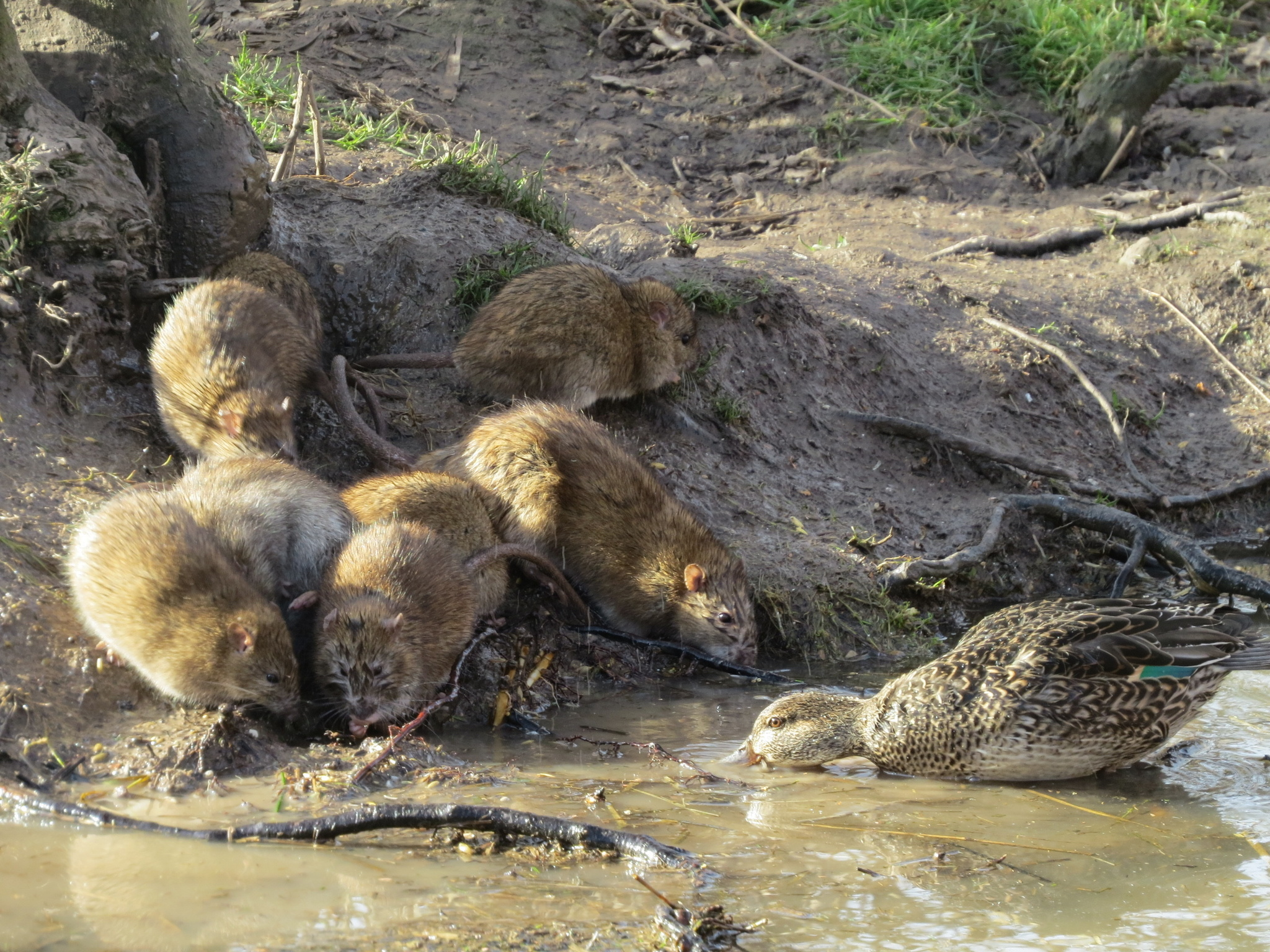
Group of brown rats, in England

Rats commonly groom each other and sleep together. Rats are said to establish an order of hierarchy, so one rat will be dominant over another one. Groups of rats tend to "play fight", which can involve any combination of jumping, chasing, tumbling, and "boxing". Play fighting involves rats going for each other's necks, while serious fighting involves strikes at the others' back ends. If living space becomes limited, rats may turn to aggressive behavior, which may result in the death of some animals, reducing the burden over the living space.

Rats, like most mammals, also form family groups of a mother and her young. This applies to both groups of males and females. However, rats are territorial animals, meaning that they usually act aggressively towards or scared of strange rats. Rats will fluff up their hair, hiss, squeal, and move their tails around when defending their territory. Rats will chase each other, groom each other, sleep in group nests, wrestle with each other, have dominance squabbles, communicate, and play in various other ways with each other. Huddling is an additional important part of rat socialization. Huddling, an extreme form of herding and like chattering or "bruxing" is often used to communicate that they are feeling threatened and not to come near. The common rat has been more successful at inhabiting and building communities on 6 continents and are the only species to have occupied more land than humans.

During the wintry months, rats will huddle into piles – usually cheek-to-cheek – to control humidity and keep the air warm as a heat-conserving function. Just like elderly rats are commonly groomed and nursed by their companions, nestling rats especially depend on heat from their mother, since they cannot regulate their own temperature. Other forms of interaction include: crawling under, which is literally the act of crawling underneath one another (this is common when the rat is feeling ill and helps them breathe); walking over to find a space next to their closest friend, also explained in the name; allo-grooming, so-called to distinguish it from self-grooming; and nosing, where a rat gently pushes with its nose at another rat near the neck.

=== Burrowing ===
Rats are known to burrow extensively, both in the wild and in captivity, if given access to a suitable substrate. Rats generally begin a new burrow adjacent to an object or structure, as this provides a sturdy "roof" for the section of the burrow nearest to the ground's surface. Burrows usually develop to eventually include multiple levels of tunnels, as well as a secondary entrance. Older male rats will generally not burrow, while young males and females will burrow vigorously.

Burrows provide rats with shelter and food storage, as well as safe, thermo-regulated nest sites. Rats use their burrows to escape from perceived threats in the surrounding environment; for example, rats will retreat to their burrows following a sudden, loud noise or while fleeing an intruder. Burrowing can therefore be described as a "pre-encounter defensive behavior", as opposed to a "post-encounter defensive behavior", such as flight, freezing, or avoidance of a threatening stimulus.

== Evolution ==
Brown rats' ancestors diverged from the black rat lineage approximately 2.9 million years ago. Evidence collected from mitochondrial genomes suggests that they emerged as a separate species anywhere from 0.5 to 2.9 million years ago. Brown rats have two sister species within the norvegicus group. The Himalayan field rat (Rattus nitidus) has recently been identified as closely related, with mitochondrial DNA suggesting divergence around 700 thousand years ago. However, genetic intermixing between these species is believed to have continued after this separation. Re-encounters between Himalayan and brown rat populations led to the introgression of genes from the former into the latter. This allowed for adaptations in olfactory receptors to be spread to brown rats. Another sister species, the Turkestan rat, has been found close to the brown rat's ancestral range in Nepal. No such cases of genetic mixing between Turkestan and brown rats have been documented thus far.

=== Adaptations in laboratory populations ===
Brown rats' interactions with human environments have resulted in a number of identifiable changes in traits. This is especially well documented in laboratory rats. Despite significant levels of inbreeding through artificial selection, domesticated laboratory rats maintain higher genetic diversity than laboratory mice. Population structure among strains of domesticated rats is so powerful that distinctions are detectable between rats bred in different rooms of the same facilities. The earliest evidence of differentiation from wild populations is the early proliferation of color variants among domesticated strains. This was documented in the 18th century in Japan and by the 19th century in Europe.

Today's laboratory rats exhibit physical and behavioral adaptations. Rats bred for laboratory use develop smaller testes and have smaller neocortexes. They struggle significantly more with digging and swimming than wild rats when placed under identical conditions. This latter difference results in an aversion in domesticated rats that allows researchers to test memory using the Morris water maze. Rats will recall an unseen platform's location in a pool and swim to it to avoid treading water. Other differences contribute to testing in more direct fashions; domesticated rats are able to learn faster and have lower resting levels of stress hormones. On the other hand, laboratory rats' increased agonistic behavior is less beneficial and not intentionally selected for. A mixture of artificial selection and random variation through genetic drift is likely responsible for these differences.

Unique adaptations have been observed in albino strains of laboratory rats. Albinos have smaller visual cortices and are less active during the day than their pigmented counterparts. Both of these adaptations are believed to be connected to their diminished visual acuity.

Differences between laboratory rats and wild populations have led to increasing concerns over the representativeness of psychological studies using inbred strains. Some researchers point to the effects of selective breeding on fear response and brain size as warping the results' applicability to human fear mechanisms.

=== Adaptations in wild populations ===
Like laboratory strains, wild populations in human-occupied environments show significant genetic variation. Urban environments present substantial barriers to movement that may restrict brown rat populations to single city blocks. These lead to differentiated population structures between regions of the same city, as demonstrated in New York, Vancouver, and Salvador. Roadways and districts with low levels of garbage were found to separate populations and restrict gene flow among groups.

Particular attention has been given to the adaptations found in the New York City population. New York rats have longer noses and shorter molar rows than the Chinese population; these are hypothesized to be adaptations to a colder climate and a diet including human food, respectively. Genetic markers also show differences in regions associated with the metabolism and diet of New York rats. However, metabolic differences have also been connected to migrating populations prior to relocation in urban settlements. Immune response changes from this period are suspected to have enabled the eventual domestication of brown rats in Europe.

Population bottlenecks are a significant source of adaptation. Such a bottleneck is theorized to have occurred 20,000 years ago in the ancestral Chinese population, and similar reductions due to founder effects have been observed as invasive populations spread to new areas. A notable recent instance of bottleneck-induced adaptation is the rise of rodenticide resistance among wild brown rats. Resistance to warfarin was discovered in urban populations in the mid-20th century, prompting the synthesis of new forms of rodenticide. Some populations in the United Kingdom have also been found to resist the second-generation rodenticides developed. Behavioral adaptations have also made effective rodenticide more difficult to provide; fear of new stimuli in wild populations has been linked to the widespread presence of rodenticide. This fear is markedly reduced in domesticated populations. Many wild rats without the genes associated with the adaptations for rodenticide resistance are found to be able to accumulate rodenticide residue in their liver, sometimes above known toxic thresholds. This accumulation of rodenticide anticoagulants in rats is thought to be associated with the secondary poisoning of predator species, particularly raptors.

== Distribution and habitat ==
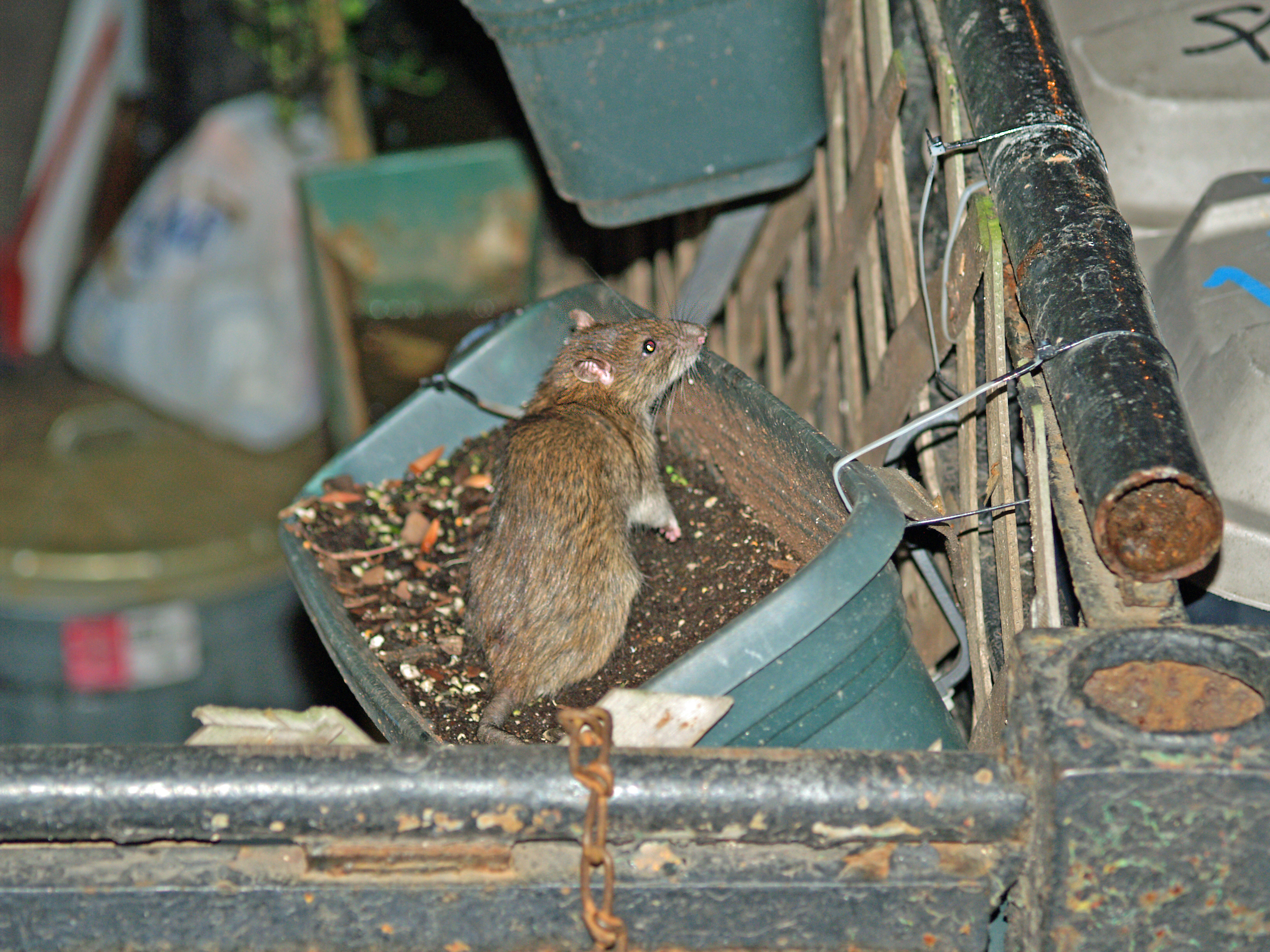
A brown rat in a flower box in the East Village of New York City

Possibly originating from the plains of northern China and Mongolia, the brown rat spread to other parts of the world sometime in the Middle Ages. The question of when brown rats became commensal with humans remains unsettled, but as a species, they have spread and established themselves along routes of human migration, and they now primarily share their habitat with humans.

The brown rat may have been present in Europe as early as 1553, a conclusion drawn from an illustration and description by Swiss naturalist Conrad Gessner in his book Historiae animalium, published 1551–1558. Though Gesner's description could apply to the black rat, his mention of a large percentage of albino specimens—not uncommon among wild populations of brown rats—adds credibility to this conclusion. Reliable reports dating to the 18th century document the presence of the brown rat in Ireland in 1722, England in 1730, France in 1735, Germany in 1750, and Spain in 1800, becoming widespread during the Industrial Revolution. It did not reach North America until around 1750–1755.

Historia animalium ("History of the Animals"): Page 829, Rat

As it spread from Asia, the brown rat generally displaced the black rat in areas where humans lived. In addition to being larger and more aggressive, the change from wooden structures and thatched roofs to bricked and tiled buildings favored the burrowing brown rats over the arboreal black rats. In addition, brown rats eat a wider variety of foods, and are more resistant to weather extremes.

In the absence of humans, brown rats prefer damp environments, such as river banks. However, the great majority are now linked to man-made environments, such as sewage systems. In addition to sewers, rats are very comfortable living in alleyways and residential buildings, as there is usually a large and continuous food source in those areas.

It is often said that there are as many rats in cities as people, but this is considered an urban myth for most cities. Brown rats in cities tend not to wander extensively, often staying within 20 m (66 ft) of their nest if a suitable concentrated food supply is available, but they will range more widely where food availability is lower. It is difficult to determine the extent of their home range because they do not utilize a whole area but rather use regular runways to get from one location to another. Urban rat research is considered to be challenging due to their significant global population size and spatial distribution patterns. There is great debate over the size of the population of rats in New York City, with estimates from almost 100 million rats to as few as 250,000. Experts suggest that New York is a particularly attractive place for rats because of its aging infrastructure and high poverty rates. In 2023, the city appointed Kathleen Corradi as the first Rat Czar, a position created to address the city's rat population. The position focuses on instituting policies measures to curb the population such as garbage regulation and additional rat trapping. A 2024 study using data from Vancouver found that most municipal complaints about rats were related to garbage, and the rats were often viewed as a symptom of a community issue.

In the United Kingdom, some figures show that the rat population has been rising, with estimations that 81 million rats reside in the UK. Those figures would mean that there are 1.3 rats per person in the country. High rat populations in the UK are often attributed to the mild climate, which allows them higher survival rates during the winter. With the increase in global temperature and glacier retreat, it is estimated that brown rat populations will see an increase.

In tropical and desert regions, brown rat occurrence tends to be limited to human-modified habitats. Contiguous rat-free areas in the world include the continent of Antarctica, the Arctic, some isolated islands, the Canadian province of Alberta, and certain conservation areas in New Zealand. Most of Australia apart from the eastern and south-eastern coastal areas does not have reports of substantial rat occurrences.

Antarctica is uninhabitable by rats. The Arctic has extremely cold winters that rats cannot survive outdoors, and the human population density is extremely low, making it difficult for rats to travel from one habitation to another, although they have arrived in many coastal areas by ship. When the occasional rat infestation is found and eliminated, the rats are unable to re-infest it from an adjacent one. Isolated islands are also able to eliminate rat populations because of low human population density and the geographic distance from other rat populations.

=== Rats as invasive species ===
Many parts of the world have been populated by rats secondarily, where rats are now important invasive species that compete with and threaten local fauna. For instance, Norway rats reached North America between 1750 and 1775 and even in the early 20th century, from 1925 to 1927, 50% of ships entering the port of New York were rat-infested.

==== Faroe Islands ====
The brown rat was first observed on the Faroe Islands in 1768. It is thought that the first individuals arrived on the southernmost island, Suðuroy, via the wreck of a Norwegian ship that had stranded on the Scottish Isle of Lewis on its way from Trondheim to Dublin. The drifting wreck, carrying brown rats, drifted northwards until it reached the village of Hvalba. Dispersion afterwards appears to have been fast, including all of Suðuroy within a year. In 1769, they were observed in Tórshavn on the southern part of Streymoy, and a decade later, in the villages in the northern part of this island. From here, they crossed the strait and occupied Eysturoy during the years 1776 to 1779. In 1779, they reached Vagar. Whether the rats dispersed from the already established population in Suðuroy, or they were brought to the Faroe Islands with other ships is unknown. The Northern islands were invaded by the brown rat more than 100 years later, after Norwegians built and operated a whaling station in the village of Hvannasund on Borðoy from 1898 to 1920. From there, the brown rat spread to the neighbouring islands of Viðoy and Kunoy. A recent genomic analysis reveals three independent introductions of the invasive brown rat to the Faroe Islands.

Today the brown rat is found on seven of the eighteen Faroese islands, and is common in and around human habitations as well as in the wild. Although the brown rat is now common on all of the largest Faroese islands, only sparse information on the population is available in the literature. An investigation for infection with the spirochaete Leptospira interrogans did not find any infected animals, suggesting that Leptospira prevalence rates on the Faroe Islands may be among the lowest recorded worldwide.

==== Alaska ====
Hawadax Island (formerly known as Rat Island) in Alaska is thought to have been the first island in the Aleutians to be invaded by Norway rats (the Brown rat) when a Japanese ship went aground in the 1780s. They had a devastating effect on the native bird life. The rats preyed on eggs and chicks of seabirds and shorebirds, eliminating many breeding bird populations. The loss of shorebird predators caused a trophic cascade in the rocky intertidal ecosystem, increasing grazing invertebrates and reducing algal cover. An eradication program was started in 2007 and the island was declared rat-free in June 2009. From 2008 onwards, shorebird populations recovered and the intertidal community gradually returned toward the structure observed on rat-free islands.

==== Alberta ====
Alberta is the largest rat-free, human-populated area in the world. Rat invasions of Alberta were stopped and rats were eliminated by very aggressive government rat control measures, starting during the 1950s.

The only Rattus species that is capable of surviving the climate of Alberta is the brown rat, which can only survive in the prairie region of the province, and even then must overwinter in buildings. Although it is a major agricultural area, Alberta is far from any seaport and only a portion of its eastern boundary with Saskatchewan provides a favorable entry route for rats. Brown rats cannot survive in the wild boreal forest to the north, the Rocky Mountains to the west, nor can they safely cross the semiarid High Plains of Montana to the south. The first brown rat did not reach Alberta until 1950, and in 1951, the province launched a rat-control program that included shooting, poisoning, and gassing rats, and bulldozing or burning down some rat-infested buildings. The effort was backed by legislation that required every person and every municipality to destroy and prevent the establishment of designated pests. If they failed, the provincial government could carry out the necessary measures and charge the costs to the landowner or municipality.

In the first year of the rat control program, 64 t (71 short tons) of arsenic trioxide were spread throughout 8,000 buildings on farms along the Saskatchewan border. However, in 1953 the much safer and more effective rodenticide warfarin was introduced to replace arsenic. Warfarin is an anticoagulant that was approved as a drug for human use in 1954 and is much safer to use near humans and other large animals than arsenic. By 1960, the number of rat infestations in Alberta had dropped to below 200 per year. In 2002, the province finally recorded its first year with zero rat infestations, and from 2002 to 2007 there were only two infestations found. After an infestation of rats in the Medicine Hat landfill was found in 2012, the province's rat-free status was questioned, but provincial government rat control specialists brought in excavating machinery, dug out, shot, and poisoned 147 rats in the landfill, and no live rats were found thereafter. In 2013, the number of rat infestations in Alberta dropped to zero again. Alberta defines an infestation as two or more rats found at the same location, since a single rat cannot reproduce. About a dozen single rats enter Alberta in an average year and are killed by provincial rat control specialists before they can reproduce.

Only zoos, universities, and research institutes are allowed to keep caged rats in Alberta, and possession of unlicensed rats, including fancy rats, by anyone else is punishable by a penalty of up to C$5,000 or up to 60 days in jail. The adjacent and similarly landlocked province of Saskatchewan initiated a rat control program in 1972, and has managed to reduce the number of rats in the province substantially, although they have not been eliminated. The Saskatchewan rat control program has considerably reduced the number of rats trying to enter Alberta.

==== New Zealand ====
First arriving before 1800 (perhaps on James Cook's vessels), brown rats pose a serious threat to many of New Zealand's native wildlife. Rat eradication programmes within New Zealand have led to rat-free zones on offshore islands and even on fenced "ecological islands" on the mainland. Before an eradication effort was launched in 2001, the sub-Antarctic Campbell Island had the highest population density of brown rats in the world.

== Diseases ==
Similar to other rodents, brown rats may carry a number of pathogens, which can result in disease, including Weil's disease, rat bite fever, cryptosporidiosis, viral hemorrhagic fever, Q fever and hantavirus pulmonary syndrome. In the United Kingdom, brown rats are an important reservoir for Coxiella burnetii, the bacterium that causes Q fever, with seroprevalence for the bacteria found to be as high as 53% in some wild populations.

This species can also serve as a reservoir for Toxoplasma gondii, the parasite that causes toxoplasmosis, though the disease usually spreads from rats to humans when domestic cats feed on infected brown rats. The parasite has a long history with the brown rat, and there are indications that the parasite has evolved to alter an infected rat's perception to cat predation, making it more susceptible to predation and increasing the likelihood of transmission.

Surveys and specimens of brown rat populations throughout the world have shown this species is often associated with outbreaks of trichinosis, but the extent to which the brown rat is responsible in transmitting Trichinella larvae to humans and other synanthropic animals is at least somewhat debatable. Trichinella pseudospiralis, a parasite previously not considered to be a potential pathogen in humans or domestic animals, has been found to be pathogenic in humans and carried by brown rats.

They can also be responsible for transmitting Angiostrongylus larvae to humans by eating raw or undercooked snails, slugs, molluscs, crustaceans, water and/or vegetables contaminated with them.

Brown rats are sometimes mistakenly thought to be a major reservoir of bubonic plague, a possible cause of the Black Death. However, the bacterium responsible, Yersinia pestis, is commonly endemic in only a few rodent species and is usually transmitted zoonotically by rat fleas—common carrier rodents today include ground squirrels and wood rats. However, brown rats may suffer from plague, as can many nonrodent species, including dogs, cats, and humans. During investigations of the plague epidemic in San Francisco in 1907, >1% of collected rats were infected with Y. pestis. The original carrier for the plague-infected fleas thought to be responsible for the Black Death was the black rat (Rattus rattus), and it has been hypothesized that the displacement of black rats by brown rats led to the decline of bubonic plague. This theory has, however, been deprecated, as the dates of these displacements do not match the increases and decreases in plague outbreaks.

During the COVID-19 pandemic, one study of New York City sewer rats showed that 17 percent of the city's brown rat population had become infected with SARS-CoV-2.

== In captivity ==
=== Uses in science ===
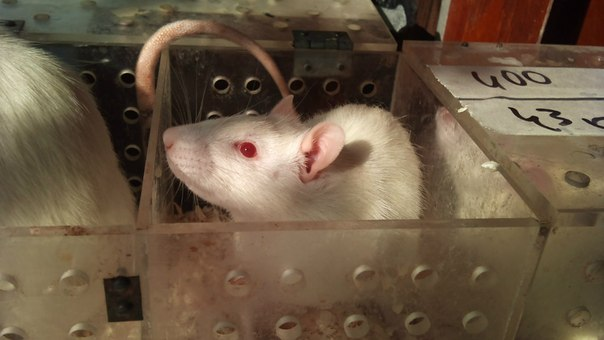
A laboratory rat in a Skinner box

Selective breeding of white-marked rats rescued from being killed in a now-outlawed sport called rat baiting has produced the pink-eyed white laboratory rat. Like mice, these rats are frequently subjects of medical, psychological and other biological experiments, and constitute an important model organism. This is because they grow quickly to sexual maturity and are easy to keep and to breed in captivity. When modern biologists refer to "rats", they almost always mean Rattus norvegicus.

=== As pets ===
The brown rat is kept as a pet in many parts of the world. Australia, the United Kingdom, and the United States are just a few of the countries that have formed fancy rat associations similar in nature to the American Kennel Club, establishing standards, orchestrating events, and promoting responsible pet ownership.

The many different types of domesticated brown rats include variations in coat patterns, as well as the style of the coat, such as Hairless or Rex, and more recently developed variations in body size and structure, including dwarf and tailless fancy rats.

=== Working rats ===
A working rat is a rat trained for specific tasks as a working animal. In many cases, working rats are domesticated brown rats. However, other species, notably the Gambian pouched rat, have been trained to assist humans.
