= K9 Killer =

Anti-poaching dog in Kruger National Park, South Africa

- Species: Canis familiaris
- Breed: Belgian Malinois
- Sex: Male
- Died: June 5, 2020
- Occupation: anti-poaching work
- Owner: Amos Mzimba
- Awards: PDSA Gold Medal

K9 Killer was a Belgian Malinois dog that worked with the Kruger National Park's Special Operations team to apprehend rhinoceros poachers in South Africa. On 6 January 2016, he was awarded a PDSA Gold Medal for his anti-poaching work. Amos Mzimba is the owner of K9 Killer.

K9 Killer died June 5, 2020, accompanied by Mzimba.

== Breed background ==
The Belgian Malinois, a working class dog, can be employed for personal protection and scent tracking. They must receive training so they can channel their high energy drive to tasks that their owners have given them. When Belgian Malinois are young, they require a lot of stimuli from their surroundings so that they can get used to them as they grow older.

The Belgian Malinois is a Belgian herding breed that originated from a small town in Belgium called Malines. The other name for a Belgian Malinois is the Chien de Berger (Bair-zhai) Belge (Belzh). This lively and energetic breed can be family friendly with the proper training and care. It can suffer from health problems, like most other breeds, including diseases like retinal atrophy, and hip and elbow dysplasia. Because of its energy and intelligence, the breed was enlisted in World War I.

== Origins ==
K9 Killer's lineage can be followed to the Iraq war and the Belgian Police. His father had parents that served for the United States in the Iraq War. His mother was bred from two Belgian police dogs and was entered into an exchange program and sent to South Africa.

== Canine duties in Kruger National Park ==
In Kruger National Park canines (trained dogs) are used for tracking and apprehending poachers. This work includes scent detection of firearms and illegal animal parts. Once suspects have been detected in the park, K9 Killer is loaded into a helicopter and flown to a drop off location. As of the last 4 years K9 Killer has led to the arrest of 115 poachers in Kruger National Park. In order for K9 Killer to remain on the scent trails of humans he had to be introduced to the scents of animals in Kruger National Park at a young age. This two-year training program desensitized K9 Killer to the smells of animals.

Kruger National Park suffers from rhinoceros poaching almost daily. Rhinoceros poaching has increased from 13 poached rhinos in 2007 to 1,215 in 2014. K9 Killer and Amos Mzimba have aided in the arrests of more than 115 rhinoceros poachers illegally hunting within the park grounds.

== Awards ==
The PDSA Gold Medal was awarded to K9 Killer in January 2016 for his fight against poaching in South Africa. Through the protection of human and animal life, animals must show dedication to their duties in order to receive the honour.

== See also ==
- List of individual dogs
