= Magawa =

Landmine-sniffing rodent (2013–2022)

- Magawa with his PDSA Gold Medal in 2020
- Species: Southern giant pouched rat
- Sex: Male
- Born: November 2013; Sokoine University of Agriculture, Morogoro, Tanzania
- Died: January 2022 (aged 8); Cambodia
- Occupation: Landmine detector
- Employer: APOPO
- Awards: PDSA Gold Medal (2020)

Magawa (November 2013 – January 2022) was a Southern giant pouched rat (Cricetomys ansorgei) that worked as a HeroRAT sniffing out landmines in Cambodia for the non-governmental organization APOPO (in English, Anti-Personnel Landmines Removal Product Development) which trains rats to detect landmines and tuberculosis. Magawa was the most successful landmine-sniffing rat in the organization's history, and received the PDSA Gold Medal in 2020.

== Early life ==
Magawa was born in November 2013 at the APOPO headquarters in the Sokoine University of Agriculture in Morogoro, Tanzania. After being trained to sniff out landmines as a HeroRAT, he was moved to Siem Reap, Cambodia, in 2016 to begin landmine-removal work.

== Career ==
From 2016 to 2021, Magawa cleared more than 22.5 hectares (56 acres) of land in Cambodia. In that time, he found 71 landmines and 38 instances of other unexploded ordnance. Magawa was trained to sniff out TNT in explosives, allowing him to disregard scrap metal that would confuse metal detectors. He was able to search for landmines far faster than humans due to his exceptional sense of smell and light weight, which prevented him from detonating the mines. He received the PDSA Gold Medal on September 25, 2020, for his work, and was the first rat to do so. Magawa was the most successful mine-sniffing rat in APOPO's history when he received his medal, and was described by the program's manager in Cambodia as a "very exceptional rat" upon his retirement.

== Retirement and death ==
Magawa retired from bomb sniffing in June 2021 owing to his old age, as is standard for APOPO's HeroRATs. He spent a number of weeks mentoring 20 newly-recruited rats before ultimately retiring to a life of "snacking on bananas and peanuts". Magawa died peacefully in early January 2022, and was the organization's most successful HeroRAT at the time of his death. A stone statue honoring Magawa was unveiled in Siem Reap on April 4, 2026, to commemorate International Day for Mine Awareness and Assistance in Mine Action.
