= Orca (dog) =

Golden Retriever assistance dog

- Orca at ten years old
- Species: Canis lupus familiaris
- Breed: Golden Retriever
- Sex: Male
- Born: 13 November 2001
- Died: 5 November 2014 (aged 12)
- Occupation: Assistance dog
- Owner: Cheryl Alexander
- Awards: PDSA Gold Medal; Pro Dogs Silver Medal

Orca was a male Golden Retriever trained by the UK charity Canine Partners as an assistance dog. As of 2007 he was one of 12 dogs to be awarded the PDSA Gold Medal, the highest award for outstanding bravery and dedication by an assistance dog, for remarkable dedication, tenacity and initiative in saving his owners' life in 2003, when he was only 17 months old.

As a result of this and other achievements, Orca was also the first dog in the county to be officially recognised in 2004 as a "carer" by the City of York council, entitling him to an allowance for equipment and food.

== Orca ==
Orca was born on 13 November 2001, and was partnered with his disabled handler, Cheryl Alexander (née Smith) on 28 March 2003. He was a large dog, weighing approximately 36 kg. Cheryl is a wheelchair user who suffers from the disabling condition reflex sympathetic dystrophy syndrome, a neurological condition that effectively prevents her from walking unaided.

Orca, trained to think for himself, could respond to over 150 commands, including loading and unloading a washing machine, operating an ATM and VCR, opening doors and cupboards, bringing things from the fridge, untying shoelaces, removing gloves, socks, hats, scarves, shoes and jackets, among others. He could also select items from shelves in the supermarket, place them in a basket, and then put the items onto the conveyor. He could take an envelope of money into a shop lacking wheelchair access and return with a newspaper. Orca could recognise around 30 objects by name, such as book, blanket, glove, phone, mobile, post and pole. Orca knew his left from his right, and knew the difference between his left and the handler's left. He could press buttons for lifts, light switches and pedestrian crossings. Cheryl gives as an example an anecdote, that:

"she dropped a £10 note on the floor in the bank. A man tried to pick it up for her, but Orca put a paw on it and refused to move until the man had backed off. Then he picked it up and passed it [to her] himself."

Orca was also capable of complex decision-making. If Cheryl dropped an item that she was unable to reach, Orca would retrieve it without being asked. However, if Orca felt she was able to retrieve the item, he would not interfere. Orca could follow strings of commands, up to a maximum of five at a time. For example, if asked to retrieve a book from a table, he could be given the command string; 'Out; up table; get the book; bring it here.'

After the birth of Cheryl's daughter, Orca also learned to fetch nappies, baby wipes, and a changing mat. He could help with dressing the baby. This led to further fame for the Canine Partner.

Orca retired on 12 November 2013, the day before his twelfth birthday. He died on 5 November 2014, 8 days before his thirteenth birthday.

== Incident of May 2003 ==
On 18 May 2003, after they had been partnered for two months and Orca was 17 months old and only just out of training, Cheryl's powered wheelchair struck an obstruction on a country footpath near Heslington, pitching her some 12 – 20 feet (3 – 5 metres) down an embankment into a drainage ditch. The lower part of the ditch was water-filled to between a foot and waist level, and Cheryl became trapped in the water with the full weight of the 300 lb wheelchair pinning her across her legs. By chance, it had landed in a manner that did not crush her, however it held her trapped in the water, with her head facing downwards and her legs pressed into the thick mud at the bottom.

Orca sought to descend to help her, but after 5 minutes was finally persuaded to leave and seek help. It began to rain very heavily, a risk given that Cheryl was in a drainage ditch. A long time later he returned to Cheryl, but he was still alone.

It later transpired that he had found a passer-by, but the person approached had not realised Orca was an assistance dog seeking help in an emergency, and had tried to lead the dog home by his collar, to report him as a stray. Assistance dogs are trained to follow humans, and Orca had evidently reached the exceptional understanding that this person was not going to follow him or provide help, and that this was accordingly an occasion to break the rule. Orca had had to pull out of his collar and avoid being led, to do this – an act which goes against all normal assistance dog training.

Having checked on Cheryl, Orca left her to search for help a second time.

By this time it was "pouring with rain" and the weather had deteriorated to the point of hail, placing her at risk of drowning or hypothermia. It took Orca around two more hours, and much perseverance, to find help, and considerable initiative to persuade the man to follow him for the entire mile-long walk back to the ditch. The person he found was a passing jogger, one of Cheryl's neighbours, until then unknown to her. Cheryl was already suffering hypothermia and drifting in and out of consciousness, when they finally arrived.

Cheryl was rescued and treated in hospital for hypothermia. The rescue services considered that Orca's "remarkable skills and unstinting devotion" had without question saved her life. The ditch was remote, the weather very bad – both cold and raining – and the path not commonly walked.

== Awards and recognition ==
In July 2004 Orca became one of the first assistance dogs in the country to be paid an allowance as if he were a human assistant. In 2006 he was awarded the PDSA Gold Medal, the highest award for a non-military dog and the animal equivalent of the George Cross. Orca has been on television many times, including Test Your Pet, Dogs with Jobs and Sunday Style.

== See also ==
- List of individual dogs
