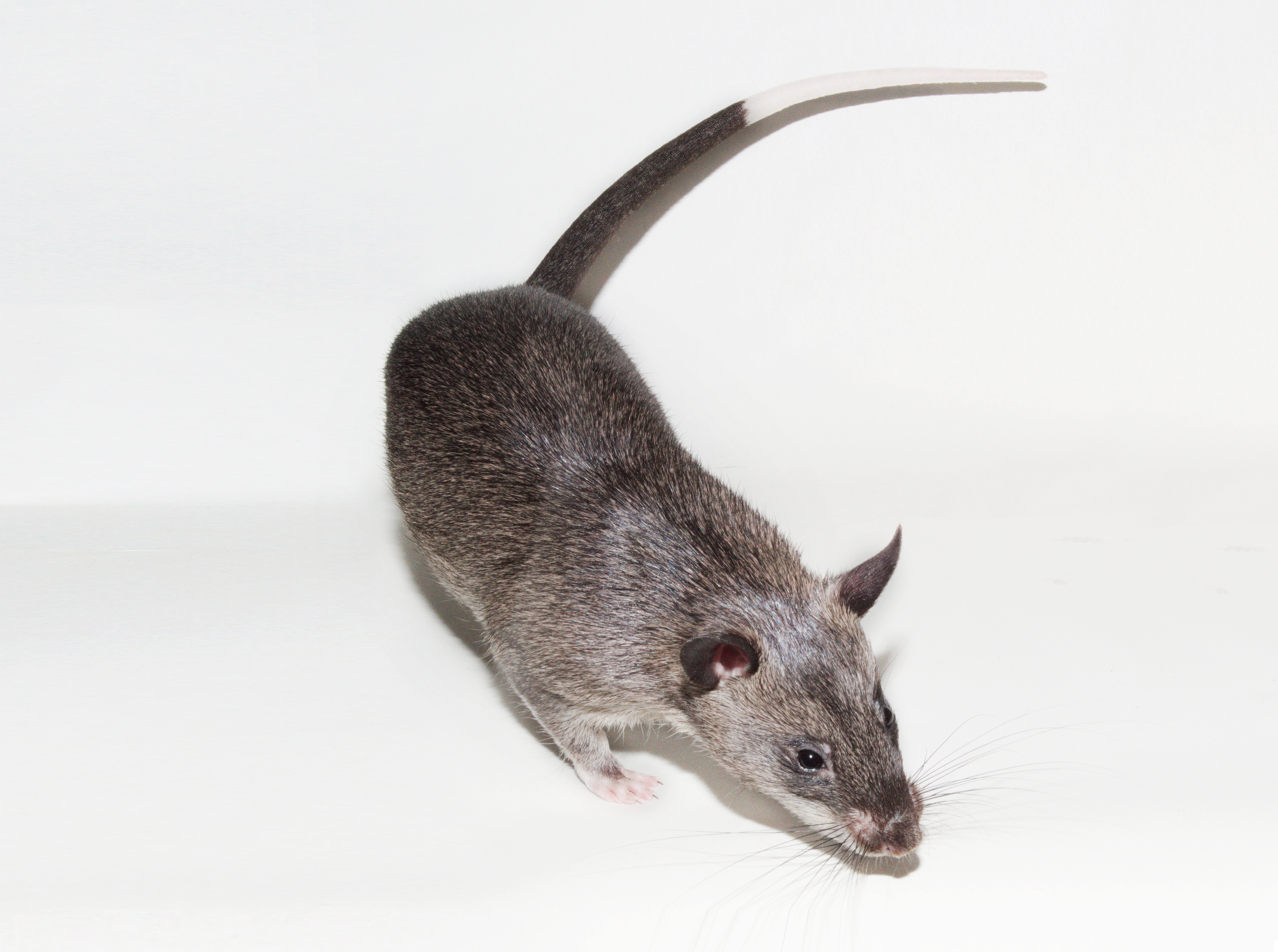
- A captive pet

Conservation status
- Least Concern (IUCN 3.1)

Scientific classification
- Kingdom: Animalia
- Phylum: Chordata
- Class: Mammalia
- Order: Rodentia
- Family: Nesomyidae
- Genus: Cricetomys
- Species: C. gambianus

Binomial name
- Cricetomys gambianus Waterhouse, 1840

= Gambian pouched rat =

Species of rodent

The Gambian pouched rat (Cricetomys gambianus), also commonly known as the African giant pouched rat, is a species of nocturnal pouched rat of the giant pouched rat genus Cricetomys, in the family Nesomyidae. It is among the largest muroids in the world, growing to about 0.9 m (3 ft) long, including the tail, which makes up half of its total length. It is widespread in sub-Saharan Africa, ranging from Senegal to Kenya and from Angola to Mozambique (although it is absent from much of the Democratic Republic of the Congo, where Emin's pouched rat is present) from sea level to 2,000 m (6,600 ft). There are also some secluded populations in the south Zimbabwe and in South Africa.

The Gambian pouched rat is sometimes kept as a pet, but some have escaped from captivity and become an invasive species in Florida. In the United States, the Centers for Disease Control and Prevention (CDC) and the Food and Drug Administration (FDA) now ban the importation of this species because it is blamed for the 2003 outbreak of monkeypox.

== Characteristics ==
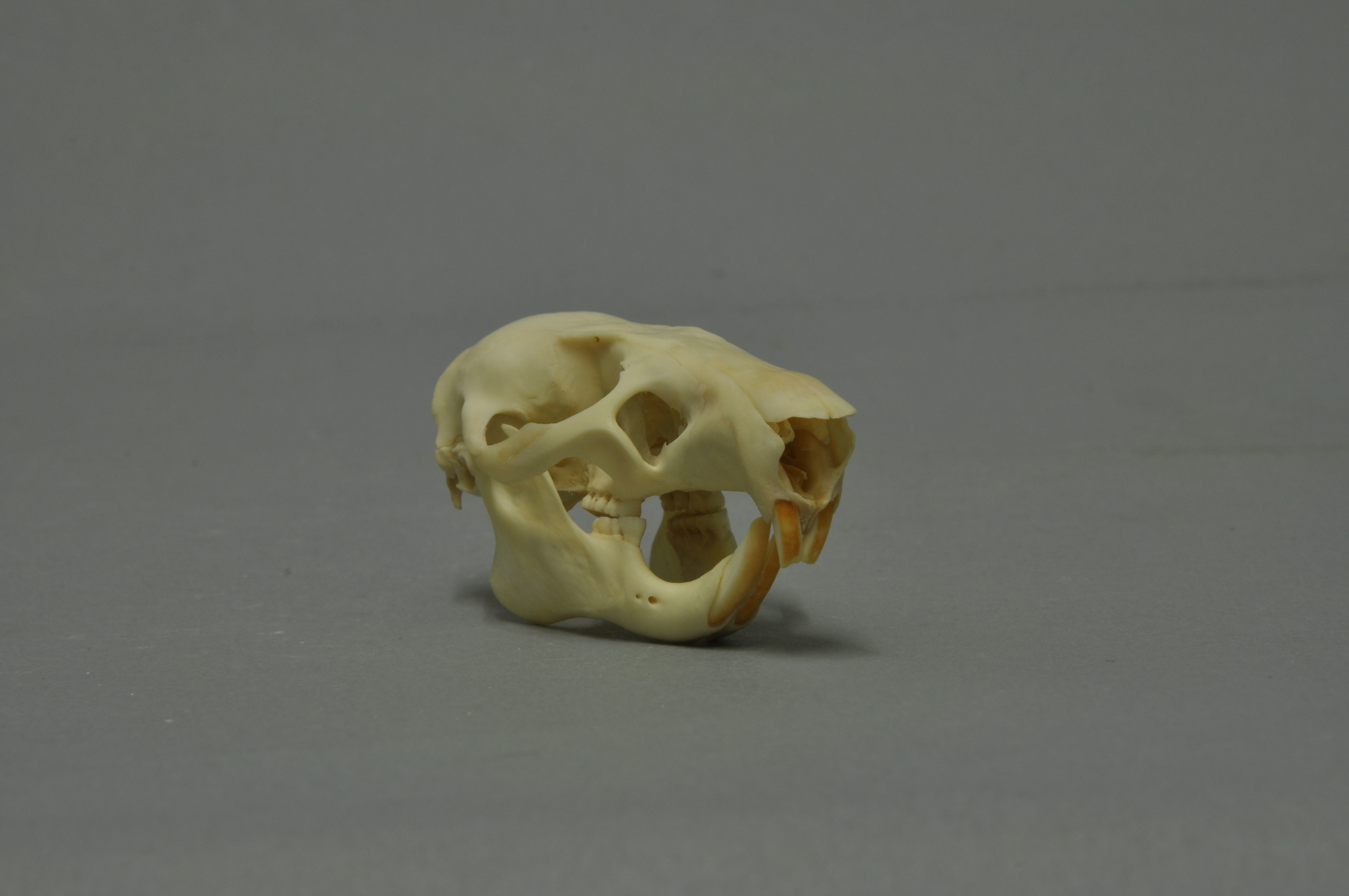
Skull of a Gambian pouched rat

The Gambian pouched rat has very poor eyesight, so it depends on its senses of smell and hearing. Its name comes from the large, hamster-like pouches in its cheeks. One of its main identifiable traits is a dark ring around the eyes. It is not a true rat, but is part of an African branch of muroid rodents. It typically weighs between 1.0 and 1.4 kg (2.2 and 3.1 lb). In its native Africa, the pouched rat lives in colonies of up to 20, usually in forests and thickets, but also commonly in termite mounds. In rare cases they are found in urban areas. It is omnivorous, feeding on vegetables, insects, crabs, snails, and other items, but apparently prefers palm fruits and palm kernels.

Its cheek pouches allow it to gather up several kilograms of nuts per night for storage underground. It has been known to stuff its pouches so full of date palm nuts so as to be hardly able to squeeze through the entrance of its burrow. It is also noted that burrows are closed from the inside when they occupy it. The burrow consists of a long passage with side alleys and several chambers, one for sleeping and the others for storage. The Gambian pouched rat reaches sexual maturity at 5–7 months of age. It has up to four litters every nine months, with up to six offspring in each litter. Males are territorial and tend to be aggressive when they encounter one another.

== Detection of land mines by scent ==
A Tanzanian social enterprise founded by two Belgians, APOPO ("Anti-Personnel Landmines Removal Product Development" in English), trains the closely related southern giant pouched rats (Cricetomys ansorgei) to detect land mines and tuberculosis with their highly developed sense of smell. The trained pouched rats are called HeroRATS. The rats are far cheaper to train than mine-detecting dogs; a rat requires US$7,300 for nine months of training, whereas a dog costs about $25,000 for training, but lives about twice as long.

In 2020, a Hero Rat named Magawa (2013–2022) received a People's Dispensary for Sick Animals Gold Medal, the animal equivalent of the George Cross, becoming the first rat to receive the award since the charity began honouring animals in 2003. Before retiring in 2021, Magawa detected 71 landmines and 38 items of unexploded ordnance, clearing over 2,421,880 sq ft (225,000 m^{2}) of land in Cambodia, preventing many injuries and deaths, in his 5-year career. Magawa died from natural causes at the age of 8 in 2022. A new record of over 100 landmine detections was set in 2025 by a rat named Ronin.

== Detection of tuberculosis by scent ==
The Gambian pouched rat has been used in experiments at Cornell University to investigate its usefulness in the detection of tuberculosis in human sputum samples. Reports that they are also being used in Mozambique and Tanzania to check tuberculosis test results have proven mildly incorrect: Genetic testing by Watkins shows APOPO's workers are C. ansorgei.

== As an invasive species ==
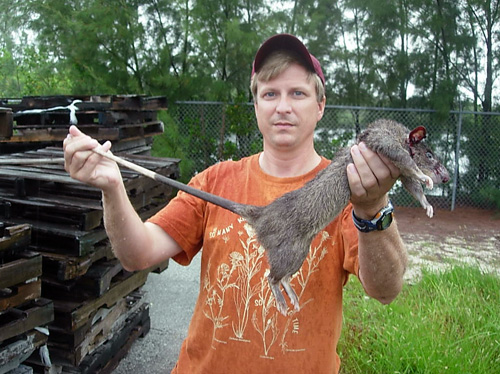
A Gambian pouched rat killed in the Florida Keys

Gambian pouched rats have become an invasive species on Grassy Key in the Florida Keys, after a private breeder allowed the animals to escape in the 1990s. Starting in 2007, Florida wildlife officials have tried to eradicate it from Grassy Key, but it was still present as of 2014, and has been sighted nearby on Key Largo and in Marathon, Florida.

This outsized African rodent is also believed to be responsible for the 2003 Midwest monkeypox outbreak in the United States, after spreading it to prairie dogs that were purchased as pets. In 2003, the CDC and FDA issued an order preventing the importation of the rodents following the first reported outbreak of mpox. Around 71 individuals were affected.
