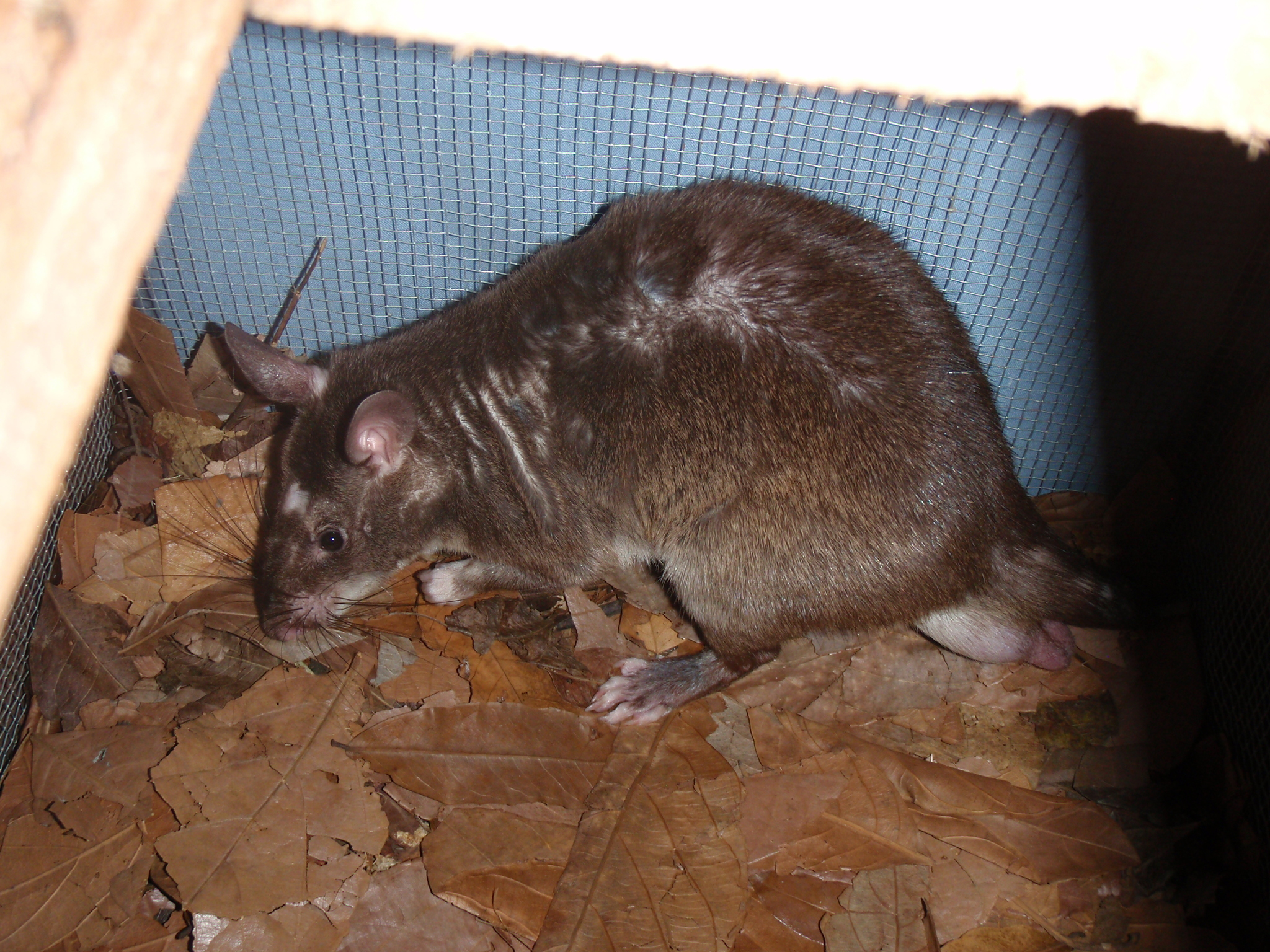

Conservation status
- Least Concern (IUCN 3.1)

Scientific classification
- Kingdom: Animalia
- Phylum: Chordata
- Class: Mammalia
- Order: Rodentia
- Family: Nesomyidae
- Genus: Cricetomys
- Species: C. ansorgei

Binomial name
- Cricetomys ansorgei Thomas, 1904
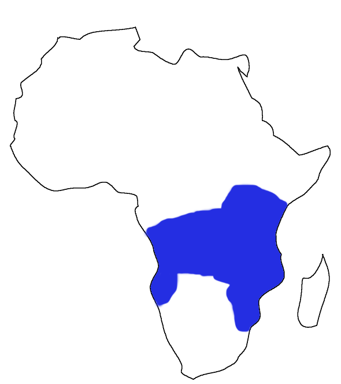

Synonyms
- List: Cricetomys gambianus viator O. Thomas, 1904; Cricetomys gambianus adventor O. Thomas & Wroughton, 1907; Cricetomys gambianus cunctator O. Thomas & Wroughton, 1908; Cricetomys gambianus elgonis O. Thomas, 1910; Cricetomys gambianus kenyensis Osgood, 1910; Cricetomys luteus Dollman, 1911; Cricetomys gambianus enguvi E. Heller, 1912; Cricetomys gambianus osgoodi E. Heller, 1912; Cricetomys gambianus raineyi E. Heller, 1912; Cricetomys microtis Lönnberg, 1917; Cricetomys cosensi Hinton, 1919; Cricetomys gambianus haagneri A. Roberts, 1926; Cricetomys emini vaughan-jonesi St. Leger, 1937; Cricetomys emini ansorgei G. M. Allen, 1939; Cricetomys gambianus ansorgei Ellerman, 1941; Cricetomys gambianus cosensi Ellerman, 1941; Cricetomys gambianus microtis Ellerman, 1941; Cricetomys gambianus selindensis A. Roberts, 1946; Cricetomys ansorgei ansorgei D. E. Wilson, Mittermeier, & Lacher, 2017

= Southern giant pouched rat =

African species of rodent

The southern giant pouched rat (Cricetomys ansorgei) is a species of rodent in the family Nesomyidae. It is distributed in the savannah of East and Southern Africa.

== Description ==
The southern giant pouched rat is a large rodent, with males larger than females. Adult males typically weigh 1.5 to 2.0 kg (3.3 to 4.4 lb), while females weigh 1.2 to 1.6 kg (2.6 to 3.5 lb). The pouches for which these rats are named consist of oversized cheek-pouches, which they often use to transport large food-finds back to their burrows for storage. From their nose to the tip of their tail, these animals are approximately 70 to 80 cm (28 to 31 in) long. They have dark brown to reddish fur on their backs and a pale belly. The tail is bi-colored, brown with white at the distal third of the tail.

Females have small litters, usually between 1–3 young at a time. Males scent mark using cheek and anogenital rubbing, as well as urine, and appear to preferentially mark unfamiliar locations.

== Taxonomy ==
An analysis of cranial head measurements, as well as mitochondrial cytochrome b phylogeny shows C. ansorgei to be distinct from other members of the genus Cricetomys. C. ansorgei may have a largely-undescribed sister species that resides west of the Congo River. Previously, many animals described as Cricetomys gambianus may have instead been C. ansorgei based on this new characterization.

== Distribution ==
The southern giant pouched rat is widely distributed in mainly tropical regions of southern Africa, notably Zimbabwe, Kenya, Tanzania, Zambia, and the Democratic Republic of Congo.

== Use by humans ==
The southern African giant pouched rat is used in tuberculosis detection and in locating landmines through initiatives by APOPO. It is also popular as bushmeat, though they are known to harbor various endoparasites.
