= PDSA Gold Medal =

Bravery award to animals

- The PDSA Gold Medal
- Awarded for: Animal gallantry and devotion to duty
- Country: United Kingdom
- Presented by: People's Dispensary for Sick Animals
- First award: 2002
- Website: PDSA Gold Medal
- PDSA Gold Medal service ribbon

The PDSA Gold Medal is an animal bravery award that acknowledges the bravery and devotion to duty of animals. It was created by the People's Dispensary for Sick Animals (PDSA) in 2001, and is now recognised as the animal equivalent of the George Cross. The Gold Medal is considered as the civilian equivalent to PDSA's Dickin Medal for military animals. An animal can be awarded the PDSA Gold Medal if it assists in saving human or non-human life when its own life is in danger or through exceptional devotion to duty. The medal can also be awarded to animals in public service, such as police or rescue dogs, if the animal dies or suffers serious injury while carrying out its official duties in the face of armed and violent opposition.

The first ceremony, in November 2002, saw the Gold medal awarded to three dogs, including Endal, an assistance dog whose actions helped to save the life of his disabled owner. As of September 2023, the PDSA Gold Medal has been awarded to 31 different animals. All recipients were dogs until 2020, when a mine-sniffing African giant pouched rat named Magawa received the prize. The majority of recipients have been British. Non-British recipients include Bamse, who was Norwegian, George and Gage, both from New Zealand, Ajax, who was Spanish, and Magawa, who was Tanzanian.

== Recipients ==
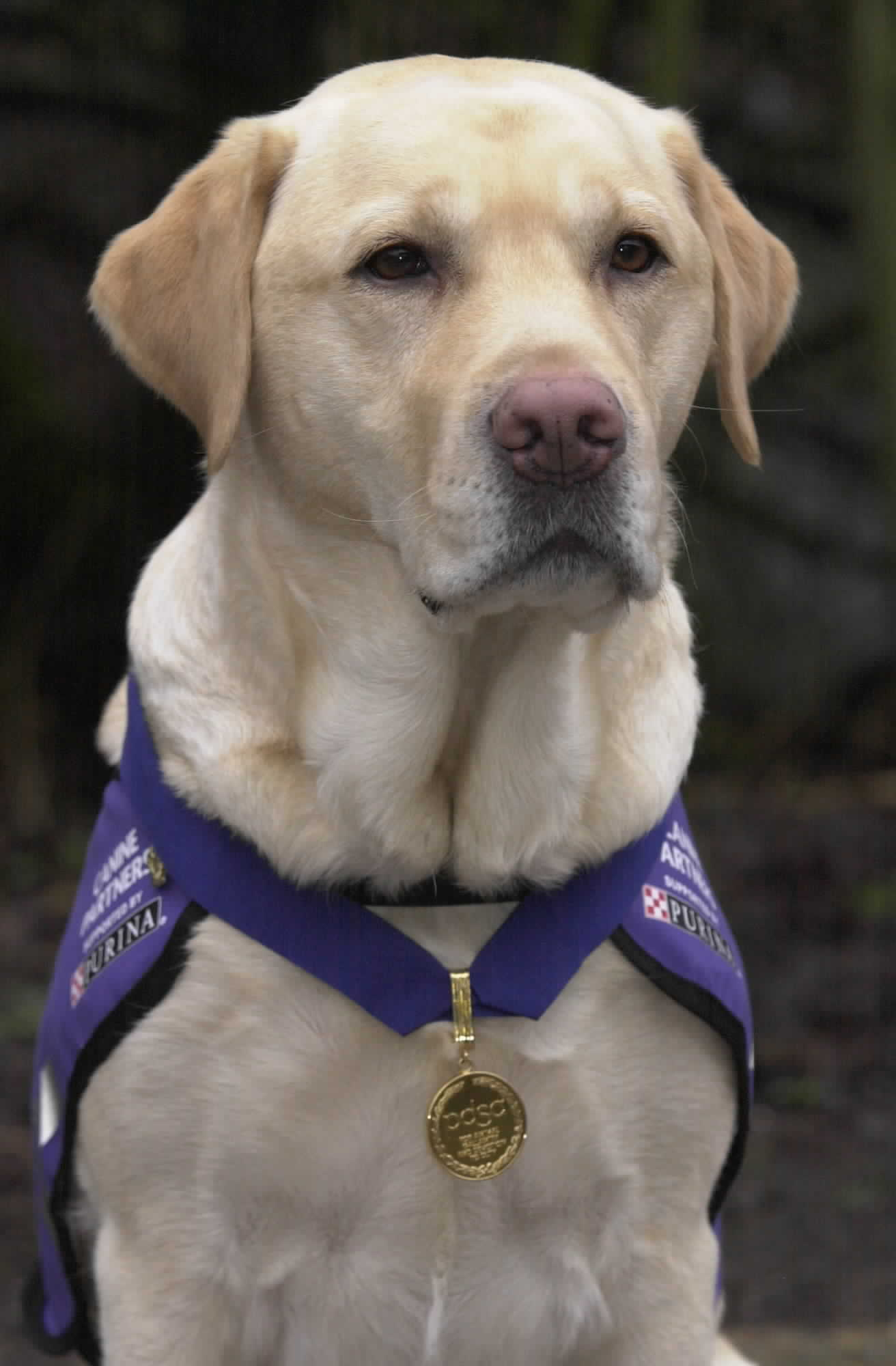
Endal received the gold medal in 2002.

*Awarded posthumously

Date of award	Recipient	Notes	Date of incident	Ref.
November 2002*	Bulla	A police dog who was killed in 1990 after being stabbed while apprehending a man brandishing a knife.	May 1990	
November 2002	Metpol Delta Monty	Otherwise known as Monty, a police dog who overpowered a man wielding a knife despite being stabbed several times.	February 2001	
November 2002	Endal	A Labrador Retriever service dog who pulled his disabled owner into the recovery position after he was struck unconscious, then covered him with a blanket. He also retrieved his mobile phone and pushed it against his face. Endal only left his owner's side to fetch help once he had regained consciousness.	May 2001	
April 2006	Orca	A Golden Retriever assistance dog who fetched help when his wheelchair-using owner fell into a ditch and was pinned face-down next to the water under her motorised chair. Although the first person he encountered believed he was lost and tried to lead him away, he broke free from his collar and eventually led his owner's neighbour to the scene of the accident.	May 2003	
April 2006	Blue	A German Shepherd police dog, who despite being stabbed while tracking a violent suspect, followed the man to his hideout and assisted in his disarming and arrest.	March 2005	
April 2006	Zoltan	A police dog who was stabbed while attempting to disarm a man who had been threatening members of the public and the police with a knife.	April 2005	
June 2006	Dylan & Cracker	A pair of search-and-rescue dogs from Northern Ireland, the two dogs received their award for their search-and-rescue work including their "exceptionally courageous work" in Turkey following the 1999 İzmit earthquake.	1999	
July 2006*	Bamse	A St. Bernard who was a mascot to the Royal Norwegian Navy minesweeper Thorodd in the Second World War, he knocked a knifeman into the sea, and later saved a crew member from drowning.	1941–1942	
July 2007	Vinnie, Billy & Jake	Vinnie, Billy and Jake, all sniffer dogs, were honoured as representatives of the 14 police dogs who undertook "life-saving work" during the 7 July 2005 London bombings.	July 2005	
December 2007	Ghillie	An English Springer Spaniel who fetched assistance when his owner's mother collapsed while walking him.	December 2007	
February 2009*	George	A Jack Russell Terrier who was killed while shielding a group of children from a pair of attacking Pit Bulls.	April 2007	
July 2009	Bosnich	A pet black Labrador Retriever who led rescuers to his owner's 73-year-old father who had gone missing on the Cumbrian Fells.	August 2006	
July 2010	Anya	A police dog who suffered stab wounds to the chest while protecting her handler.	January 2008	
July 2010	Frodo	A five-year-old Beagle who woke his owner and led the family to safety when smoke detectors failed to go off during a house fire.	June 2008	
July 2010*	Oi	A Staffordshire Bull Terrier who saved her owners' lives by fighting off a gang of four machete-wielding assailants. Oi died from cancer before the award was made.	July 2008	
April 2011	Dexter	For displaying outstanding gallantry, despite serious injuries, while carrying out official duties in the face of violent opposition.		
October 2012	Ellie and Jones	German Shepherd crosses who saved the life of their owner	November 2010	
June 2013	Ajax	German Shepherd awarded for "lifesaving bravery and courageous devotion to duty in the face of extreme danger.”	July 2009	
August 2013*	Gage	A German Shepherd police dog who suffered a fatal gunshot wound while protecting his injured handler during a routine drugs search.	July 2010	
January 2016	K9 Killer	A Belgian Malinois dog who worked with the Kruger National Park's Special Operations Team to prevent rhinoceros poachers in South Africa.	Since 2012	
February 2017	Ozzy	A police dog in Falkirk, Scotland who disarmed a knife-wielding man threatening to blow up a block of flats.	2015	
June 2017	Diesel	A pet Staffordshire Bull Terrier who saved his family in a house fire.	28 May 2016	
April 2018	Teddy	A Cockapoo who alerted to a child in a tumble dryer, saving him from potentially fatal injuries.	13 November 2016	
May 2018	Finn	A German Shepherd police dog who was badly knifed in an incident during a police chase in Hertfordshire, afterwards together with his owner campaigned to change to the law to give better protection to injured working animals.	October 2016	
July 2019	Bacca	A police dog with West Mercia Police who received eight stab wounds in an incident in Bromyard.	6 June 2018	
September 2020	Magawa	A Gambian pouched rat detecting unexploded ordnance in Cambodia. Magawa discovered many land mines and other items of ordnance left over from the Cambodian Civil War. He was trained by APOPO.	c.2013–2021	
September 2023	Kaiser	A German Shepherd police dog who sustained serious stab wounds in an incident near Downe Village.	30 May 2021	

== See also ==
- The Dickin Medal, a separate award also administered by the PDSA, which was established by Maria Dickin, founder of the PDSA, in 1943, to acknowledge acts of outstanding bravery by animals serving with military forces in theatres of war, and is considered the animal equivalent of the Victoria Cross.
- Swansea Jack (1930–1937), twice decorated by the National Canine Defence League before the introduction of the PDSA Gold Medal
