= George (dog) =

New Zealand dog recognised for bravery (died 2007)

- Species: Canis familiaris
- Breed: Jack Russell Terrier
- Sex: Male
- Died: 29 April 2007; Manaia, Taranaki, New Zealand
- Cause of death: Dog attack
- Owner: Alan Gay
- Residence: Manaia, Taranaki, New Zealand
- Height: 30 cm (12 in)
- Awards: RNZSPCA Bravery Medal; PDSA Gold Medal

George (died 29 April 2007) was a pet dog in Taranaki, New Zealand, who was credited with sacrificing his life to save local children from a dog attack. George's heroism was internationally recognised, and he received posthumous awards from New Zealand and British animal charities.

== Biography ==
A 30-centimetre-tall (12 in) Jack Russell Terrier with "a heart condition", George lived in Manaia, Taranaki, New Zealand with his owner, widower Alan Gay. The Sydney Morning Herald reported George was born in 1997/1998, while The Stratford Press and Sky News reported it was 1992/1993. George previously lived with Gay's neighbours, but they offered the dog to Gay when they moved away because "the dog spent so much time at his place."

== Defensive action ==
The Sydney Morning Herald and The New Zealand Herald reported that on 29 April 2007, five children in Manaia were walking home when they were attacked by two pit bulls. Nine-year-old (born 1997/1998) George defended the children, but was severely injured by the melee. Gay's veterinarian recommended euthanising George, and while Gay reluctantly agreed with the course of action, he later came to regret the decision. The pit bulls were also euthanised, and their owner "[faced] prosecution for owning dangerous and uncontrolled dogs." Six months later, the Stratford Press reported that it had been one pit bull versus a 14-year-old George protecting three children. In February 2009, Sky News reported that George had been 14 years old when he faced off two pit bulls to defend five children aged 3–12.

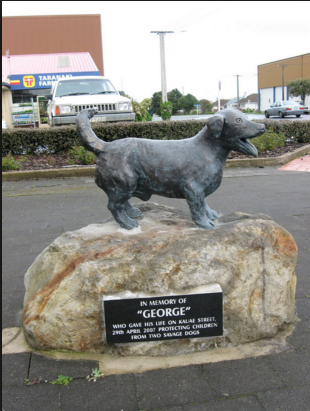
The statue of George in Manaia

In the aftermath, George was praised and memorialised for his bravery and sacrifice. The Royal New Zealand Society for the Prevention of Cruelty to Animals awarded him a medal for bravery, the first awarded to a dog in 17 years, and the first non-police dog to ever receive it; Gay was to receive George's medal at the children's school. Jerrell Hudman, a United States Marine Corps veteran of the Vietnam War, was so impressed by George's actions, he told the Taranaki Herald that he would send Gay one of his three Purple Hearts. In spring 2007, a bronze statue of George was unveiled in Manaia, the work of New Plymouth's Fridtjof Hanson. In 2009, the British People's Dispensary for Sick Animals awarded George the PDSA Gold Medal, a decoration Sky News described as "the animal equivalent of the George Cross"; the medal was hung about the neck of George's statue by Anand Satyanand, then-Governor-General of New Zealand.

== See also ==
- List of individual dogs
