= APOPO =

NGO that trains landmine- and tuberculosis-sniffing rats

- Anti-Personnel Landmines Detection Product Development
- Anti-Persoonsmijnen Ontmijnende Product Ontwikkeling
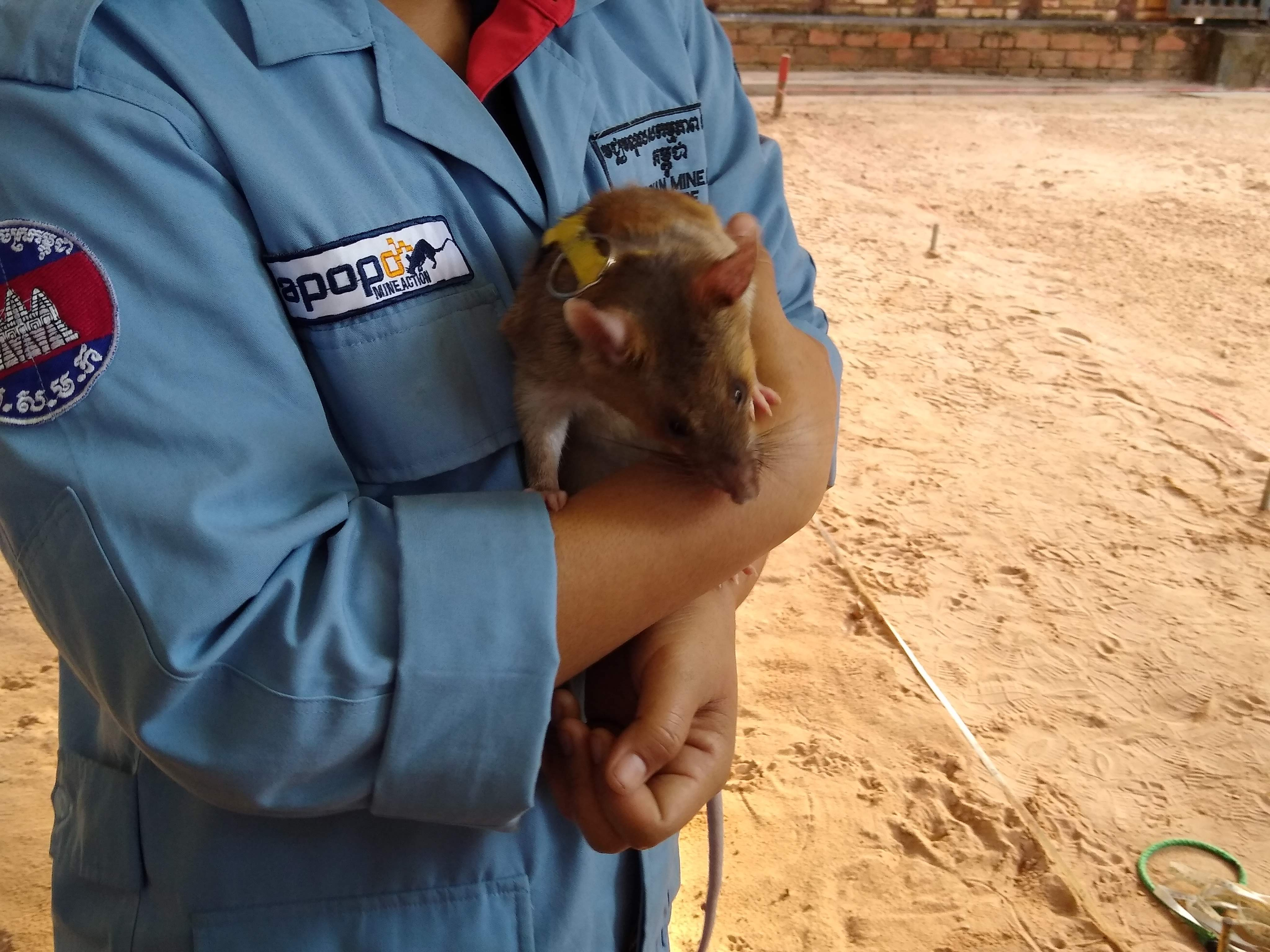
- One of APOPO's "HeroRATs" in Cambodia
- Formation: 1997
- Type: Non-governmental organization
- Purpose: To develop detection rats technology to provide solutions for global problems and inspire positive social change.
- Headquarters: Morogoro, Tanzania
- Region served: Africa, Asia, South America
- Fields: Mine action, tuberculosis, research and development, disaster relief
- Website: www.apopo.org

APOPO (Dutch: Anti-Persoonsmijnen Ontmijnende Product Ontwikkeling, lit. 'Anti-Personnel Landmines Detection Product Development') is a registered Belgian non-governmental organisation and US non-profit which trains southern giant pouched rats and technical survey dogs to detect landmines and tuberculosis. They call their trained animals HeroRATs and HeroDOGs.

== Introduction ==
The HeroRATs and HeroDOGs at APOPO are used for humanitarian tasks, specifically detecting landmines, tuberculosis, and conducting search and rescue. The HeroRATs and HeroDOGs can be used in complementary roles to increase efficiency in the field. The HeroRATs usually work in cleared open areas where they can be easily monitored, while the HeroDOGs can work in areas with thick, overgrown vegetation that are harder for rats to navigate. Both rats and dogs use clicker training, a reward-based system that ensures high motivation by reinforcing successful detection with treats. Throughout their careers and into their retirement, they receive excellent care, veterinary support, and specialized handling to ensure their well-being. This introduction section points out how APOPO uses the unique HeroRATs and HeroDOGs in their program to create a more effective humanitarian toolset. By using reward-based training and superior guidelines in animal welfare, the program guarantees these animals are both highly motivated to do their jobs and well-cared for during their life-saving work.

== History ==
APOPO started as an R&D organization in Belgium in the 1990s, working with the support of research and government grants to develop the concept of Detection Rats Technology. As a pet owner, Bart Weetjens, one of the co-founders, came across an article about gerbils being used as scent detectors. He believed that rats, with their strong sense of smell and ability to be trained, could provide a better means to detect landmines. Weetjens's former university lecturer Prof. Mic Billet, the founder of the Institute for Product Development at Antwerp University, fully supported the idea and made his personal resources available for further investigation and promotion of the new initiative. After consulting with Professor Ron Verhagen, rodent expert at the department of evolutionary biology of the University of Antwerp, the Gambian pouched rat was determined to be the best candidate due to its longevity and African origin. The APOPO project was launched on 1 November 1997 by Bart Weetjens and his former schoolmate Christophe Cox. Both Weetjens and Cox had previously collaborated in a not-for-profit organisation that had been headed by Prof. Mic Billet, and together they started building a kennel facility for the training and breeding of African giant pouched rats. They contacted the Sokoine University of Agriculture (SUA) in Morogoro, Tanzania, and placed an order for the import of Gambian pouched rats.

Initial financial support came in 1997 from Belgian government foreign development aid funds. In 2000 it moved its training and headquarters to SUA, partnering with the Tanzanian People's Defence Force.

In 2003 APOPO was awarded a grant from the World Bank, which provided seed funding to research another application of the rats: tuberculosis (TB) detection at SUA. Weetjens got a three-year personal grant from Ashoka: Innovators for the Public in 2007. A TB detection program in Tanzania was launched in mid-2007 as a partnership with four government clinics. In 2008 proof of principle was provided in using trained rats to detect pulmonary tuberculosis in human sputum samples. In 2010 a research plan to evaluate the effectiveness and implementation of the rats in diagnosing tuberculosis was started. The same year APOPO developed an automated training cage in order to remove human bias. The rats' response is measured by optical sensors and the cage produces an automated click sound with food delivery.

In 2010, APOPO developed an automated training cage to make learning faster for the rats. This training cage uses optical sensors to track the rat's movements and measure how they respond to certain scents. By using an automated click sound and food reward, the cage removes human bias from the training process, which helps the rats learn scent detection more precisely . By 2017, they opened a visitor center in Cambodia to show the public how the HeroRats work and train in their training cages.

Following results in Tanzania, the TB detection program was replicated in 2013 at a clinic in Maputo, Mozambique, at the veterinary department of the Eduardo Mondlane University. In 2014, in partnership with the Central Tuberculosis Reference Laboratory, the National Institute of Medical Research and the Center for Infectious Disease Research in Zambia, a study undertaken to determine the accuracy of the rats in a population of presumptive TB patients. In 2014 five additional health centres joined the TB detection programme in Maputo. In 2016 APOPO covered almost 100% of all the suspect TB patients who go to clinics in the city, and the TB detection program in Tanzania had expanded to 28 clinics in three areas and processed around 800 samples per week.

After the first 11 rats were given accreditation according to International Mine Action Standards in 2004, beginning in 2006 machinery for ground preparation, manual deminers and the rats assisted with detection in long-running mine clearance operations in Mozambique. Tasked in 2008 as the sole operator to clear Gaza Province, the province was mine-free in 2012, one year ahead of schedule. In 2013 the government allowed APOPO to expand its operations in Maputo, Manica, Sofaka and Tete provinces. Mozambique was officially declared free of all landmines on 17 September 2015. APOPO assisted the government with clearing five provinces. Sixteen rats were maintained in the country at the request of the government in order to carry out residual (mop-up) tasks.

In Angola APOPO has worked for Norwegian People's Aid since 2012. From 2013 to 2015 up to 31 rats assisted demining by heavy machinery and people with metal detectors at two sites, Ngola-Luije in Malanje and in Malele in Zaire Province, bordering the Democratic Republic of Congo. 49 hectares were cleared. The 52 ha (130 acres) Malele site was cleared one year in advance. In 2016 rats assisted clearance at a site in Ndondele Mpasi, Zaire province.

In early 2014 the national Cambodia Mine Action Centre (CMAC) started demining a site, with the help of Norwegian Peoples Aid, using conventional mine clearance methods. Following a six-month acclimatization and training period, 14 out of the 16 rats were accredited by CMAC in November 2015 to be used in mine clearance operations. Two Cambodian handlers spent six months in the training centre in Tanzania. By June 2016 the first minefield was cleared. In 2017 a visitor centre was opened in Siem Reap. In 2018, reports showed major progress in both clearing mines and finding tuberculosis cases in the field. This proves the program works in real-life situations, not just in a research lab.

== Organization ==
APOPO operational headquarters, including the training and research centers, are based at the Sokoine University of Agriculture in Morogoro, Tanzania. APOPO’s mine action teams have operated in eight countries affected by the legacy of conflict and are currently active in Angola, Cambodia and Mozambique. The TB programmes are operational in Tanzania and Mozambique, with offices based in Morogoro, Dar es Salaam and Maputo. It has also two fundraising offices in Switzerland and in the United States, and an administrative support office in Antwerp (Belgium).

An APOPO foundation was established in Geneva in 2015 to support APOPO's global activities with financial resources, networking among mine clearance and tuberculosis stakeholders, and increasing visibility. An office was set up in the United States to better access important institutional donors and public funding. The U.S. office was registered as a 501(c)(3) tax exempt non-profit organization in 2015, which enables public and corporation donations to be tax deductible. In 2014 APOPO set up a TB Scientific Advisory Committee to provide credibility. APOPO also has a research and development centre.

As of May 2024, APOPO employs over 450 staff in local operations and internationally, and has 279 rats and 79 dogs in various stages of breeding, detection training, research, or operations.

== HeroRATS species profile ==
APOPO chooses to use the Gambian pouched rat for many reasons. They act as a highly effective "biosensor." A biosensor is a living thing used to detect chemicals or physical changes. While man-made machines usually have a hard time with technical difficulties or high price costs, these rats offer a more effective solution as they rely on higher accuracy and the use of biological senses that do not require external power or expensive maintenance. According to research, these rats are often more effective than man-made machines for several reasons.

Biological Advantage

This species of rats has very poor eyesight, so they rely on their sense of smell and hearing, which has naturally evolved to find items hidden underground. This makes them better than traditional metal detectors, which often get thrown off by pieces of irrelevant scrap metal. These rats focus only on the scent they were trained to find.To ensure these "biosensors" are reliable, all rats are bred and managed by APOPO at the Morogoro breeding and training centre in Tanzania. This in-house breeding allows the team to begin socialization as early as five weeks old, making the rats comfortable working around their human handlers.

Speed and Efficiency

These rats can clear land faster than other methods. They are the world’s largest rats, their bodies measure 20–35 inches in total length, including a long, nearly hairless tail. Despite being the largest rats though, their relatively small size and weight in comparison to other clearing methods allows them to clear land with a much lower chance of setting off landmines. These nocturnal rodents are highly active, and because they are slim and fast, they provide a cheaper and more productive way to clear landmines in the real world.

Learning Ability

These rats are capable of complex learning. They can be trained to recognize many different scents, from the bacteria in tuberculosis to illegal wildlife parts. Their ability to generalize their thoughts, such as applying what they learned in a lab to a new environment, is a key reason they are successful in the field.

Resilience

Unlike some other animals, these rats are very hardy and can work in difficult tropical climates for many years, making them a long-term solution for humanitarian work.

== HeroDOGS species profile ==
APOPO uses Belgian Shepherds (Malinois) and Dutch Shepherds as their HeroDOGS (Technical Survey Dogs) as part of their landmine detection team. These dogs do not replace the HeroRATS, instead, they work in a complementary role to the HeroRATS and speed up the process of returning safe land to communities, along with doing different tasks as well.

Biological Advantage

Like the rats, HeroDOGS are trained to find the specific scent of explosives such as TNT. This prevents them from being slowed down by distractions like scrap metal, which often confuses traditional metal detectors. By using their natural senses, these dogs can quickly confirm which areas are dangerous and which are safe for people to use again.

Speed and Efficiency

The primary job of HeroDOGS is to perform large-scale scans of land to see if explosives are there. Because they are larger and faster than the HeroRATs, a single dog can clear thousands of square meters in one day. This makes them a much more efficient option for clearing land in the real world than traditional man-made tools.

Learning Ability

HeroDOGS are trained using the same strict scientific methods as the rats. They must pass accreditation tests and are often tested using blind protocols to ensure they are working entirely on their own without help from a handler. This ensures that the detection data provided by the dogs is honest and accurate before human interactions enter the field.

Resilience

APOPO uses a mix of animals to ensure the highest safety standards in difficult environments. HeroDOGS are typically used first to quickly identify general hazardous zones, especially in areas with thick vegetation. Once the dogs have narrowed down the area, HeroRATs are used to find the exact location of the mines because they are light enough to walk safely over them without setting them off, unlike if the heavier dogs were to. The HeroDOGS used by APOPO are mainly Belgian Shepherds (Malinois) and Dutch Shepherds. These specific breeds are chosen because they are highly intelligent, have a strong work ethic, and can stay focused for longer periods of time in difficult environments. Unlike the rats, which are bred by APOPO in Tanzania, the dogs are carefully selected from reputable breeders in Europe and join the program when they are about seven months old. While the rats are motivated by food rewards like bananas and peanuts, the HeroDOGS are typically motivated by play and toys. This high "play drive" is a key trait of the Shepherd breeds that makes them successful as Technical Survey Dogs.

== Scent detection training ==
Full training takes approximately nine months on average, and is followed by a series of accreditation tests. Once trained, rats are able to work for approximately four to five years before they get retired. All of the rats are bred and trained in the Morogoro breeding and training centre. One rat costs approximately 6,000 euros to train.

Training starts with socialization at the age of 5–6 weeks and then through the principles of 'operant conditioning'. After two weeks they learn to associate a "click" sound with a food reward – banana or peanuts. Once they know that "click" means food, the rats are ready to be trained on a target scent. According to the type of specialization, a series of training stages are followed, each one building on skills learned in the previous stage. The complexity of their tasks gradually increases until they have to do a final blind test. Rats that fail the test are retired and are cared for the rest of their life.

== Scientific standards and blind testing ==
A blind test is a key part of the scientific method used by APOPO to ensure the results are honest and accurate. In a blind test, the person handling the rats does not know which samples are "positive" (containing the scent) and which are "negative". This strict scientific standard is also applied to HeroDOGS to ensure that they are finding targets using only their sense of smell without any human influence.

In psychology and animal training, a blind test prevents human bias. If a handler knows where the landmine or tuberculosis sample is, they might accidentally give the rat a slight hint, such as a change in body language or a pull on the leash. By keeping the handler "blind" to the answer, APOPO proves that the rat is finding the scent entirely on its own.

APOPO uses a semi-automated line cage to help rats practice smelling samples without a human handler getting in the way. In the field, rats wear a special harness that is attached to a rope line. When a rat smells a landmine, it stops and scratches the ground. A bell signal or the use of a clicker is then applied to praise the rat and tell them they did a good job and come back for a treat or reward. Using automated cages or blind testing ensures that the rat’s success is based only on its nose, not on clues from a human. This makes the data more reliable for medical and safety use. By using these same high standards for HeroDOGS, APOPO creates a reliable team where animals and humans work together safely to save lives. This scientific approach was praised by Jane Goodall during her 2024 visit, as it ensures that the animals are truly using their specialized senses to save lives.

== Detecting landmines ==
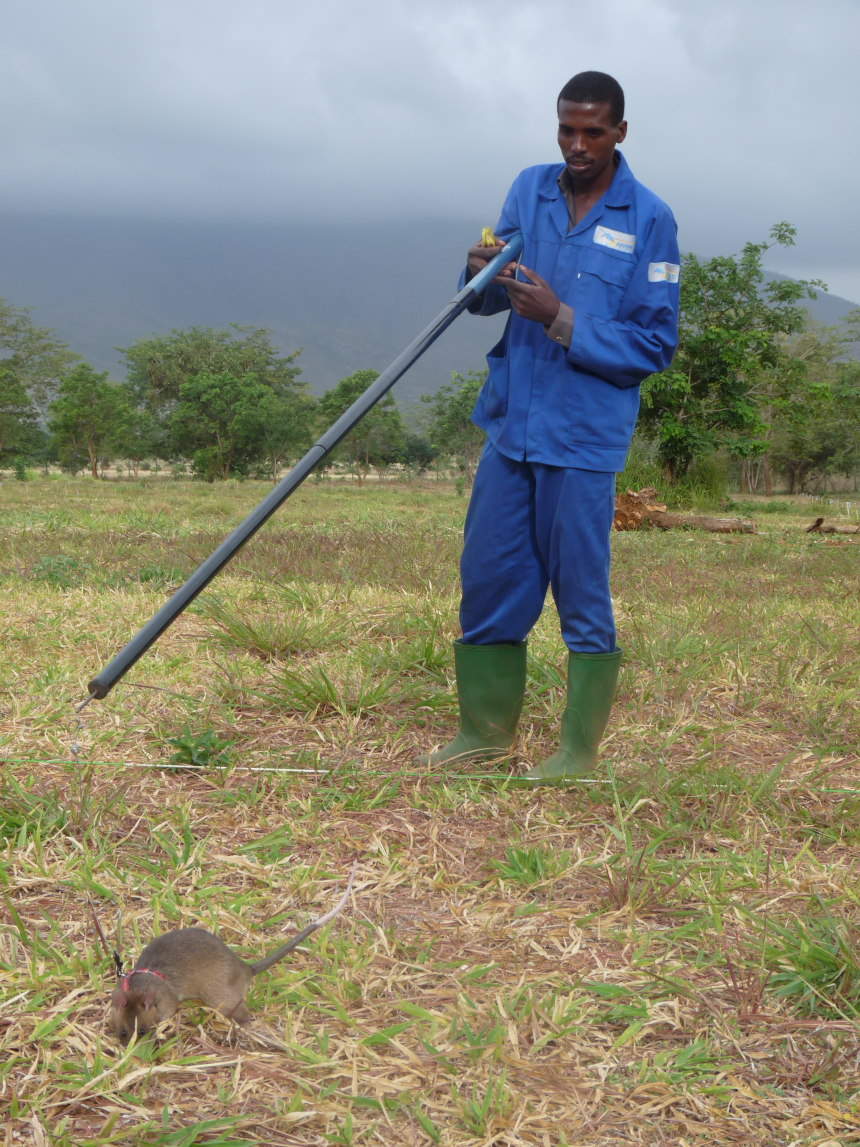
HeroRAT and handler on a landmine training course

When the southern giant pouched rats (Cricetomys ansorgei) used by APOPO are flown in, they must first be acclimatised to the specific country, and be accredited by the local national agency, which takes a number of months.

Rats are only a component of integrated demining operations. Metal detectors and mechanical demining machines are also still necessary. Before the rats can be used, the land must first be prepared with special heavy machinery to cut the brush to ground level. Paths must also be cleared by conventional metal detectors at every 2m intervals for the handlers to safely walk on.

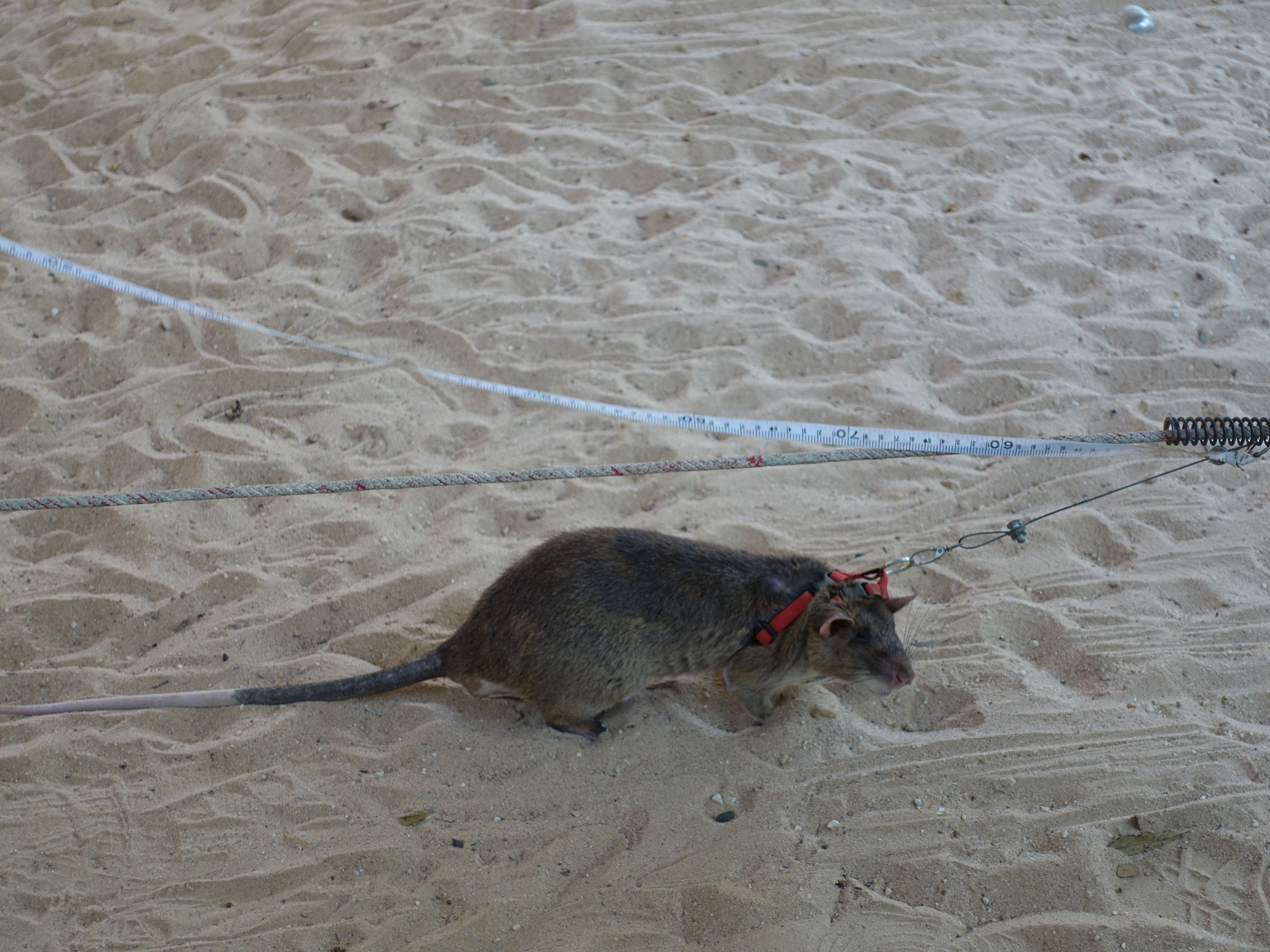
The rats wear harnesses attached to a rope

The rats wear harnesses connected to a rope suspended between two handlers. Rats are led to search a demarcated zone of 10 x 20m (200 m^{2} [2,200 sq ft]) and indicate the scent of explosives usually by scratching at the ground. The points indicated by the rats are marked, and then followed up later by technicians using metal detectors; the mines that are found are then excavated by hand and destroyed.

According to the NGO, the main advantage over conventional methods is speed. They point to past studies that show that less than three percent of landmine-suspected land actually contains any landmines. Animals such as dogs or rats detect only explosives and ignore scrap metal, such as old coins, nuts and bolts, etc., thus they are able to check areas of land faster than conventional methods. They claim that one rat can check 200 m^{2} (2,200 sq ft) in around 20 minutes. In the field, the practical rate is slower: rats are capable of searching up to 400 m^{2} (4,300 sq ft) each per day as part of a team that includes conventional equipment.

The rats are indigenous to Sub-Saharan Africa so are suited to tropical climates and could be resistant to many endemic diseases. Few resources are needed to train and raise a rat to adulthood, and they have a lifespan of six to eight years. Furthermore, rats, unlike dogs, do not form bonds with specific trainers but rather are motivated to work for food, so trained rats can be transferred between handlers. In the minefields, the rats are too light to detonate a pressure-activated mine when walking over it. Their small size also means that they can be more easily transported to sites than dogs.

Rats cannot search reliably in areas of thick vegetation and often search more erratically than humans, offering a lower level of assurance that the land is mine-free. Additionally, they can only work for short periods in the heat, limiting their output. Manual demining teams are still the globally preferred method of landmine clearance, and currently, APOPO is the only organisation in the world to use giant rats.

== Detecting tuberculosis ==
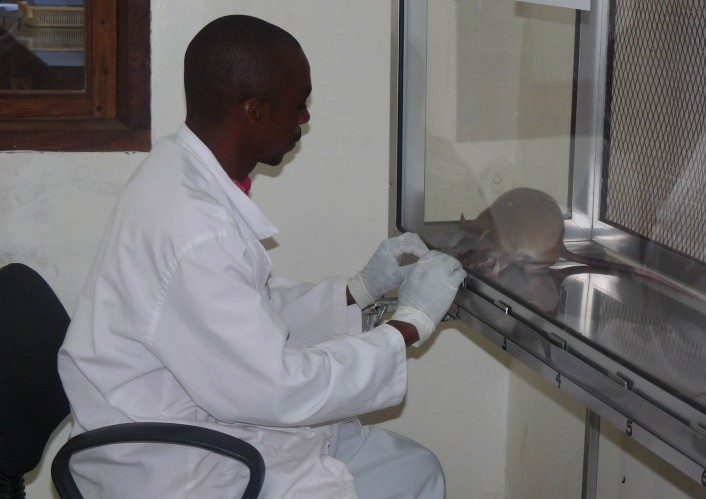
A trained rat analysing sputum samples

Sputum samples that have already been conventionally tested for tuberculosis are retested by the rats. The rats sniff a series of holes in a glass chamber, under which sputum samples are placed. When a rat detects tuberculosis (TB), it indicates this by keeping its nose in the sample hole and/or scratching at the floor of the cage. The program began in Tanzania in 2007, double-checking samples from four government clinics, by 2016 some 1000 samples a week were sent by 24 clinics in and around Dar es Salaam and Morogoro. The rats have been screening samples from clinics in Mozambique since 2013. APOPO have a facility at the Eduardo Mondlane University in Maputo. In 2015 14 health centres in the city worked with it.

The key advantage of the rats is speed. Public clinics use microscopy to detect TB; this is slow and imprecise. In Mozambique only 50% of TB positive patients tested at clinics are actually identified, so the rats are used to double check the samples. According to APOPO, one trained rat can evaluate 40 samples in 7 minutes, which would take a human laboratory technician a day. The rats make it possible to mass-screen many samples. They work at low cost and a fast pace.

APOPO says the use of trained rats increased the detection of TB in patients by over 40%.

In 2015 the rats screened more than 40,000 sputum samples, thereby identifying over 1,150 positive samples that were missed by microscopy.

APOPO assisted Maputo DOTS public health clinics increase TB detection rate by 48% and contributed to halting 3,800 potential TB infections. Of 9,166 presumptive TB patients evaluated by the rats in 2015, 666 missed by conventional methods were diagnosed.

In 2015 APOPO began a study with the support of the USAID, screening prisoners in Tanzanian and Mozambican jails for tuberculosis. This study aimed to convince decision makers of the rats' use.

In 2015 to 2016 more than 2,500 prisoners were to be tested for TB in Mozambique and Tanzania.

== Technology and equipment ==
APOPO uses a semi-automated line cage to help rats practice smelling samples without a human handler getting in the way. Ellis et al. (2019). In the field, rats wear a special harness that is attached to a rope line. When a rat smells a landmine, it stops and scratches the ground. A bell signal or the use of a clicker is then applied to praise the rat and tell them they did a good job, and come back for a treat or reward.

APOPO also use blind testing to make sure handlers do not accidentally influence the rats. In these tests, the handler does not know which samples are positive. This proves the rats are finding the target scents (like TNT or TB) using only their own sense of smell. This method follows strict scientific standards to ensure the program is effective.

== Wildlife detection and conservation ==
A major success of 2023 was the progress that the Wildlife Detection program made. The rats are trained to stop the illegal smuggling of animal parts, helping to protect endangered species across the world.

Detecting Contraband

Rats are trained to sniff out illegal items like pangolin scales or rhino horns being smuggled across borders. This is a very different type of training from landmine detection, but the rats learn it quickly.

Distractions

These rats are capable of finding illegal wildlife parts even when smugglers try to hide the scent with things like coffee or spices. This ability makes them a powerful tool for fighting wildlife crime.

== Search and rescue operations ==
As of 2023, APOPO has made great progress in training "RescueRATs" to help in the aftermath of natural disasters like earthquakes. These rats are now being trained to use advanced technology to communicate with rescuers from deep under debris.

One of the biggest inventions in 2023 is a high-tech, multifunctional backpack designed for the HeroRATS. This backpack includes a video camera, a microphone for two-way speech, and a tracking device. This allows human rescuers to communicate what the rats find in real-time.

Recent training has moved further from simple labs into complex "debris sites" that are set up similar to collapsed buildings. In 2023, the rats proved they could find people even when they were hidden under several layers of rubble. They also learned to stay focused while hearing loud, distracting noises like jackhammers, sirens, and barking dogs.

== Influence of animal psychology ==
The work of APOPO reflects the legacy of primatologist and UN Messenger of Peace, Jane Goodall. Before Goodall’s groundbreaking research, many scientists believed that animals did not have personalities, emotions, or the ability to solve complex problems. Goodall famously gave chimpanzees she studied personal names instead of numbers, which was seen as "unscientific" by traditional psychologists who believed researchers should not bond with their subjects.

APOPO follows a similar psychological path by recognizing the individual traits and personalities of their HeroRATS and HeroDOGS. In July 2024, Dr. Jane Goodall visited the APOPO training center in Tanzania. During her visit, she personally named a HeroRAT "Jane," who is now being trained to detect trafficked wildlife products like pangolin scales illegally in the field. By treating the rats and dogs as partners with unique learning speeds and ensuring they retire to live out their lives in comfort, APOPO applies Goodall's philosophy that animals are sentient beings with a right to respect. This shift in psychology moves animal training away from stern laboratory testing and into a world where human-animal partnerships solve global crises.

== Public engagement and animal monthly adoptions ==
A way APOPO has to support the high cost of training and long-term care, APOPO runs a public “adoption” program. The program allows people to virtually adopt a specific HeroRAT or HeroDOG of their choice to help pay for their food, health checks, and retirement costs. When someone adopts an animal, they receive an official certificate and monthly updates about that animal’s work in the field. This includes updates on famous animals, such as HeroRAT “Jane," who was named by Jane Goodall during her visit to the training center.

This adoption program subscription is an important part of the animals' lives and APOPO’s publicity because it ensures they are treated as partners rather than tools. The money raised helps provide the animals with enrichment, which includes toys and games that keep their minds active when they are not working. By connecting the public directly to the animals, APOPO helps change the way people think about rats and dogs. It shows that with the right training and a strong bond with humans, even small animals can solve big global problems.

== Fundraising ==
APOPO has been funded by the Belgian, Flemish, Norwegian and Liechtenstein governments, the Polish government, the United Nations Development Programme, the National Institutes of Health, USAID, HDIF, the European Union, the Province of Antwerp, the World Bank, the UBS Optimus Foundation, Trafigura Group, JTIF, the Skoll Foundation, Only The Brave Foundation and the lotteries from Sweden, the UK and Holland. It also receives money from private donors and public fundraising campaigns.

== Awards ==
- 2016 : ranked 16th in the Global Geneva Top 500 NGOs.
- 2015 : ranked 24th in the Global Geneva Top 500 NGOs.
- 2013 : ranked 11th on the 'Top 100 NGO's' Global Journal's list. The organization is also featured in the top three lists for the best NGOs in terms of innovation and in the peace-building sector.
- 2013 : received the first level of "C2E" (committed to excellence) accreditation from the EFQM.
- 2020 : Magawa, a giant pouched rat trained by APOPO, received the PDSA Gold Medal for detecting unexploded ordnance in Cambodia.

== See also ==
- Mine clearance agencies
