= List of Labrador Retrievers =

Notable dogs

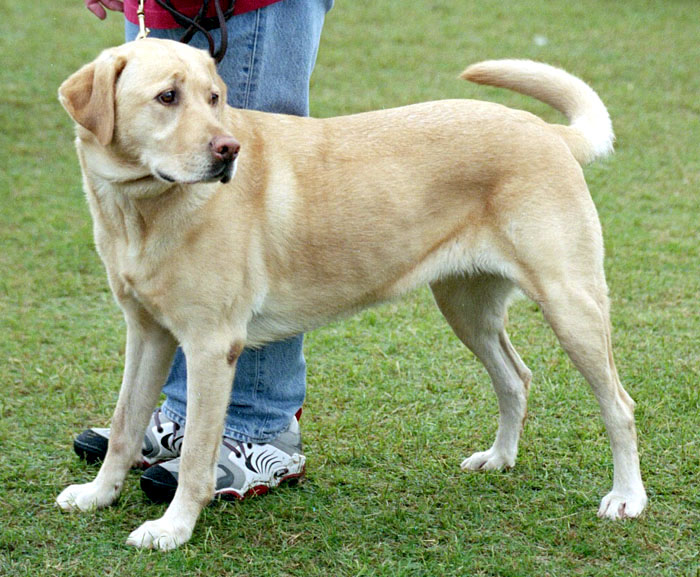
A typical yellow Labrador Retriever

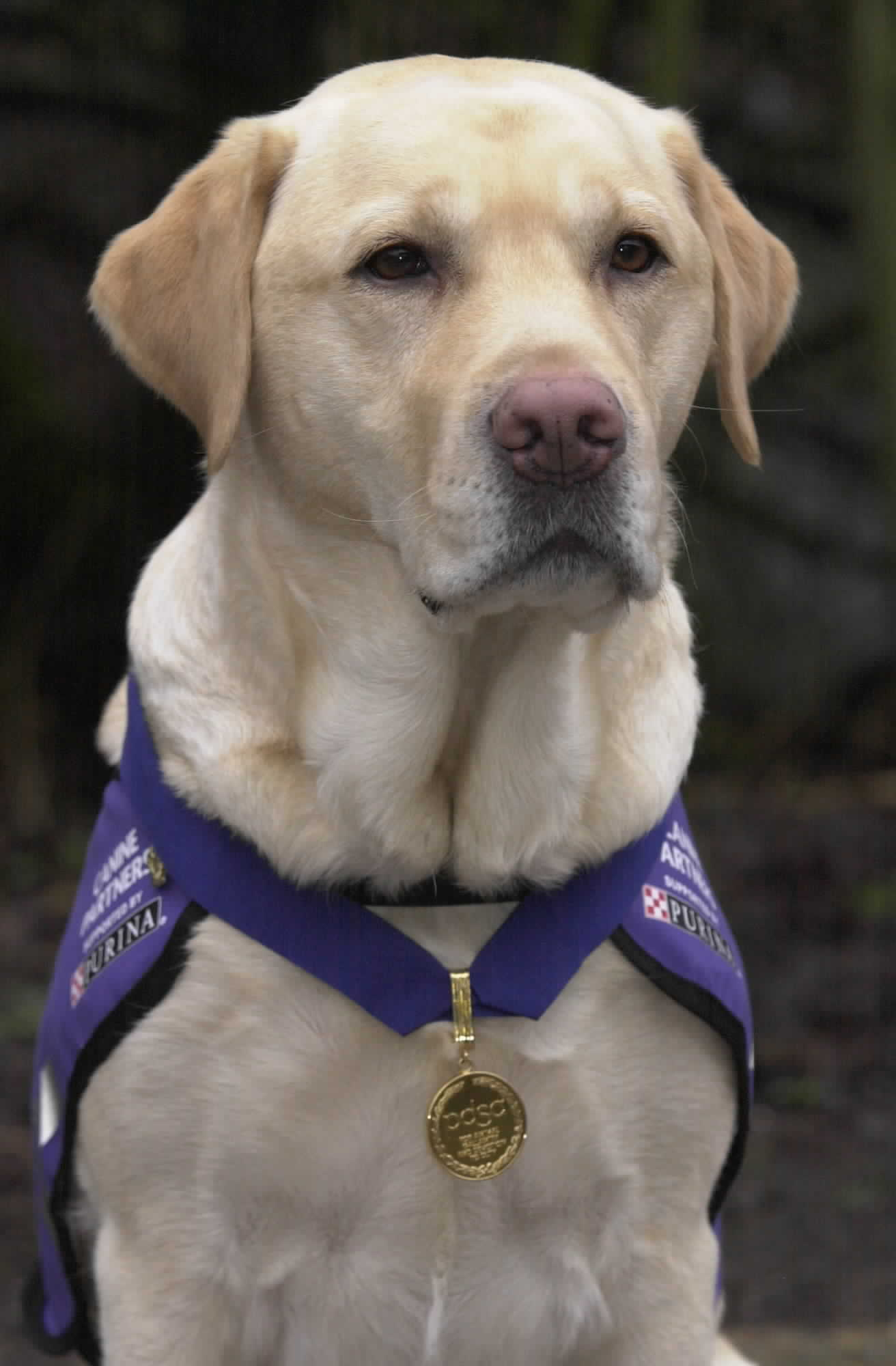
Endal, the world's most decorated dog, wearing his PDSA Gold Medal

This list of Labrador Retrievers covers notable individual dogs that belong to this breed. The Labrador Retriever is the most popular breed of dogs (by registered ownership) in both the United States and the United Kingdom. The breed is exceptionally affable, intelligent, energetic and good natured, making them excellent and popular pets, companions and working dogs. They have a high work ethic. Common working roles for Labradors include: hunting, tracking and detection, disabled-assistance, carting, and therapy work. Approximately 60–70% of all guide dogs in the United States are Labradors.

As both the most popular breed by registered ownership and also the most popular breed for service dogs in several countries, there have been many notable and famous Labradors since the breed was recognized.

== List of famous dogs ==
=== Assistance dogs ===
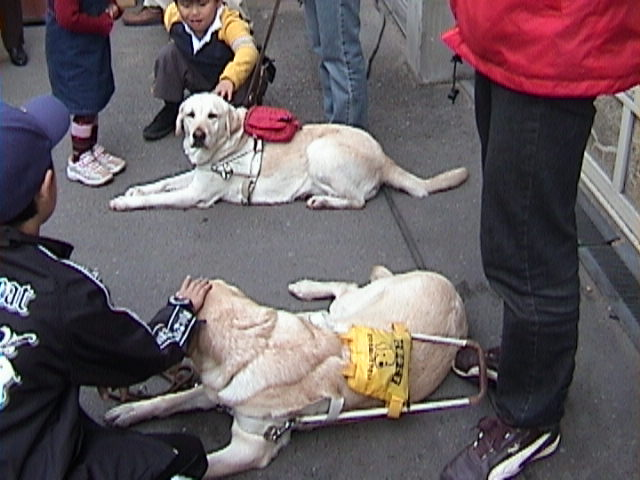
Labrador guide dogs

- Cora, a yellow lab Golden Retriever cross, is a Guide Dog for the Blind in England who holds the Freedom of the City of London. Cora is the first and only Free Dog of the City of London since the recognition ceremony was first recorded in 1237 in the year of King Henry III. The Freedom of the City of London is awarded to people who have achieved success, recognition or celebrity in their chosen field. The recognition of the Freedom of the City of London was unanimously extended to Cora at Guildhall in June 2017 alongside her owner who is a solicitor member of City of London Solicitors Livery Company.
- Endal, a service dog in England. Among other distinctions, "the most decorated dog in the world" (including "Dog of the Millennium" and the PDSA's Gold Medal for Animal Gallantry and Devotion to Duty), the first dog to ride on the London Eye, the first dog known to work a 'chip and pin' ATM card, and the first dog to place a human being in the recovery position without training following a blackout. As of 2007 some three hundred camera crews from several countries have interviewed Endal and his owner/handler, and a film of a year in his life is in production.
- Lucy, David Blunkett's best known guide dog, who once vomited in the British House of Commons during a Parliamentary speech.
- Sully, served with former US President George H. W. Bush during the last six months of his life; noted for his role during the president's funeral.
- Timber, named "Heroic Guide Dog of the Year" by Guide Dogs for the Blind (UK) in 2005, after saving the life of his owner, Arthur Griffiths, during a traffic collision.
- Omar Riviera's yellow Labrador guide dog "Dorado". Riviera was on an upper floor of the Twin Towers at the time of the September 11, 2001 attacks. Despite extreme confusion, noise and panic, Dorado led Riviera down 70 stories just before Tower 1 collapsed. According to media reports, "Riviera even tried to release Dorado so the dog could have a better chance at survival, but found the dog would not leave his side".

=== Police, military, rescue and detection dogs ===
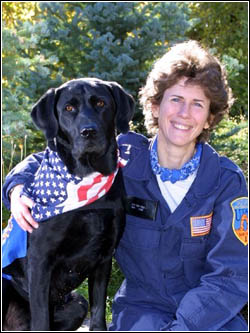
Jake, together with Mary Flood, his handler

- Jake, a black Labrador who became a national canine hero after burrowing through "white-hot, smoking debris" in 2001 during the September 11 attacks in search of survivors at Ground Zero. He helped search for Hurricane Katrina victims in 2005. As a puppy, Jake was abandoned with a broken leg and dislocated hip, but as an adult became one of fewer than 200 U.S. government-certified rescue dogs, and described by a member of the 9/11 Federal search and rescue teams as "a world class rescue dog". He died of cancer at age 12 in July 2007.
- Lucky and Flo, twin Black Labrador counterfeit detection dogs who became famous in 2007 for "sniffing out nearly 2 million unlicensed counterfeit DVDs" for the Motion Picture Association of America while on a 6-month secondment to Malaysia in 2007. The two later repeated a similar feat in several Queens, New York stores. Following the $multi-million 6-arrest Malaysian detection, they became the first dogs to be awarded Malaysia's "outstanding service award", and software pirates were stated to have put a £30,000 contract out for their lives.
- Sabi, an Australian special forces explosives detection dog that spent almost 14 months missing in action (MIA) in Afghanistan before being recovered safe and well in 2009.
- Sadie, a black Labrador who saved the lives of dozens of soldiers in Afghanistan by detecting a bomb. Recipient of the Dickin Medal, the animal equivalent of the Victoria Cross.
- Toppy, name given to seven cloned Labrador retrievers who became the first cloned detection dogs. They were cloned from a Canadian sniffer lab named Chase.
- Zanjeer, a detection dog who detected arms and ammunition used in 1993 Mumbai (Bombay) serial explosions. Zanjeer was born on January 7, 1992, and was inducted into the Bomb Detection and Disposal Squad on December 29, 1992. He was trained at the Dog Training Centre of the Criminal Investigation Department in Pune. During his service, his haul was excellent. He helped recover 57 country-made bombs, 175 petrol bombs, 11 military bombs, 242 grenades and 600 detonators. His biggest contribution to the police force and the city was the detection of 3,329 kg of RDX. He also helped detect 18 Type-56 rifles and five 9mm pistols. He died at a veterinary hospital in Parel.
- Frida, Mexican rescue dog, retired in 2019. Took part in 53 operations in various Central American countries, saving 12 lives and locating 40 bodies. Retirement marked by a ceremony by the Mexican Naval Canine Unit attended by deputy minister Eduardo Redondo, while murals and a bronze statue of her have been created in various places.
- Agata is a female yellow Labrador Retriever drug detection dog who works in Leticia, Colombia. In 2004, Colombian drug barons placed a $10,000 bounty on her head, resulting in the dog and her handler being assigned a bodyguard and her food being monitored for poison. The bounty was the result of her superior skills at drug detection, having stopped more than three hundred kilos of cocaine, worth more than seven million dollars, and twenty kilos of heroin. She was decorated for her work.

=== Other heroic labs ===
- Willie, who saved his friend, John Stenglein, from a wolf attack at a logging camp near on April 26, 2000, in Icy Bay, Alaska. John and an older boy were playing near the edge of a logging camp when a wolf appeared and chased the boys, attacking John when he fell and dragging him and toward the woods. He was saved by his friend's Labrador Retriever, Willie, followed by a group of people, and then John's father arrived and shot the wolf. The wolf was found to have been neither sick nor starving, but habituated to the presence of people. John received 19 laceration and puncture wounds on the back, legs, and buttocks.

=== Pet dogs ===
- Buddy, U.S. President Bill Clinton's Labrador, and Seamus, Clinton's other Labrador, received for Father's Day
- Marley, "The World's Worst Dog", featured in journalist John Grogan's autobiographical book Marley & Me, adapted into a 2008 comedy drama film of the same name
- Koni, Russian President Vladimir Putin's Labrador Retriever
- Widgeon, Prince William's black Labrador.

=== Field (working) dogs ===
- King Buck (1948–1962) successfully completed an unprecedented 63 consecutive series in the National Championship Stake and was the National Retriever Field Trial Club champion for two successive years (in 1952 and 1953), which accomplishment was not duplicated for nearly 40 years. He was also the first dog to appear on a United States Fish and Wildlife Service Duck stamp (1959), which always featured a water fowl.
- Blind of Arden (born c. 1934),Life magazine December 12, 1938: Cover - Labrador Retriever, Blind of Arden". Inside cover text reads: "The dog on this week's cover is Blind of Arden, who won the No. 1 U.S. retriever stake of the year on November 21, had his picture taken at Southampton by LIFE photographer George Karger." and stated to be 4 years old at the time. first dog to appear on the cover of Life (1938), also winning the No.1 competition at the time, the open all-age stake of the Long Island Retriever Club, with a "remarkable" blind recovery.
- NFC-AFC San Joaquin Honcho won the 1976 National Field Trial Championship and accumulated 142 All-age points during his competitive career. He was owned and trained by the famed retriever trainer, Judy Aycock, who purchased him on recommendation from the retriever legend Rex Carr.
- NFC AFC Storm's Riptide Star, or "Rascal," was the first chocolate lab to win the National Field Trial Championship. He was the 1996 National Field Trial Champion. He was handled by Mike Lardy. He was also a finalist in the 1998 National Open.

=== Fiction, TV, books, films and media ===
- Norman Bridwell's Clifford the Big Red Dog is a giant red Labrador Retriever.
- Bat, a blind Black Labrador mix, plays a role in the manga/anime Ginga Densetsu Weed
- Bouncer and Jake (a black lab), from Neighbours
- Brandeis, a Muppet dog on Sesame Street who finds work as a mobility assistance dog. The puppet appears in later episodes, where it is featured in one of several roles which call for a generic dog.
- Brian Griffin from the animated sitcom Family Guy is a white Labrador Retriever. He is highly anthropomorphized (he drinks dry martinis and drives a Toyota Prius), however he still exhibits many traits which are commonly associated with dogs (for example he cannot resist chasing a ball).
- Brown, a Labrador Retriever in Rule of Rose
- Denmark, a sentient Labrador Retriever who is one of the two companions in Castaways of the Flying Dutchman, a series by Brian Jacques
- Dolly, a white Labrador who acted in Korean movies Hearty Paws, Hearty Paws 2, and Blind
- Didier, a Labrador who is transformed into a human form, portrayed by the French actor Alain Chabat, in the film Didier
- Digger is a Labrador Retriever puppy in Big Barn Farm
- Elsie, a black Labrador mix featured in the documentary Street Dogs of South Central
- Gus, Dr. Joe Gannon's yellow Labrador Retriever on Medical Center
- Jet (f.k.a. Bootsy), briefly adopted by the fictional detective genius Nero Wolfe in Rex Stout's 1954 novella Die Like a Dog
- Jordan, belonging to KVBC's chief meteorologist in Las Vegas. He was a local favorite to residents and had many minutes of fame on the air throughout his 13 years of life.
- Krypto, Superman's dog, is portrayed as a white Labrador.
- Labramon is a titular character on Digimon which is based on the Labrador Retriever breed.
- Luath, from The Incredible Journey
- Little Boo, a therapy dog assigned to Big Boo in Orange Is the New Black, is a Labrador
- Merle is a Lab mix featured in Ted Kerasote's book Merle's Door. It follows the life of the dog that Kerasote found on a canoe trip in the Tetons, until Merle's passing and the dog's free range life in a small Wyoming town.
- Orson, a Labrador mix who is a major, semi-sentient character in Fear Nothing by Dean Koontz
- Quill, a guide-dog for the blind whose life is followed in the film of the same name
- Spike, who played "Old Yeller" from the movie Old Yeller
- Radar, the comic Brazil pet dorinha in Monica's Gang
- Raven, the co-star of Ran Schara's Minnesota Bound
- Randolph, the erudite narrator of J.F. Englert's mystery-comedy novel A Dog About Town
- Rowdy, Turk and J.D.'s pet stuffed retriever from the show Scrubs
- Rufus, from the western themed videogame Red Dead Redemption
- Ubu Roi (?–1984), logo and closing credits mascot of Ubu Productions' TV series since 1982
- Vincent, from Lost, played by Madison
- Wowser from Walt Disney's Rascal
- Marley from Marley & Me
- Shadow, the Brenan's black lab from Jonathan Park
- Digger, Cecily King's troublesome dog in Road to Avonlea
- Zuma, a Chocolate Labrador from the children's TV show PAW Patrol
- Mr. Peanutbutter, from the show BoJack Horseman is a Yellow Lab
- An unnamed retriever on the cover of Twice Is Not Enough
- In Bluey, Lucky's family, consisting of himself, younger brother Chucky, and parents Pat and Janelle, are all Golden Labradors, Jean-Luc & his family, consisting of himself, his parents, are all Black Labradors, and Winnie and her father Fido, are Chocolate Labradors

=== Mascots and adverts ===
- The Andrex Puppy, featured primarily in UK television spots for the Andrex brand of toilet paper, known elsewhere as Scott or Kleenex Cottonelle, also featuring the puppy mascot.
- Nigger, a black Labrador, mascot of the Dambusters squadron around 1940. (At the time, in the UK, this name was not seen as an offensive word)
- Zeke the Wonder Dog, mascot and frisbee fanatic for the Michigan State Spartans
- Alien, a black Lab who served as the team mascot for the Memphis Mad Dogs. Alien would charge the field following each kickoff and retrieve the kicking tee.

=== Notable individuals in the development of the breed ===
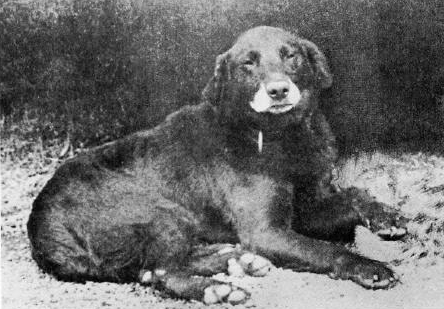
A surviving picture of "Buccleuch Avon" (born 1885), the foundational dog of all modern Labradors

- The Duke of Buccleuch's black Lab Avon ("Buccleuch Avon", m), considered the foundational dog of the modern breed, along with Buccleuch Ned (both gifts from the Earl of Malmesbury) and the Earl of Malmesbury's dogs Malmesbury Tramp (m) and Malmesbury June (f), all pivotal in the foundation of the modern breed. All date to the 1880s. In particular, Jack Vanderwyk traces the origins of all Chocolate labs listed on the LabradorNet database to Buccleuch Avon and the two Malmesbury dogs.
- Ben of Hyde, first yellow lab on record (kennels of Major C.J. Radclyffe, 1899).
- The two famous dogs that rekindled the modern darker ("fox red") colours of yellow Lab—Balrion King Frost, credited as having "the biggest influence in the re-development of the fox red shade", and his great-grandson, the likewise famous Wynfaul Tabasco, described as "the father of the modern fox red Labrador", and the only modern fox red Show Champion in the UK. (Two other dogs, Balrion Red Alert and Scrimshaw Placido Flamingo, are also credited with greatly passing on the genes into more than one renowned bloodline, even though not especially famous themselves).

=== Other ===
- Adjutant (14 August 1936 – 20 November 1963), the oldest known Labrador and the seventh-oldest dog whose age has been verified. Age at death: 27 years 3 months. Lived at the Revesby Estate, near Boston, Lincolnshire in England. Birth certificate validated by Guinness World Records 1966.
- Fidèle (or Fidel) (2003–2016), was a tourist attraction in Bruges, Belgium.
- Pep (c. 1923 – 1930), was a Black Labrador sent to the Eastern State Penitentiary by Pennsylvania governor Gifford Pinchot in 1924. Though he was sent to "boost morale" and had free rein of the prison, he was portrayed in the media as a "cat-murderer" who was given a life sentence. The governor received thousands of letters critical of the dog's incarceration. Pep was liked by guards and prisoners, chased rats in the prison corridors, and was later transferred to the Graterford Prison Farm.

== Notorious labs ==
- Toby, 75 lbs., who killed 2-year-old Megan Stack, left alone downstairs with the dog, in 1988.
- A 9 to 12-week-old lab killed 2-month-old Zane Earls, who had been left alone in 2008. The dog had not been fed in days and was later put to sleep. The teenage mother of Earls was convicted of manslaughter for leaving her baby unattended in a swing for roughly 2 hours while the puppy was loose in the house.

=== Notorious Labrador mixes ===
- Tania, whose 2005 attack on her unconscious owner Isabelle Dinoire led to the world's first partial face transplant.
- Lucky, "Labrador/Golden Retriever mix", who killed two-month-old Aiden McGrew alone in a baby swing in 2012.
- The pair of Labrador/Shepherd mixes, that killed two-year-old Ja'Marr Tiller, alone in his yard in 2012.

== See also ==
- Detection dog
- Dogs in warfare
- Service dog
- List of individual dogs
- List of police dog breeds
