= Jake (rescue dog) =

Search and rescue dog following the 9/11 attacks and Hurricane Katrina

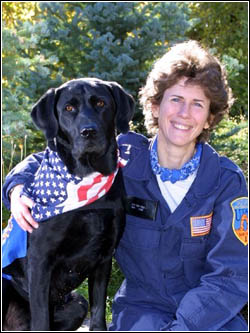
- Jake and Mary Flood, his handler.
- Species: Canis lupus familiaris
- Breed: Labrador Retriever
- Sex: Male
- Born: 1995; Dallas, Texas
- Died: July 25, 2007 (aged 11–12)
- Occupation: Search and rescue
- Employer: Utah Task Force 1
- Known for: Rescue efforts following the September 11 attacks and Hurricane Katrina

Jake (1995 – July 25, 2007) was an American black Labrador who served as a search and rescue dog following the September 11 attacks and Hurricane Katrina. Jake served as a rescue dog from 2001 until his retirement because of cancer in 2006.

== Early life ==
Jake was adopted when he was 10 months old by his owner, Mary Flood. Jake had been found abandoned on the streets with several injuries, including a dislocated hip and a broken leg.

== Career ==
Jake's final owner, Mary Flood, is a member of Utah Task Force 1. Utah Task Force 1 is a federal search and rescue team trained to respond to disasters. Following his recovery from his injuries, Flood helped to train Jake to become a federal "U.S. government certified" rescue dog. There are fewer than 200 of these dogs, who are trained to respond within 24 hours to disasters such as hurricanes, earthquakes, wilderness, water rescue, terrorist attacks, or avalanches. Jake's owner later commented, "...against all odds he became a world-class rescue dog."

Jake was most noted for his work following the September 11 attacks, where he helped search for human remains at Ground Zero. Jake, like other rescue workers and dogs, was honored by New Yorkers as a hero. Jake, wearing his search and rescue vest, was treated to a free steak dinner at an upscale Manhattan restaurant on the evening he arrived to work in New York City. Jake served as a rescue dog at the World Trade Center site for 17 days. Like the humans and other rescue dogs he worked with, Jake was exposed to the physical hazards of Ground Zero, including sharp debris and unhealthy air.

Jake also served in his search and rescue team following Hurricane Katrina in 2005. Jake, along with his Utah Task Force, drove over 30 hours from Utah to Mississippi to help search for survivors and victims of following the hurricane's landfall. Jake was also deployed to the Gulf Coast in the aftermath of Hurricane Rita.

In his later years, Jake helped to train younger prospective rescue dogs, as well as their handlers. Jake helped other dogs to learn to track scents in difficult places and terrain, including under the snow and up trees. Jake also worked as a therapy dog at Utah nursing homes and at a camp for burn victims.

== Death and legacy ==
Jake had been diagnosed with hemangiosarcoma, a blood-borne cancer. He was euthanized on Wednesday, July 25, 2007, after he was found on his front lawn shaking from a 105 degree fever. His owner reportedly took him for one last walk through the fields and creeks of Oakley, Utah, before his death. Jake was 12 years old when he died.

It is unknown whether Jake's cancer can be linked to his rescue work at Ground Zero. Cancer is a very common disease for dogs around Jake's age. Some rescue dog owners have claimed that their dogs have died because of their exposure to the air at the World Trade Center site in the aftermath of the September 11 attacks. However, scientists who have studied the health of rescue animals who worked Ground Zero have found no major signs of illness. In contrast, a 2007 study of 20,000 human rescue workers, such as firefighters, has found that 70% of these workers suffer from respiratory illnesses.

Cynthia Otto, who works for the University of Pennsylvania's School of Veterinary Medicine, is currently conducting a study of the health of September 11 rescue dogs. The results of Jake's necropsy will be used as part of the Penn medical study.

It is believed that illnesses diagnosed in Jake and other rescue animals may serve as harbingers for possible long-term problems in 9/11 rescue workers, both human and animal.

== See also ==
- Bretagne, another 9/11 search-and-rescue dog
- List of individual dogs
- List of Labrador Retrievers
