= Fidèle (dog) =

Dog that rested in a window in Brugge, Belgium

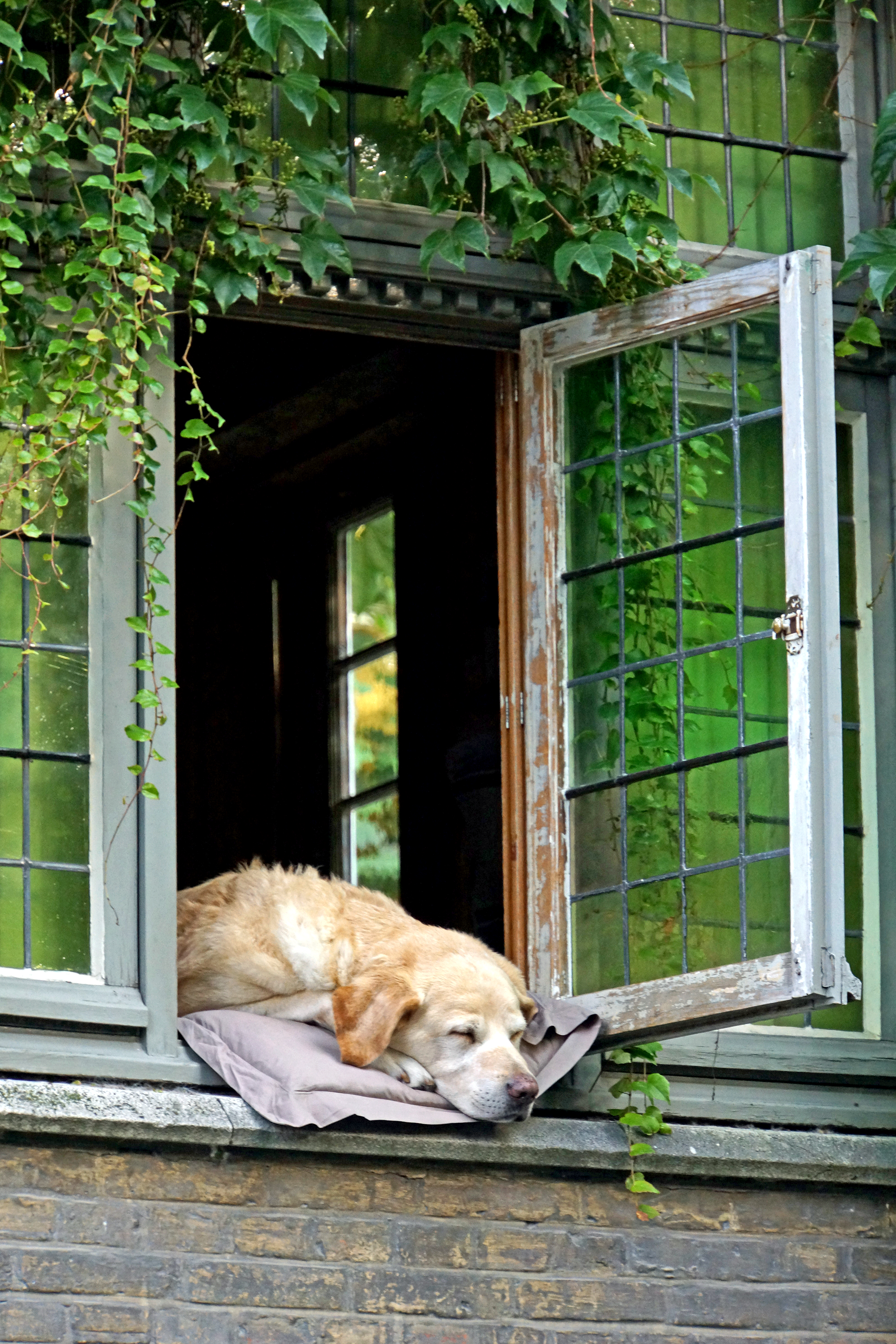
Fidèle in 2013

Fidèle (Fidel in English) (May 2003–January 2016) was a famous dog and tourist attraction in Bruges, Belgium. The Yellow Labrador Retriever lived at the Côté Canal bed and breakfast with his owner, Caroline Van Langeraet. He could usually be seen lounging half-asleep on a windowsill facing the Groenerei canal; Langeraet says that it was his favorite spot for years, in all seasons. Tour boats on the canal often paused specifically to allow the passengers to take Fidèle's picture. According to Langeraet, American tourists sent the dog fan mail and parcels with toys.

In media, Fidèle appeared in a television advertisement for Godiva Chocolatier. He also appeared briefly in the beginning of the movie In Bruges.

== See also ==
- List of individual dogs
- List of Labrador Retrievers
