= Chesapeake Bay Retriever =

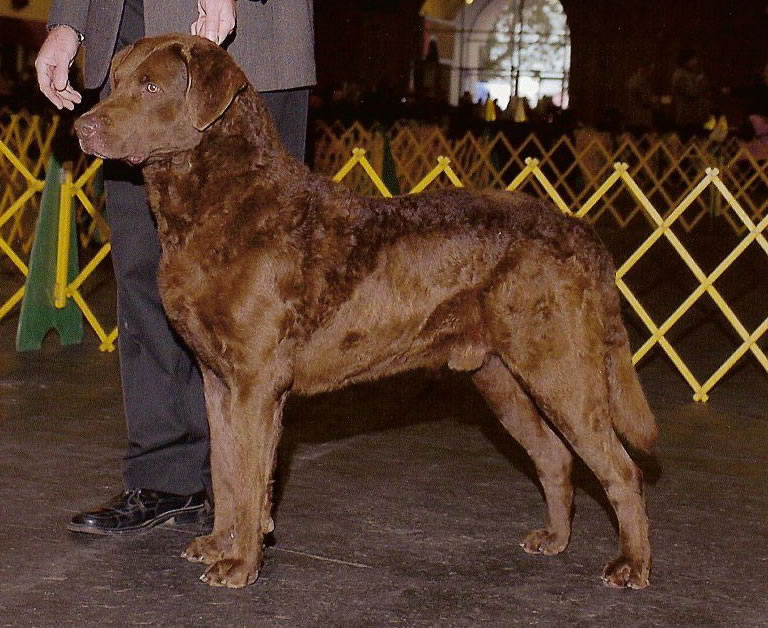
- Common nicknames: Chessie
- Origin: United States
Traits
Height	Males	24 to 26 in (61 to 66 cm)
	Females	22 to 25 in (56 to 64 cm)
Weight	Males	75 to 100 lb (34 to 45 kg)
	Females	66 to 88 lb (30 to 40 kg)
- Coat: A wooly double coat made of fur
- Color: Reddish gold, dead-grass, and liver, with limited white spots
Kennel club standards
- American Kennel Club: standard
- Fédération Cynologique Internationale: standard
- Notes: State dog of Maryland

The Chesapeake Bay Retriever is a large breed of dog belonging to the retriever, gundog, and sporting breed groups. The breed was developed in the United States Chesapeake Bay area during the 19th century. Historically used by local market hunters to retrieve waterfowl, pull fishing nets, and rescue fishermen, it is today primarily a family pet and hunting companion, known for a bright and happy disposition; courage; willingness to work; alertness; intelligence; love of water; and hunting capabilities. The Chesapeake is a medium- to large-sized dog similar in appearance to the Labrador Retriever, but with a wavy coat.

== Appearance ==
Distinctive features include eyes that are very clear, of yellowish or amber hue, hindquarters as high or a trifle higher than the shoulders, and a double-coat that tends to wave on shoulders, neck, back, and loins. The waterproof coat feels slightly oily and is often associated with a slight musky odor. Three basic colors are generally seen in the breed: brown, which includes all shades from a light to a deep dark brown; sedge, which varies from a reddish yellow through a bright red to chestnut shades; and deadgrass in all its shades, varying from a faded tan to a dull straw color. The breed standard states that white may also appear but it must be limited to the breast, belly, toes, or back of the feet. The head is round and broad with a medium stop and muzzle. The lips are thin, and the ears are small and of medium leather. The forelegs should be straight with good bone. The hindquarters are especially strong and the toes webbed since excellent swimming ability is important for the Chesapeake. This breed is also known for its large and powerful chest, used to break apart ice when diving into cold water while duck hunting.

=== Coat ===
The coat of the Chesapeake Bay Retriever is given the most consideration of any trait listed on the Positive Scale of Points in the Breed Standard. However the AKC Standard also reads "The question of coat and general type of balance takes precedence over any scoring table which could be drawn up. The Chesapeake should be well proportioned, an animal with a good coat and well balanced in other points being preferable to one excelling in some but weak in others." The hair on the face and legs should be very short and straight with a tendency to wave, never curl, on the shoulders, neck, back, and loins only and nowhere over 1.5 inches (38 mm) long. Moderate feathering on the rear of the hindquarters and tail is permissible although not longer than 1.75 inches (44 mm) long. The texture of the thick double-coat is important in protecting the dog from cold water and icy conditions. The oil in the harsh outer coat and woolly undercoat resists water, keeping the dog dry and warm. Maintenance of the coat is minimal and mainly consists of brushing with a short-tooth brush once a week. It is difficult to get a Chesapeake Bay Retriever thoroughly wet, but they should be bathed every 3–4 months using a suitably mild shampoo, then dried thoroughly. Brushing or bathing more often can ruin the texture since it strips the protective oil from the coat and may even remove the undercoat. The color of the coat must be similar to the working surroundings. Any color of brown, sedge, or deadgrass is acceptable and one color is not preferred over another. The American Chesapeake Club includes a discussion on color:

Three basic colors are generally seen in the breed: Brown which includes all shades from a light cocoa (a silvered brown) to a deep bittersweet chocolate color; sedge which varies from a reddish yellow through a bright red to chestnut shades; deadgrass which takes in all shades of deadgrass, varying from a faded tan to a dull straw color. Historic records show that some of the deadgrass shades can be very light, almost white in appearance, while darker deadgrass colors can include diluted shades of brown called ash, that appear as either gray or taupe. The almost white and ash/taupe/gray shades are not commonly seen, but are acceptable.

The difference between a sedge and a deadgrass is that the deadgrass shades contain no significant amount of red, while the sedge shades do have red. Coat and texture also play a factor in the perception of color. The self-color pattern is preferred by the standard (One color with or without lighter and darker shadings of the same color). You will see dogs with varying degrees of other markings such as: masking on top of the skull, striping effect of light & dark through the body and on legs, distinct & indistinct saddle markings, agouti coloring and tan points. All are acceptable, they are just not preferred.

— American Chesapeake Club

A white spot on the breast (not extending above the sternum), belly, toes, or back of the feet is permissible, but the smaller the spot the better. White beyond these areas and black anywhere on the body is not allowed in the breed standard.

== Temperament ==
The quintessential Chesapeake Bay Retriever has a bright and happy disposition, intelligence, quiet good sense, and an affectionate protective nature. Some can be quite vocal when happy, and some will "smile" by baring their front teeth in a peculiar grin; this is not a threat, but a sign of joy or submissiveness.

Chesapeake Bay Retrievers can make excellent family dogs when socialized properly. Some Chesapeakes are assertive and willful and may be reserved with strangers, but others are passive and outgoing with people.

=== Training ===
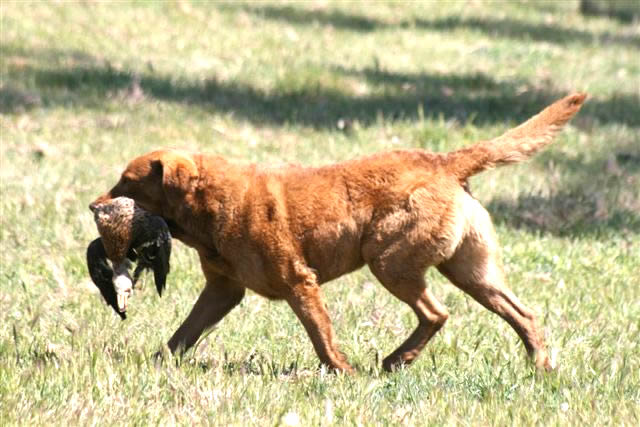
A Chesapeake Bay Retriever returning with a Mallard duck

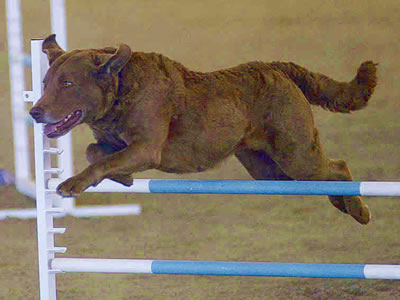
A Chesapeake Bay Retriever competing in agility

The Chesapeake Bay Retriever is a versatile breed competing in field trials, hunt tests, conformation, obedience, agility, and tracking, yet remains true to its roots as a hunting dog of great stamina and ability. The Chesapeake Bay Retriever is an intelligent breed and learns at a high speed. Historically considered stubborn and difficult to train, many trainers thought this breed required more physical discipline than other retriever breeds. Some trainers now recommend that the Chesapeake Bay Retriever owner use consistent, daily obedience training with play time before and after to keep the dog wanting to work with little or no physical discipline required.

== Health ==
The breed is subject to a number of hereditary diseases. These include, but are not limited to:

- Exercise-induced collapse
- Hip dysplasia
- Progressive retinal atrophy
- Type 3 von Willebrand disease
- Cataract
- Regional Alopecia in both sexes

A UK Kennel Club survey puts the median lifespan of the breed at 10.75 years (average 9.85). A US breed club survey puts the average lifespan at 9.4 years. One in four lived to 13 years or more, while one in five did not live past 5 years.

The Chesapeake Bay Retriever is one of the breeds more commonly affected by degenerative myelopathy.

== History ==
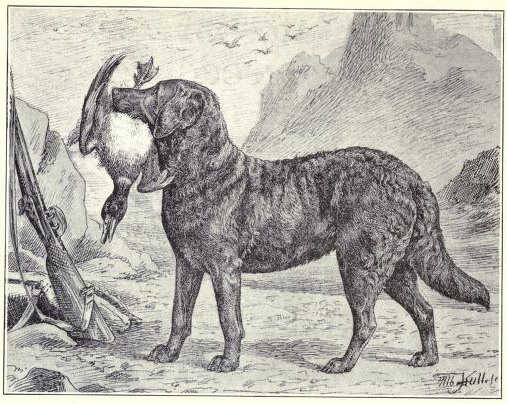
A Chesapeake Bay Retriever circa 1915

Chesapeake Bay Retrievers trace their history to two pups who were rescued from a foundering ship in Maryland in 1807. The male "Sailor" and female "Canton" were described as Newfoundland dogs, but were more accurately Lesser Newfoundland or St. John's water dogs. These two lived in different parts of the bay area and there is no record of a litter being produced together. They were bred with area dogs, with more consideration given to ability than to breed, to create the beginnings of the Chesapeake Bay Retriever breed. There are few records of the breeds of these early dogs, but spaniels and hounds were included. Dogs from both Chesapeake Bay shores were recognized as one of three types of Chesapeake Bay Ducking Dog in 1877. In 1918 a single type, called the Chesapeake Bay Retriever, was recognized by the American Kennel Club, and there have been few changes to the breed standard since then.

George Law, who rescued the pups, wrote this account in 1845 which appears on the website of the American Chesapeake Bay Retriever Club:

In the fall of 1807 I was on board of the ship Canton, belonging to my uncle, the late Hugh Thompson, of Baltimore, when we fell in, at sea, near the termination of a very heavy equinoctial gale, with an English brig in a sinking condition, and took off the crew. The brig was loaded with codfish, and was bound to Pole, in England, from Newfoundland. I boarded her, in command of a boat from the Canton, which was sent to take off the English crew, the brig's own boats having been all swept away, and her crew in a state of intoxication. I found onboard of her two Newfoundland pups, male and female, which I saved, and subsequently, on our landing the English crew at Norfolk, our own destination being Baltimore, I purchased these two pups of the English captain for a guinea apiece. Being bound again to sea, I gave the dog pup, which was called Sailor, to Mr. John Mercer, of West River; and the slut pup, which was called Canton, to Doctor James Stewart, of Sparrow's Point. The history which the English captain gave me of these pups was, that the owner of his brig was extensively engaged in the Newfoundland trade, and had directed his correspondent to select and send him a pair of pups of the most approved Newfoundland breed, but of different families, and that the pair I purchased of him were selected under this order. The dog was of a dingy red colour; and the slut black. They were not large; their hair was short, but very thick-coated; they had dew claws. Both attained great reputation as water-dogs. They were most sagacious in every thing, particularly so in all duties connected with duck-shooting. Governor Lloyd exchanged a Merino ram for the dog, at the time of the Merino fever, when such rams were selling for many hundred dollars, and took him over to his estate on the eastern shore of Maryland, where his progeny were well known for many years after; and may still be known there, and on the western shore, as the Sailor breed. The slut remained at Sparrows Point till her death, and her progeny were and are still well known, through Patapsco Neck, on the Gunpowder, and up the bay, amongst the duck-shooters, as unsurpassed for their purposes. I have heard both Doctor Stewart and Mr. Mercer relate most extraordinary instances of the sagacity and performance of both dog and slut, and would refer you to their friends for such particulars as I am unable, at this distance of time, to recollect with sufficient accuracy to repeat.

Mercer is said to have described Sailor:

... he was of fine size and figure-lofty in his carriage, and built for strength and activity; remarkably muscular and broad across the hips and breast; head large, but not out of proportion; muzzle rather longer than is common with that race of dogs; his colour a dingy red, with some white on the face and breast; his coat short and smooth, but uncommonly thick, and more like a coarse fur than hair; tail full, with long hair, and always carried very high. His eyes were very peculiar: they were so light as to have almost an unnatural appearance, something resembling what is termed a wail eye, in a horse; and it is remarkable, that in a visit which I made to the Eastern Shore, nearly twenty years after he was sent there, in a sloop which had been sent expressly for him, to West River, by Governor Lloyd, I saw many of his descendants who were marked with this peculiarity.

In 1964, it was declared the official dog of Maryland. It is the mascot of the University of Maryland, Baltimore County.

Members of the breed were owned by General George Armstrong Custer, President Theodore Roosevelt, Senator John McCain, and actors Paul Walker and Tom Felton.

== See also ==
- List of dog breeds
