= Zeke the Wonder Dog =

Stage name of several Frisbee-catching dogs

Zeke the Wonder Dog is the stage name of a series of Frisbee-catching dogs that have performed during halftime shows at Michigan State University Spartan football games since the late 1970s.

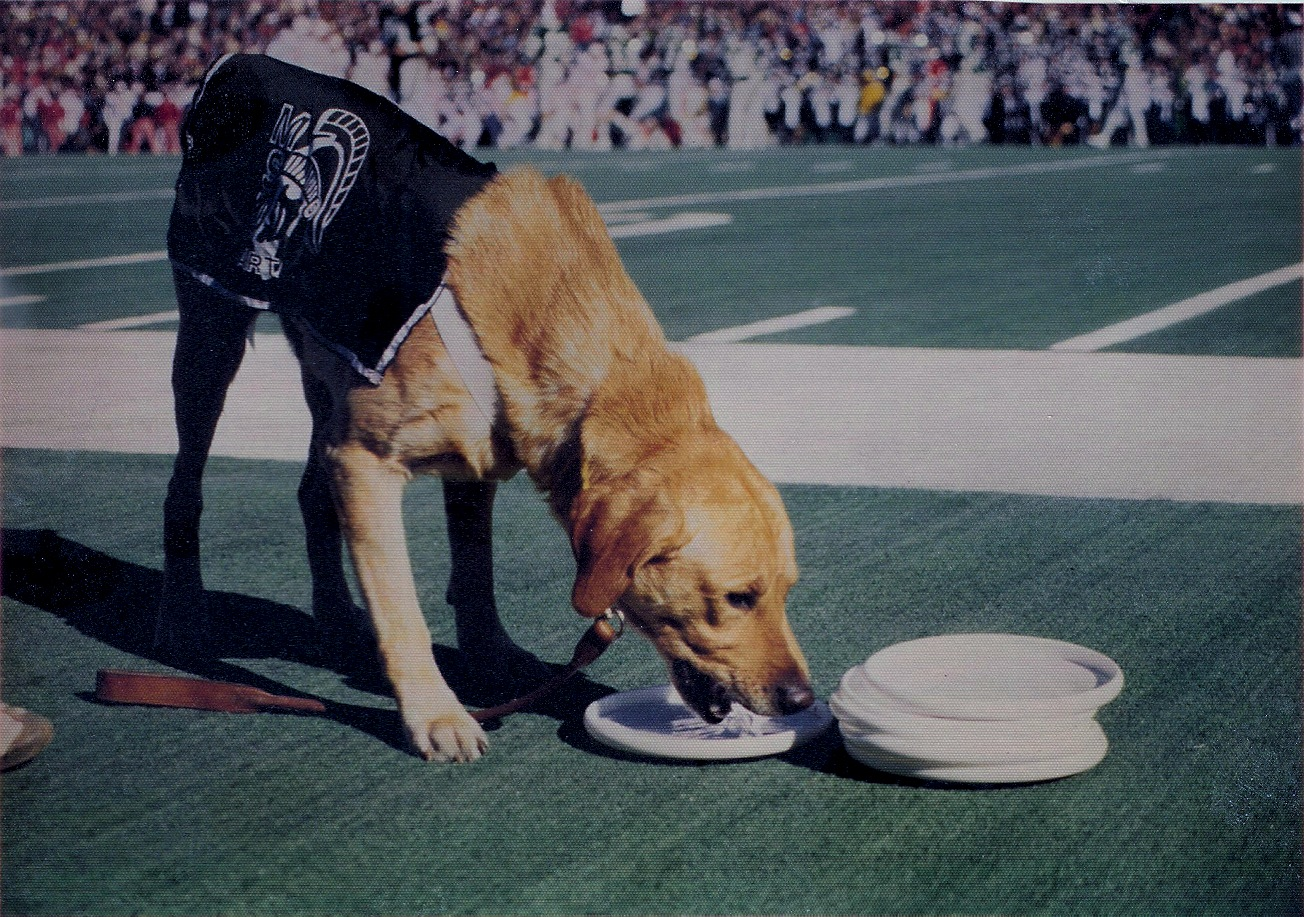
The original Zeke, 1978

== Zeke ==
The original Zeke was a yellow Labrador owned by Gary Eisenberg, who as a junior at MSU in the mid-1970s competed with Zeke (full name Ezekiel) in the disc-catching national championships held at the Rose Bowl in Pasadena, California. Officials in the MSU Athletic Department noticed Gary and Zeke's success and in 1977 invited them to perform during a Spartan football game. They did so, and a new tradition was born.

In 1978, head coach Darryl Rogers was quoted as saying Zeke was the best receiver in the Big Ten. He awarded Zeke a football letter, "to this day the only non-human to letter at Michigan State."

After 1981, Zeke performed on a limited basis before his retirement at the age of ten in 1984. He died in 1987.

== Keze ==
Keze (pronounced "Kee-zee"), no relation to Zeke, was a chocolate Lab and the runt of her litter; her small size made her a more agile performer than her larger "brother". Keze's name, the reversal of Zeke, was the result of "a contest run by the Lansing State Journal that received more than 12,000 entries." She performed for a single season in 1981. The following year, she was hit by a motorist and killed.

== Zeke II ==
After a hiatus of twenty years, in 2002 the MSU Athletic Department revived the frisbee-dog tradition. Open auditions resulted in the selection of Dexter, a black Lab owned by Terry and Jim Foley of Holland, Michigan. Dexter, as Zeke II, was an immediate hit with MSU alumni who remembered the original Zeke the Wonder Dog, and quickly established himself with current MSU students who were likely too young to remember Zeke. Handled by Jim Foley, and with training guidance provided by the original Zeke's Gary Eisenberg, Zeke II performed throughout the 2002–2005 football seasons.

In December 2005, Dexter was admitted to the MSU Small Animal Clinic for an intestinal obstruction caused by having eaten a substantial amount of carpet at his home. Thanks to the efforts of Dr. Bryden Stanley and her staff, who completed a 90-minute abdominal surgery, Dexter's life was spared.

Zeke II returned to halftime action for the 2006 football season, but prior to the November 11 game against Minnesota he tore the anterior cruciate ligament in his right rear knee and was again admitted to the MSU Small Animal Clinic. Dr. Loic Dejardin, an orthopedic surgeon at MSU’s Veterinary Teaching Hospital, repaired the damage. Two months of rehabilitation followed.

In 2007, Zeke II began to show signs of age, particularly with cataracts that were beginning to cloud his eyes and hinder his ability to see the disc. At the age of ten, Zeke II performed his final show on September 8, 2007, completing a brief two-minute routine while the Spartan Alumni Marching Band played the "Zeke the Wonder Dog Medley"—consisting of "(How Much Is) That Doggie in the Window?", "Who Let The Dogs Out", and Led Zeppelin's "Black Dog". Some of the Frisbees were tossed by Dr. Dejardin, Zeke II's orthopedic surgeon.

On the morning of February 11, 2012, Zeke II died peacefully at the age of 16.

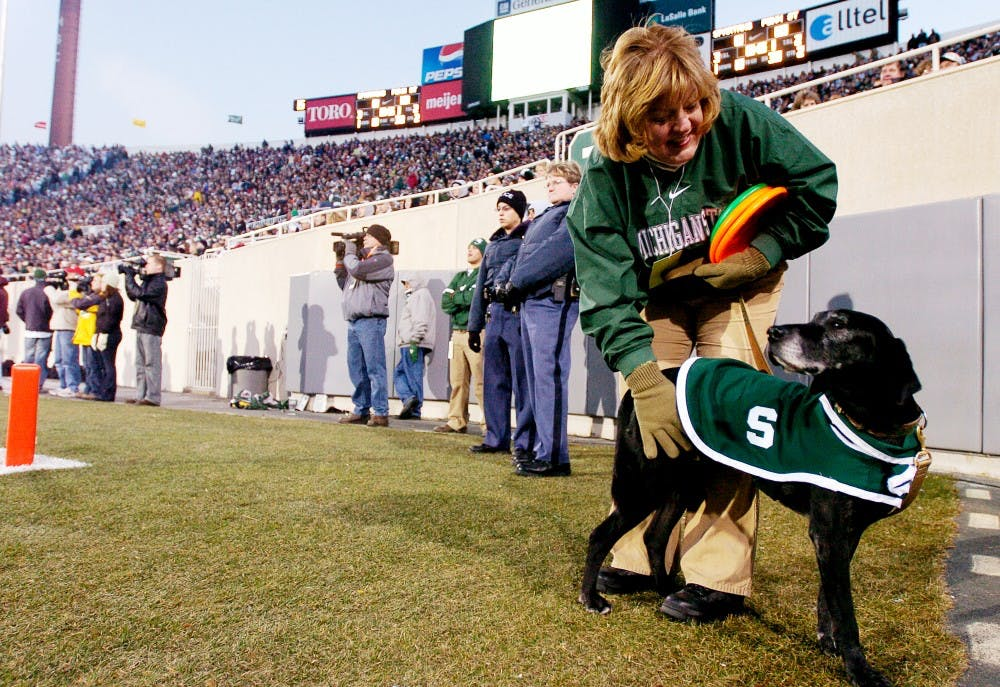
Zeke II with caretaker

== Zeke III ==
In anticipation of Dexter's retirement, the Foleys began training his replacement in 2006, with Eisenberg again as their training advisor. Bou Cou, a 21-month-old male pedigreed yellow Lab, debuted as Zeke III at halftime in Spartan Stadium on September 15, 2007.

He died suddenly on December 2, 2016 from a previously undiagnosed pancreatic tumor.

== Zeke IV ==
Formerly known as Buckshot, this firecracker red English lab was a member of Zeke III's troupe of performing dogs but wasn't related to him. He debuted as the new Zeke on Dec. 3, 2016 at the MSU Men's Basketball game against the Oral Roberts Golden Eagles. Zeke IV's first solo performance occurred at this MSU men's basketball game the day after Zeke III died. Zeke IV has an extensive resume that includes appearances at NFL football games, MSU Alumni Association functions, festivals, parades and golf outings. Zeke IV died on March 1, 2026 surrounded by family and friends after serving nearly 10 years in the role .

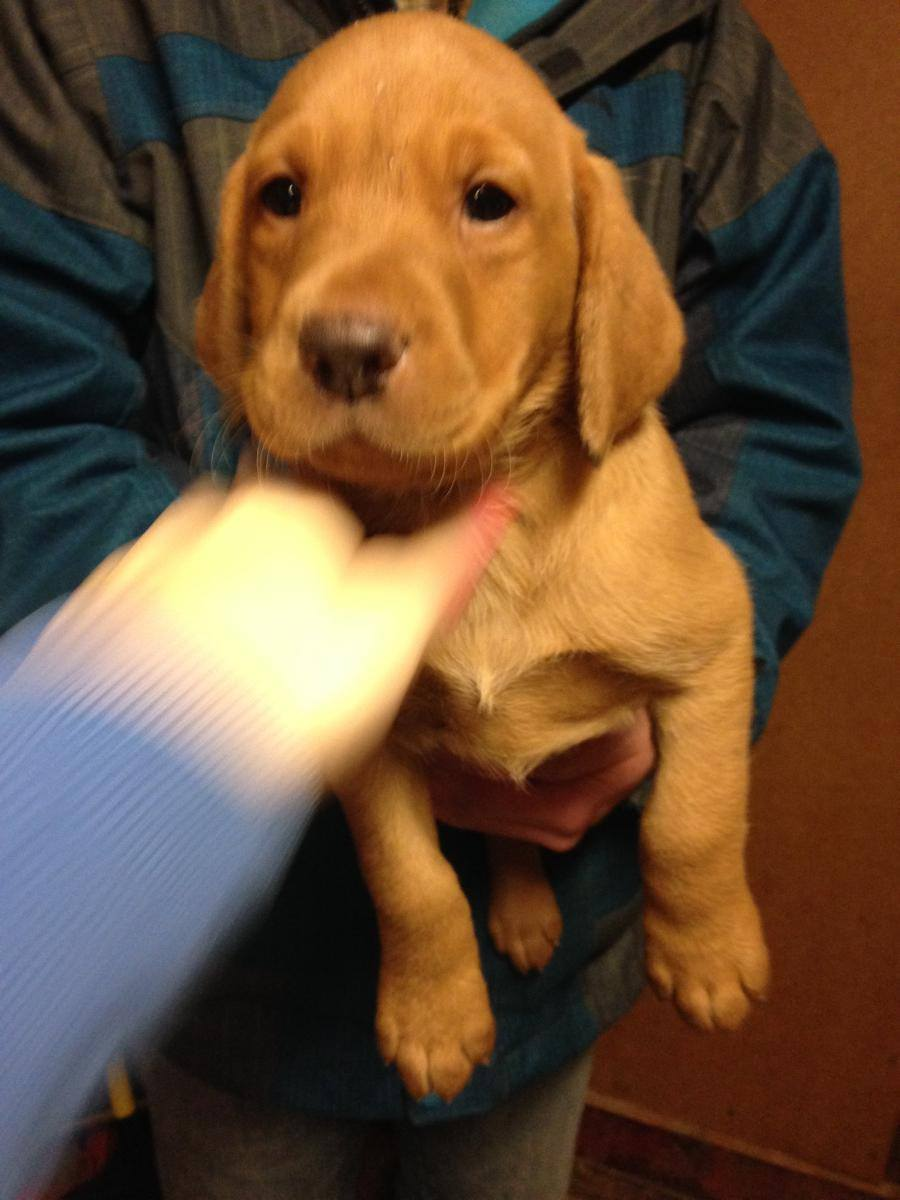
Zeke IV (Buckshot) as a puppy

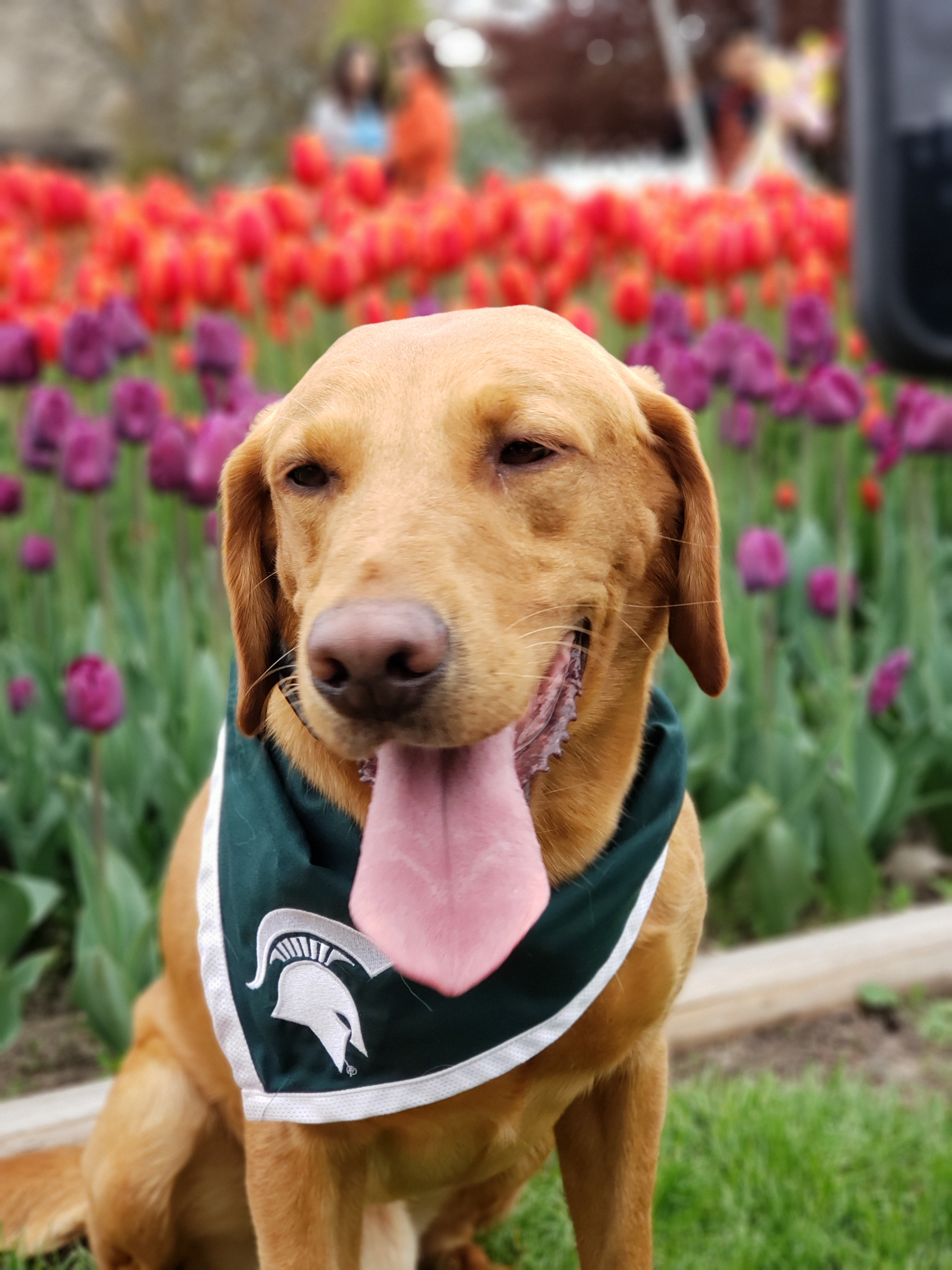
Zeke IV at the Holland Tulip Time Parade

== Zeke V ==
Cindy Lou is Zeke V. She is the second ever female wonder dog and the first since 1982. She is Zeke IV's niece. She made her debut on April 18, 2026 at Spartan Stadium for the 2026 spring showcase.

== See also ==
- List of individual dogs
- List of Labrador Retrievers
