= Zanjeer =

Zanjeer may refer to:

- Zanjeer (1973 film), a 1973 Indian film starring Amitabh Bachchan and Jaya Bachchan
  - Zanjeer (2013 film), a 2013 Indian film starring Ram Charan and Priyanka Chopra, remake of the 1973 film
- Zanjeer (1998 film), a 1998 Indian action film
- Zanjeer (dog), a bomb-sniffing dog who served with distinction during the 1993 Mumbai bombings
- Zanjir, a type of chain used in Mourning of Muharram
