= Bretagne (dog) =

Golden Retriever rescue dog

- Bretagne resting during search-and-rescue work at Ground Zero, photographed by Andrea Booher on September 21, 2001
- Species: Canis familiaris
- Breed: Golden Retriever
- Sex: Female
- Born: August 25, 1999
- Died: June 6, 2016 (aged 16); Cypress, Texas

Bretagne (August 25, 1999–June 6, 2016) (pronounced Brittany) was a Golden Retriever rescue dog who searched for survivors at Ground Zero after the September 11 attacks. It was the first assignment for her and her owner and trainer, Denise Corliss, and they worked there for 10 days. Corliss, a volunteer firefighter with the Cy-Fair Fire Department, began training Bretagne for search and rescue work at just eight weeks old.

She appeared on the Today Show along with NBC News’ Tom Brokaw. She later participated in rescue efforts after Hurricanes Rita, Katrina and Ivan. She was retired at the age of 9. After her retirement, she continued her community service as a reading dog at a local elementary school. First grade students who were shy about reading aloud were more willing when Bretagne was there lending a friendly listening ear.

She is believed to have been the last surviving dog from the 9/11 attacks when she was euthanized in Texas in 2016; she was 16 years old and suffering from kidney failure. As Bretagne entered the animal hospital in Cypress, Texas, firefighters and search and rescue workers from the fire department lined the sidewalk and saluted. When she was carried out later by the search and rescue workers, in a casket draped in a Texas flag, the line of firefighters resumed their salute wearing black bands across their badges.

== See also ==
- Jake (rescue dog), another 9/11 search dog
- List of individual dogs
