= Sadie (dog) =

Black Labrador Retriever

- Species: Dog
- Breed: Labrador Retriever
- Sex: Female
- Born: 1996
- Died: 2019
- Nationality: United Kingdom
- Notable role: Dogs in warfare / Detection dog
- Awards: Dickin Medal

Sadie, (1996–2019), a black Labrador Retriever, was a recipient of the Dickin Medal, the animal equivalent of the Victoria Cross. She was awarded for detecting an explosive device outside the United Nations headquarters in Kabul in November 2005, and was awarded by Princess Alexandra on 6 February 2007. Her handler at the time of the action which resulted in the award was Lance Corporal Karen Yardley.

== Military service ==
Trained in Leicestershire, Sadie served in Bosnia, Iraq, and Afghanistan and was part of the 102 Military Working Dog Support Unit of the Royal Army Veterinary Corps (RAVC) based in Sennelager, Germany. She has served for two years and has completed two tours of duty with her handler Lance Corporal Karen Yardly (female RAVC soldiers could serve on the front lines, unlike infantry up until 2020).

Following her military service and the awarding of a Dickin Medal, she retired to live with her handler.

== Dickin Medal ==
In November 2005 forces serving with NATO's International Security Assistance Force were involved in two separate attacks. Sadie and her handler, L/Cpl Karen Yardley, were deployed to search for explosive devices outside the United Nations headquarters in Kabul following a suicide attack. Sadie picked up the scent of a second device through a 2 feet (0.61 m) thick concrete wall, giving disposal experts the opportunity to defuse the bomb which was a pressure cooker bomb—a pressure cooker filled with TNT. The bomb had been covered with sandbags, in order to kill and injure rescue workers following the suicide attack. For her actions, Sadie was awarded the Dickin Medal. Awarded by the People's Dispensary for Sick Animals, it is considered to be the animal's Victoria Cross.

Sadie's Dickin Award citation reads as follows: "Sadie gave a positive indication near a concrete blast wall and multinational personnel were moved to a safe distance. At the site of Sadie's indication, bomb disposal operators later made safe an explosive device. The bomb was designed to inflict maximum injury." Sadie became the 61st recipient of the medal, which she received from Her Royal Highness Princess Alexandra on 6 February 2007 in a ceremony at the Imperial War Museum in London, England. Marilyn Rydström, of the PDSA, said of Sadie's award; "The Dickin Medal is the highest award any animal can receive for bravery in the line of duty and Sadie is a very worthy recipient".

The Dickin Medal is often referred to as the animal equivalent of the Victoria Cross.

At a ceremony to commemorate the restoration of the PDSA's Ilford Animal Cemetery in December 2007, Sadie attended with other recent winners of the Dickin Medal as the cemetery is the final resting place of several previous medallists.

== See also ==
- List of Labrador Retrievers
- List of individual dogs
