= Konni (dog) =

Dog owned by Vladimir Putin

Konni Конни
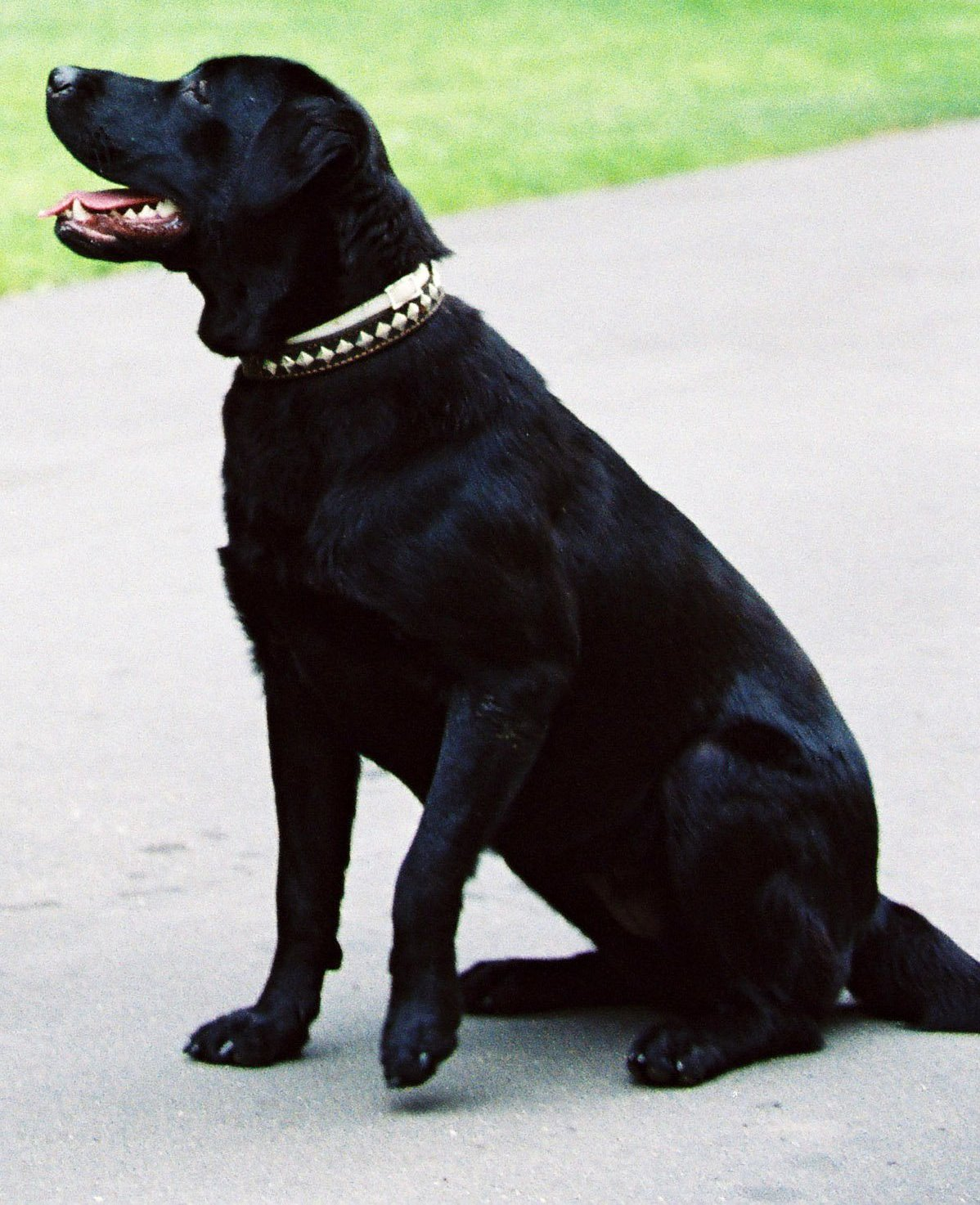
- Konni in 2001
- Other name: Koni (Кони)
- Breed: Labrador Retriever
- Sex: Female
- Born: Connie Paulgrave; 1999
- Died: 2014 (aged 15)
- Offspring: 8

Connie Paulgrave (Russian: Конни Леод Полгрейв; 1999–2014), also known as Konni (Russian: Конни), was a female black Labrador Retriever owned by Vladimir Putin. She was often at his side, including at meetings between him and various world leaders during their visits to Russia.

== Early life ==
Konni, a black Labrador Retriever and whose full name was Connie Paulgrave, was born in 1999. As writer Steven Lee Myers states, "she was said to be descended from a Labrador once owned by Leonid Brezhnev." She was also to be trained as a search and rescue dog at the Ministry of Emergency Situations near Noginsk, where in 2000, she was presented to President Vladimir Putin as a gift by Sergei Shoigu.

Putin taught Konni "five basic commands: down, heel, sit, go, and bark". She would become his favorite pet, serving as what Putin described as a consultant during his own "bad moods". In 2003, Putin's security detail stopped Konni from following him into a meeting with journalists, resulting in her expressing dissatisfaction by barking loudly and refusing several orders by Putin to come to him as the meeting progressed.

Shortly before the 2003 Russian legislative election, Konni gave birth to eight puppies, all of which were given away.

== Foreign affairs ==
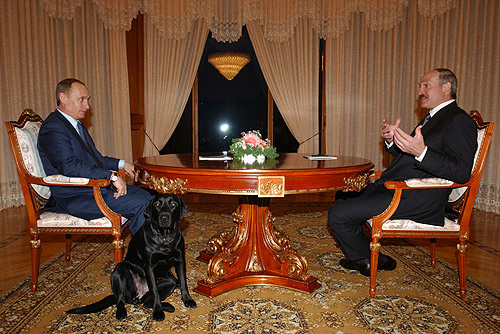
Konni with Putin and Alexander Lukashenko, 2003

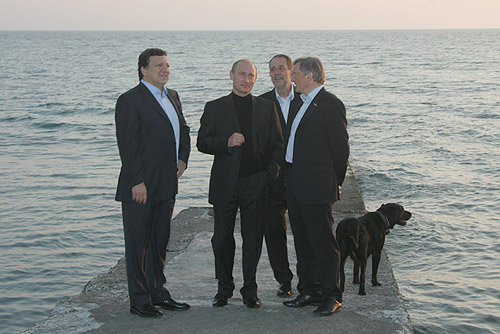
Konni with José Manuel Barroso, Vladimir Putin, Javier Solana, and Wolfgang Schuessel, 2006

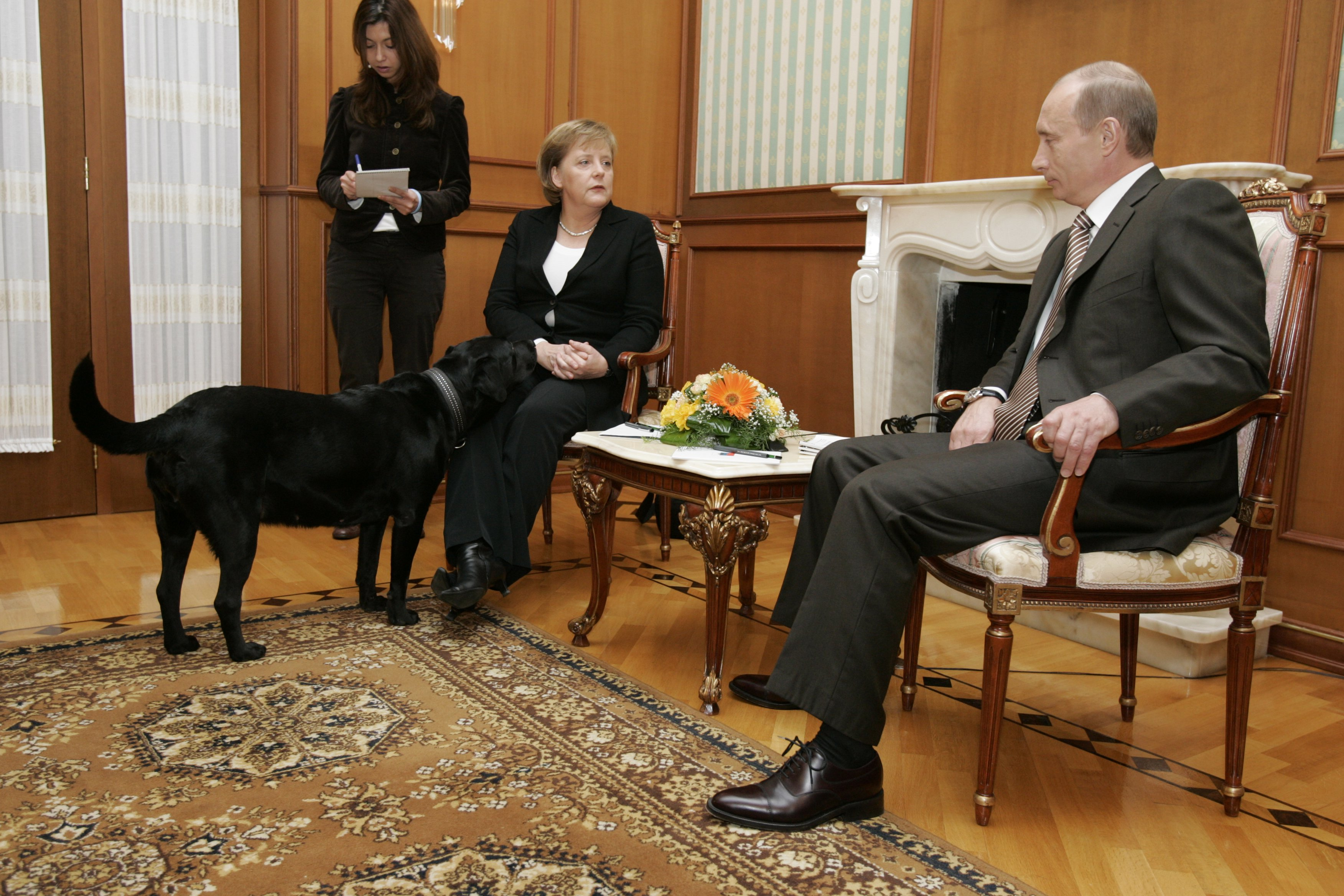
Konni with Angela Merkel and Putin, 2007

U.S. president George W. Bush recalled his 2006 visit to Novo-Ogaryovo, where Konni charged across the lawn and Putin described her to him as "Bigger, tougher, stronger, faster, meaner—than Barney." While Bush's aides were inclined to dismiss Putin's remark as humorous, Bush himself retold the story to Canadian prime minister Stephen Harper, who replied, "You're lucky he only showed you his dog." Ian Davis of The Guardian interpreted the remark as Putin's disdain for Barney.

In 2007, German chancellor Angela Merkel had bilateral talks with Putin, accompanied by Konni, at his vacation home in Sochi. Throughout the talks, Konni stayed close to both Putin and Merkel, who reportedly had a fear of dogs. Putin told Merkel, "I hope the dog does not frighten you." However, she appeared to be unsettled by Konni. Later, Putin denied using his dog to intimidate Merkel, while Merkel said of Putin's behaviour: "I understand why he has to do this—to prove he's a man. ... He's afraid of his own weakness. Russia has nothing, no successful politics or economy. All they have is this", referring to Konni. In an interview two years earlier, Merkel had described the situation in a different way: "I didn't believe at the time that he wanted to intimidate me on purpose," According to the interview, she interpreted it to mean that Putin wanted to do her a favor because of her love for animals.

== Later life and legacy ==
Konni as Putin's foreign affairs advisor in a Ogoniok-published comic strip

In 2008, Konni was used to test a GLONASS-enabled pet collar, something she felt irritated wearing. She was also jokingly regarded by several commentators as Putin's potential successor as president of Russia in the presidential election for her frequent appearances alongside him. Konni died six years later.

Konni was viewed as intimidating to some during meetings between Putin and various world leaders, while others had viewed her as a "humanizing prop" in such functions.

Konni is depicted in Connie's Stories, a 60-page book written by Irina Borisova in English and published by Detskaya Literatura. The book chronicles the life and adventures of Connie, a black Labrador, who at the end is revealed to be Putin's dog. She is also depicted in the Ogoniok publication of a satirical series of comic strips as an advisor to Putin on matters relating to the foreign relations of Russia.

== See also ==
- List of individual dogs
- List of Labrador Retrievers
- Pets of Vladimir Putin

== Works cited ==
- Bush, George W. (2010). Decision Points. Crown Publishing Group. ISBN 978-0-307-59061-9.
- Hachigian, Nina; Sutphen, Mona (2008). The Next American Century: How the U.S. Can Thrive as Other Powers Rise. Simon and Schuster. ISBN 978-0-7432-9099-9.
- Myers, Steven Lee (2015). The New Tsar: The Rise and Reign of Vladimir Putin. Simon and Schuster. ISBN 978-0-307-96161-7.
- Plamper, Jan (2017). The History of Emotions: An Introduction. Oxford University Press. ISBN 978-0-19-966833-5.
- Roscher, Mieke; Krebber, André; Mizelle, Brett, eds. (2021). Handbook of Historical Animal Studies. Walter de Gruyter GmbH. ISBN 978-3-11-053429-0.
- Taylor, Brian D. (2018). The Code of Putinism. Oxford University Press. ISBN 978-0-19-086731-7.
