= Lucky and Flo =

Detection dogs

Lucky and Flo were a pair of black Labrador Retrievers trained by Dr. Neil Powell, notable for being the first animals trained to detect optical discs by scent. In 2006 they were sponsored by the Motion Picture Association of America (MPAA) and Federation Against Copyright Theft (FACT) as part of an initiative to combat copyright infringement of film DVDs.

The dogs' abilities were first demonstrated in May 2006 at the FedEx shipping hub at London Stansted Airport, though inspectors found all the discs the dogs detected that day to be legitimate. Another demonstration was held at the MPAA's Washington, D.C. office on September 26, 2006. In March 2007 the two dogs were sent to Malaysia to help sniff out DVDs. After a raid on a bootleg DVD ring in Johor Bahru on March 20, reports said that the dogs had been targeted by the DVD pirates and that a bounty had been put on their heads. Although the dogs worked to detect counterfeit DVDs, they had no ability to distinguish such counterfeits from other polycarbonate optical discs.

In March 2008 the MPAA, along with children's magazine the Weekly Reader, released a curriculum for grades 5 to 7 featuring Lucky and Flo to be distributed to nearly 60,000 classrooms in 20,000 schools across 10 U.S. states and designed to "educate children about the importance of respecting copyrights while presenting it in a fun and exciting way," according to then-MPAA chairman and CEO Dan Glickman. Glickman lavished praise on the canines, saying that the dogs were "some of the greatest employees we have here at the MPAA".

== See also ==
- Working dog
- List of Labradors
- List of individual dogs
