= Street Dogs of South Central =

- Directed by: Bill Marin
- Produced by: Bill Marin; Vincent Ueber; Rene Duran
- Narrated by: Queen Latifah
- Edited by: Jeff Dawson
- Release date: April 2012 (Atlanta)
- Country: United States
- Language: English

Street Dogs of South Central is an 85-minute documentary film directed by Bill Marin and distributed by Lionsgate in association with Animal Planet. Narrated by Queen Latifah, it is a nature documentary depicting the lives of stray dogs on the streets of South Central Los Angeles.

The story follows the life of Elsie—a black labrador mix—and her struggles in raising her pups on the streets of Los Angeles. The film is set to premiere on Animal Planet and OWN in 2012.

The film screened at the 2012 Atlanta Film Festival, the 2012 Vancouver International Film Festival, and the 2012 St. Louis International Film Festival.

The film was nominated for the Genesis Awards in the TV Documentary category.
