= Minnesota Bound =

- Presented by: Ron Schara
- Country of origin: United States

Production
- Production company: Ron Schara Productions

Original release
- Network: Syndication
- Release: 1995 – present

Minnesota Bound is a television series that covers nature and activities in Minnesota. It has been produced since 1995, and is broadcast weekly on KARE, KTTC, KVLY, and KBJR. From 1995 to 2018, the show starred Ron Schara and his dog, Raven, a Black Labrador Retriever. The show had broadcast 1,000 episodes by 2021. There were three Ravens over the course of Ron's tenure: Raven I (1995-2005), Raven II (2005–07), Raven III (born July 2006, Debuted January 2007, died March 2020).

Minnesota Bound is also a weekly story segment on Kare 11 News, also starring Ron Schara.
