= St. John's water dog =

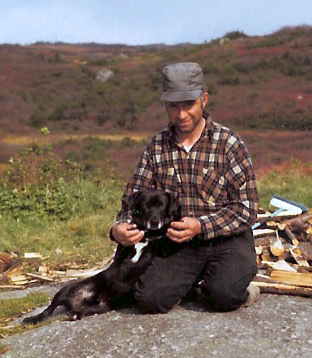
- A Newfoundland outport fisherman with his young St. John's water dog, photographed 1971 in La Poile, Newfoundland
- Other names: Lesser Newfoundland
- Origin: Newfoundland
- Variety status: Extinct. Not recognized as a breed by any major kennel club.
Traits
| Height | Males | 22-24 inches (55-61 cm) |
| | Females | 21-23 inches (54-59 cm) |
| Weight | Males | 40-90 pounds (18-40 kg) |
| | Females | 35-84 pounds (16-38 kg) |
- Colour: Black with white tuxedo markings
- Notes: The St. John's water dog first developed on the island of Newfoundland sometime between 1494-1790 as European fishing dogs were brought to the region. During its development, Newfoundland was being colonized by Europeans; while contested, Newfoundland was primarily a British colony until Canada was formed in 1867 and Newfoundland voted to join the country 1949. The dog went extinct in the 1980s.

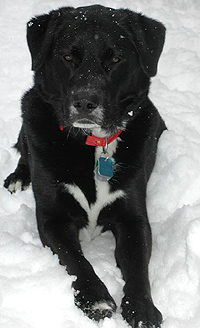
Modern-day Labrador Retriever mixes, such as this one from Atlantic Canada, may show their genetic ancestry through the manifestation of the tuxedo coat pattern of the St. John's water dog.

The St. John's water dog, also known as the St. John's dog or the lesser Newfoundland, is an extinct landrace of domestic dog from Newfoundland. Little is known of the types that went into its genetic makeup, although it was probably a random-bred mix of old English, Irish and Portuguese working dogs. They were favourite dogs of fishermen because they had extraordinary qualities like good temperament and working behaviour. The number of St. John's water dogs started declining by the beginning of the 20th century. By the early 1980s, the landrace was extinct.

During the 19th and early 20th centuries, St. John's water dogs were exported from Newfoundland to England. These dogs were crossbred with other dogs to create the retrievers. It was the ancestor of the modern retrievers, including the Flat-Coated Retriever, Curly-Coated Retriever, the Chesapeake Bay Retriever, the Golden Retriever, and the Labrador Retriever. The St. John's water dog was also an ancestor to the large and gentle Newfoundland, probably through breeding with Rafeiro do Alentejos brought to the island by the generations of Portuguese fishermen who had been fishing offshore since the 15th century.

== Appearance ==
The St. John's breed were called "water dogs" because of their love for water and their coat, which was water-resistant. St. John's water dogs were medium-sized, strong, and stocky – more closely resembling modern Show Labradors than Field Labradors. They had characteristic white patches on the chest, chin, feet, and muzzle. This colouration occasionally manifests in modern Labs as a small white chest patch – known as a "medallion" – or as a few stray white hairs on the feet. The classic tuxedo markings of the St. John's water dog commonly manifest in Labrador Retriever mixes.

Writings as early as the 17th century mention hardy medium-sized black dogs that accompanied Newfoundland fishermen in their boats, and retrieved distant lines or nets of fish, hauling them back to the boat. The dogs were described as having a short thick coat, rudder-like tail, high endurance, and a great love of swimming.

== History ==
| Year (AD) | Event |
|---|---|
| <1790 | Although people had been living on Newfoundland for several centuries, there were no recorded instances of dogs. |
| 1790 | Bewick's "Newfoundland" was based on a single dog in Eslington. It may have been a St. John's dog or Newfoundland interbred with other dogs before coming to England; it may also have been an accurate representation of the Newfoundland landrace. Some debate what the naturally occurring colours of the Newfoundlands were on the island and how well early accounts differentiated the two breeds. Thomas Bewick, a woodcarver, creates the earliest depiction of a “Newfoundland dog” (possibly not a modern-day Newfoundland). If the dog is indeed from Newfoundland, it indicates that the St. John's breed had formed by this point (as Newfoundlands are thought to be descendants of the St. John’s dog). The description reads: "The drawing of this dog was taken for a very fine one at Eslington, in the county of Northumberland. Its dimensions were as follow: From its nose to the end of its tail, it measured six feet two inches; the length of its tail, one foot ten inches; girt behind the shoulder, three feet two inches; round its head over its ears, two feet; round the upper part of his fore leg, nine inches and a half. It was web-footed, could swim extremely fast, dive with great ease, and bring up any thing from the bottom of the water. It was naturally fond of fish and ate raw trouts, or other small fish, out of the nets. This breed of dogs was originally brought from the country of which they bear the name, where their great strength and docility render them extremely useful to the settlers on those coasts, who use them in bringing down wood from the interior parts of the country to the sea side. Three or four of them, yoked to a sledge, will draw two or three hundred weight of wood piled upon it, for several miles, with great ease. They are not attended with a driver, nor any person to guide them; but after having delivered their loading, they return immediately to the woods, where they are accustomed to be fed with dried fish, &c.” |
| 1803 | William Taplin’s The Sportsman’s Cabinet depicts what appears to be a Newfoundland dog (thought to be descended from St. John's dogs). |
| 1809 | An English ship carrying two St. John's puppies shipwrecks off the coast of Maryland. There is a black female and a red male who mix with local dogs. These later form the Chesapeake Bay Retriever. |
| 1814 | Col. Peter Hawker publishes Instructions to Young Sportsmen. Hawker divides dogs from Newfoundland into three categories: a giant "Labrador" breed; what he calls the "true Newfoundland" (St. John's breed); and a big, shaggy breed sold as a pet. St. John's is described as a medium-large dog that is smooth-coated. He describes the giant Labrador as long-haired. Hawker was one of the first to refer to a Newfoundland dog as a retriever. |
| 1822 | Explorer W.E. Cormack crossed the island of Newfoundland by foot. In his journal, he wrote "The dogs are admirably trained as retrievers in fowling, and are otherwise useful.....The smooth or short haired dog is preferred because in frosty weather the long haired kind become encumbered with ice on coming out of the water." |
| 1830 | An early report by a Colonel Hawker described the dog as "by far the best for any kind of shooting. He is generally black and no bigger than a Pointer, very fine in legs, with short, smooth hair and does not carry his tail so much curled as the other; is extremely quick, running, swimming and fighting....and their sense of smell is hardly to be credited...." |
| 1839-1840 | In his book, Excursions In and About Newfoundland During the Years 1839 and 1840 Vol. 1, the geologist Joseph Beete Jukes describes the St. John's water dog with both bemusement and admiration: "A thin, short-haired, black dog came off-shore to us to-day. The animal was of a breed very different from what we understand by the term Newfoundland dog in England. He had a thin, tapering snout, a long thin tail, and rather thin, but powerful legs, with a lank body, – the hair short and smooth." wrote Jukes. "These are the most abundant dogs in the country...They are no means handsome, but are generally more intelligent and useful than the others... I observed he once or twice put his foot in the water and paddled it about. This foot was white, and Harvey said he did it to 'toil' or entice the fish. The whole proceeding struck me as remarkable, more especially as they said he had never been taught anything of the kind." |
| 1842 | Sir Richard Henry Bonnycastle publishes Newfoundland in 1842. "They are of two kinds; the short, wiry-haired Labrador dog, and the long, curly-haired Newfoundland species, generally black, with a white cross upon the breast. The common dogs used in the catamarans are of every possible cross with these, and are of every variety of colour and fur". |
| 1872 | Stonehenge publishes The Dogs of the British Islands, Being a Series of Articles and Letters by Various Contributors, Reprinted from the “Field” Newspaper. "We have seen first-class dogs smooth-coated, wavy-coated, and curly. One smooth dog, two flat-coated or small Labrador, two curly-coated dogs and one bitch, all belonging to personal friends, we have never seen excelled; and a dog by a Clumber spaniel out of a Labrador bitch is one of the very best dogs to find and bring game or wildfowl that we have ever seen (pg. 91)." "THE ST. JOHN’S, SMALL LABRADOR, OR LESSER NEWFOUNDLAND. This dog is known by his smooth, though slightly wavy and glossy coat, being the foundation of the wavy-coated retriever already alluded to (page 89). He is much smaller than the Newfoundland proper, seldom exceeding 25in. or 26in. in height. In other respects there is little difference (pg 171)". |
| 1847 | Irish dog expert, H.D. Richardson, describes three types of Newfoundland dogs in Dogs: Their Origin and Varieties. This includes the Labrador spaniel/Lesser Labrador dog: "This dog presents an appearance intermediate between the Newfoundland dog and the Land Spaniel; he is generally called by the above name, but whether or not he is fully entitled to it, is in my judgment at least questionable. These dogs are remarkable for their diving powers. I saw one some years ago with an officer, who was quartered at Portobello Barracks, Dublin, which dived repeatedly to the bottom of the canal, between the lochs, when full of water, and fetched up such stones, &c., as were thrown in." |
| 1980s | Last surviving St. John's dogs photographed. |

== Extinction ==
The St. John's water dog was made extinct in its homeland by a combination of two factors. In an attempt to encourage sheep raising, heavy restrictions and taxes were placed on dog ownership during the 19th century. Their main overseas destination, the UK, imposed a rigorous long-term quarantine on all imported animals, especially dogs (1885) as part of the eradication of rabies. However, in both Newfoundland and the Maritime provinces, there are still large black mixed-breed dogs with many characteristics of the original St. John's water dog.

The last two known St. John's water dogs were photographed in the early 1980s (in old age) having survived in a "very remote area", but both were male, bringing the era of the St. John's water dog to an end.

In the 1970s, Canadian author Farley Mowat had tried to save them by crossing his St. John's water dog, named "Albert", with a Labrador Retriever. Four puppies resulted, and all had the distinctive white markings of their sire. Two puppies died; the other two were given away, one to Canadian prime minister Pierre Trudeau and the other to Soviet Premier Alexei Kosygin. In 1970, Mowat and Albert appeared in an episode of the CBC series Telescope. The episode includes Mowat telling a bedtime story to his dog.
