= Unified Fire Authority =

Coordinates: 40.697°N 111.918°W

Unified Fire Authority of Greater Salt Lake

Operational area
- Country: United States
- State: Utah
- County: Salt Lake

Agency overview
- Established: November 21, 1921
- Employees: 650 (2017)
- Annual budget: $76,439,636 (2021)
- Staffing: Career & Paid Call
- Fire chief: Dominic Burchett
- EMS level: ALS
- IAFF: 1696

Facilities and equipment
- Battalions: 3
- Stations: 25
- Engines: 17
- Trucks: 3
- Tillers: 5
- Rescues: 2
- Ambulances: 21
- Tenders: 3
- HAZMAT: 2
- USAR: 1
- Wildland: 2 - Type 3; 12 - Type 6 (Aux)
- Light and air: 1

Website
- Official website
- IAFF website

The Unified Fire Authority of Greater Salt Lake provides fire protection and emergency medical services for the unincorporated Salt Lake County, Utah as well as for 9 cities located within the Salt Lake Metropolitan Area. These cities include Alta, Cottonwood Heights, Eagle Mountain, Herriman, Holladay, Midvale, Riverton and Taylorsville.

== History ==
The Unified Fire Authority got its start on November 21, 1921, when the Salt Lake County Fire Department was formed. Discussions for the formation of a unified department within the Salt Lake Valley began over half a century later in 1998. Salt Lake County Fire had been providing emergency services to several contract cities in addition to the Unincorporated Salt Lake County. These cities wanted to play a more active role in the fire administration. In 2004, the department ceased operation as a County government entity and became the Unified Fire Authority.

== US&R Task Force - UT-TF1 ==
The Unified Fire Authority is the sponsoring agency of Urban Search and Rescue Utah Task Force 1, one of the 28 FEMA Urban Search and Rescue Task Forces in the United States. Managed daily by full-time staff of Unified Fire under the direction of the Federal Emergency Management Agency - Urban Search & Rescue, Response Directorate/Operations Division.

== Stations and apparatus ==
Fire Station Number	City	Engine Company	Ladder Company	Ambulance Units	Special Units	Chief Units	Battalion
101	Millcreek	Engine 101		Ambulance 101		Battalion Chief 11	11
102	Magna	Engine 102			Aux 102		13
103	Herriman	Engine 103			Wildland Duty Officer		12
104	Holladay	Engine 104		Ambulance 204			11
106	Millcreek		Medic Ladder 106	Ambulance 106	Aux 106, Water Tender 106		11
107	Kearns	Engine 107		Medic Ambulance 107	Special Enforcement Division		13
108	Brighton	Engine 108		Ambulance 108	Aux 108		11
109	Kearns		Ladder 109	Ambulance 109			13
110	Cottonwood Heights		Ladder 110	Ambulance 110			13
111	Magna		Ladder 111	Ambulance 111	Aux 111, Water Tender 111		13
112	Millcreek	Engine 112			Aux 112		11
113	Snowbird	Engine 113					11
115	Copperton	Engine 115			Air/Light 115		13
116	Cottonwood Heights	Engine 116		Ambulance 116	Aux 116		11
117	Taylorsville	Engine 117	Ladder 117	Ambulance 217	Heavy Rescue 117		13
118	Taylorsville	Engine 118		Ambulance 118		Battalion Chief 13	13
119	Salt Lake City	Engine 119					11
120	Riverton			Ambulance 120	Wildland Hand Crew	Wildland Division Chief	12
121	Riverton		Ladder 121	Ambulance 121	Heavy Rescue 121	Battalion Chief 12	12
123	Herriman	Engine 123		Ambulance 223			12
124	Riverton	Engine 124			HazMat 124		12
125	Midvale	Engine 125			Aux 125		13
126	Midvale	Engine 126		Ambulance 126	HazMat 126	Operations Chief	13
251	Eagle Mountain (Utah County)	Engine 251		Ambulance 251			12
252	Eagle Mountain (Utah County)		Ladder 252	Ambulance 252			12
