= Zanjeer (dog) =

Detection dog

- Other name: Ginger
- Species: Canis lupus familiaris
- Breed: Labrador Retriever
- Sex: Male
- Born: 7 January 1992
- Died: 16 November 2000 (aged 8); Parel, Mumbai, India
- Employer: Bombay Police (later Mumbai Police)
- Notable role: Detection dog
- Known for: Detection work after 1993 Bombay bombings

Zanjeer (7 January 1992 – 16 November 2000) was a Labrador Retriever who served as a detection dog with the Bombay Police (later Mumbai Police) in Maharashtra state of India. Due to his impeccable service detecting many explosives and other weapons—in particular during the 1993 Bombay bombings—he was honoured with a full state funeral.

== Service ==
Zanjeer was trained at the Dog Training Centre of the Criminal Investigation Department at Shivaji Nagar in Pune, India. He joined the Bombay Police Bomb Detection and Disposal Squad on 29 December 1992 and was handled by Ganesh Andale and V G Rajput. The name Zanjeer comes from the 1973 Hindi film Zanjeer but he was also called "Ginger" because of his coat colour. Not including his contributions during the 1993 attacks, Zanjeer helped to recover 11 military bombs, 57 country-made bombs, 175 petrol bombs, and 600 detonators.

== 1993 attacks ==
During the time of the 1993 Bombay bombings in March, Zanjeer helped avert at least three more attacks in Bombay, Mumbra, and Thane. The first incident happened on 15 March 1993 when Zanjeer alerted his handlers to a scooter bomb on Dhanji Street that contained RDX explosives and gelatin sticks. He was then called to the scene of ten unclaimed suitcases outside the Siddhivinayak Temple where the dog detected three Type 56 rifles, five 9-mm pistols, and 200 grenades marked "Arges 69". Days later, Zanjeer investigated two suitcases at the Zaveri Bazaar that contained nine Type 56 rifles.

== Death ==
Zanjeer developed bone cancer and died on 16 November 2000 as a result. He was buried with full state honours.

== See also ==
- List of individual dogs
- List of Labrador Retrievers
