= Urban Search and Rescue Utah Task Force 1 =

UT-TF1 patch

Urban Search and Rescue Utah Task Force 1 (UT-TF 1) is one of 28 Federal Emergency Management Agency (FEMA) Urban Search & Rescue Task Forces in the United States. The task force is based in Salt Lake City, Utah and is managed by the Unified Fire Authority.

UT-TF 1 was deployed to the World Trade Center on September 11, 2001, Hurricane Katrina site in 2005, 2013 Colorado floods in September 2013, Hurricane Harvey in August 2017 and numerous other federal and local responses.

== US&R Incident Support Team (IST) ==
UT-TF 1 membership holds rostered positions on the FEMA US&R IST. This overhead team, the National Urban Search and Rescue (US&R) Incident Support Team (IST) provides a group of highly qualified specialists readily available for rapid assembly and deployment to a disaster area. The IST furnishes Federal, State, and local officials with technical assistance in acquiring and using US&R resources. It provides advice, incident command assistance, management and coordination of US&R task forces, and US&R logistics support.
