= Labrador Retriever =

British breed of retriever gun dog

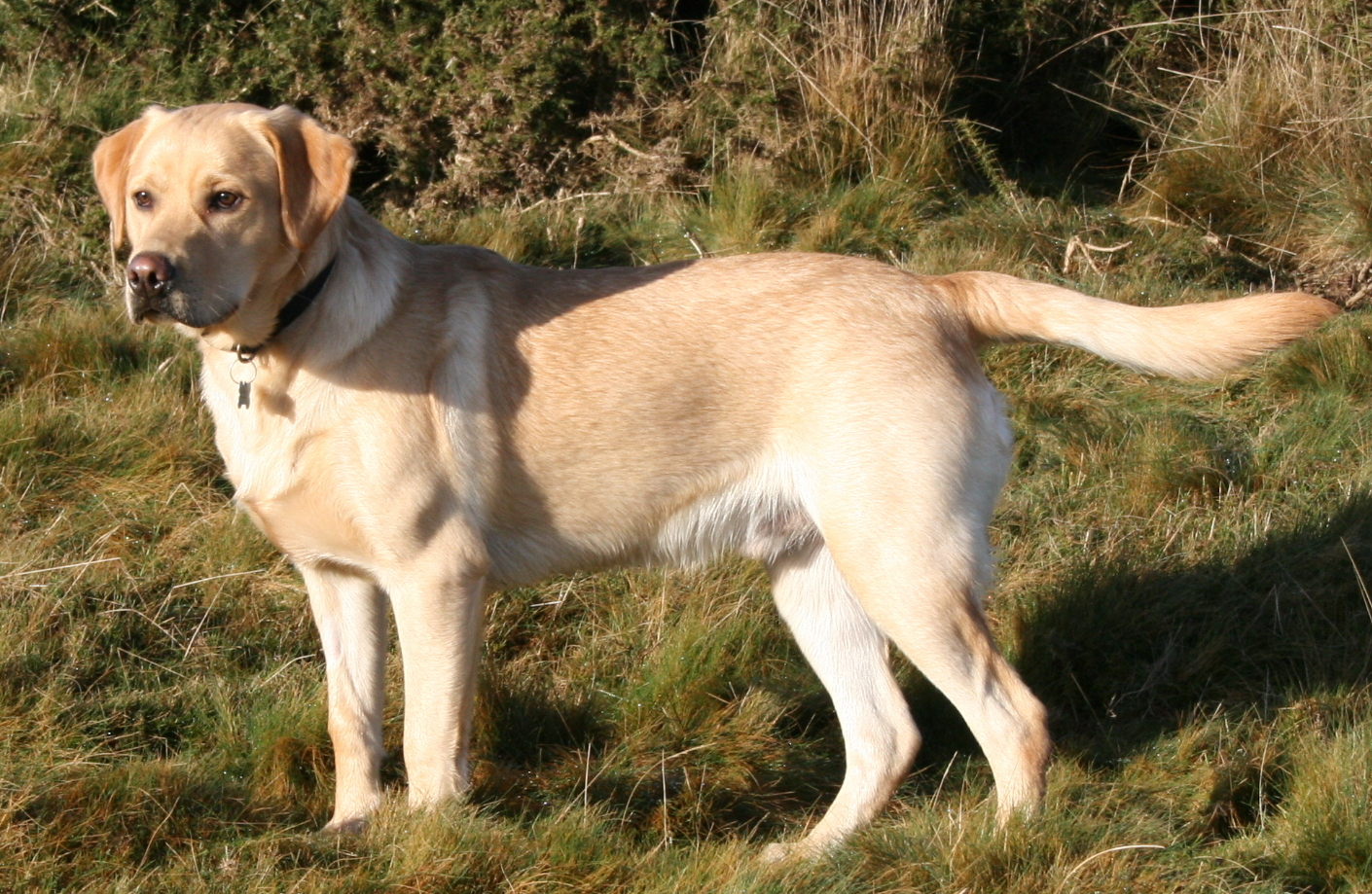
- Adult male
- Other names: Labrador
- Common nicknames: Lab
- Origin: United Kingdom
- Foundation stock: St. John's water dog
Traits
Height	Males	56–57 cm (22–22.5 in)
	Females	54–56 cm (21.5–22 in)
Weight	Males	29–36 kg (65–80 lb)
	Females	25–32 kg (55–70 lb)
- Coat: short, dense, weather-resistant double coat
- Colour: black, chocolate, or yellow (ranges from pale yellow to fox red)
Kennel club standards
- The Kennel Club: standard
- Fédération Cynologique Internationale: standard

The Labrador Retriever, also known simply as the Labrador or Lab, is a British breed of retriever gun dog. It was developed in the United Kingdom from St. John's water dogs imported from the Colony of Newfoundland, and was named after the Labrador region in that colony. It is among the most commonly kept dogs in several countries, particularly in the Western world.

Labradors are often friendly, energetic and playful. It was bred as a sporting and hunting dog, but is widely kept as a companion dog. Though content as a companion, these dogs are intelligent and require both physical and mental stimulation. It may also be trained as a guide or assistance dog, or for rescue or therapy work.

In the 1830s the 10th Earl of Home and his nephews, the 5th Duke of Buccleuch and Lord John Scott, imported progenitors of the breed from Newfoundland to Europe for use as gun dogs. Another early advocate of these Newfoundland fishing dogs was the 2nd Earl of Malmesbury, who bred them for their expertise in waterfowling.

During the 1880s the 3rd Earl of Malmesbury, the 6th Duke of Buccleuch and the 12th Earl of Home collaborated to develop and establish the Labrador Retriever breed. The dogs Buccleuch Avon and Buccleuch Ned, given by Malmesbury to Buccleuch, were mated with bitches carrying blood from those originally imported by the 5th Duke and the 10th Earl of Home. The offspring are the ancestors of all modern Labradors.

== History ==
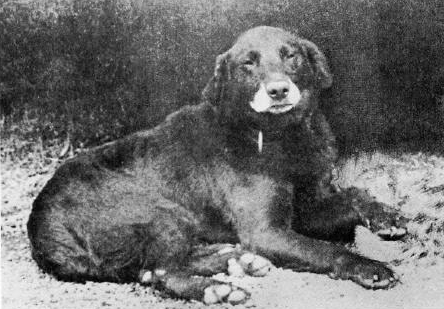
Buccleuch Avon, whelped in 1885

The Labrador breed dates back to at least the 1830s, when St John's water dogs bred by European settlers in Newfoundland were first introduced to Britain from ships trading between Canada and Poole in Dorset. These were then bred with British hunting dogs to create what became known as the Labrador Retriever. Its early patrons included the Earl of Malmesbury, the Duke of Buccleuch, the Earl of Home and Sir John Scott. Early writers have confused the Labrador with the much larger Newfoundland and the Lesser Newfoundland, with Charles William George St John even referring to the Lesser Newfoundland as the Newfoundland. Colonel Peter Hawker describes the first Labrador as being not larger than an English Pointer, more often black than other colours, long in its head and nose with a deep chest, fine legs, and short and smooth coat, and did not carry its tail as highly as the Newfoundland. Hawker distinguishes the Newfoundland from both the "proper Labrador" and St John's breed of these dogs in the fifth edition of his book Instructions to Young Sportsmen, published in 1846.

By 1870 the name Labrador Retriever had become common in England. The liver (now usually called chocolate) Labrador emerged in the late 1800s, with liver-coloured pups documented at the Buccleuch kennels in 1892; the first yellow Labrador on record was born in 1899 (Ben of Hyde, kennels of Major C.J. Radclyffe). The breed was recognised by the Kennel Club in 1903. The first American Kennel Club (AKC) registration was in 1917.

== Characteristics ==
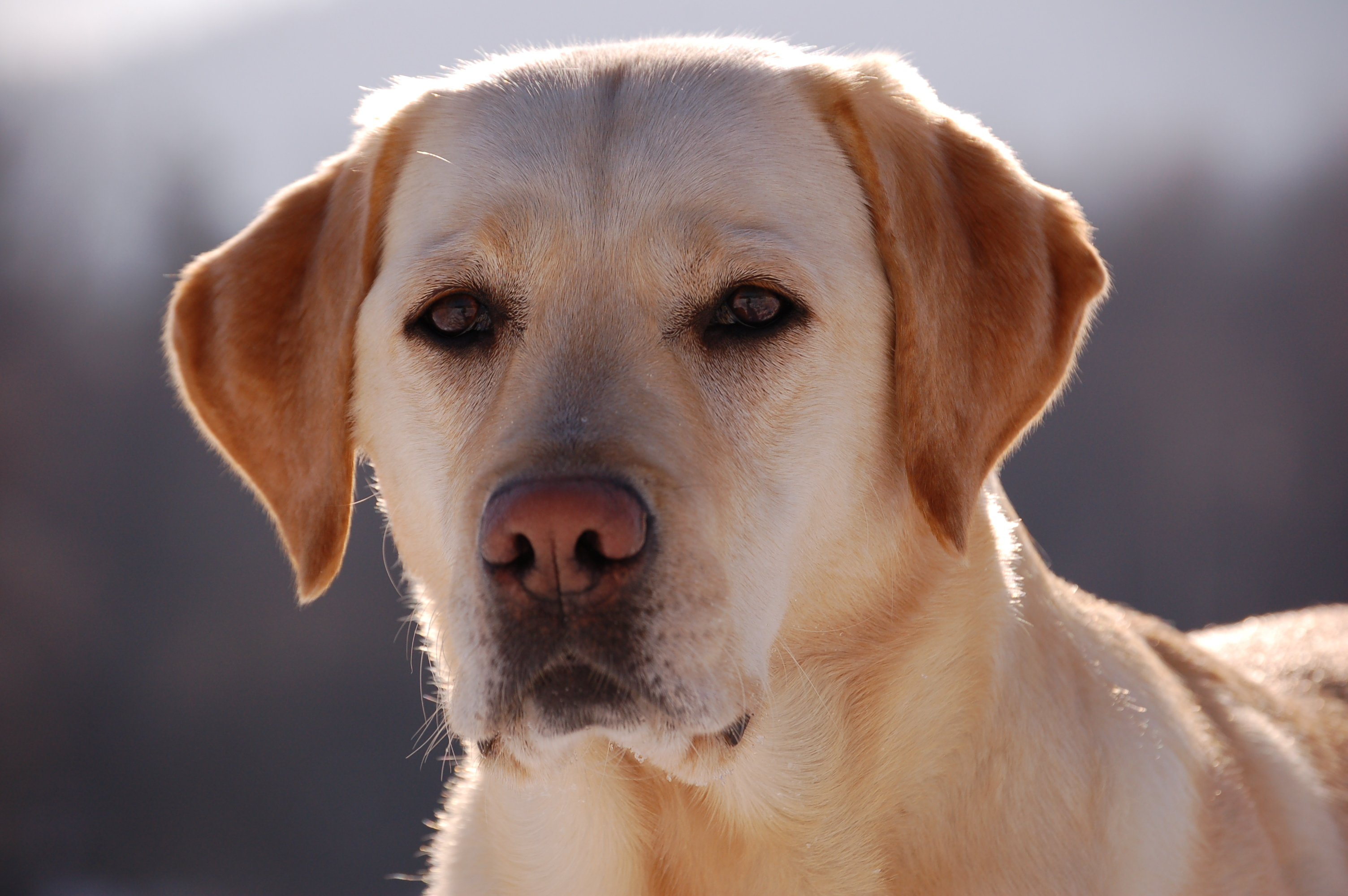
The head is broad with a pronounced stop.

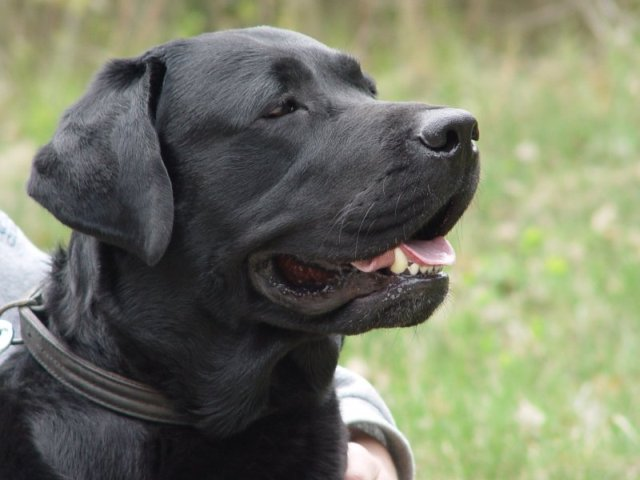
Black

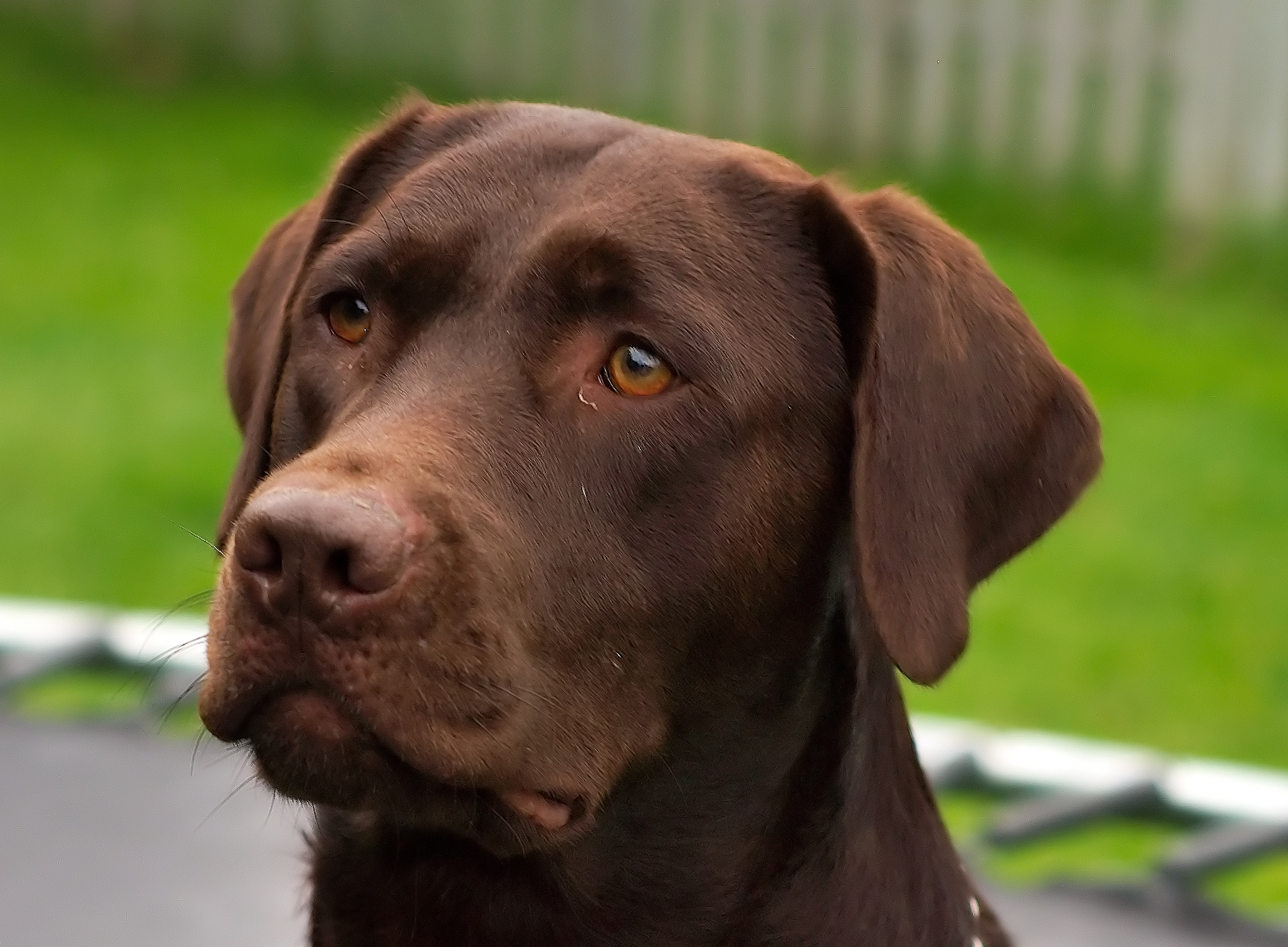
Chocolate

There is a great deal of variety among Labradors. The following characteristics are typical of the conformation show bred (bench-bred) lines of this breed in the United States and are based on the American Kennel Club standard. Significant differences between UK and US standards are noted.

- Size: Labradors are a medium-large breed. They should be as long from the withers to the base of the tail as they are from the floor to the withers. The AKC standard includes an ideal weight for dogs of 25–36 kg (55–80 lb) and for bitches as 25–32 kg (55–70 lb). The guidelines for height vary between the AKC, which gives 55 to 62 centimetres (21.5 to 24.5 in) for dogs and 55 to 60 centimetres (21.5 to 23.5 in) for bitches, The Kennel Club which advises that dogs should be 56 to 57 centimetres (22 to 22.5 in) with bitches between 55 and 56 centimetres (21.5 and 22 in), and the FCI which quotes a range of 56 to 57 centimetres (22 to 22.5 in) for dogs with bitches ideal at 54 to 56 centimetres (21.5 to 22 in).
- Coat: The Labrador Retriever's coat should be short and dense, but not wiry. The coat is water-resistant, so the dog does not get cold when taking to the water in the winter. That means that the dog naturally has a slightly dry, oily coat. Acceptable colours are black, yellow, and chocolate.
- Head: The head should be broad with slightly pronounced eyebrows. The eyes should be kind and expressive. Appropriate eye colours are brown and hazel. The lining around the eyes should be black. The ears should hang close to the head and be set slightly above the eyes.
- Jaws: The jaws should be strong and powerful. The muzzle should be of medium length and should not be too tapered. The jaws should hang slightly and curve gracefully back.
- Body: The body should have a powerful and muscular build.

The tail and coat are designated "distinctive [or distinguishing] features" of the Labrador by both the Kennel Club and AKC. The AKC adds that the "true Labrador Retriever temperament is as much a hallmark of the breed as the 'otter' tail."

=== Color ===
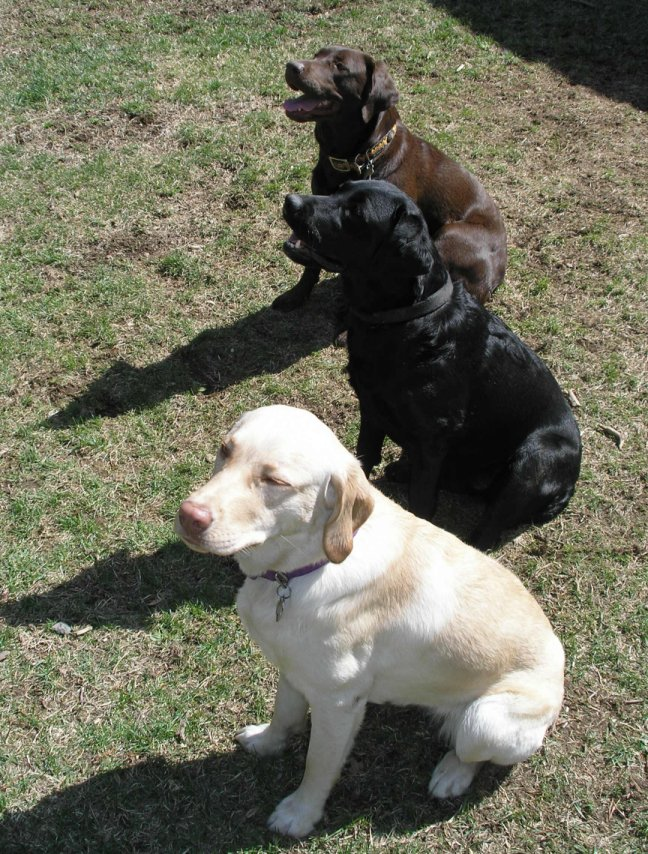
The three color varieties, from front to back: yellow, black, and chocolate

Labradors are registered in three colours: solid black, yellow (anything from creamy white to fox-red), and chocolate (medium to dark brown; originally called "liver").

Puppies of all colours can occur in the same litter. Coat color is determined primarily by three genes, called MC1R, Agouti, and CBD103. If a dog carries wild type alleles at all three loci, the dog will have a yellow coat. If a dog has a loss-of-function mutation at MC1R, it will also have a yellow coat, regardless of the genotypes at the other two loci. Dogs carrying wild-type alleles for MC1R and Agouti, together with the black allele of CBD103, will have a black coat. (Note: "Production of yellow versus black pigment in dogs is controlled by three genes: MC1R, Agouti, and CBD103. Dogs carrying wild-type alleles for all three genes have a yellow coat resulting from Agouti antagonism of MC1R signaling in melanocytes (yellow Great Dane, top). Dogs carrying a loss-of-function mutation at MC1R have a yellow coat, regardless of their genotype at Agouti or CBD103 (yellow Labrador retriever, middle). Dogs carrying wild-type alleles for MC1R and Agouti, together with the dominant black allele of CBD103 (KB) have a black coat resulting from the interaction between a β-defensin and MC1R (black Curly Coated Retriever bottom)." — Candille, Kaelin, et al. (2007))

According to a 2011 study, 13 out of 245 Labradors studied were heterozygous for the M264V mutation responsible for the melanistic mask, and one was homozygous. Within this breed, the trait cannot be determined simply by appearance.

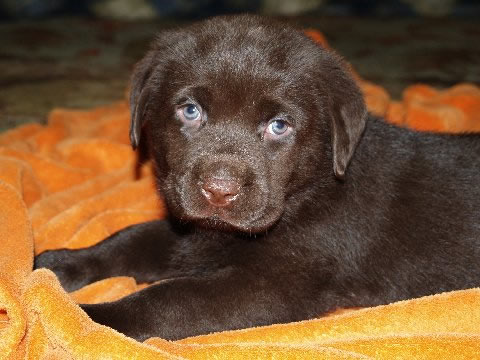
The most common places where pigmentation is visible are the nose, lips, gums, and the rims of the eyes.

=== Show and field lines ===
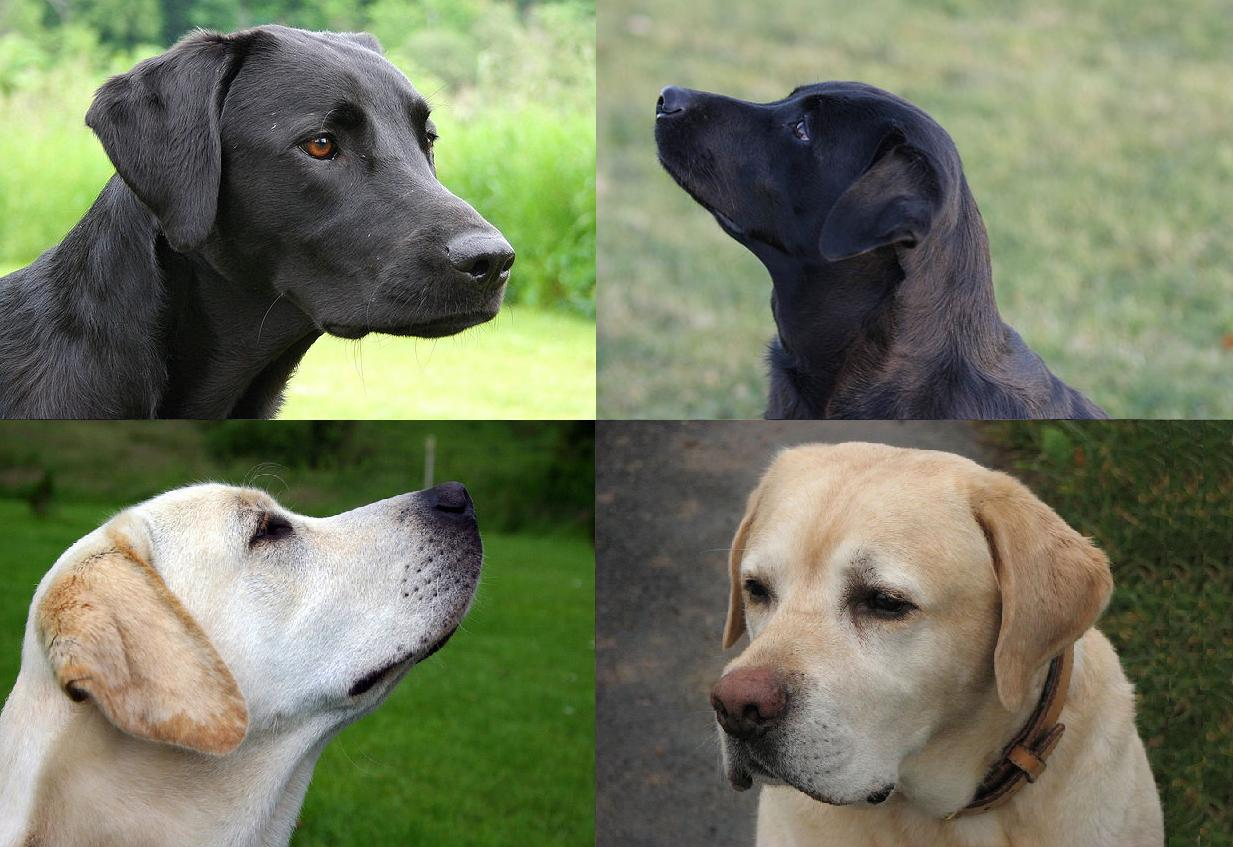
Head and muzzle appearance: field (left), and show (right), showing the shorter muzzle length, more solid appearance of the head, and "pronounced" stop of the latter

As a result of specialised breeding, there are significant differences between field and trial-bred and show-bred lines of Labradors. In the United States, the former are sometimes mistakenly referred to as "American" and the latter as "English". In fact, both field and show types are bred in both countries and all Labrador Retrievers are descended from British lines.

== Health ==
Labrador Retrievers have a predisposition to chronic hepatitis. One UK study found a 4.14 odds ratio. Some studies report a predisposition for Labrador Retriever bitches. The reason for the predisposition is unknown. Ideas proposed include it being hereditary or environmental. The Labrador Retriever also shows a predisposition to other hepatobiliary diseases, including: reactive hepatitis, nodular hyperplasia, and gall bladder disease.

A UK study found the breed's average life expectancy to be 13.1 years. A joint study by the Royal Veterinary College study and the University of Sydney concluded that chocolate-coloured Labradors have a shorter average life expectancy than other colours of Labrador (by about 10%) and are more likely to suffer some health problems. A 2024 Italian study found a life expectancy of 11 years for the breed compared to 10 years overall. A 2005 Swedish study of insurance data found that 25% of Labrador Retrievers died by the age of 10, less than the overall rate of 35% of dogs dying by the age of 10.

Labradors are somewhat prone to hip and elbow dysplasia, especially in larger dogs. Eye diseases may include progressive retinal atrophy, cataracts, corneal dystrophy and retinal dysplasia. They can suffer from exercise induced collapse, which causes hyperthermia, weakness, collapse, and disorientation after short bouts of exercise, or from obesity, which in some cases may be partly due to the absence of part or all of the proopiomelanocortin gene.

The Labrador Retriever is one of the more commonly affected breeds for progressive rod-cone degeneration. An autosomal recessive mutation in the PRCD gene is responsible for the condition in the breed.

== Roles ==
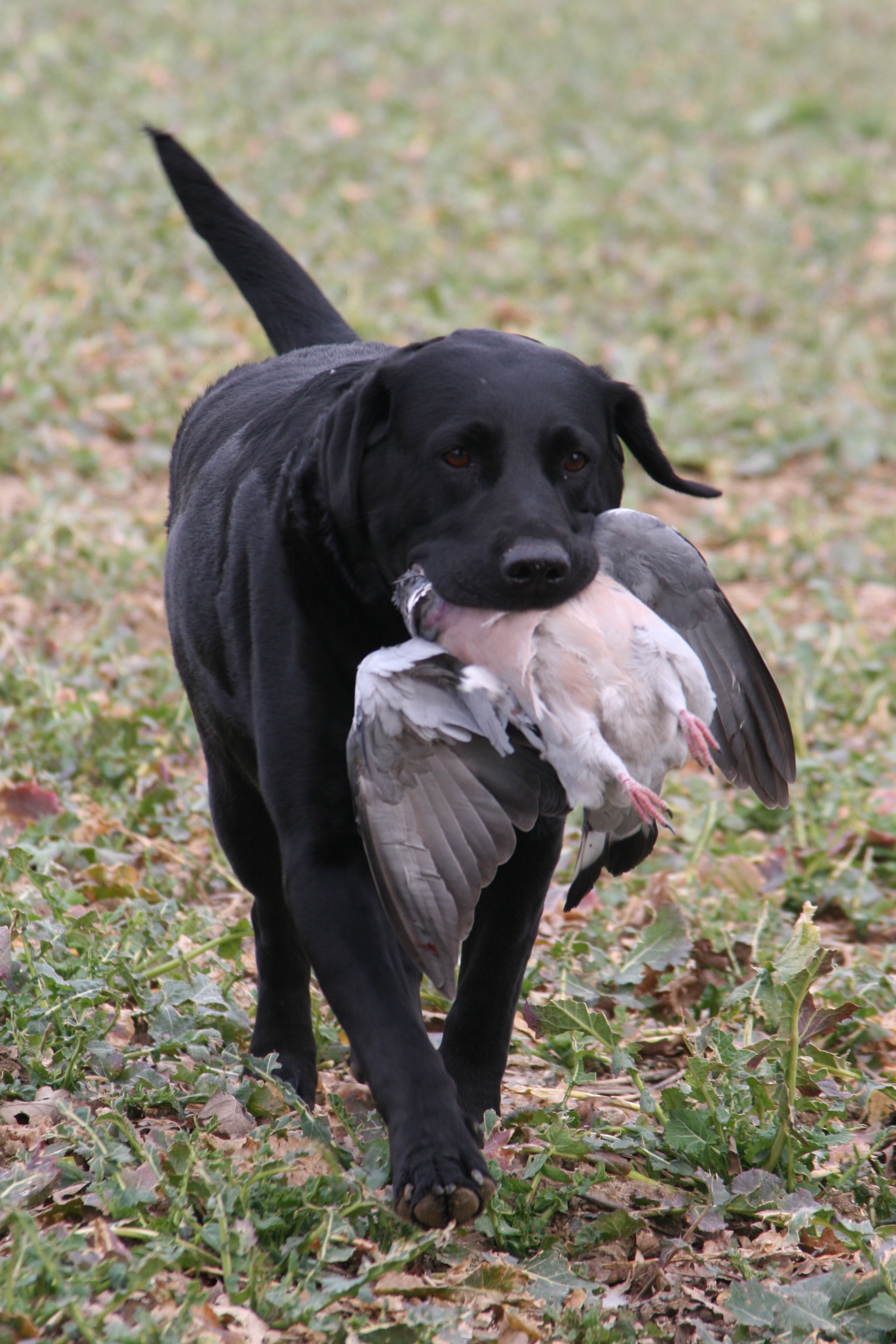
Retrieving shot game, a common wood pigeon

Labrador Retrievers have proven to have a high success rate at becoming guide dogs. A study published in 2006, tested the suitability of four different breeds (Labrador Retriever, Golden Retriever, Labrador Retriever/Golden Retriever Mix, and German Shepherds) as guide dogs. In this experiment, German Shepherds had the highest chance of not completing it. Labrador Retrievers and the Labrador Retriever/Golden Retriever Crossbreeds had the highest success rate. However, German Shepherds and Golden Retrievers had a higher success rate after going through longer training than the training required for Labrador Retrievers.

The Labrador Retriever is a gun dog bred to retrieve on land and water. As a dog specially bred for water retrieving, the Labrador has developed various traits for this job. For retrieving the Labrador Retriever has a soft mouth, a trait which allows it to carry game and waterfowl without damaging it. For swimming, the Labrador is aided by fully webbed paws, an otter-like tail, and a waterproof coat.

The high intelligence, initiative and self-direction of Labradors in working roles is exemplified by dogs such as Endal, who was trained to, if need be, put his human who uses a wheelchair in the recovery position, cover him with a blanket, and activate an emergency phone. A number of Labradors have also been taught to assist their owner in removing money and credit cards from ATMs with prior training. The breed is used in water rescue/lifesaving. It continues in that role today, along with the Leonberger, Newfoundland, and Golden Retriever dogs; they are used at the Italian School of Canine Lifeguard.

=== In war ===
Labradors have been used as war dogs.

- World War II: Labradors were trained for tasks such as bomb detection and handling dangerous situations.
- Vietnam War: Labradors served as tracker dogs, alerting handlers to snipers, tripwires and weapons caches. Their training enabled them to locate injured enemies, missing personnel or enemy positions.
- Modern military use: Labradors continue to serve in roles such as bomb detection and search and rescue operations. Their calm demeanor and adaptability make them suitable for various military tasks.

== Demography ==
The Labrador is an exceptionally popular dog. As of 2006, it was widely considered one of the most popular dog breeds, and it is the most popular dog by ownership in Canada, New Zealand and the United Kingdom. In 2006, in both the United Kingdom and the United States, there were well over twice as many registered Labradors as the next most popular breed. If the comparison is limited to dog breeds of a similar size, then there are around 3–5 times as many Labradors registered in both countries as the next most popular breeds, the German Shepherd and the Golden Retriever.

Labs are the most popular breed of assistance dog in the United States, Australia and many other countries, as well as being widely used by police and other official bodies for their detection and working abilities. Approximately 60–70% of all guide dogs in the United States are Labradors.

In 2022 Labrador Retrievers were the second-most-popular breed in the United States. In 2020 the Labrador was the most popular registered dog breed in New Zealand. Seven out of the 13 "outstanding gundogs" of the Australian National Kennel Council's 2000–2005 appointees to its 'hall of fame' are Labradors.

== Famous Labradors ==
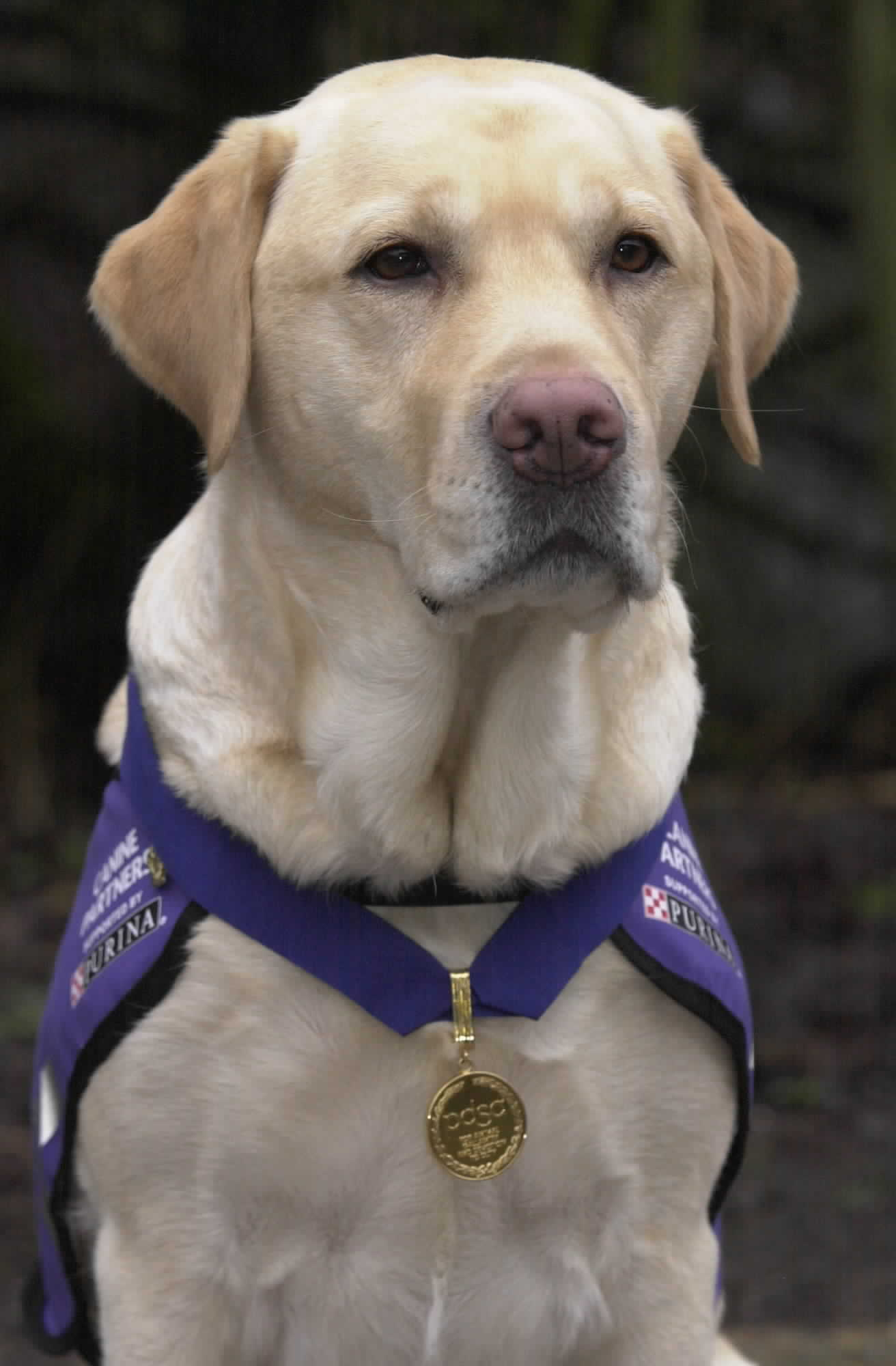
Endal wearing his PDSA Gold Medal

Notable Labradors within various categories include:

=== Assistance dogs ===
- Endal was a service dog in Britain. Among other distinctions, "the most decorated dog in the world" (including "Dog of the Millennium" and the PDSA's Gold Medal for Animal Gallantry and Devotion to Duty), the first dog to ride on the London Eye and the first dog known to work a 'chip and pin' ATM card. By Endal's death in March 2009, he and his owner/handler Allen Parton had been filmed almost 350 times by crews from several countries, and a film of a year in Endal's life was in production.
- Sully, was a service dog of President George H. W. Bush during the last six months of Bush's life, and noted for his role in Bush's funeral. A form of Parkinson's disease confined the former president to a wheelchair or motorised scooter in the final years of his life. Among the services that Sully was able to perform for Bush were retrieving dropped items, opening and closing doors, pushing an emergency button, and supporting him when standing.

=== Police, military, rescue and detection dogs ===
- Frida (12 April 2009 – 15 November 2022) was a yellow Labrador Retriever who worked as a search and rescue dog for the Mexican Navy (SEMAR). She was deployed to help the rescue efforts in the aftermath of natural disasters.
- Zanjeer ("Chain", or "Shackles"), a detection dog who detected arms and ammunition used in the 1993 Mumbai (Bombay) serial explosions. During his service, he helped recover 57 country-made bombs, 175 petrol bombs, 11 military-grade armaments, 242 grenades and 600 detonators. His biggest contribution to the police force and the city was the detection of 3,329 kg of RDX. He also helped to detect 18 Type 56 rifles and five 9 mm pistols.
- Lucky and Flo, twin Black Labrador counterfeit-detection dogs who became famous in 2007 for "sniffing out nearly 2 million counterfeit DVDs" on a 6-month secondment to Malaysia in 2007. Following the multimillion-dollar, 6 arrest Malaysian detection, they became the first dogs to be awarded Malaysia's "outstanding service award" and software pirates were stated to have put a £30,000 contract out for their lives.
- Sarbi, an Australian special forces explosives detection dog that spent almost 14 months missing in action (MIA) in Afghanistan before being recovered safe and well in 2009.
- Jake, an American black Labrador who served as a search and rescue dog following the September 11 attacks and Hurricane Katrina.
- Salty and Roselle, awarded the Dickin Medal for conspicuous gallantry or devotion to duty while serving in military conflict. They led their blind owners down more than 70 flights of stairs to escape from the damaged World Trade Center on 11 September 2001
- Sadie, awarded the Dickin Medal for conspicuous gallantry or devotion to duty while serving in military conflict. She detected explosive devices, which were subsequently disarmed, while serving in Kabul, Afghanistan, in November 2005; she served with the Royal Gloucestershire, Berkshire and Wiltshire Regiment
- Sasha, awarded the Dickin Medal for conspicuous gallantry or devotion to duty while serving in military conflict. Located 15 improvised explosive devices, mortars, mines, and weapons while serving in Afghanistan, with the Royal Army Veterinary Corps. In July 2008 Sasha and her handler were killed in a Taliban ambush by a rocket-propelled grenade.

=== Pets ===
- President Bill Clinton's Labradors Buddy and Seamus.
- Russian president Vladimir Putin's Labrador Konni.
- Marley, "The World's Worst Dog", featured in the journalist John Grogan's autobiographical book Marley & Me, adapted into a 2008 comedy drama film of the same name.
- Celine Dion's Labradors Charlie and Bear. They were represented in numerous magazines with her and her family, becoming pets celebrities in their own names.

== Sources ==
- Douglas, James (2003). The Complete Gundog Training Manual. Shrewsbury, UK: Swan Hill Press. ISBN 978-1-904057-05-5.
- Fogle, Bruce (2009). The Encyclopedia of the Dog. New York, NY: DK Publishing. p. 195. ISBN 978-0-7566-6004-8.
- Hancock, David (2013). Gundogs: Their past, their performance and their prospects. Ramsbury, Marlborough, UK: The Crowood Press Ltd. ISBN 978-1-84797-492-1.
- Hudson, David (1995). The Shooting Man's Dog: A complete guide to gundogs. Shrewsbury, UK: Swan Hill Press. pp. 28–32. ISBN 1-85310-560-0.
- Jones, Arthur F.; Hamilton, Ferelith (1971). The World Encyclopedia of Dogs. New York, NY: Galahad Books. pp. 238–243. ISBN 0-88365-302-8.
- "Retriever (Labrador) breed standard". thekennelclub.org.uk. UK: The Kennel Club Ltd. January 2018.
- Kern, Kerry V.; Earle-Bridges, Michele (1995). Labrador Retrievers: Everything about purchase, care, nutrition, diseases, breeding, and behavior. Barron's. p. 9. ISBN 978-0-8120-9018-5 – via Internet Archive (archive.org).
- Morris, Desmond (2001). Dogs: The ultimate dictionary of over 1,000 dog breeds. North Pomfret, VT: Trafalgar Square Publishing. pp. 299–301. ISBN 1-57076-219-8.
