= Pastifício Selmi =

Pastificio Selmi SA
- Native name: Pastifício Selmi
- Company type: Private
- Industry: Food industry
- Founded: 1887; 139 years ago
- Founder: Adolpho Selmi
- Headquarters: Campinas, Brazil
- Area served: 40 countries
- Products: pasta, biscuits, olive oil, flour, grated cheese, coffee, cake mix, others
- Brands: Galo, Renata, Todeschini
- Revenue: R$ 1.7 billion (2023)
- Website: https://pt-br.selmi.com.br

Pastifício Selmi is a multinational company from Campinas. They produce several kinds of food products, including pasta, flour, shredded cheese, cake mix, biscuits, coffee olive oil, flour and wafers, sold for retail companies such as Unilever, Carrefour, Atacadão, Assaí Atacadista, Grupo Pereira and Cristal Alimentos. The company is one of the first pasta factories from São Paulo.

== History ==
=== First years ===
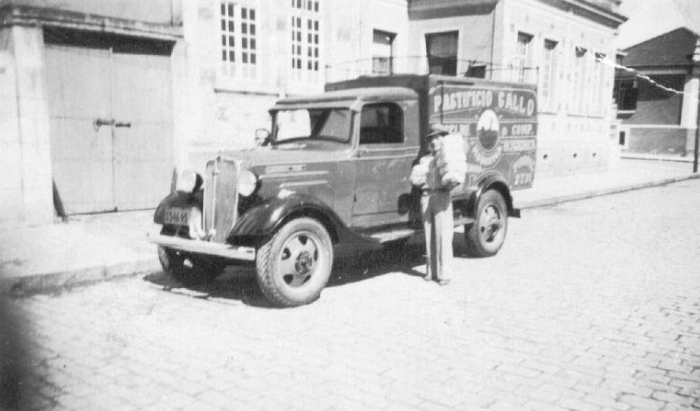
An employee from Selmi selling Gallo pasta

Pastifício Selmi was created as a small pasta factory by the Italian immigrant Adolpho Selmi in 1887, Campinas. Initially, the company sold pasta baskets directly for the houses in Campinas, but soon Adolpho formed a partnership with Hugo Gallo and created the brand "Gallo".

The pasta was initially manually produced, but the production changed to animal traction, steam and then electric dough mixers imported from Italy.

=== Expansion ===
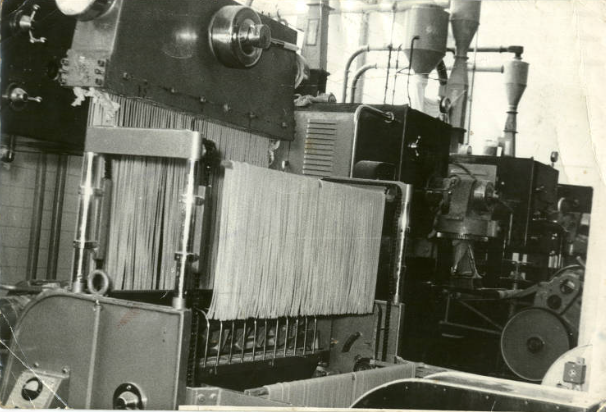
Selmi machinery in 1963

In 1956, Selmi became an anonymous partnership.

In 2005, after the death of his father, Ricardo Selmi, assumed the presidency of the company.

In 2009, Selmi initiated their biscuit and olive oil production. In 2011, Selmi invested R$ 5 million in the marketing campaign for the new segment.

In 2011, Selmi opened a factory in Ipojuca.

In 2012, Selmi pasta price rose between 21% and 25% due several factors, including hail rain in Paraná, decrease of sales, the Dollar price when compared to Real and the economic crisis in Argentina.

In 2020, Selmi profit fell in 35%. In the same year, the company launched two portals for recipes and a virtual assistance to connect the e-commerce and retailers.

In 2021, Selmi invested in the robotization of their factory and the expansion of their industrial park.

In 2022, Selmi was the second biggest pasta producer from Brazil, behind M. Dias Branco. Because of the Russian invasion of Ukraine, their prices rose due low stocks of wheat. In the same year, Selmi started a revenue capitation with a public offer from Agribusiness Receivables Certificates (CRA) aiming for R$ 200 million in six years.

In 2023, Selmi started the operations of their windmill and distribution center in Rolândia. Barbosa Neto (PDT), the mayor of Londrina, was against the construction of the windmill to avoid the company's exit from the city.

In 2024, Selmi amplified their biscuit production in more than 40%.

== Exportations ==
Selmi began selling their products abroad in 2005, but in 2007 their exportations became constant.

In 2009, Selmi closed a partnership during Gulfood in Dubai and started selling their products in countries from the Gulf, such as United Arab Emirates, Saudi Arabia, Iraq, Bahrain, Qatar, Oman, Kuwait and Jordan.

In 2011, Selmi closed a contract with Publix and Winn-Dixie to sell their products in the United States.

In 2023, Selmi operated in 40 countries, including Portugal, Paraguay, Venezuela, Cuba and Angola.

== Brands ==
=== Galo ===
Originally called "Gallo", it was the first brand from Selmi, produced since 1887, when Adolpho Selmi closed a partnership with Hugo Gallo.

Galo brand is used in several products, including whole meal pasta, doughnuts and stuffed cookies.

In 2014, Galo launched a marketing campaign with Edu Guedes. In May 2023, Galo launched "Recipes in the Tip of the Tongue", that displayed pasta recipes made by the consumers.

=== Renata ===
Renata brand was created in 1964 and it is used in several products, including durum wheat pasta, whole meal pasta, organic pasta, capelletti, spaghetti, bow-tie pasta, cavatappi, yakisoba pasta, instant noodles, crystal biscuits, corn starch biscuits, laminated biscuits, marie biscuits, crackers, butter cookies, stuffed cookies, wafers, cake mix, olive oil and wheat flour.

Their biscuits are made with insects instead of fruits. The product is known for their advertisement at TV Globo.

Renata has their own volleyball team, Vôlei Renata, and has partnerships with influencers, such as Sandra Matarazzo and Arno van Enck. Renata also made a partnership with Cartoon Network, with characters from Adventure Time, Powerpuff Girls and Ben 10 appearing on their packing. Other characters that appeared on Renata packing are Baby Shark and the members of the Justice League. Other notorious marketing caimpaigns from Renata were "Faro de Gol", during 2014 World Cup, and their partnership with CNA Idiomas.

=== Todeschini ===
The Todeschini pasta and biscuits brand was produced by Todeschini Alimentos since 1885. In the 2000s, the company was near bankruptcy and licensed their products for Selmi in 2014. In 2021, Selmi bought the brand, and in December 2022 Todeschini Alimentos closed their operations.

According to the company, Todeschini has more competitive prices when compared to Galo and Renata. The brand was reshaped after the acquisition.

=== Knorr ===
On 22 August 2018 Knorr joined the pasta segment when the Administrative Council for Economic Defense approved the company partnership between Unilever and Selmi, where the later became the pasta producer for the brand.

=== Barilla ===
Selmi is one of the companies that distributes the Barilla pasta.

== Controversies ==
=== Quality control ===
In 2014, the Institute for Consumers Defense published a report analyzing the nutritional values from 291 products. Renata cake mix had a discrepancy in values, but according to Selmi, the product was tested as it was in the shelf, not after the cooking process.

In 2017, Proteste published a report about the quality of coffee and flour from famous Brazilian brands. The report found 33 pieces of insects inside of Renata flour.

In 2024, the Institute for Consumers Defense published a report accusing Renata instant noodles of containing glyphosate, glufosinate, pirimiphos-methyl and piperonyl butoxide. Renata was in second place on the list of the "champions of venom". In response, Selmi affirmed that their products follow Anvisa rules for pesticides.

=== Deforestation ===
In 2024, Ricardo Selmi signed a Conduct Adjustment Term agreeing to pay R$ 6,765 million for the deforestation of 1,353 ha from a protected area at Fazenda Marília, on São Félix do Araguaia in 2002.

=== Frozen assets ===
In 2024, Belarmino da Ascenção Marta had R$ 56 million frozen from his assets for buying a bus company in 1990 and liquidating his assets, leaving behind a multimillionaire debt. His son, Belarmino da Ascenção Marta Filho, was a partner from Selmi since 2005, and the company lent money for Belarmino family and companies. In 2017, Belarmino Filho fought with Ricardo Selmi and was expelled, but the justice ordered other accounts linked to Belarmino family to be frozen, possibly affecting Selmi.

=== Bill nº 4679/01 ===
The Bill nº 4679/01, proposed by Aldo Rebelo (PCdoB-SP), proposed the obligatory addition of at least 10% of cassava flour, cassava zest flour or cassava starch flour into the national wheat flour products. Selmi protested, affirming that if the bill was accepted, the company would be obligated to import more wheat flour, thus making the final product more expensive.

== Prizes ==
- Top Pasta (2024)
- Top Pasta (2023)
- Top Pasta (2022)
- Top Pasta (2021)
- Top Pasta (2020)

== On popular culture ==
Galo Pasta is cited on the story "Geléia da Paixão", from the 1977 book O Homem Vermelho, written by Domingos Pellegrini.

== See also ==
- Italian Brazilians
- List of multinational corporations
- List of food companies
