= List of supermarket chains in Brazil =

== List ==
- Carrefour
  - Atacadão
- DIA
- GPA, owned by Groupe Casino
  - Assaí Atacadista
  - Extra
  - Pão de Açúcar
- SHV Holdings
  - Makro (pending sale of stores outside São Paulo state to Carrefour)
- Grupo Big, 80% owned by Advent International, 20% by Walmart
  - Sam's Club
- Jacomar
