= Carrefour Brazil =

Brazilian retail trade company

- Native name: Carrefour Brazil Group
- Type: Public
- Industry: Retail
- Founded: 1975
- Headquarters: São Paulo, SP, Brazil
- Number of locations: 1000+ (2022)
- Area served: Brazil
- Key people: Stéphane Maquaire
- Brands: Carrefour Hyper; Carrefour Express; Carrefour Neighborhood Market; Carrefour Drugstore; Carrefour Gas Station; Atacadão; Supeco; Sam's Club; Bompreço
- Net income: ▼BRL 1.99 billion (2022)
- Total assets: ▲BRL 92.29 billion (2022)
- Owner: Carrefour (67.7%); Península Participações (7.2%); Advent International/Walmart (5.6%); Free float (19.8%)
- Number of employees: 150000+ (2022)
- Website: www.grupocarrefourbrasil.com.br

Atacadão S.A., doing business as Grupo Carrefour Brasil, is a Brazilian retail trade company controlled by the French group with the same name. Owner of several brands that operate under the Carrefour brand and Atacadão, which is considered the largest wholesaler in Brazil. After the acquisition of Bompreço, it became the largest private employer in Brazil. It is considered the largest food retail company in the country, according to the ABRAS Ranking 2022.

== History ==
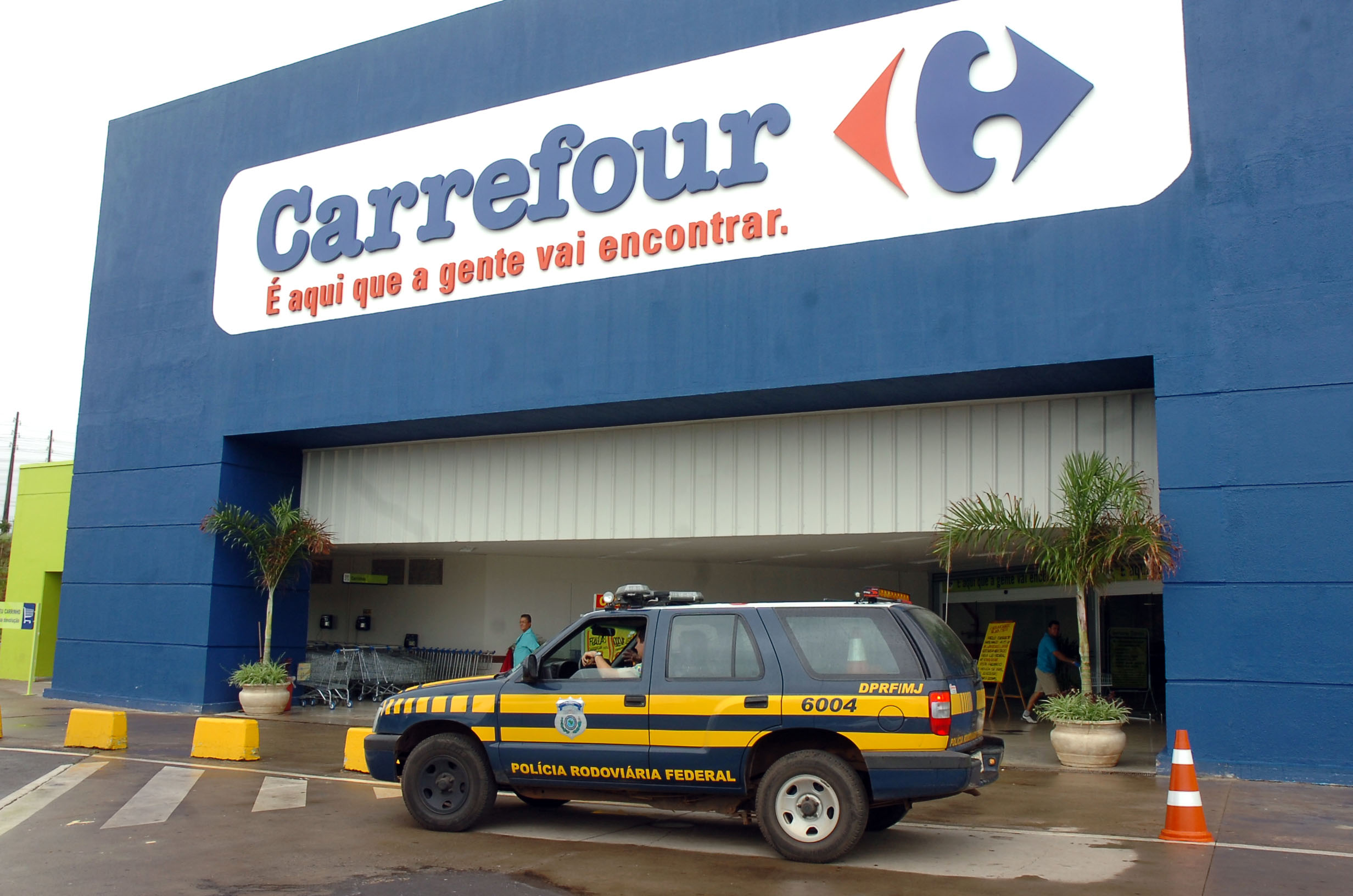
Branch in Brasília, DF

Carrefour's history in Brazil began in 1975 with the opening of the first hypermarket in Brazil located in São Paulo. The following year, the second Carrefour unit was opened in Brazil, now in Barra da Tijuca, in Rio de Janeiro.

Years later, in 1989, Carrefour launched the Carrefour Card, which later became a major method of financing purchases in the group's network of stores. Between 1992 and 1999, Carrefour opened 59 stores throughout Brazil, with an investment of US$ 100 million. In 1993 Carrefour opened the first own-brand Carrefour Post located in Santo André.

In 1997, it acquired 50% of the hypermarket business of the Eldorado group, with 8 stores (7 in São Paulo and another in Campo Grande). The stores were incorporated into the French group's portfolio and cost around R$200 million.

In 1999, with a fierce dispute with Grupo Pão de Açúcar for leadership in the ranking of food retailers in Brazil, the group acquired control of the supermarket chain Planaltão, headquartered in Brasília. At the time, the acquisition was estimated at R$80 million. Planaltão had revenues of R$174.8 million in 1998 and represented an opportunity for growth in the Federal District.

Also in 1999, it acquired other regional chains, such as Roncetti in Espírito Santo and the Dallas, Rainha and Continente chains (both belonging to the Cunha family), in Rio de Janeiro. The acquisition of Rio de Janeiro chains brought 32 new stores to the group's platform. The transaction was estimated to have cost the French around BRL 450 million.

In 2005, the 100th hypermarket store was opened in Brazil, located in the Morumbi neighborhood, in São Paulo. In the same year, Carrefour created Carrefour Bairro, which operated in a supermarket format at first restricted to São Paulo, but later Carrefour Bairro opened stores in Minas Gerais and the Federal District. In the same year, Carrefour created yet another brand of its own, but this time it operated as Drogaria Carrefour, selling medicines and hygiene and beauty products.

In 2006, to continue expanding its business, Carrefour created Linha Viver, a brand of diet, light and organic products sold only in the group's stores. In the same year, Carrefour inaugurated the first hypermarket open 24 hours a day located in Guarujá.

In May 2007, the Banco Central authorized the operation of Banco Carrefour. This company is the successor of Carrefour Gestora de Cartão, the company that managed Carrefour's private label card cards.

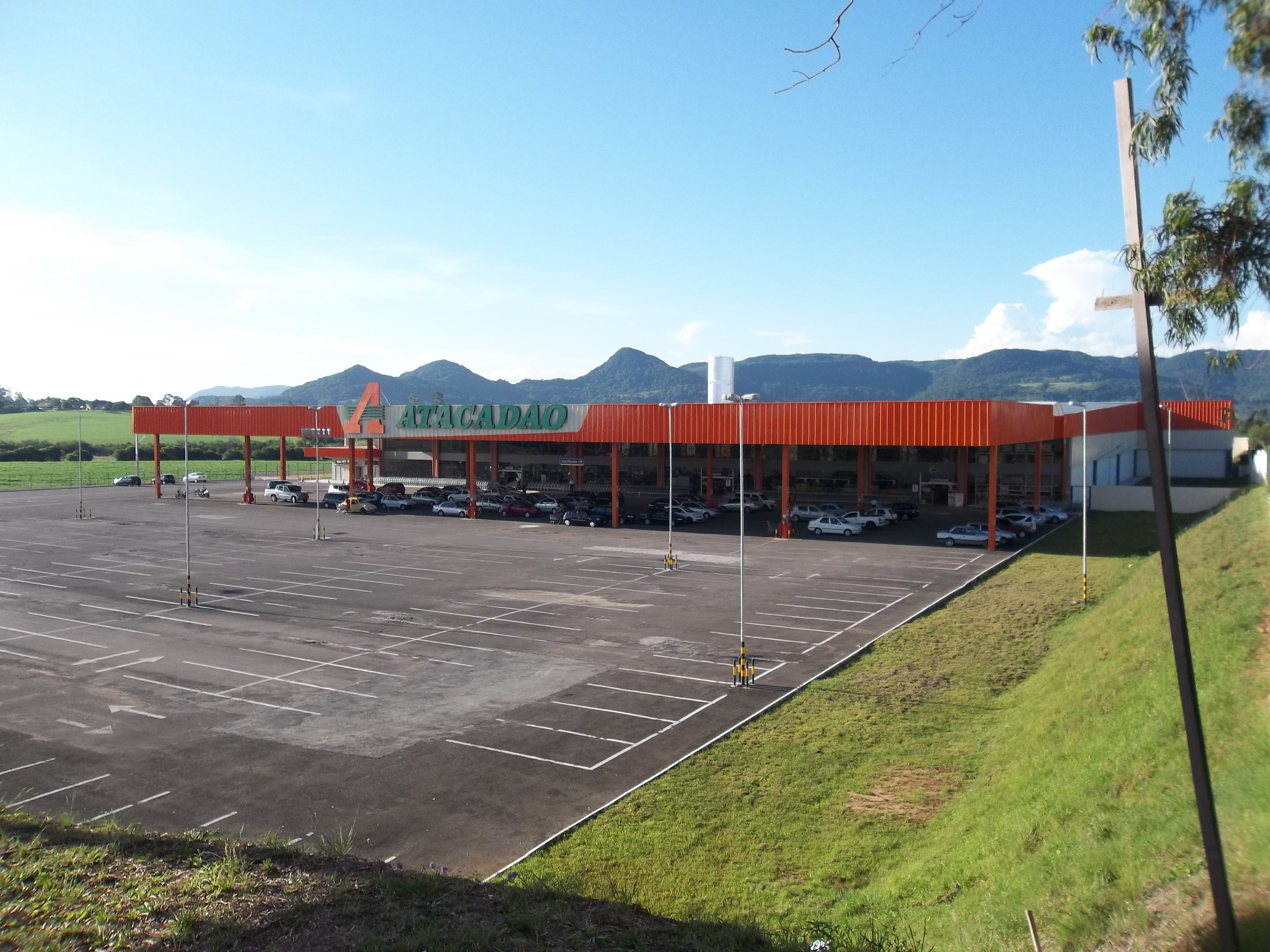
Atacadão from Santa Maria, in Rio Grande do Sul. Supermarket located between São José and Camobi.

In 2007, the then global president of Carrefour, José Luis Duran, would have given an ultimatum to the Brazilian operation. Duran would have said that, if in two years the company's local results did not improve and business did not grow back at the desired speed, Carrefour would withdraw from the country. According to market analysts, the clumsy purchases of the group in regional networks and the lack of integration of brands hampered the progress of Brazilian operations. In addition, the French head office was not very flexible with negotiations with suppliers and even opening and closing stores. Months later, still in 2007, the French chain acquired Atacadão, in a negotiation of R$2.2 billion. Atacadão had 34 stores, 17 of which in the state of São Paulo alone.

In 2011, following the French matrix, the Brazilian branch segregated the hard discount stores Day. In the same year, it sold 49% of the group's financial operation (Banco Carrefour) to Itaú Unibanco, in a transaction worth R$725 million.

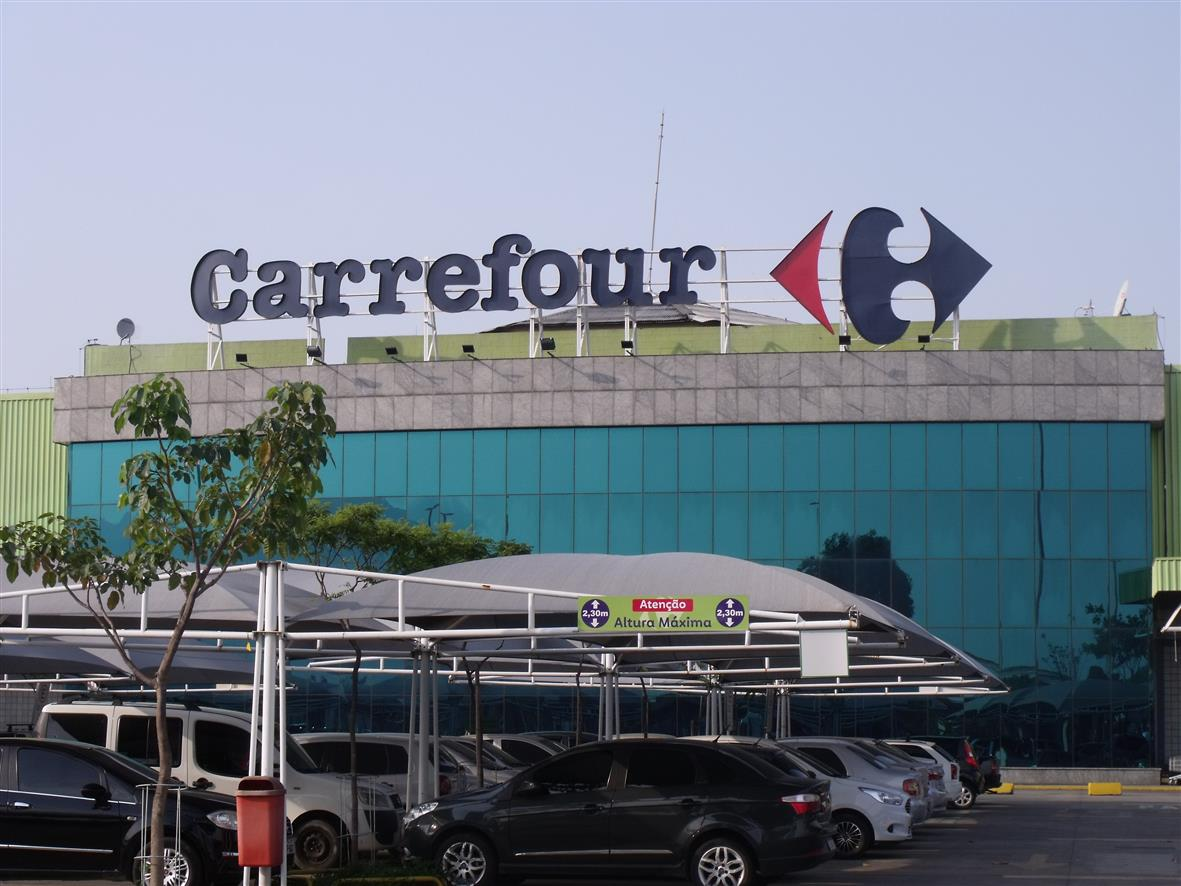
Branch in Belford Roxo, RJ .

In 2014, Carrefour opened another brand in Brazil, Carrefour Express with stores in large shopping centers in São Paulo and a more compact version of Carrefour Hiper in competition with large supermarkets such as Pão Sugar Loaf (Brazilian supermarket). The Express format is defined as proximity retail and has three main fronts: immediate consumption products, day-to-day consumption products and more planned consumption products. This format is characterized by smaller purchases in places close to home or work. In the same year, Carrefour brought Supeco to Brazil (a model created in Spain and similar to Atacadão).

In 2017, it went public on the B3, the Brazilian stock exchange. The IPO moved BRL 5.125 billion and was the biggest IPO in 4 years. The shares debuted at R$15 with negotiations starting on July 20 of that year.

In 2018, it opened a new store in São Paulo, this time with a new banner, Carrefour Market. The flag focuses on proximity stores, with 500 square meters. The concept would be an intermediary between the Express models, measuring 200 square meters, and Bairro, measuring 1,200 square meters.

In 2020, following the growth of Atacadão, its main cash-&-carry banner, the group bought 30 stores from the Dutch wholesaler Makro for R$1.95 billion. The purchase also involved 14 fuel stations attached to Makro stores. A purchase was approved by CADE in September 2020. As stores took about six months to be fully integrated.

In March 2021, the Brazilian branch announced the purchase of the competitor's operations Grupo BIG. The acquisition cost R$7.5 billion and allowed the French group to expand its presence in markets with little representation (South and Northeast regions), through regional brands (BIG and Bompreço). The group also announced that it would operate in a new segment of stores, the shopping club, with the banner Sam's Club. The acquisition was paid 70% in cash and 30% in Carrefour Brasil shares, and, at the time of the acquisition, Carrefour advanced BRL 900 million to the BIG Group sellers (Advent and Walmart). In November of the same year, the CADE ( Administrative Council for Economic Defense) determined that the acquisition, involving Carrefour and BIG, was "complex" and asked for more time to be appreciated.

Subsequently, in January 2022, the General Superintendence of the agency recommended the approval of the transaction, subject to the sale of some self-service retail units. Finally, in May 2022, the body approved, with restrictions, the purchase of Grupo BIG by Carrefour Brasil. The decision was unanimous and is subject to the sale of certain BIG stores in cities such as Gravataí, Maceió, Olinda and Recife. Carrefour, however, already had proposals for the sale of stores targeted by BIG's divestment at that time. Finally, on June 7, 2022, the acquisition was completed and the BIG Group became a subsidiary of Carrefour Brasil.

== Atacadão ==
Atacadão S.A.
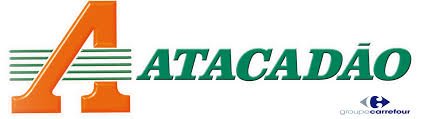
- Type: Public company
- Traded as: B3: CRFB3
- Industry: Retail
- Founded: 1960
- Headquarters: São Paulo, Brazil
- Area served: Brazil; Morocco
- Key people: (Chairman &CEO)
- Products: Hypermarkets
- Revenue: ▲US$ 7.3 million (2012)
- Net income: 1.99 Brazilian real (2022)
- Total assets: 92.29 Brazilian real (2022)
- Number of employees: 150,000 (2022)
- Parent: Carrefour
- Website: www.atacadao.com.br

Atacadão is a Brazilian chain of warehouse stores. It was established by Alcides Parizotto and then became property of the Lima family and the executives Farid Curi and Herberto Uli Schmeil. In 2007, it was bought by Carrefour for R$2,2 billion Reais. In 2010, the company has 102 stores and 7 distribution centers in 26 Brazilian states. The company competes with Assaí Atacadista, now owned by GPA, Roldão and Makro. Atacadão also runs hypermarkets in 2012 to Colombia, Argentina and Morocco, where it is present along with its parent company Carrefour.

== Brands ==
=== Brands of Carrefour ===
Carrefour operates several brands under the Carrefour brand, including a hypermarket, a supermarket, a proximity store, a drugstore and a gas station.

- Carrefour Hiper: Operates as a hypermarket. It currently has around 170 stores in this format.
- Carrefour Bairro: Operates as a proximity store and is located in large or small neighborhoods. In addition to having a large sale of organic products, Carrefour Bairro contains hygiene products and covered parking.
- Carrefour Express: Operates as a supermarket with stores located only in the state of São Paulo, and its stores operate as a mini-market and are located within commercial areas.
- Carrefour Market: Operates as a supermarket (also located only in the state of São Paulo) and focuses on selling fresh and ready-to-eat products.
- Drogaria Carrefour: Pharmacy (drugstore) selling medicines and beauty products. Its stores are inside the Carrefour Hiper units.
- Posto Carrefour: Gas station that serves a maximum of six cars with five tanks of gasoline. In addition to being located within Hypermarkets, there are units that are located within Atacadão stores.

=== Brands of Atacadão ===
Atacadão is considered the largest cash-&-carry service in the country. It currently has 344 stores in Brazil. Its stores operate in two models:

- Self-service: Traditional model, with sales of products in greater volume and dedicated to small and medium-sized companies, in addition to the final consumer.
- Distribution Center: sale of products to large companies such as hospitals and hotels, in addition to large merchants.

It is present in all states of Brazil and also in the Federal District. Since the purchase of Atacadão by Carrefour, the model has been exported to Colombia, Argentina, Morocco, Romania and Spain, in some of these countries with flag SUPECO and MAXI. Some units have services such as: Posto Atacadão and Drogaria Atacadão.

In 2014, the Supeco model created in Spain came to Brazil with a store located in Sorocaba, in the interior of São Paulo which was previously a store of Atacadão.

=== Brands of Sam's Club ===
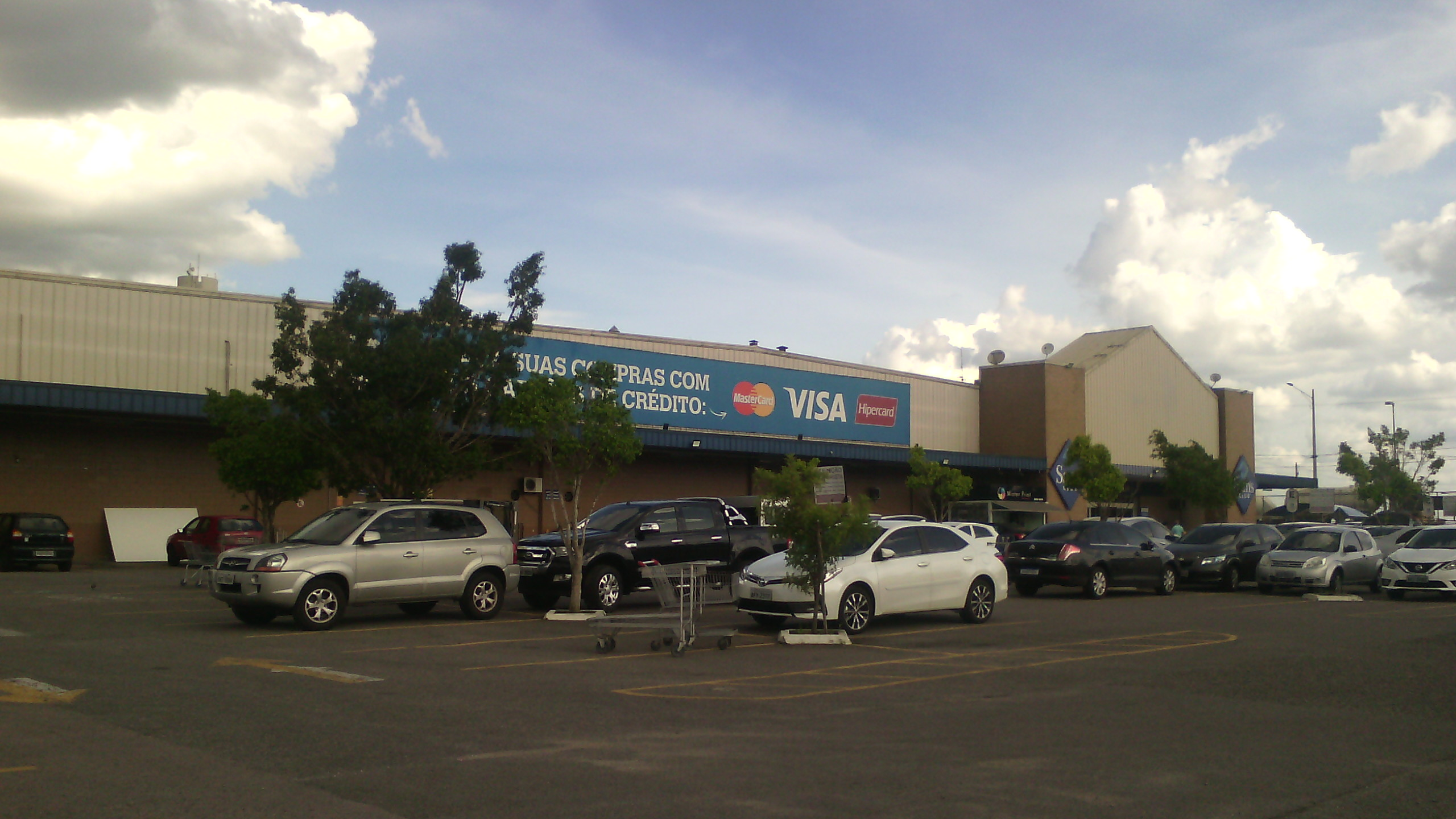
Sam's Club unit located in the Atuba district, in Curitiba.

Sam's Club is a shopping club and its The operating model is similar to a cash-and-carry, where the consumer has options in economical packaging, but also finds exclusive private label items, usually imported. The model works on the shopping club system, with the payment of an annuity to access the network stores.

The Sam's Club flag has been present in Brazil since 1995, and its first unit was inaugurated in the city of São Caetano do Sul, in the ABC region of São Paulo. When it was acquired by Carrefour, the network had with 50 units in the states of São Paulo, Rio de Janeiro, Paraná, Santa Catarina, Rio Grande do Sul, Mato Grosso do Sul, Goiás, Minas Gerais, Espírito Santo, Bahia, Sergipe, Alagoas, Pernambuco, Rio Grande do Norte and Ceará, in addition to two stores in the Federal District.

The format is considered by the group as a key element in its expansion.

=== E-Commerce ===
Until 2012, the French chain operated with a virtual store, which was closed in December of this year. The justifications were "focusing on its physical operations, such as Atacadão and Carrefour itself". Four years later, in 2016, the group announced the return of its e-commerce operation in the country, initially selling non-food products, such as electronics. Two years later, the group announced the start of sales of food products on the website, initially restricted to Barueri, Guarulhos, Osasco, Taboão da Serra, Santo André, São Bernardo do Campo, São Caetano do Sul and Diadema.

== Incidents ==
In Brazil, from 2007 onwards, the chain suffered at least four lawsuits against violence, racism and homophobia, in addition to an execution against a man who stole 4 pieces of chicken meat, for public humiliation against employees and violence against children.

On 9 May 2023 residents of Cabula expressed their dissatisfaction with works by the Carrefour Group that caused damage to houses and condominiums in Salvador.

=== Violence ===
A case of beatings followed by death occurred at the Supermercado Dia e Noite store, a subsidiary of the Carrefour group in São Carlos. The theft of two cheese breads, some drumsticks and hair cream, committed by bricklayer Ademir Peraro, aged 43 at the time, led to his beating by the store supervisor and a security guard. After the end of torture, the victim was locked in the bathroom until the store closed, when he was thrown into the street. Rescued by family members, he was taken to the hospital; before dying, the mason was able to report the torture he was subjected to. The most costly lawsuit for Carrefour so far was in the amount of R$50,000, followed by another for R$44,640.

In December 2010, a Freezer electrocuted and killed a girl in an Atacadão supermarket, the Freezer was investigated.

In November 2014, the Atacadão supermarket was sentenced to pay R$300,000 for moral damages, According to the Public Ministry of Labor of Alagoas (MPT) this Wednesday (19), the Atacado Comércio e Indústria LTDA supermarket, located in the upper zone of Maceió, it is not authorized to perform intimate searches on its employees, a practice that the company frequently engages in.

In February 2017, an employee of the chain in Goiânia shot three customers, one of them died, and two others were injured, the employee was arrested, and Carrefour issued a note repudiating the case.

On 5 January 2019, the Rio de Janeiro branch made the news after 15 cats were killed by poisoning by supermarket employees. The company became aware of the case, and carried out a census to determine the animals that resided in its units so that it could rescue them and direct them to shelters.

In 2020, two death-related incidents were reported in Brazil. The first one happened in August when a sales representative died of a heart attack. To allow the store to continue operating, other workers hid his body in a barricade made out of umbrellas and cardboard boxes.

On 8 May 2023 a couple accused of theft in Salvador was attacked by network security guards. The company became aware of the case, terminated the contract with the security company and reported the attacks to the Civil Police of Itapuã.

=== Racism ===
In one of the cases, a black man who owned a Ford EcoSport was mistaken for a thief while caring for his sleeping two-year-old child in the parking lot, while waiting for the rest of his family who were shopping inside. He was initially approached by a security officer in plain clothes who accused him of stealing the vehicle, who then punched his face and injuring his jaw. He was then taken inside by third-party security and physically and psychologically tortured for more than 15 minutes, in addition to hearing slurs referring to his black color. After the incident, the store removed the security officer and discredited the third-party security company.

On 20 October 2018, a black and disabled customer was attacked by chain employees in Osasco, after opening a can of beer inside the store and saying he would pay for it. The company became aware of the case, and employees were fired.

On 11 February 2019 an elderly person was expelled from the network in Anápolis after being mistaken for a homeless person, Carrefour issued a note repudiating the case.

On 19 November 2020, one day before the Brazilian holiday Black Awareness Day, a 40-year-old black man named João Alberto Silveira Freitas was killed by security guards after an altercation with a cashier. After an alleged "violent gesture" to one of the cashiers, two security guards were called, proceeded to drag the man out of the store and beat him to death in the parking lot. Both security guards were arrested and charged with qualified homicide.

On 8 April 2023, Vinicius, husband of volleyball player Fabiana, was prevented from being seen due to his color. On 10 April 2023, teacher Isabel Oliveira, 43, took off her clothes inside a supermarket in Curitiba (PR) in protest against racism. She was reportedly followed by security.

=== Animal abuse ===
On 31 January 2011 the Santo André branch made the news after a stray dog was beaten by employees and customers of the Atacadão supermarket. On 2 July 2015 the Vila Velha branch became news after a cat was beaten by Atacadão employees, the case was reported to the authorities, and Carrefour issued a note repudiating the case.

On 28 November 2018, a mixed-breed dog named Manchinha was poisoned and later beaten to death with an aluminum bar by one of the security guards at a Carrefour store in the city of Osasco, São Paulo. The episode, known as the Manchinha case or Caso Manchinha, sparked a series of protests led by activists in front of the Osasco store in December 2018, and also inspired the creation of bill PL 1.095/2019, which was later approved by the executive and turned into a federal law in September 2020, imposing harsher penalties to crimes related to animal abuse.

On 3 August 2021 a stray dog was shot with an indigenous weapon from the Atacadão establishment by an Atacadão employee in Mato Grosso do Sul, Later, the employee was indicted for the crime of mistreatment of animals.

=== Staff ===
On 16 May 2019 Carrefour was banned by the Court from controlling employee visits to the bathroom. On 4 May 2021 a water channel was stained with oil by a Carrefour employee in Santos. The company was fined BRL 12,555,000 for what happened. In October 2021, a video that a customer recorded on social networks showed a Carrefour employee being humiliated by his manager in Mato Grosso do Sul. She was later removed from office.

== See also ==
- Carrefour
- Carrefour Express
- Carrefour Market
- Carrefour City
- Carrefour Planet
- Carrefour Group
- Sam's Club
- Walmart
- Bompreço
- Atacadao
