= Orelha case =

Killing of a community dog in Santa Catarina state, Brazil

The Orelha the dog case refers to the death of a community dog named Orelha on January 4, 2026, in Praia Brava, a neighborhood in northern Florianópolis, Santa Catarina, Brazil, where he had lived for ten years and was informally cared for by local residents. Orelha was found weakened and was later euthanized at a veterinary clinic. The early released veterinary report indicated that Orelha suffered a severe head injury, likely caused by a blunt object such as a piece of wood or bottle. However, an expert report prepared by a veterinary expert after exhuming the dog's body ruled out the possibility of recent trauma consistent with abuse.

The Civil Police of Santa Catarina, responsible for the investigation, executed search and seizure warrants against four teenagers allegedly involved in Orelha's death and their legal guardians, and indicted three adults suspected of coercing a witness. Initial inquiries suggested the teenagers had also attempted to drown a caramelo dog, though this was later ruled out by police. In addition to animal cruelty, they are being investigated for other offenses recorded that month, including theft of alcoholic beverages, property damage, and disturbance of the peace.

In a statement submitted to the court, the Public Prosecutor's Office of Santa Catarina requested the complete dismissal of the case. The main hypothesis for the animal's death was a serious health condition. Judge Vanessa Bonetti Haupenthal, of the Children's Court of the Court of Justice of Santa Catarina, agreed with the request of the Public Prosecutor's Office request and decided to close the case.

The case received nationwide and international media coverage, sparking public debate about lowering the age of criminal responsibility in Brazil, leading to the proposal of a bill called "Lei Orelha" in Santa Catarina that increases penalties for animal cruelty crimes in the state. Orelha's death triggered protests across various Brazilian cities and mobilized residents, celebrities, independent animal advocates, non-governmental organizations, and animal rights groups demanding justice. On social media, the movement gained visibility through the hashtag #JustiçaPorOrelha.

== Background ==
The Praia Brava area in northern Florianópolis, Santa Catarina, features three small shelters for community dogs that lived in the neighborhood and, over time, were adopted by residents as local mascots, receiving food, care, and attention from the community. Orelha, one of these animals, was approximately ten years old and described by residents as "docile and playful". He freely interacted with other neighborhood animals, becoming part of the area's daily life.

Veterinarian Fernanda Oliveira, who monitored Orelha, stated he was a "symbol of joy" and popular among tourists. According to her, he always received medical care, including deworming, vaccinations, and check-ups as needed, with residents covering costs afterward. The Praia Brava Residents' Association described Orelha as a "simple yet deeply beloved symbol" of community living.

== Alleged attack and death ==
In the early days of January 2026, the community dog Orelha was found collapsed and in agony in a wooded area of Praia Brava by one of his caregivers during a walk. The woman, identified as Fátima, took Orelha to a veterinary clinic, but due to the severity of his injuries, he was euthanized and died on January 5.

The veterinary report, released on January 27, documented a severe head injury (likely from a blunt object such as a stick, bottle, or similar item), primarily on the left side of the face, with intense swelling. The exam also revealed moderate protrusion of the left eye—where the eyeball protrudes from the socket—along with bleeding from the mouth and nose. Examiners noted possible fractures to the mandible and maxilla, as well as generalized ataxia (loss of motor coordination), dyspnea (breathing difficulty), and bradycardia (abnormally slow heart rate).

In February 2026, an exhumation of the animal's body was carried out by the Scientific Police of Santa Catarina, at the request of the Public Prosecutor's Office, with the aim of clarifying the circumstances of the death. The expert report failed to determine the cause of death and did not identify bone fractures or evidence of perforation by a sharp object, contradicting some initial hypotheses that were publicly released.

== Investigation ==
The Civil Police of the State of Santa Catarina learned of the case, classified as animal cruelty, on January 16, 2026, opening an inquiry with oversight from the Public Prosecutor's Office of the State of Santa Catarina via the 10th Capital Prosecutor's Office (Childhood and Youth) and the 32nd (Environment). Initial information, including security camera footage and resident statements, indicated four teenagers allegedly attacked community dog Orelha on January 4, 2026, with alleged videos of the incident circulating on social media. Investigations also suggested the same group attempted to drown a caramelo dog on January 6 by carrying it toward the sea; However, later it was found that this was a prior, unrelated incident in which a different group of adolescents was filmed playing with a dog, at a different beach, who was mistaken for a local dog of Praia Brava subsequently adopted by delegate Ulisses Gabriel. On January 31, police ruled out the teenagers' involvement in the Caramelo drowning attempt. The minors were also under investigation for other infractions that month in Praia Brava, including theft of alcoholic beverages, property damage, and disturbance of the peace.

On January 22, the presiding judge declared herself recused due to a close family connection to one of the teenagers; she had previously denied breaking phone secrecy for the suspects' parents. On January 26, Civil Police launched an operation executing three search and seizure warrants at the teenagers' and guardians' homes, plus against adults suspected of coercion during proceedings. Cell phones and electronic devices were seized for analysis. On January 27, police announced at a press conference that three adults (two parents and an uncle) had been indicted for coercing at least one witness; however, this was later dismissed after determining that the so-called coercion was a disagreement between the family and the witness one week before the police had even opened an investigation. A doorman at the suspects' building was reportedly suspended after allegedly sharing an image of the incident in a WhatsApp group, though he and his defense denied any filming occurred.

According to chief delegate Ulisses Gabriel, two of the four teenagers traveled to the United States for a graduation trip shortly after the incident, visiting Disney in Orlando. The trip had been planned a year earlier and was unrelated to the case; airport security was heightened to prevent protests. Upon returning to Brazil on January 29, they faced search warrants, device seizures, and were summoned for questioning. As the case involves minors, proceedings are confidential and names were not officially released, though leaks occurred. A couple misidentified as parents of one suspect (actually business associates of one mother) received over 100 death threats and filed a police report.

On January 28, 2026, the Juvenile Court of Florianópolis ordered social media platforms to remove content exposing the teenagers' identities (names, nicknames, family ties, addresses, photos, or videos) within 24 hours, citing protections under the Federal Constitution and the Child and Adolescent Statute (ECA). The ruling applied to Meta (Facebook, Instagram, WhatsApp) and ByteDance (TikTok), with daily fines for non-compliance.

On May 8, 2026, the Public Prosecutor's Office of Santa Catarina (MPSC) submitted a 170-page statement to the Court of Law of the Children and Youth Division of the Florianópolis District, signed by three Public Prosecutor's Offices, requesting the dismissal of the investigation into the Praia Brava dogs case. According to expert evidence, the claim that the dog Orelha and the teenager identified as the alleged perpetrator were in the same space, as stated in the police reports, was not substantiated, as security camera footage showed the teenager was approximately six hundred meters away from Orelha during the time the alleged attack was theorized to have occurred; footage also shows Orelha walking normally and seemingly not hurt one hour and a half after the alleged attack. It was also found that the main hypothesis for Orelha's death was a serious medical condition, not aggression, since he had osteomyelitis, he did not present cuts, tears, or fractures, and no evident signs of mistreatment were identified. It was also highlighted that the female dog "Pretinha," his companion, died days later from tick-borne disease, which "reinforces the context of the animals' sanitary vulnerability."

The prosecutors also highlighted the "complete absence of visual or direct testimonial evidence" confirming Orelha's presence at Praia Brava during the period in which he was allegedly assaulted. Furthermore, according to the Public Prosecutor's Office, the version of the assault was based on third-party comments, rumors, and social media content. The Public Prosecutor's Office requested the dismissal of the investigation into the alleged coercion, ruled out any infraction in the case of the dogs "Caramelo," and requested a specific investigation to assess any illegal activity related to the potential monetization of false content related to the episode, in what it called the "virtual lynching" of the teenagers.

On May 14, 2026, Judge Vanessa Bonetti Haupenthal, of the Children's Court of the State Court of Justice, decided to close the investigations due to insufficient evidence to prove the alleged offenses. The judge also ordered the removal of travel restrictions for the investigated teenager and ordered the Federal Police to return his passport, in addition to denying the request for the young man's provisional detention.

== Repercussion ==
=== National ===
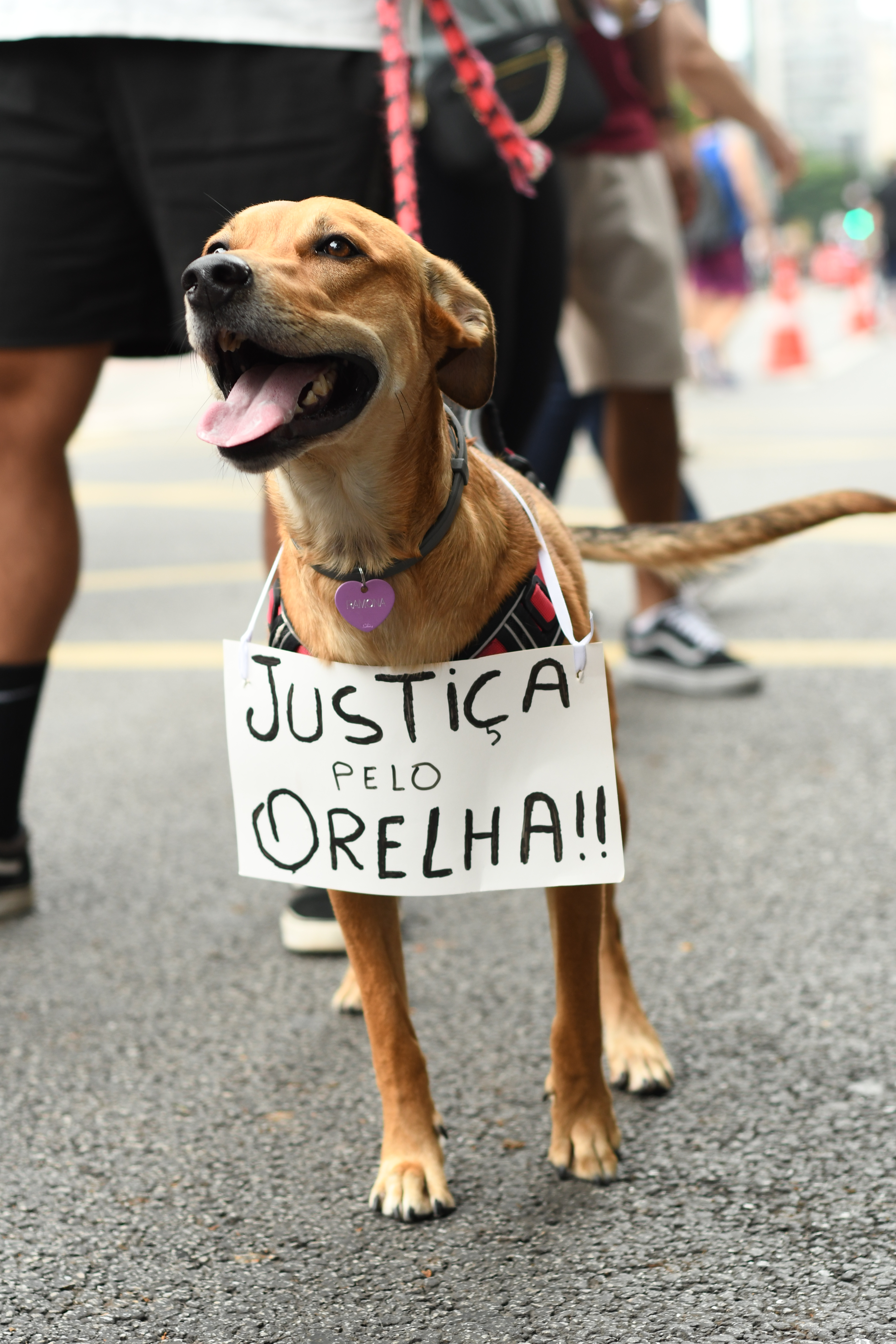
The murder of the dog Orelha sparked protests by thousands of people in several cities across Brazil.

Orelha's death sparked nationwide outrage, mobilizing residents, celebrities, independent advocates, non-governmental organizations, and animal rights groups demanding justice. The campaign gained traction online via the hashtag #JustiçaPorOrelha. In Praia Brava, the first public demonstration occurred on January 17, 2026, followed by a larger protest on January 24 with dozens of people and their dogs in custom shirts, signs, and prayers honoring Orelha, calling for answers from the Civil Police of Santa Catarina and harsher punishment. Hundreds protested outside the Santa Catarina Court of Justice in Florianópolis on January 29. Demonstrations occurred in capitals including Brasília, Rio de Janeiro, São Paulo, Porto Alegre, Salvador, Recife, Belo Horizonte, and cities such as São José (SC), Sorocaba (SP), Blumenau (SC), and Dourados (MS).

Google Brasil reported over 100,000 searches related to Orelha's death from January 26–28, topping trending terms. Two online petitions demanding stricter animal cruelty penalties and accountability garnered over 170,000 signatures combined. The case unusually united Brazil's left and right in calling for justice, transcending typical political polarization. State deputy Mário Motta (PSD-SC) proposed the "Lei Orelha" bill increasing animal cruelty penalties in Santa Catarina. Senator Humberto Costa (PT-Pernambuco) sought urgency for bill 4,363/2025 enhancing Environmental Crimes Law penalties. Deputies Capitão Alden (PL-Bahia) and Rosana Valle (PL-SP) also proposed related legislation.

Santa Catarina Governor Jorginho Mello said the evidence "turned my stomach". Florianópolis Mayor Topázio Neto noted the city was "shocked". First Lady Janja Lula da Silva expressed "sadness and indignation". Environment Minister Marina Silva called Orelha "another victim of violence against animals". Singer Ana Castela stressed "killing a dog is a crime". Actor Rafael Portugal labeled it "pure evil". Actresses Heloísa Périsse and Paula Burlamaqui demanded action. Activist Luisa Mell said the report suggested worse injuries than initially reported. Voice actor Tadeu Mello expressed deep sadness. Presenter Ana Maria Braga tearfully called for justice on Mais Você and signed a petition. Actress Paolla Oliveira vented, calling the alleged suspects "criminals".

=== International ===
Actor Paul Wesley of The Vampire Diaries shared an Instagram story calling for justice for Orelha. International coverage, especially in Spanish-language media, highlighted the case. Argentine portal Infobae noted unusual cross-ideological unity in polarized Brazil. France 24 covered the teen investigation, national protests, and Janja's reaction. Argentine La Nación emphasized public outrage and investigation progress. Colombian Semana stressed the crime's brutality and nationwide impact beyond local scope.

== See also ==
- List of individual dogs
- Manchinha case
- Preta case
- Sansão case
