= Sansão case =

2020 abuse of a dog in Brazil

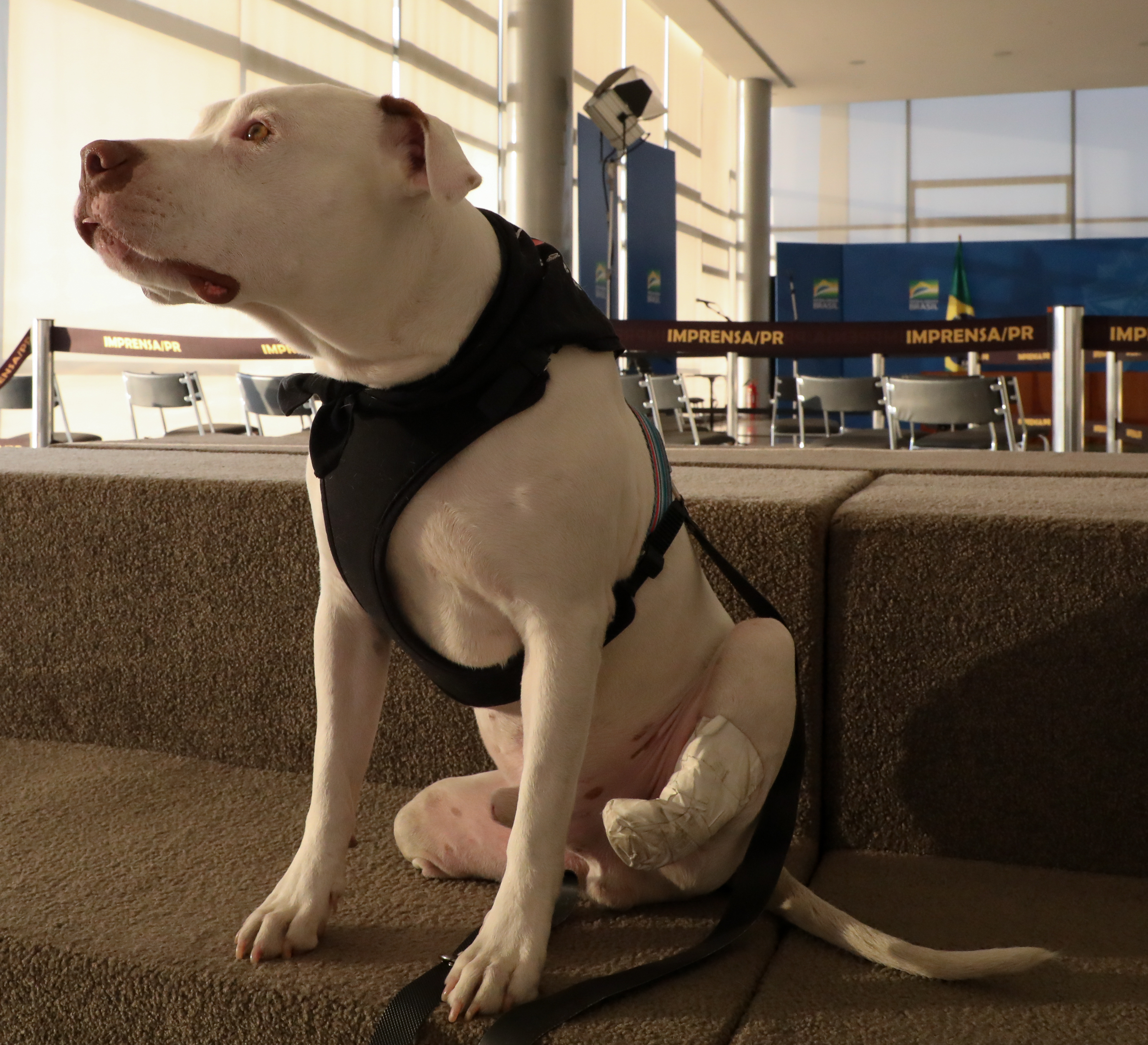
- Sansão after the attack, in September 2020
- Location: Confins, Minas Gerais, Brazil
- Date: July 6, 2020
- Target: Sansão
- Attack type: Attempted murder, dismemberment, and animal cruelty
- Weapon: Sickle
- Injuries: 1 (Sansão)
- Victims: Sansão, a pitbull
- Perpetrators: 2 suspects (unidentified)

Sansão case (Portuguese: caso Sansão) refers to the torture and attempted murder of a pit bull dog whose two hind legs were dismembered. It occurred in Brazil on July 6, 2020, and led the National Congress of the country to increase the penalty for animal cruelty.

== Incident ==
The two suspects tortured the pit bull with a sickle. The dog, who was 2 years old at the time, had his two hind legs severed. It happened in the late afternoon of July 6. Both suspects were arrested and later held responsible for the crime of animal abuse.

== Reactions ==
The case led to an increase in the penalty for those who commit animal abuse against dogs and cats, from three months to one year to two to five years. In September 2020, Brazilian President Jair Bolsonaro signed into law a bill that imposes prison sentences for acts of abuse, mistreatment or violence against dogs and cats. The legislation, known as the Lei Sansão (Sansão Law), also includes fines and bans on pet ownership for offenders. The change was intended to ensure that animal abuse is no longer considered a minor offence, allowing law enforcement to respond more quickly to incidents. The bill was authored by Congressman Fred Costa and passed in the Senate on September 9, 2021.

== Gallery ==
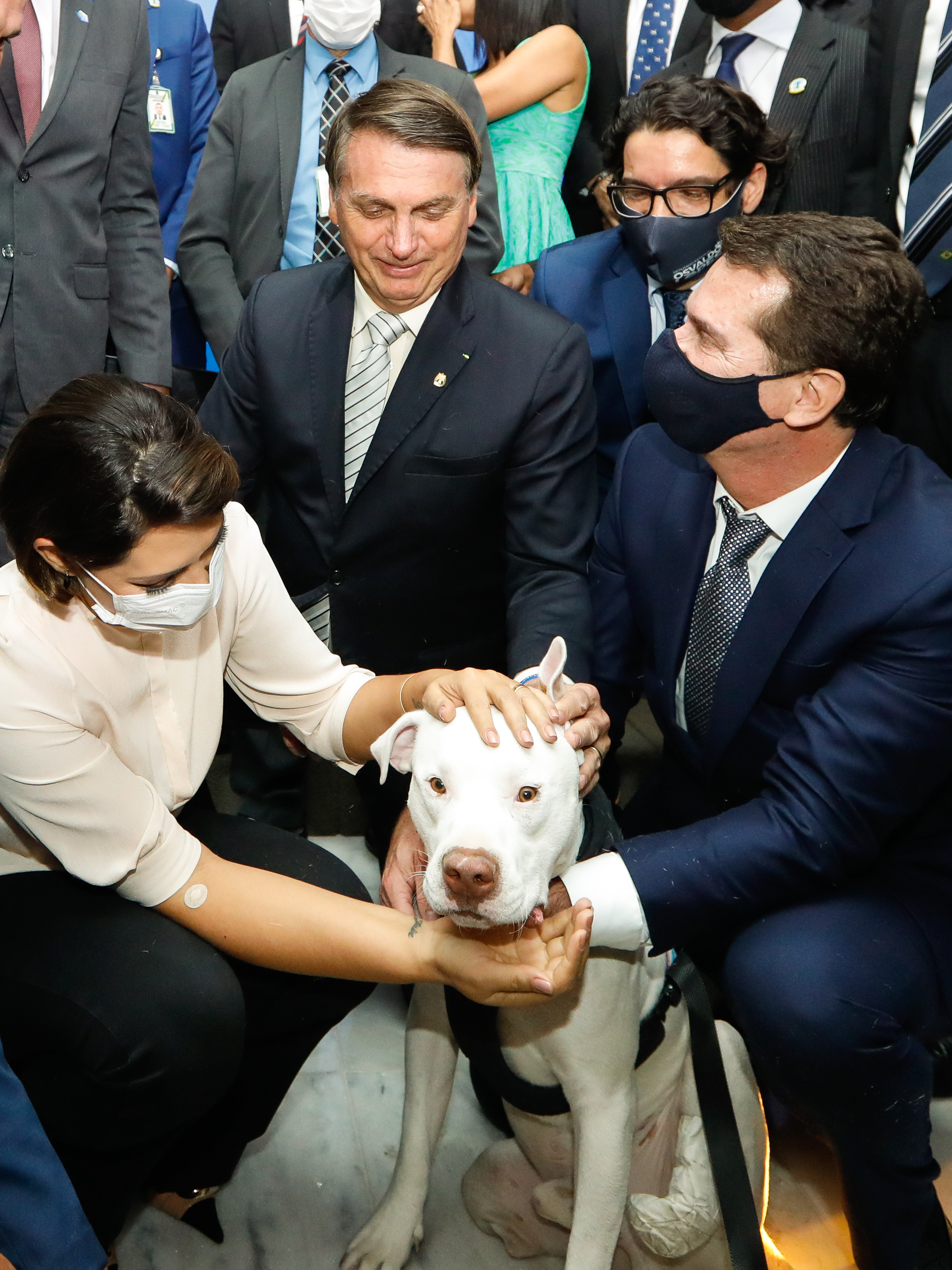
Jair and Michelle Bolsonaro with Sansão

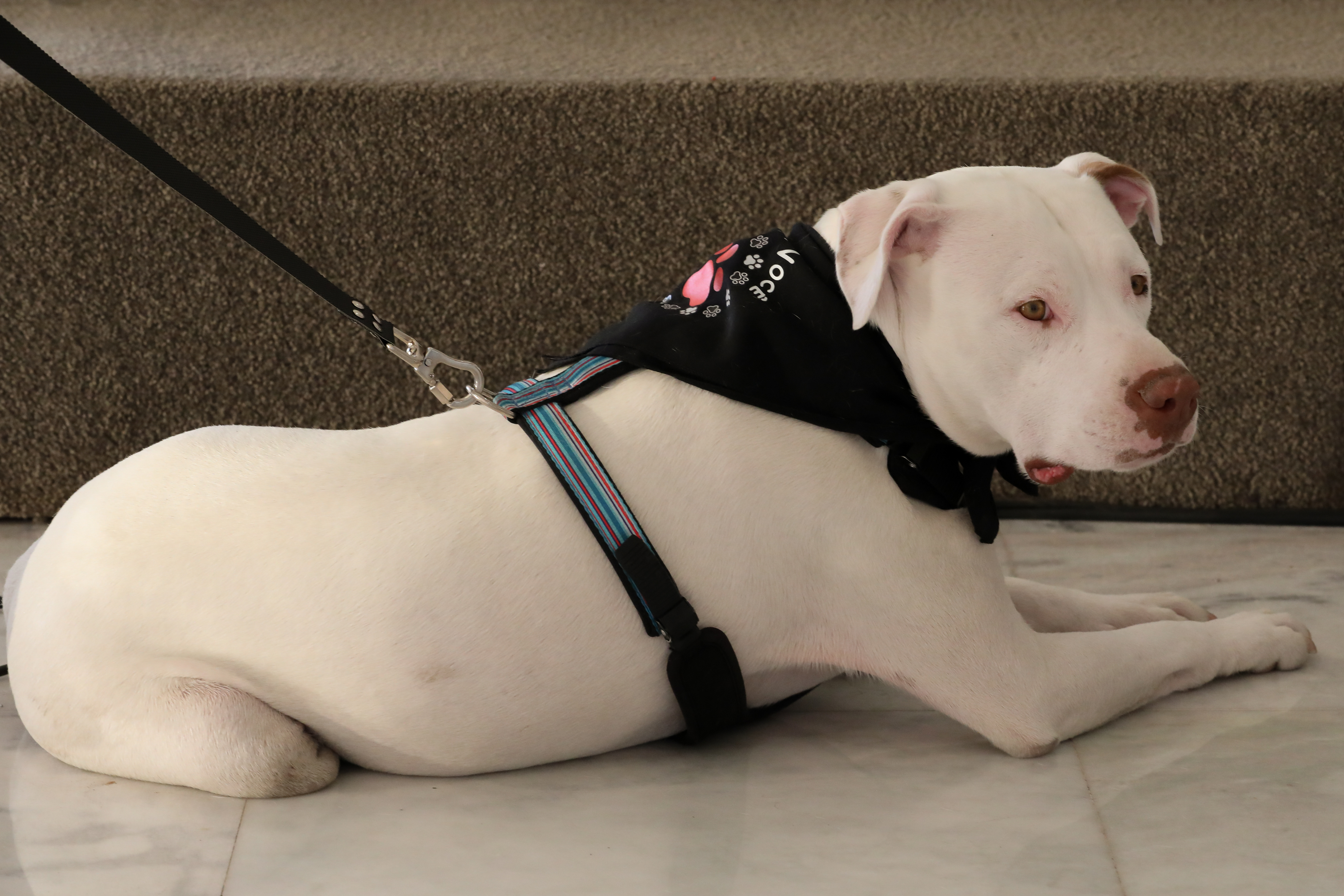
Sansão lying on the floor

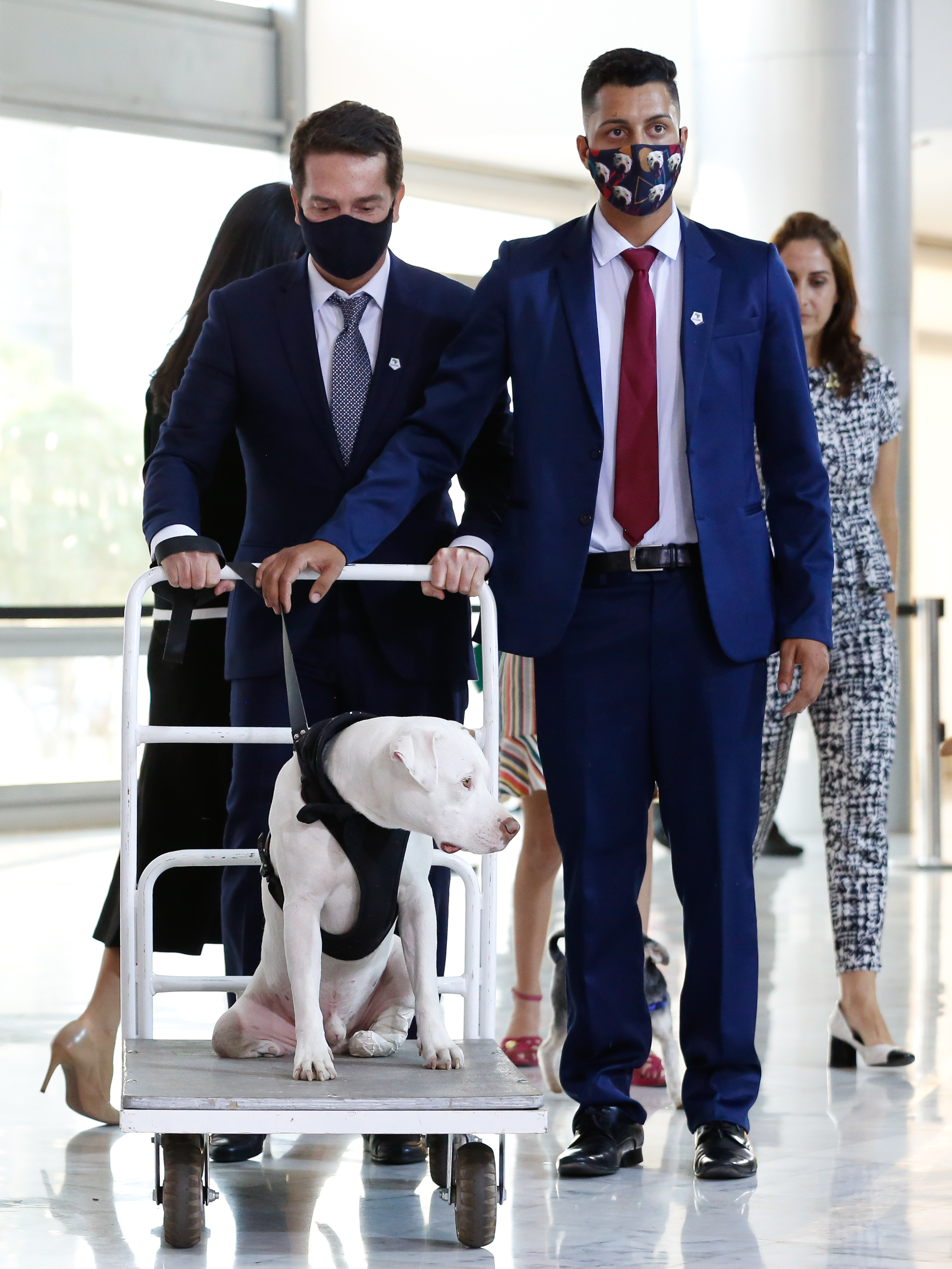
Sansão arriving at the ceremony in which Jair Bolsonaro signed Sansão Law

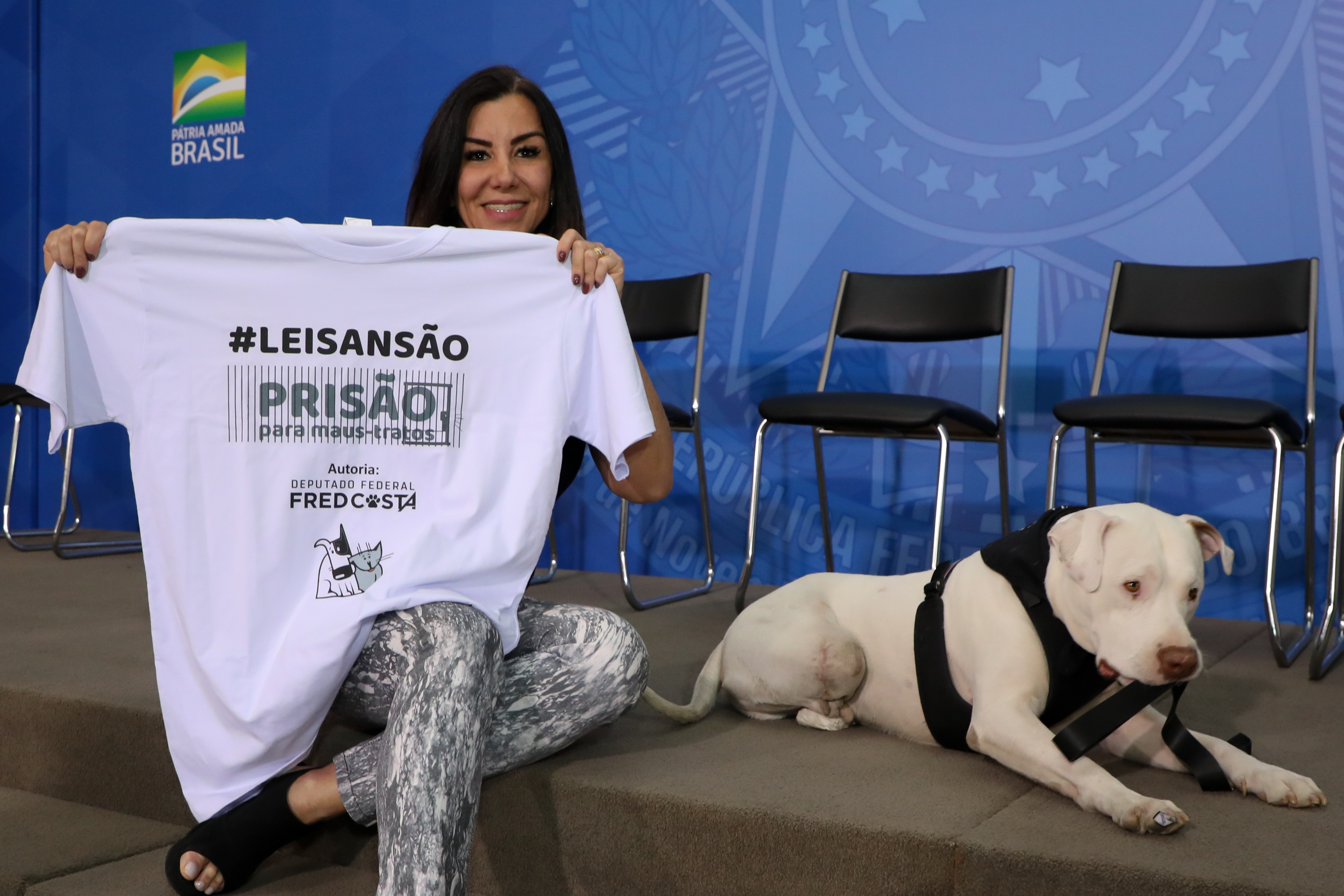
Shirt with the inscription Lei Sansão

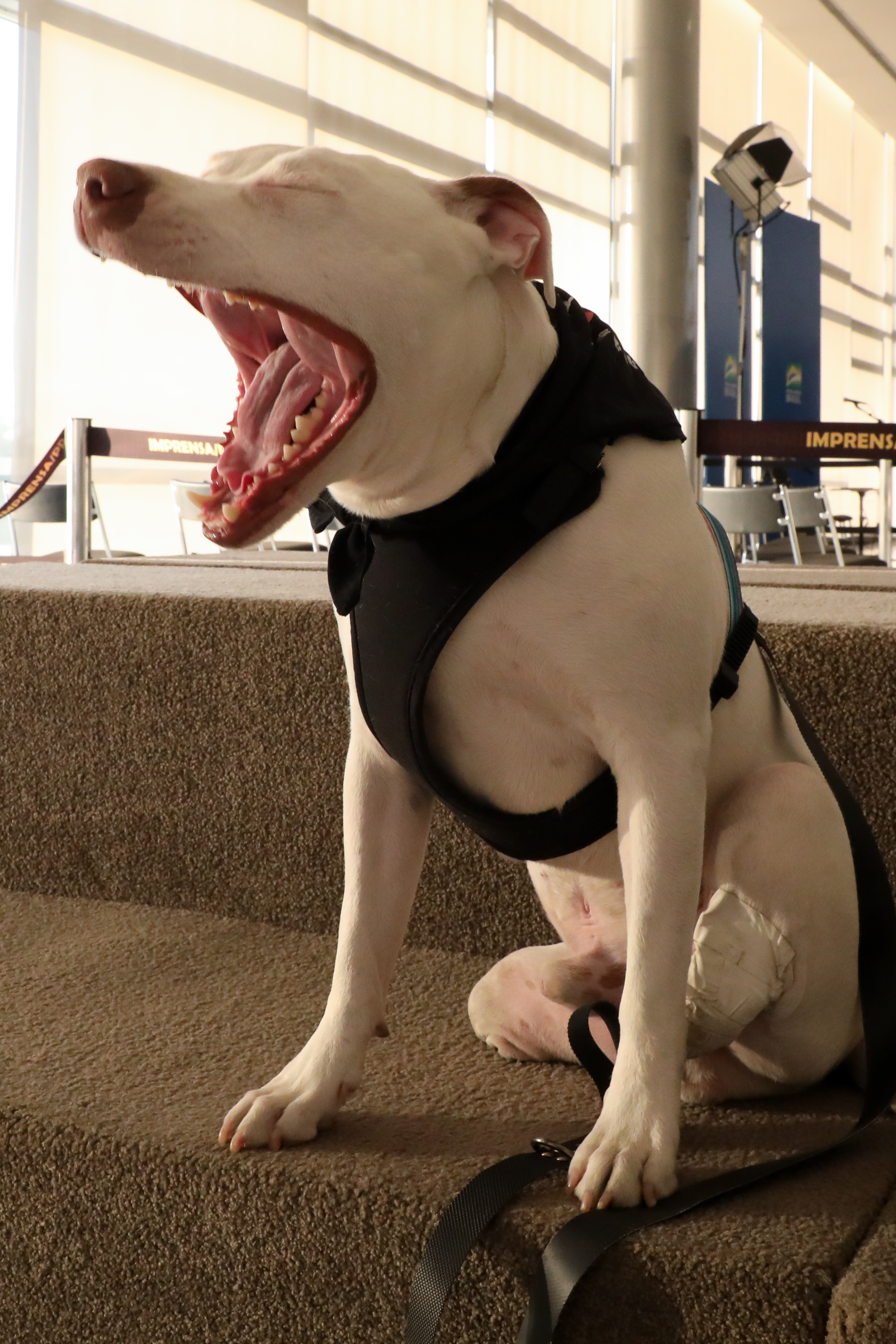
Sansão yawning

== See also ==
- List of individual dogs
- Resistência (dog)
- Manchinha case
- Orelha case
- Preta case
