= Manchinha case =

2018 killing of a dog in São Paulo, Brazil

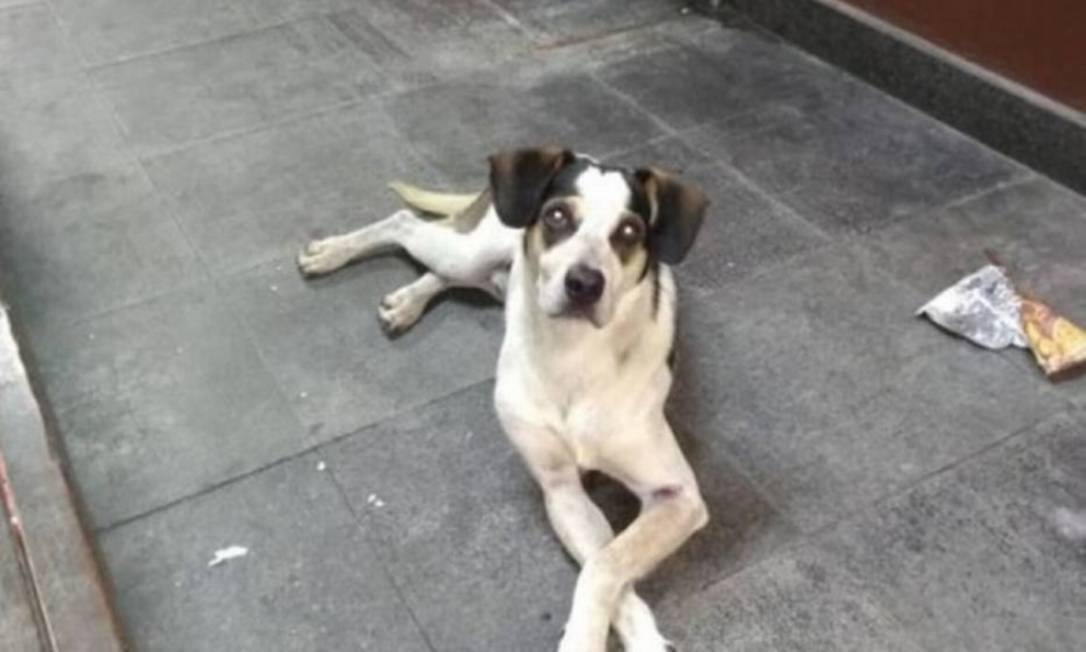
- Location: Carrefour supermarket, Osasco, Greater São Paulo, Brazil
- Date: 28 November 2018
- Attack type: Cruelty to animals
- Weapons: Rat poison and aluminum bar
- Deaths: 1
- Victim: 1 (Machinha)
- Perpetrator: Marco Antonio de Souza
- No. of participants: 1
- Defender: Marco Antonio de Souza

On 28 November 2018, a stray dog named Manchinha was killed by a Carrefour employee near a store where she had been living in Osasco, Greater São Paulo, Brazil. The case generated national and international backlash against the French corporation and led to the passing of a law that increased the penalty for the mistreatment of animals by the Brazilian Congress.

== Manchinha ==
Manchinha was an abandoned female mixed-breed dog. She lived in the parking lot of a Carrefour hypermarket and was given food and water by customers and employees. The name Manchinha means small spot in Portuguese and refers to the dark spots in her white fur.

== Background and crime ==
In November 2018, the owners of the Carrefour store were notified of an upcoming visit from store headquarters. An employee responsible for site security was ordered to remove the dog from the parking lot. The employee reportedly carried out the order by giving Manchinha mortadella containing rat poison, then beating her with an aluminum bar. Employees of the Zoonosis center in the city rescued the dog, but she died. The attending veterinarian concluded that the cause of death was blood loss. The store at first said that the dog had been run over, but later admitted the employee had killed her. It was three days before the case was reported to the authorities.

== Response ==
The case generated national and international condemnation. Social media posts generated a wave of protests against Carrefour chain stores throughout Brazil. Approximately 600,000 comments about the event were made on Carrefour's social media platforms in December 2019, most of them unfavorable. Several celebrities, including Tatá Werneck and Luciano Huck, made statements about the case. Luisa Mell, an actor and animal rights activist, spoke out against Carrefour. Several store employees were called to testify in an investigation by the São Paulo Civil Police into the dog's death.

The security guard responsible was identified and removed from his position. He confessed to killing the dog and declared himself repentant. The investigation concluded on 18 December 2018. He was found guilty of the crime of abuse and mistreatment of animals, but was not immediately arrested.

=== Legacy ===
In February 2019, the case sparked a proposal for stricter laws against animal abuse. The Brazilian National Congress approved PL 1,095/2019, increasing the maximum penalties for those responsible for mistreatment of animals from two to five years and a maximum fine of one thousand minimum wages. In September 2020, President Jair Bolsonaro signed the bill into law. Manchinha has become a symbol of animal rights and of brutality in security enforcement in Brazil.

After an agreement with the Public Ministry in March 2019, Carrefour and security were fined BRL 1 million, and BRL 1 million was transferred to an animal protection fund set up by the municipality of Osasco. Carrefour also conducted a census to identify animals living on company property and transport them to shelters.

Manchinha received several tributes after her death. In November 2021, a statue was erected in her memory at a pet park in Osasco.

== See also ==
- List of individual dogs
- Orelha case
- Preta case
- Sansão case
