= Todeschini Alimentos =

Defunct Brazilian pasta factory

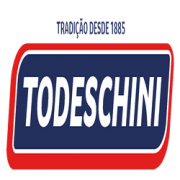

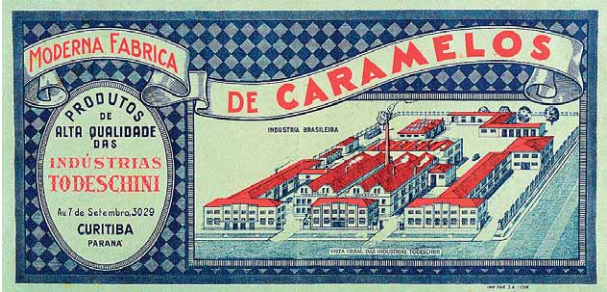
- A caramel label showing the original factory from Todeschini.
- Native name: Todeschini Alimentos
- Type: Private
- Industry: Food industry
- Founded: 1885; 141 years ago
- Founder: Giuseppe Todeschini
- Defunct: 2013; 13 years ago (factory)
- Headquarters: Curitiba, Brazil
- Products: pasta, biscuits, candy, cakes, grated cheese, Ice cream cones
- Brands: Todeschini, Easy Life, Tia Anastácia, Leve Supreme and others
- Website: https://www.todeschinialimentos.com.br

Todeschini Alimentos was a Brazilian pasta factory founded by Italian Brazilian Giuseppe Todeschini in 1885. Located in Curitiba, it was the first factory of its kind in southern Brazil.

Initially successful, Todeschini began facing financial difficulties in 2002. Seven years after being aggregated by Imcopa (later AC Comercial), it was officially declared bankrupt in 2013.

Currently, its products are manufactured by Pastifício Selmi, a multinational company that acquired the Todeschini brand in 2021.

== History ==
=== First years ===
Originally named Indústrias Todeschini SA (Todeschini Industries), it was created by the Italian immigrant Giuseppe Todeschini in 1885, Curitiba. The original headquarters were located at Sete de Setembro Avenue, at a farm he bought for his family in 1878. The company is the first pasta factory from South Brazil and originally had six employees. Pasta was not consumed locally, so Todeschini had to teach buyers how to prepare it. Initially, the pasta was manually produced, but Todeschini made his own machinery. In 1901, they inaugurated their first factory, Fabbrica di Paste Alimenticie di Giuseppe Todeschini (Edible Pasta Factory from Giuseppe Todeschini) or Fábrica di Paste Alimenticie d’Ogni Qualitá (Edible Pasta Factory from All Qualities). The factory used animal traction for production.

=== Growth ===
In 1900, Todeschini stepped down from his business and his children took his place. The company was renamed José Todeschini & Filhos (José Todeschini & Sons). The name was kept until 1911. In 1912, Paulo Grotzner founded Fábrica Lucinda, Todeschini biggest rival. Todeschini died on 7 August 1922, .

In 1922, Todeschini Alimentos launched the Fábrica de Balas (Candy Factory). In 1951, the company entered in the biscuit sector. Soon, the company started the production of ice cream cones. In 1971, their headquarters changed to Pinheirinho neighborhood. In 90s, the company started their line of colorful pasta.

=== Financial problems and closure ===
Since 2002, Todeschini Alimentos was suffering from financial problems due competition and administrative problems.

In 2006, Todeschini started a strategic partnership with Imcopa and later AC Comercial, where the later fed the company with raw material and offered to buy the company in eight years, as long as it produced their products in the due period.

In December 2012, production was ceased. Workers came back from vacation just to find the Pinheirinho factory closed. In February 2013, the company officially declared bankruptcy. 336 employees were fired and the factory site was abandoned. The workers entered with a legal action to freeze Todeschini assets until their wages were paid. After one year, most of the debt towards the employees was paid.

In 2014, the Todeschini brand was officially licensed to Pastifício Selmi. In 2021, Selmi bought the brand.

== Products ==
Originally, Todeschini produced the Todeschini pasta brand. The brand also sold biscuits, candy and ice cream cones.

Since 2009, Todeschini produced more than 100 food products for AC Comercial, including the brands Easy Life spaghetti, Tia Anastácia and Leve Supreme. In 2007, Todeschini sold a brand of tomato-based cake fabricated by Siol Alimentos.
