= Belarmino da Ascenção Marta =

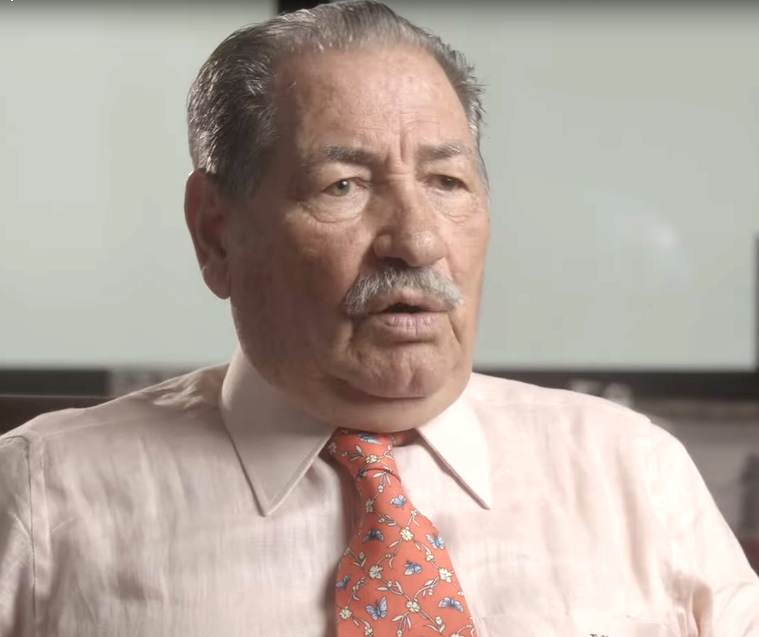
- Belarmino in 2023
- Born: 15 August 1936 (age 89); Vilar do Rei
- Occupation: Businessman
- Organization: Grupo Belarmino
- Spouse: Nivia Marta
- Children: 2

Belarmino da Ascenção Marta is a Portuguese Brazilian businessman known for owning several transportation companies, specially buses, in São Paulo under the Grupo Belarmino company.

== History ==
=== Early life ===
Belarmino was born on 15 August 1936 in the halt of Vilar do Rei, Trás-os-Montes, Portugal.

=== Immigration to Brazil ===
On 11 November 1952, he, his parents and siblings immigrated to São Paulo, Brazil. His first profession was as a fruit seller for Companhia de Entrepostos e Armazéns Gerais de São Paulo (CEAGESP). As the business grew, his family bought 16 trucks for the transportation of the goods for Santos and Rio de Janeiro. Their original plan was to immigrate to Canada.

=== Grupo Belarmino ===
In 1961, his family founded the Auto Viação Brasil Luxo and bought eight buses. Business thrived and in a few months they owned 14 buses. In 1976, Belarmino began the process of buying other companies and fusing with his own. In 1978, the company extended their operations through São Paulo state, with emphasis in Campinas. During the 90s, Belarmino was the president of the Transurb syndicate.

With time, his companies, controlled by Grupo Belarmino, began actuating in other areas, such as reselling cars from Mercedes-Benz, fuel transportation and garbage collector. In 2012, his company was the second biggest in Brazil inside his sector. Amongst his companies, are Nove de Julho, Sambaiba Transportes Urbanos, Via Norte, Urca, ConSor, Empresa Bragantina de Varrição e Coleta de Lixo, Empresa São José, MoV Vinhedo, MoV Paulínia, MoV São João da Boa Vista, MoV Nova Odessa, MoV Louveira, MoV Itu, MoV Avaré, MoV Boituva, MoV Sumaré, MoV Monte Mor, Nossa Senhora de Fátima Auto Ônibus, Rápido Luxo Campinas, Rápido Sumaré, Transportes Capellini, ValleSul Transportes e Turismo, VBex Encomendas, VB Cargas, Viaje Mais, Viação Atual, Viação Avante, Viação Campos dos Ouros, Viação Itu, Viação Lira, Viação Ouro Verde, Viação Transgualhurense, Viação Real Transportes e Serviços, West Side Viagens e Turismo, Monte Alegre Agência e Turismo, and others. His son, Belarmino da Ascenção Marta Filho, was a partner from Pastifício Selmi since 2005, and the company lent money for Belarmino family and companies. In 2017, Belarmino Filho fought with Ricardo Selmi and was expelled.

== Incidents ==
=== 2001 strike ===
In 2001, during the government of Marta Suplicy (PT), several companies, including three of Belarmino's companies, began a strike action due lack of payments from São Paulo prefecture. According to Suplicy, Belarmino and the other businessmen from the sector were using the strike to force the government to pay subsidy to their companies. Belarmino was also owning money for the State from loans taken during Celso Pitta (PTN) government and did not renew his bus fleet since 1998. The other three businessmen that had the monopoly of transportation in São Paulo also suffered from irregularities, and the government asked them not to renew their bidding. On 22 May 2002, Suplicy agreed to pay R$ 1.9 million to the companies to avoid new strikes.

=== Investigations ===
In 2008, an investigation about buses cartels culminated in the prison of Belarmino da Ascenção Marta Filho, but the evidences collected were annulated by the Superior Court of Justice and the case was archived.

In 2024, Belarmino was investigated in Campinas for administrative impropriety, as 67% of the bus companies from the city were owned by him.

=== Kidnapping ===
Belarmino was kidnapped by three men dressed as cops on 8 October 2016 at Frango Assado restaurant in SP-330, Louveira. He had just dismissed his body guards for a car trip. The criminals were asking R$20 million for his release. He was held captive on the rural area of Parelheiros, South Zone of São Paulo. On 7 November, the Civil Police broke into the captivity, freed Belarmino and arrested Jorge Luiz Talarico, José Hilton dos Santos and Ronaldo Paulino. The three of them have worked as security guards for Belarmino, and Talarico was the chief of investigation of the 99th Police District. Another two men were arrested later. During his captivity, he was threatened with a chainsaw. Talarico died before trial, but all other suspects were convicted.

=== Frozen assets ===
In 1997, Bamerindus Bank prosecuted Grupo Belarmino for not paying a multimillionaire debt. The bank also accused the businessman of creating a financial network to get loans and defraud creditors, leaving a huge debt behind when their small businesses bankrupted. In 2024, the Court of Justice of São Paulo blocked R$56.7 million from his assets to pay the debt.

== Personal life ==
Belarmino is married with Nivia Marta and has two children, Belarmino da Ascenção Marta Filho and Carla da Ascenção Marta.

== Tributes ==
On 12 November 2012, Belarmino was named an honorary citizen from Tatuí by the Councilor José Tarcísio Ribeiro.
