= Bompreço =

Brazilian retail

Big Bompreço

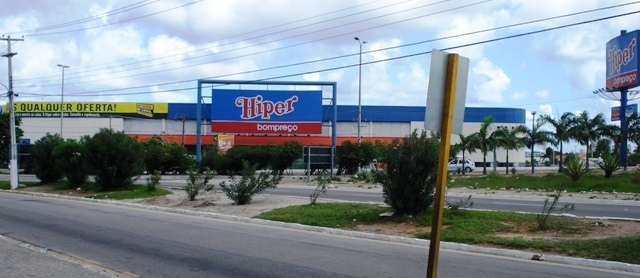
- Formerly: Hiper Bompreço, Walmart Brasil
- Type: Subsidiary
- Industry: Retail
- Founder: Pedro Paes Medonça
- Headquarters: Recife, Pernambuco, Brazil
- Number of locations: 90+ Stores
- Area served: Northeast
- Products: Food, drinks, groceries, clothing, footwear, beauty products, jewelry, accessories, furniture, decor, bedding, bath, electronics, appliances, housewares, toys, games, books, movies, musical instruments, pet supplies, baby products, hygiene products, health products, school and office supplies, tools, gifts, garden center, pharmacy, photo center, and auto center
- Owner: Carrefour Brazil
- Website: www.bompreco.com.br

Bompreço was a chain of supermarkets and hypermarkets in Brazil. Its name means "good price" in Portuguese. As of 2022, Bompreço is owned by Carrefour Brazil.

Bompreço operated mainly in northeastern Brazil, in the Bahia and Pernambuco states of Brazil.

The operating company, Walmart Brasil, had its headquarters in Barueri, São Paulo State. Prior to the buyout by Walmart, Bompreço S.A. Supermercados do Nordeste, headquartered in Ipatinga, Recife, Pernambuco, was owned by the Dutch retailer Ahold (now Ahold Delhaize).

== See also ==
- List of supermarkets
- João Carlos Paes Mendonça
