= Resistência (dog) =

Brazilian dog famous for being a mascot of the Free Lula Movement

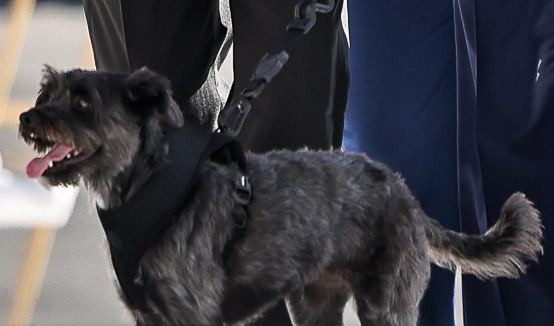
- Resistência in 2023
- Other names: First Dog, First Dog of Brazil
- Breed: Mongrel
- Sex: Female
- Born: c. 2018; Curitiba, Paraná, Brazil
- Owners: Luiz Inácio Lula da Silva, Rosângela Lula da Silva
- Residence: Palácio da Alvorada (2023–present)
- Appearance: Black

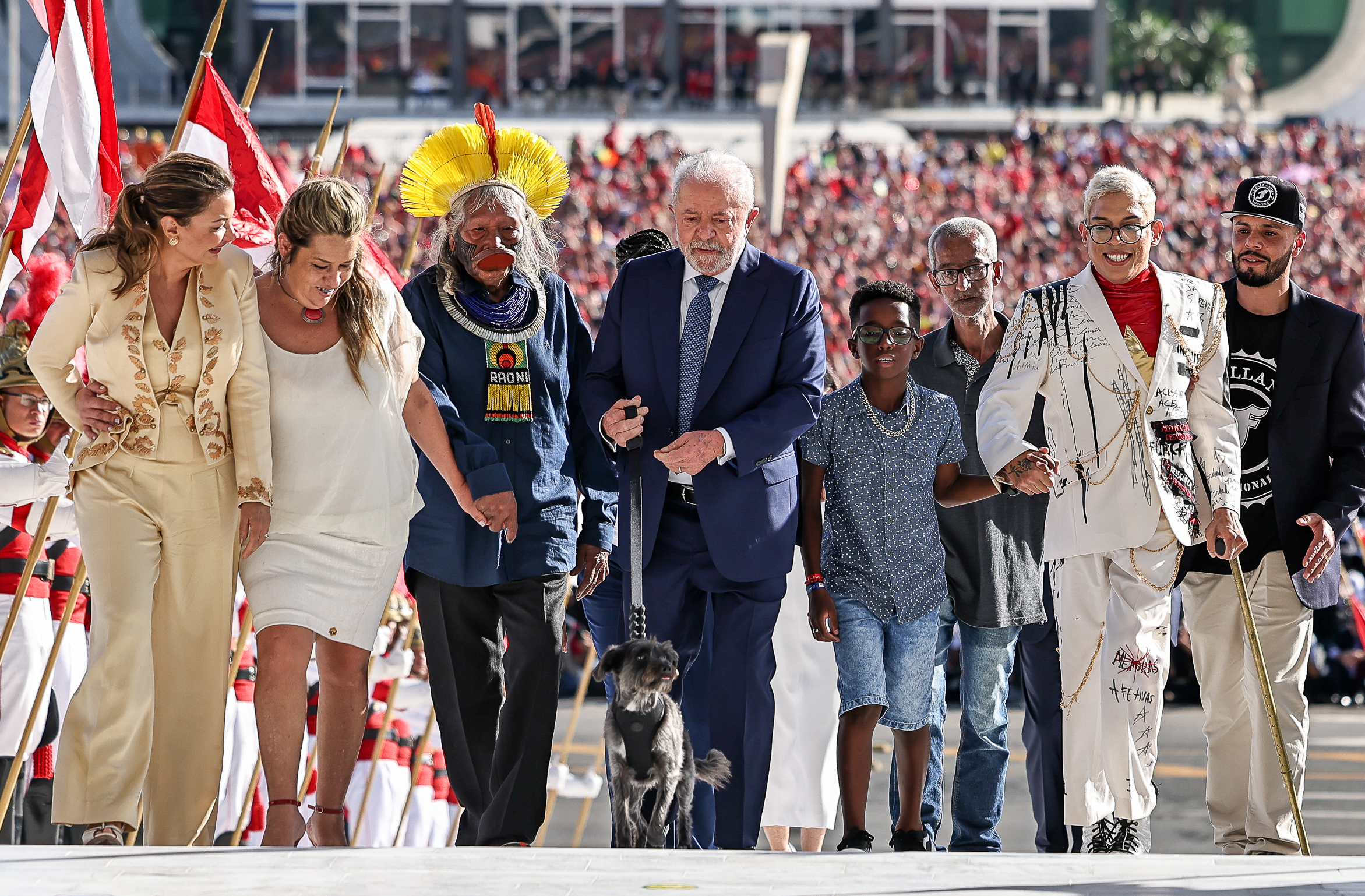
Resistência climbing the entrance ramp of the Planalto Palace during the third inauguration of Luiz Inácio Lula da Silva.

Resistência Lula da Silva, or simply Resistência (lit. 'Resistance'), is the female pet mongrel of Luiz Inácio Lula da Silva and his wife Rosângela. She was the first animal to climb the entrance ramp of the Planalto Palace during a Brazilian presidential inauguration ceremony. Resistência received the title of Canine Ambassador for Animal Adoption in 2022 during the National Animal Rights Day.

== History ==
Resistência wandered between the tents of the camp "Lula Livre" in Curitiba where the president was imprisoned. Previously, she used to walk among cars around the Federal Police Superintendence area. Two metalworkers started to care for the dog during the vigil, and she started to live among the demonstrators. After falling ill, she was adopted by Rosângela (Janja), Lula's girlfriend at the time. Lula did not meet Resistência until after his release. The dog inspired the creation of an animal rights sector within the Brazilian Workers' Party.

On January 1, 2023, Resistência took the ramp at the inauguration of President Lula, together with representatives of civil society, since Jair Bolsonaro did not pass the sash to Lula as is the custom.

She is our lucky charm I would say. Resistência was found and adopted by the vigil. She stayed in the vigil for a few months, but as it was very cold in Curitiba, she got sick, and I said: "Come on, Resistência, you're going to my house". She came with me. I wrote this in a letter to Lula: "Look, we have a new girl". And then the people at the vigil said, "Resistência will go up the ramp of the Planalto. Resistência will be there."

— Rosângela Lula da Silva in an interview with Fantástico in November 2022.

== See also ==
- List of individual dogs
