= Jacomar =

Supermarket chain from Curitiba, Brazil

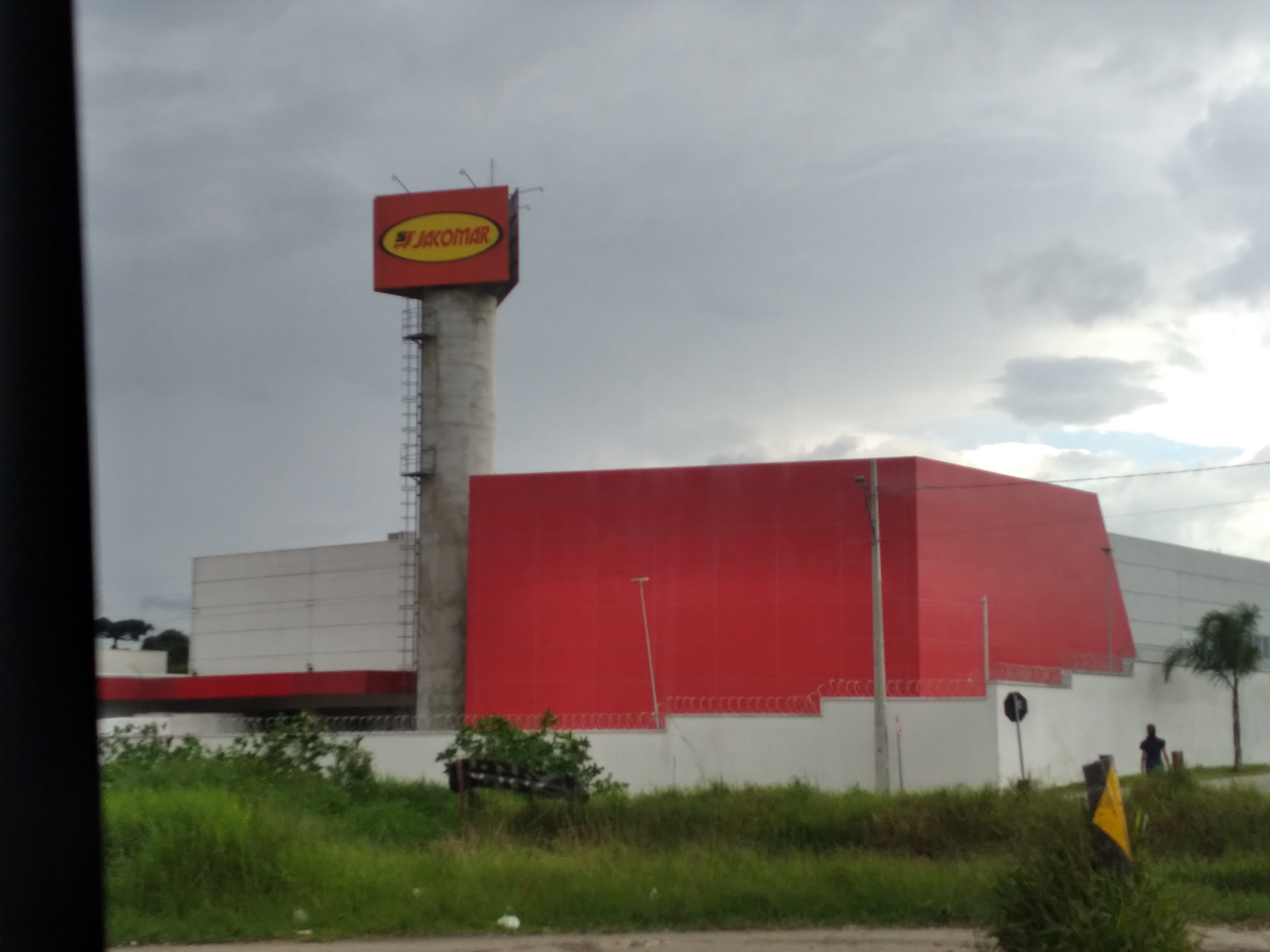
- A Jacomar store
- Type: Private
- Industry: Retail
- Founded: December 1966; 59 years ago
- Founder: Jacob Pankratz Filho
- Headquarters: Curitiba, Brazil
- Area served: Paraná
- Products: supermarket, gas station
- Website: www.jacomar.com.br

Jacomar is a Brazilian supermarket chain from Curitiba, created by Jacob Pankratz Filho and his wife, Maria Pankratz. It is currently controlled by Grupo Jacomar, managed by their children.

== History ==
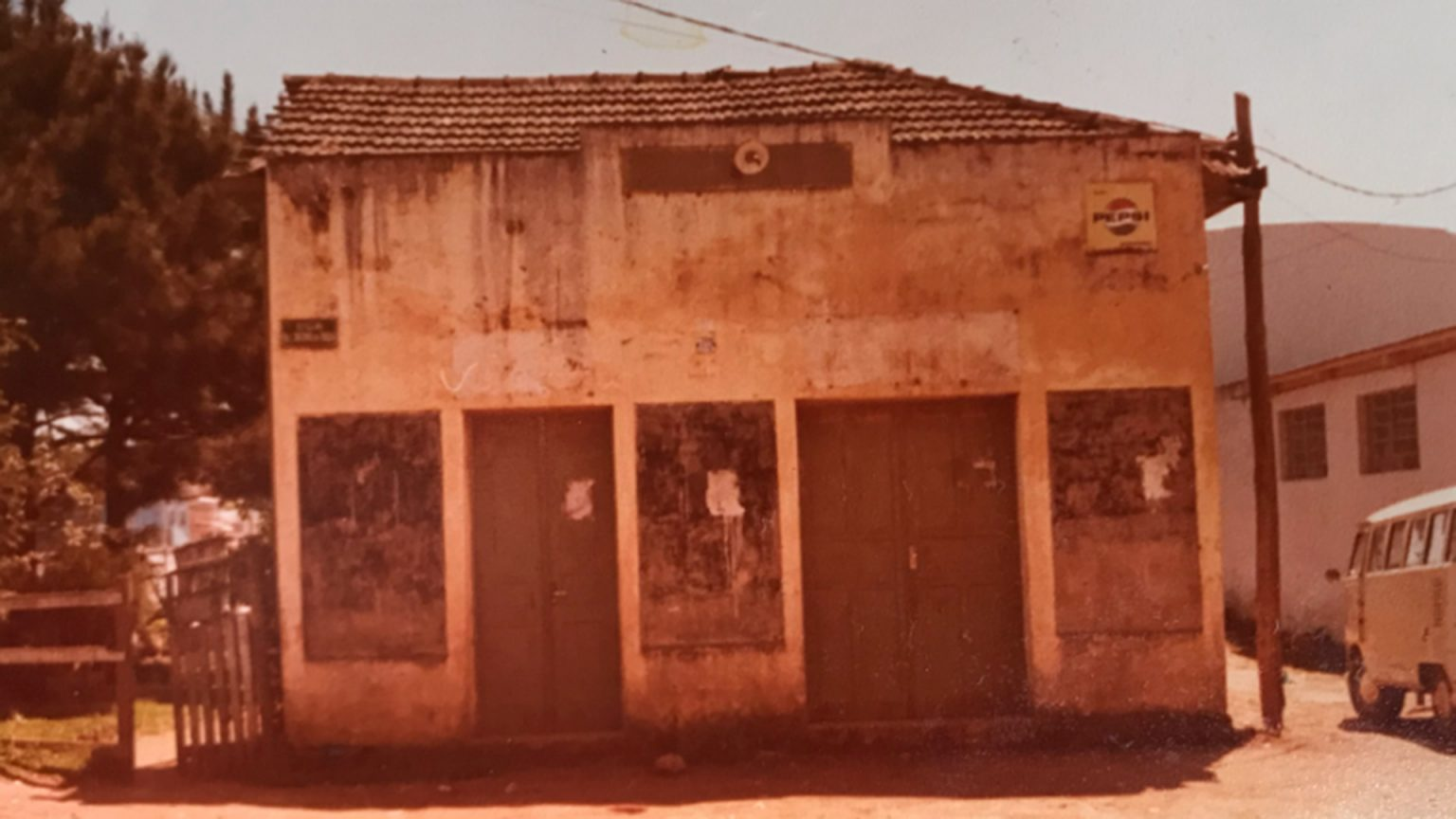
First unit of Jacob Pankratz Filho warehouse

Originally a warehouse, it was created by Jacob Pankratz Filho on Boqueirão in December 1966 and bore his name. Eventually, the warehouse was renamed as Casa Holandesa. Business thrived and in October 1976 he and his wife, Maria Pankratz (married on 12 April 1958), transformed the warehouse into a store and named it Jacomar, a combination between "Jacob" and "Maria". In 1984, they opened their second store in São José dos Pinhais.

In March 1993, they bought the Cooperativa Mista do Boqueirão which became their first supermarket. The store was important for the company, as it became its administrative and stock center. In September 1998, the Boqueirão unit was rebuilt with a more modern look. It was revitalized again in October 2024, with the investment of R$ 15 million. In 2004, Jacomar sales grew between 3% and 5%, but in 2005 the supermarket was impacted by the fall of commodities prices. Their profit margin retroacted to 2004's.

On 18 May 2020, during the COVID-19 pandemic, one employee from Xaxim unit was diagnosed with COVID-19 and spread to another 7 people. In 2021, Jacomar and other 33 supermarkets donated 28 monitors and 4 respirators to the Paraná state.

In September 2026, Grupo Jacomar had 21 suparmarkets and 3 gas stations in Paraná state. They operate maily in Curitiba, but also in São José dos Pinhais, Piraquara, Pinhais and Fazenda Rio Grande.

== Work culture ==
The supermarket is known for not opening on Sundays, as Jacob believed this is a day to spend with the family. Jacomar is the first supermarket from Paraná to obtain the Certified Age Friendly Employer (CAFE) from Age Friendly Institute.

== Legal issues and incidents ==
On 13 September 2008, the Jacomar manager from São José dos Pinhais was shot dead by two men.

Between 18 and 20 December 2009, Curitiba's Health Surveillance collected food products, such as cheeses, ham, and mortadella, from Jacomar Salgado Filho for not specifying their shelf life and food chain.

In 2023, Jacomar was convicted by the Superior Labor Court in paying R$10,000 to one of their employees for gender discrimination.
