= Atacadão =

Brazilian wholesale trade network

Atacadão S.A.

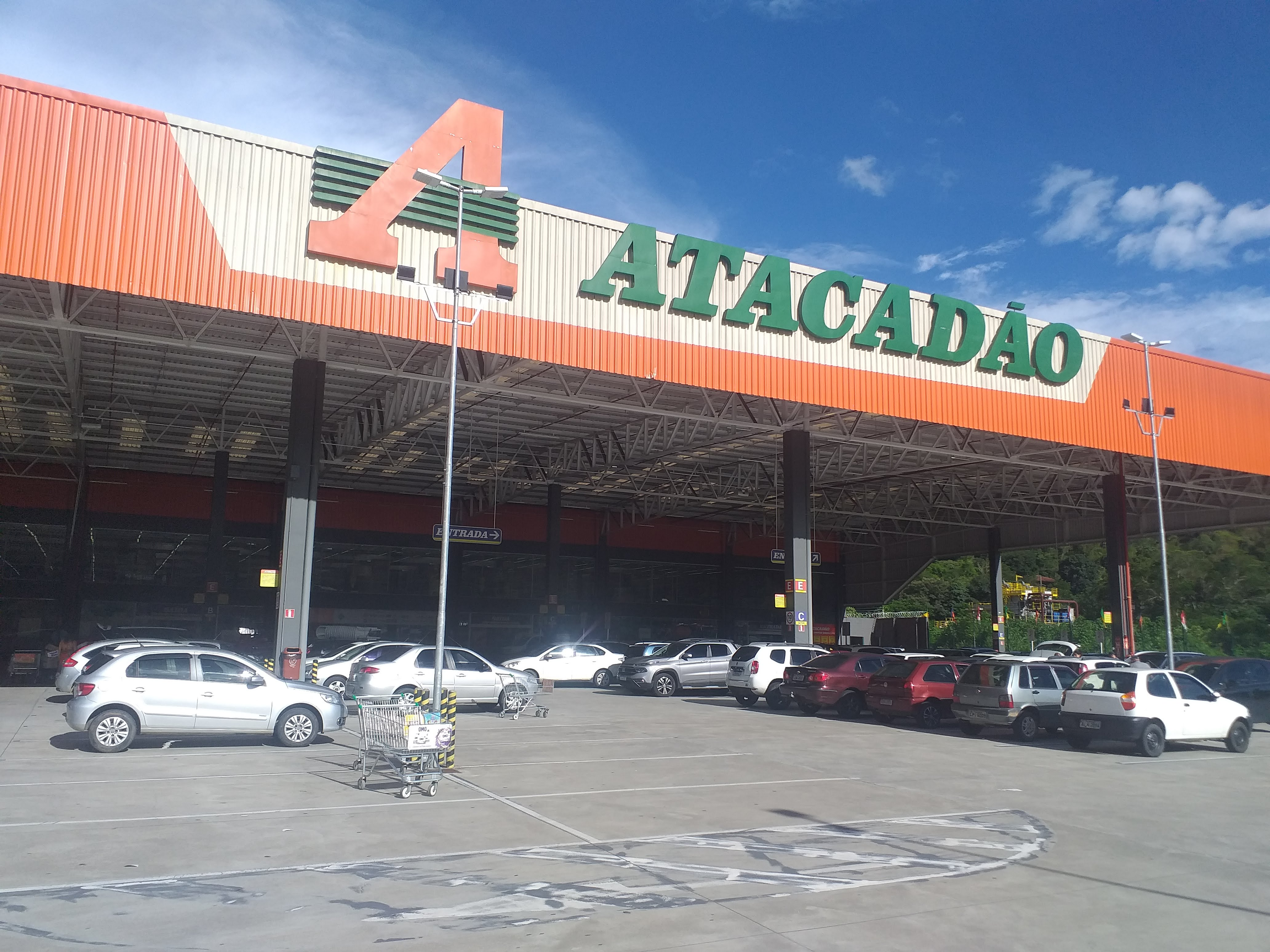
- Atacadão in Nova Friburgo, Brazil
- Type: Public company
- Traded as: B3: CRFB3
- Industry: Retail
- Founded: 1960
- Headquarters: São Paulo, Brazil
- Area served: Latin America; North Africa
- Key people: (Chairman &CEO)
- Products: Hypermarkets
- Revenue: ▲US$ 7.3 million (2012)
- Parent: Carrefour
- Website: www.atacadao.com.br

Atacadão is a Brazilian chain of warehouse stores. It was established by Alcides Parizotto and then became property of the Lima family and the executives Farid Curi and Herberto Uli Schmeil. In 2007, it was bought by Carrefour for R$2,2 billion Reais. In 2010, the company has 102 stores and 7 distribution centers in 26 Brazilian states. The company competes with Assaí Atacadista, owned by Cassinò. Atacadão also runs hypermarkets in Morocco and France, where it is present along with its parent company Carrefour.

On 12 April 2022 the company completed 60 years of history with more than 60 thousand employees.

== History ==
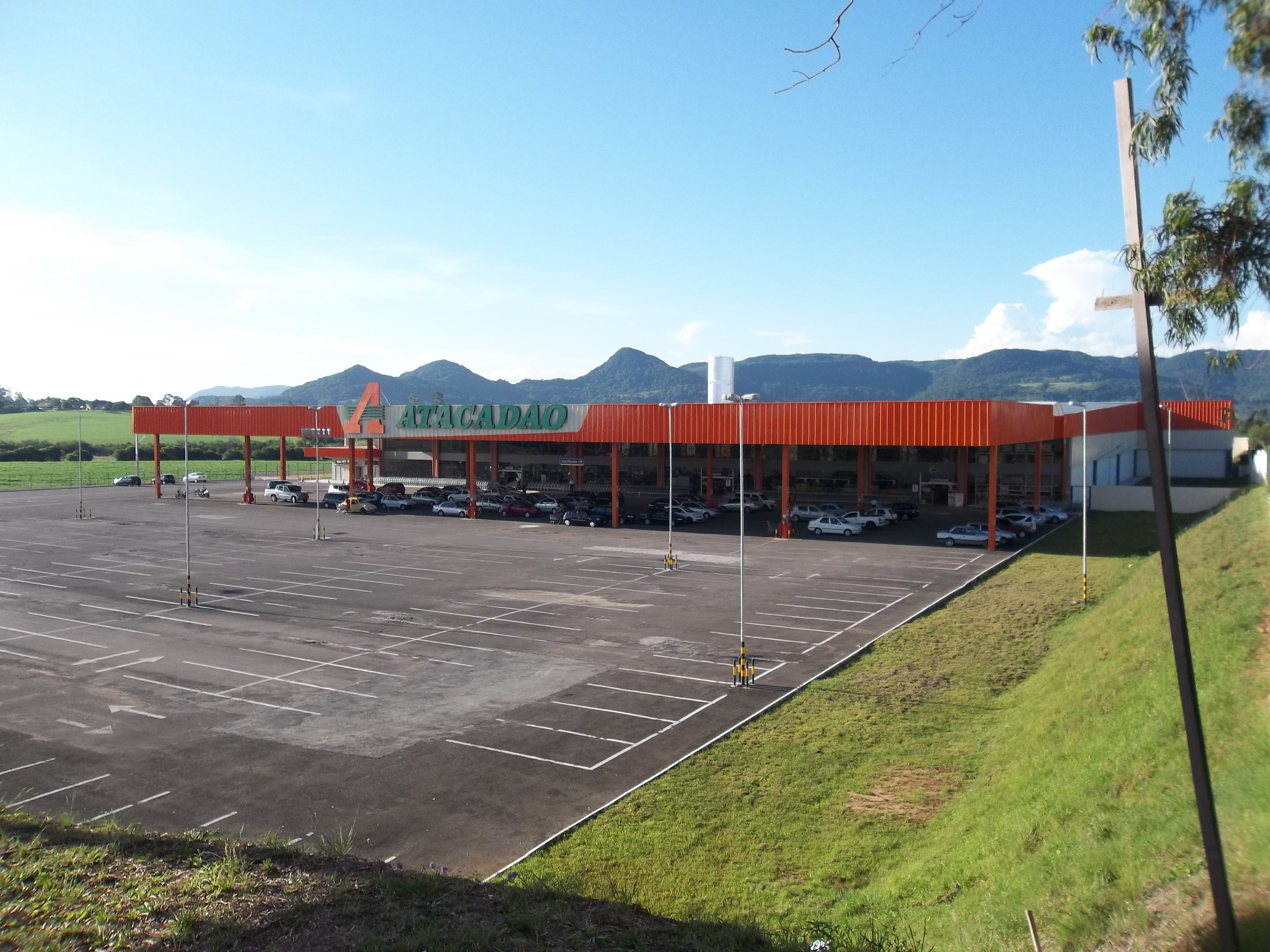
Atacadão store in Santa Maria, in Rio Grande do Sul. Supermarket located between the neighborhoods São José and Camobi.

Atacadão was founded in 1962, in the city of Maringá in Paraná, by Alcides Parizotto, who was in charge of the network until 1991, the year he left the organization, and in which the company was later acquired by the Lima family and executives Farid Curi and Herberto Uli Schmeil, when it was purchased in 2007 by Carrefour Group for R$2.2 billion reais.

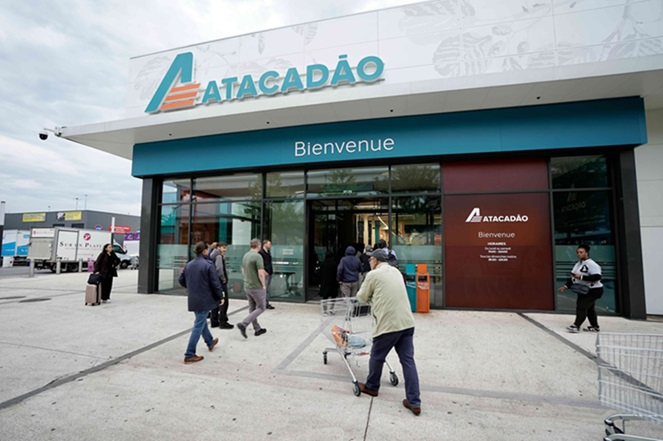
Atacadão store opened in France in 2024

In 2020, the retail chain Carrefour acquired 30 stores from Makro, aiming to increase Atacadão's market share. The acquisition cost Carrefour R$1.95 billion and included 14 gas stations in the package. The transaction would allow Atacadão to expand its presence in Rio de Janeiro and the Northeast.

In January 2023, Carrefour announced that it would change one of its stores in the commune of Sevran, France, as part of its strategy to focus on low-income populations. On January 16, the city's mayor, Stéphane Blanchet, called Carrefour's decision disastrous. In the following months, the city launched a petition, promoted discussions, and scheduled a demonstration for March 11th. However, the mayor of the city of Aulnay-sous-Bois, Bruno Beschizza, embraced the idea, but the commune's population also launched a petition. Despite the petitions from the population of this French commune, the first French Atacadão store was inaugurated on June 20, 2024, in Aulnay-sous-Bois.

On 20 June 2024, the first store opened in France at the O'Parinor shopping center in Aulnay-sous-Bois, Seine-Saint-Denis, marking a response to the impact of inflation on the purchasing power of the French population.

Atacadão Maroc was launched in 1992, replacing Metro Maroc and Carrefour Maxi after LabelVie, a local Moroccan group (which owns Atacadão Maroc), opened its first location in Casablanca and Salé. Atacadão Maroc operates 20 locations as of 2025.

== Former operations ==
=== Argentina ===
The name was replaced by Carrefour Maxi.

=== Colombia ===
The name was replaced by Carrefour Maxi and later Maxi. On October 18, 2012, Carrefour's assets were sold to the Chilean company Cencosud, which closed its four stores (Bogotá - Ciudad Bolívar, Bogotá - Calle 13, Soacha - San Mateo, and Apolo - Medellín) in March 2013. These stores have now been rebranded as Easy.
