= Grated cheese =

Form of cheese

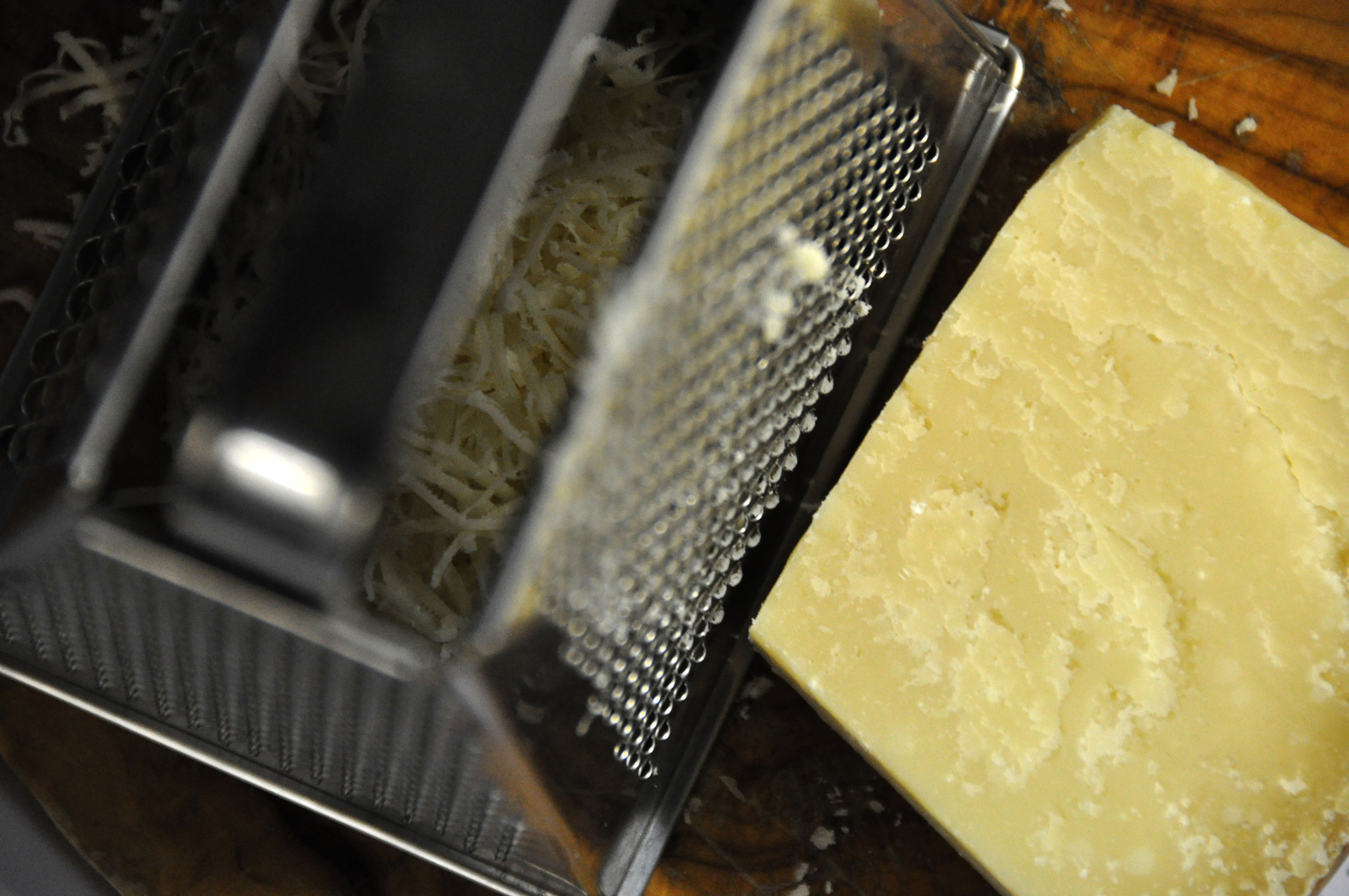
Parmesan cheese being grated

Grated cheese is cheese that has been rubbed against a grater in order to cut it into many small pieces. Hard cheeses such as parmesan are usually grated, and grating such cheeses can improve flavor as it adds surface area. Grated cheese is similar to shredded cheese, with the primary difference being texture; grated cheese is smooth and fine, while shredded cheese is cut into larger pieces.

== List of commonly grated cheeses ==
- Parmesan (as mentioned above)
- Cheddar cheeses
- Pecorino romano
- Grana Padano
- Red Leicester
- Beemster cheese
- Monterey Jack
- Provolone
- Emmental cheese
