= Luisa Mell =

Brazilian actress

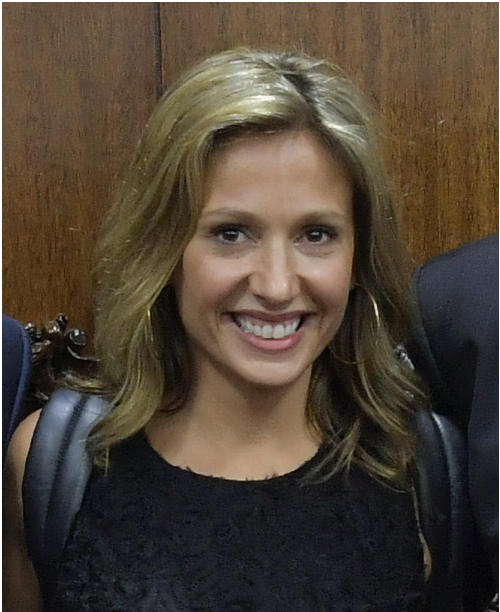
- Mell in 2018
- Born: Marina Zatz de Camargo; 19 September 1978 (age 47); São Paulo, Brazil
- Occupations: Actress; television presenter; animal rights activist; businesswoman
- Years active: 1998–present
- Spouse: Gilberto Zaborowsky (m. 2011; div. 2021)
- Children: 1
- Website: luisamell.com.br

Marina Zatz de Camargo (born 19 September 1978), known professionally as Luisa Mell, is a Brazilian actress, television presenter, animal rights activist, and businesswoman.

Mell's career began at the age of nineteen when she appeared in a sitcom aired on the Sunday program Domingo Legal (SBT). Then she went to Rede TV!, where she presented programs. The best known is the Late Show, which had the purpose of rescuing animals from the streets or under mistreatment and arranging their adoption. Animal rights activist, Mell was responsible for passing a law banning the use of animals in circus shows and the immediate sacrifice of dogs collected by Zoonoses.

In May, 2013, she launched her official website. The website is intended to provide veterinary information, rescue stories, appeals for lost dogs and the saga of the girl as a vegetarian. In February, 2015, she founded the Luisa Mell, which mainly works to rescue injured or at risk animals, recovery and adoption. It also maintains a shelter with dozens of animals, between dogs and cats, all rescued from the streets, where they are protected, fed and given the chance to be adopted.

== Personal life ==
She graduated in law and theatre. Despite being part of a Jewish family, she began to attend the kabbalah after meeting with Madonna.

She has a son, Enzo (born February 13, 2015), with her husband Gilberto Zaborowsky, and has been married since 2011. Gilberto is a businessman and has two children from a previous relationship, Lara and Eduardo.

She is vegan and raised her child vegan.

== Main works ==
TV:

- Família Pimenta as Dora (1998; segment on the Domingo Legal of SBT)
- Objeto do Desejo as presenter (2001; segment on the Noite Afora of RedeTV!)
- TV Fama as presenter (2002–2006; RedeTV!)
- Late Show / Late Show Viva Mundo as presenter (2002–2008; RedeTV!)
- Araguaia as Cristina "Cris" Gouveia (2011; Rede Globo)
- Estação Pet as presenter (2011; TV Gazeta)
- Luisa Mell Salva as presenter (2014; segment on the Domingo Legal of SBT)
- SOS Pet as presenter (2014; segment on the Mundo Pet of SBT)

Film:

- Sete Vidas as Ana (2007; Short)
