= Preta case =

2005 killing of a dog in Pelotas, Brazil

- Location: Pelotas, Rio Grande do Sul, Brazil
- Date: March 9, 2005
- Attack type: Cruelty to animals, Dragging death
- Victim: Preta
- Accused: Fernando Siqueira Carvalho Marcelo Ortiz Schuch Alberto Conceição da Cunha Neto

On the night of March 9, 2005, a black dog named Preta, who was pregnant, was tied to the bumper of a car and dragged through the Brazilian city of Pelotas by 3 men: Fernando Siqueira Carvalho, Marcelo Ortiz Schuch, and Alberto Conceição da Cunha Neto.

== Repercussion ==
The case gained repercussions throughout the country and also abroad. In Brazil, specifically, the case generated commotion in the population throughout the state of Rio Grande do Sul and gained national repercussions when it was reported on Fantástico, on national television, on March 17, 2005, later appearing then in several newspapers, magazines and TV programs, a fact that generated protests in several other centers in addition to the state. In view of the case, a public civil action was opened.

“Collectivities are subject to aggression against non-patrimonial values, bundled in them, in a diffuse way, including among them a feeling of respect for the lives of beings close to human beings. Case of the "Black Dog", savagely killed, with disintegration of her body and fetuses, dragged through the central streets of Pelotas, in plain sight, for the mere amusement of its authors, generating notorious social commotion. Aggression to feelings that are indispensable to collectivities, without which life in society becomes impossible.”

— — Excerpt from the Public Civil Action

== Conviction ==
The conviction of the accused, which occurred years later, brought the case back to the media, and would have been based on the fact that the killing of the dog would have brought psychological damage to the local population. Alberto Conceição da Cunha Neto, for having a criminal record, received the highest sentence among the three accused, being sentenced in 2007 to one year of detention in a semi-open regime. Alberto Neto was ordered to pay compensation for collective moral damages in the amount of R$6,035.04, which must be directed to the city's municipal kennel. Alberto would have already responded to an investigation for mistreatment of animals and illegal possession of a weapon in 2003, when he shot and killed a boxer dog in neighboring Praia do Laranjal.
