= Assaí Atacadista =

Brazilian wholesale store chain

Sendas Distribuidora S.A.

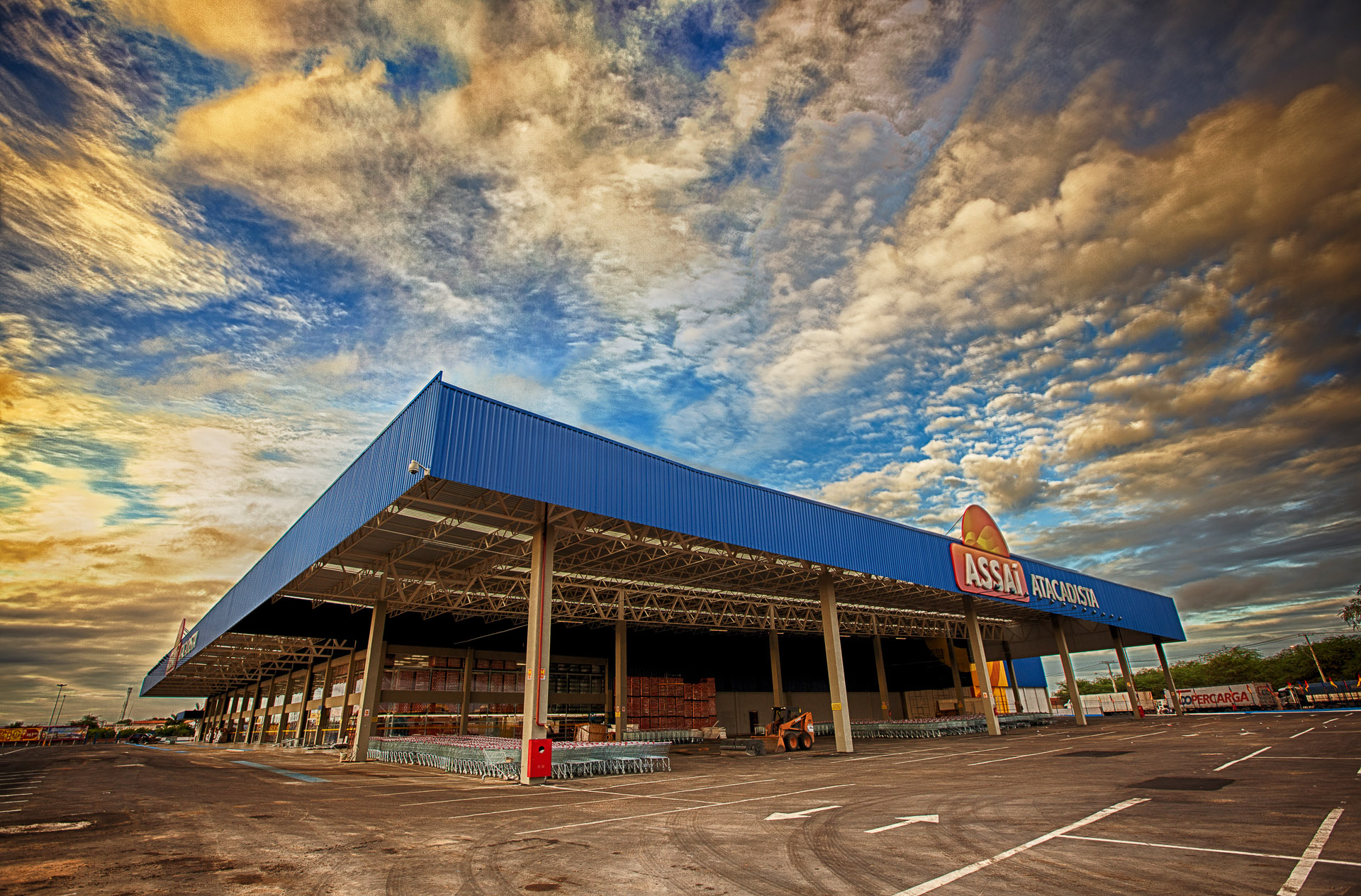
- Trade name: Assaí Atacadista
- Company type: Public
- Traded as: B3: ASAI3
- Industry: Retail
- Founded: October 1974; 51 years ago
- Headquarters: São Paulo, Brazil
- Key people: Belmiro Goimes (CEO)
- Revenue: ▲US$ 15.3 billion (2025)
- Net income: ▼US$ 126.0 million (2025)
- Website: www.assai.com.br

Assaí Atacadista is a Brazilian chain of warehouse stores. It was established in 1974 by Rodolfo Jungi Nagai.

In 2007, it was bought by GPA for 175 million reais. In 2022, the company launched 60 stores.

Currently, Assaí Atacadista has 302 stores in Brazil, in 24 states (except Santa Catarina and Rio Grande do Sul), and also the Federal District. It is the second largest retail company of Brazil.

On 23 May 2019, Rallye S.A., owner of Groupe Casino, which owned a majority stake in GPA, declared bankruptcy protection in an effort to maintain its high debt costs. Casino later announced that same day that the bankruptcy would not affect any of their subsidiaries and that operations would continue normally.

In 2024, Casino USA filed for Chapter 15 bankruptcy.
