= Cologne (pigeon) =

Royal Air Force pigeon

Cologne was a pigeon who received the Dickin Medal in 1947 from the People's Dispensary for Sick Animals for bravery in service during the Second World War. He served with the National Pigeon Service as Pigeon NURP 39.NPS 144 and carried out over 100 missions with Bomber Command and had previously homed successfully from several downed aircraft before the incident which earned the Dickin Medal. Cologne's citation read – “For homing from a crashed aircraft over Cologne although seriously wounded, whilst serving with the RAF in 1943”.

== See also ==
- List of individual birds
