= Crumstone Irma =

WWII search and rescue dog

- Other names: Irma, The Blitz Dog
- Species: Canis familiaris
- Breed: Alsatian
- Born: South Stoke, Goring-on-Thames
- Resting place: PDSA Animal Cemetery, Ilford; 51°35′13″N 0°2′45″W
- Nationality: United Kingdom
- Notable role: Search and rescue dog
- Owner: Mrs Margaret Griffin
- Awards: Dickin Medal

Crumstone Irma, a.k.a. Irma, was a German Shepherd Dog who assisted in the rescue of 191 people trapped under blitzed buildings while serving with London's Civil Defence Services during the Second World War. During this period she worked with her handler and owner, Mrs Margaret Griffin, and another dog named Psyche. Noted for her ability to tell if buried victims were dead or alive, she was awarded the Dickin Medal in 1945, and is buried at the PDSA Animal Cemetery, Ilford.

== Rescue career ==
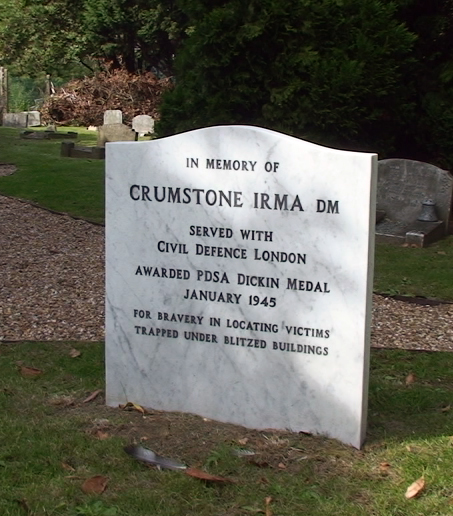
Irma's gravestone in Ilford

Irma was initially used as a messenger dog to relay messages when telephone lines were down. She was teamed with another dog from the same kennel, named Crumstone Psyche (commonly referred to as Psyche), and they were both retrained to become search and rescue dogs. The pair of dogs were handled by their owner, Mrs Margaret Griffin, and together the two dogs found 233 people, of which 21 were found alive.

In one incident, Irma refused to give up on the scent of two girls who were trapped under a fallen building for two days.

Irma specialised in being able to bark differently depending on whether the buried victim was dead or alive. This included one occasion when Irma signalled with an "alive" bark and rescuers dug out a victim who was apparently dead. Irma was proved correct, as the man eventually stirred.

Following their work during the Second World War they became demonstration dogs along with Crumstone Storm at the Dog School in Gloucester.

== Awards ==
She was awarded the Dickin Medal on 12 January 1945 with a citation that read "For being responsible for the rescue of persons trapped under blitzed buildings while serving with the Civil Defences of London." Irma, along with Jet was one of two dogs to participate in the London Victory Celebrations of 1946 held in Pall Mall, London on 8 June 1946. Both wore their Dickin Medals during the parade.

Irma's owner, Mrs Margaret Griffin, was awarded the British Empire Medal for her work in training her dogs and accompanying them on rescue missions.

The Dickin Medal is often referred to as the animal metaphorical equivalent of the Victoria Cross.

== See also ==
- List of individual dogs
