= Princess (pigeon) =

Pigeon receiver of the Dickin Medal

Princess (42WD593) was a pigeon who received the Dickin Medal in 1946 from the People's Dispensary for Sick Animals for bravery in service during the Second World War. Princess was cited after returning from a special mission to Crete to her loft at RAF Alexandria, a distance of around 500 miles primarily over sea, carrying valuable information. The citation describes the flight as one of the finest performances in the war record of the Pigeon Service.

== See also ==
- List of individual birds
