= Tommy (pigeon) =

Pigeon receiver of the Dickin Medal

Tommy (NURP.41.DHZ56) was a pigeon who received the Dickin Medal in 1946 from the People's Dispensary for Sick Animals for bravery in service during the Second World War. Tommy was cited for delivering a valuable message from the Netherlands to Lancashire during difficult conditions while serving with the National Pigeon Service in July 1942.

== See also ==
- List of individual birds
