= Salty and Roselle =

Guide dogs at the World Trade Center during 9/11 attacks

Roselle with owner Michael Hingson and Omar Rivera with Salty

Salty and Roselle were two guide dogs who were with their owners in the World Trade Center during the September 11 terror attacks in New York City. They each guided their owners out of the burning towers before the buildings collapsed, feats which were later recognized when they were awarded the Dickin Medal by the British charity the People's Dispensary for Sick Animals. Roselle went on to be posthumously named American Hero Dog of the Year 2011 by American Humane, and has a book written about her.

== Salty ==
Salty
- Species: Canis familiaris
- Breed: Labrador Retriever
- Sex: Male
- Born: December 12, 1996
- Died: March 28, 2008 (aged 11)
- Nationality: United States
- Occupation: Guide dog
- Years active: 1998–2008
- Owner: Omar Rivera
- Appearance: Yellow coat
- Awards: Dickin Medal; Partners in Courage award

Salty (December 12, 1996 – March 28, 2008) was trained as a guide dog in early 1998 by Guiding Eyes for the Blind in Yorktown Heights, New York. Part of his training included taking trips on the New York City Subway and getting used to traffic in the Bronx. Omar Rivera was introduced to Salty by Salty's instructor, Caroline McCabe-Sandler.

When the attacks occurred on September 11, 2001, Salty and his owner, Omar Rivera, found themselves on the 71st floor. Rivera was working at the headquarters of the Port Authority of New York and New Jersey, in Tower 1 of the World Trade Center. After refusing to leave Rivera's side, Salty and Rivera's supervisor, Donna Enright, led him to safety.

== Roselle ==
Roselle
- Species: Dog
- Breed: Labrador Retriever
- Sex: Female
- Born: March 12, 1998; San Rafael, California
- Died: June 26, 2011 (aged 13)
- Nationality: United States
- Occupation: Guide dog
- Years active: 1999–2007
- Owner: Michael Hingson
- Appearance: Yellow coat
- Awards: Dickin Medal; American Hero Dog of the Year 2011
- http://www.rosellefoundation.org

Roselle (March 12, 1998 – June 26, 2011) was born in San Rafael, California, on March 12, 1998, at the Guide Dogs for the Blind. She was moved to Santa Barbara, California, to be raised by Kay and Ted Stern. After this she was returned to Guide Dogs for the Blind so that she could be trained as a guide dog. Roselle and her owner, Michael Hingson, first met on November 22, 1999. She was Hingson's fifth guide dog.

Roselle was asleep under her owner's desk on the 78th floor in Tower 1 of the World Trade Center when the attack commenced. She was awakened by American Airlines Flight 11 impacting some fifteen floors above them. Roselle calmly helped Hingson to stairwell B, despite the smoke, confusion and noise surrounding her.

She led her owner and 30 other people down 1,463 steps out of the tower. After descending over half the distance, they passed the firemen who were heading up. The descent took just over an hour. Just after they exited the tower, Tower 2 collapsed, sending debris flying. Hingson later said, "While everyone ran in panic, Roselle remained totally focused on her job, while debris fell around us, and even hit us, Roselle stayed calm." Once clear, Roselle led her owner to the safety of a subway station, where they helped a woman who had been blinded by falling debris.

After the attacks, Hingson changed careers from a computer salesman to working for the Guide Dogs for the Blind as Public Affairs Director. Hingson and Roselle appeared on numerous television shows including Larry King Live, the CBS Morning Show and Regis and Kelly. They also appeared on a float during the 2002 Rose Parade in Pasadena, CA.

In 2004, Roselle was diagnosed with immune-mediated thrombocytopenia, but medications were able to control the condition. In March 2007 she retired from guiding after it was discovered that the medication was beginning to damage her kidneys. She continued to live with Hingson, who was assigned a new guide dog, Africa. On June 24, 2011, Hingson suspected that something was wrong with Roselle and took her to her local vet, who diagnosed her with a stomach ulcer. Roselle died two days later on June 26, at 8:52 pm. In her memory, Hingson and Susy Flory wrote a book of his 9/11 experience entitled Thunder Dog: The True Story of a Blind Man, His Guide Dog, and the Triumph of Trust at Ground Zero which became a New York Times Bestseller. Michael and Karen Hingson subsequently set up Roselle's Dream Foundation, a 501(c)(3) charitable foundation to raise money to help blind people engage more fully in everyday life.

In 2020, the podcast This is Love spoke with Michael Hingson about his life with Roselle and their 9/11 experience.

== Dickin Medal, awards and other dedications ==
Salty and Roselle were awarded a joint Dickin Medal by the People's Dispensary for Sick Animals on March 5, 2002. It was only the second time that a joint medal had been awarded, the first time to Punch and Judy, a pair of Boxers in 1946. Salty and Roselle's medal citation reads, "For remaining loyally at the side of their blind owners, courageously leading them down more than 70 floors of the World Trade Center and to a place of safety following the terrorist attack on New York on September 11, 2001." This was not the only Dickin Medal to be awarded for actions related to the attacks; German Shepherd Apollo received a medal on behalf of all the work done by all search and rescue dogs following the attacks. The Dickin Medal is often referred to as the animal metaphorical equivalent of the Victoria Cross.

In addition to the Dickin Medal, Salty and Roselle were also each recognized by the British Guide Dogs for the Blind Association. Salty and Roselle were awarded a 'Partners in Courage' award by the Guiding Eyes for the Blind association. Roselle was posthumously named American Hero Dog of the Year in 2011 by the American Humane Society, beating seven other finalists in a public vote which saw more than 400,000 people vote

In 2009, Michael Gaither wrote and published a song titled "Roselle" about Roselle's life. It appeared on his album Dogspeed released in 2009.

== See also ==
- List of individual dogs
