= Mercury (pigeon) =

Bird honoured for bravery during World War II

Mercury was a pigeon who received the Dickin Medal in 1946 from the People's Dispensary for Sick Animals for bravery in service during the Second World War.

Mercury served with the National Pigeon Service (Special Section). It received the award for delivering secret messages involving a 480-mile (770 km) flight from Northern Denmark in 1942.

== See also ==
- List of individual birds
- Mercury the pigeon Valiant (film), 2005
