= NURP.43.CC.1418 =

Pigeon receiver of the Dickin Medal

NURP.43.CC.1418 was a pigeon who received the Dickin Medal in 1947 from the People's Dispensary for Sick Animals for bravery in service during the Second World War. NURP.43 received the citation for the fastest flight carrying a message from the 6th Airborne Division from Normandy on 7 June 1944, while serving with the National Pigeon Service.

== See also ==
- List of individual birds
