= Ricky (dog) =

Dog receiver of the Dickin Medal

- Species: Dog
- Breed: Border Collie/Old English Sheepdog cross
- Sex: Male
- Nationality: United Kingdom
- Employer: British Army
- Notable role: Dogs in warfare / Detection dog
- Years active: 1941–45
- Owner: The Litchfield family
- Awards: Dickin Medal

Ricky was a dog who received the Dickin Medal in 1947 from the People's Dispensary for Sick Animals for bravery in service during the Second World War.

== Military service ==
During the Second World War, Ricky, a Border Collie/Old English Sheepdog cross, was purchased by the father of Sheila Litchfield-Stander for seven shillings and six pence in Hastings while he was on Home Guard duty. The dog had previously been owned by a family who found themselves destitute. Soon afterwards, the Litchfield family moved to Sedlescombe, and again in 1941 they moved to Kent near to Biggin Hill airbase. After suffering from food shortages due to the ongoing rationing, Ricky was offered to the War Office to become a war dog.

He was assigned to Maurice Yelding (of the circus family) during his military service after graduating from the War Dogs Training School at Northaw in Hertfordshire. Yelding and Ricky were assigned to the 279th Field Company, Royal Engineers of the 15th (Scottish) Infantry Division. In December 1944, they were in the Netherlands where they were assigned to mine clearance along the canals near Nederweert. His handler would send letters home to his family, but they found out the duo's most famous action through a mention in dispatches. On 3 December 1944, Ricky found a number of land mines on the canals. During the process of mine clearing, his section commander was killed and Ricky himself suffered serious head injuries. Yelding expanded on this, saying that he and Ricky were both within 3 feet (0.91 m) of the mine when it exploded, and were in the middle of a mine field. Despite this, the pair continued to clear the mines from the surrounding area.

He was awarded a special collar by the War Office in recognition of his actions. After the end of the war, the military offered his family £25 to retain Ricky but they refused and he was returned home. It was the maximum amount allowed to be offered to retain a dog following war service.

Subsequently, his family has produced a range of dog products in his name, with Ricky's face on some of the packaging.

== Dickin medal ==
For his actions, Ricky was subsequently awarded the Dickin Medal for bravery by the People's Dispensary for Sick Animals. This is considered to be the animal's equivalent of the Victoria Cross. His award was announced alongside that of another dog, Brian, in March 1947. Their medals were presented to them by Air Chief Marshal Sir Frederick Bowhill.

== See also ==
- List of individual dogs
