= Kuga (dog) =

Australian military dog

Kuga (2007-2012) was a male Belgian Malinois military dog serving with the Australian Army. In 2011, Kuga was shot five times while grasping an insurgent fighter with his mouth, while on patrol in Khas Urozgan District, Afghanistan. Kuga died in 2012 of complications from the wounds despite veterinary treatment. In 2018, Kuga was posthumously awarded the Dickin Medal considered the Victoria Cross for animals.

== Early life ==
Kuga was born on 23 April 2007, and began training with the Australian Special Air Service Regiment (SASR) in January 2008, aged eight months.

Kuga was assigned to his handler (who can not be named for security reasons) in April 2009, and in June 2010 they deployed to Afghanistan for their first tour.

== Award situation ==
On 26 August 2011, during the pair's second tour, a SASR patrol was airlifted by helicopter into Khas Urozgan District in central Afghanistan, with a mission to locate a high value Taliban. Unknown to the patrol was that an ambush had been established by the Taliban fighters.

Kuga's handler, ranked Sergeant, let Kuga off-lead to patrol ahead and scout. Kuga went to the left and ahead, then down a creek bank. While Kuga was swimming across the creek, the Taliban engaged him with automatic gun fire. The handler observed rounds hitting the water around the dog, which continued to the other side of the creek. Kuga left the water and charged at the shooter, grasping onto him. The shooter then targeted Kuga directly with his AK-47 rifle, hitting him with at least one round. Kuga released his grip on the Taliban fighter who then escaped but not before targeting the dog again, ultimately hitting him five times: twice in the ear, once in the toe, once in the cheek (which exited through the neck) and once in the chest, which exited the shoulder and broke his upper-left leg. Kuga also received shrapnel wounds to his lower spine.

The Australian patrol had been well alerted to the ambush and began to engage the insurgents. The handler observed Kuga lying on the ground injured, near the bank of the stream. The handler called Kuga, who responded by slowly crawling to and entering the water and swimming over to rejoin the handler. The handler provided immediate first aid, and an emergency medical evacuation was called for.

== Aftermath ==
Kuga was evacuated and then treated by veterinary staff in Afghanistan, Germany and Australia, with the aim of rehabilitating him. However, the stress and injuries were too much, and he died on 24 July 2012. Kuga's death is officially recorded as ‘Died of Wounds’.

On 26 October 2018, Kuga was posthumously awarded the 71st Dickin Medal for bravery by the People's Dispensary for Sick Animals (PDSA). The medal was received on Kuga's behalf by a Victoria Cross recipient, Mark Donaldson VC, who was also a Special forces dog handler, along with another military dog, Odin. A spokesperson for the PDSA said, "The reason he got the Dickin Medal was he just was so courageous. He saved the lives, without doubt I think, of that patrol.” Donaldson said, "I personally am of the opinion that he saved lives that day. … The ambush would not have been sprung early enough so they would have stumbled into that killing zone. … If you take Kuga out of the equation … with reasonable doubt they wouldn't have known the enemy was there." Kuga's handler said, "I'm pretty proud of what Kuga did that day. He's the one who chose to go forward, he's the one who chose to take bullets for both me and my mates. Ultimately that enabled me to come home to my family."
