= NPS.42.NS.7524 =

Pigeon receiver of the Dickin Medal

NPS.42.NS.7524 was a pigeon who received the Dickin Medal in 1945 from the People's Dispensary for Sick Animals for bravery in service during the Second World War. The citation was received for delivering important messages on three occasions from enemy-held territory, in July 1942, May 1942, and July 1942, while serving with the Special Service on the continent.

== See also ==
- List of individual birds
