= Bing (dog) =

Dog receiver of the Dickin Medal

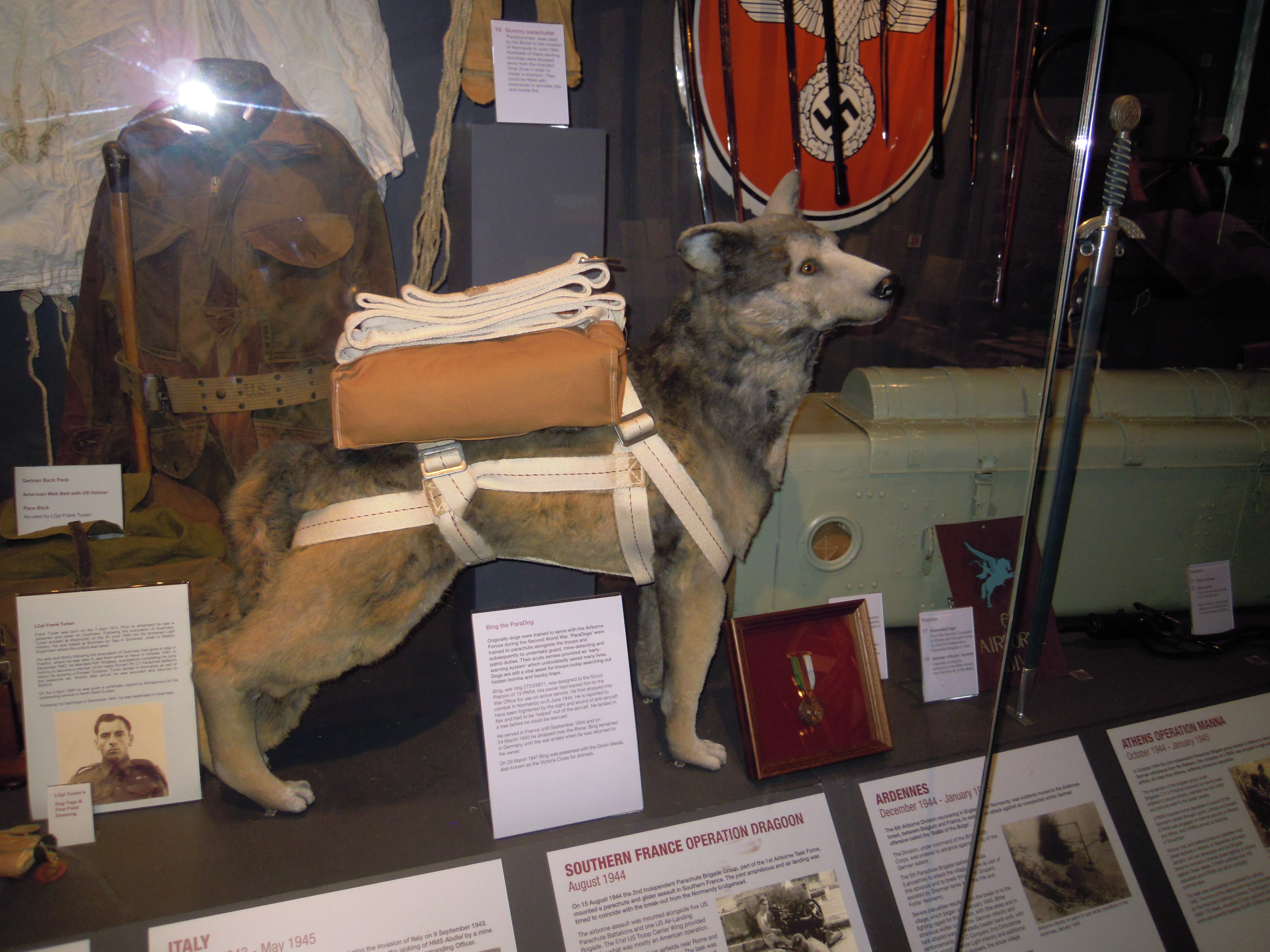
Bing the ParaDog displayed with his Dickin Medal at the Imperial War Museum Duxford

Bing (1942–44 – October 1955) was a dog who received the Dickin Medal in 1947 from the People's Dispensary for Sick Animals for bravery in service during the Second World War.

An Alsatian and Collie cross, Bing (originally named "Brian") was given to the army in 1944 when his owners, the Fetch family from Loughborough in Leicestershire, were no longer able to feed him due to rationing. He was trained at the Army War Dog Training School near Potters Bar in Hertfordshire. On joining the army. Bing was given the number in the war 2720/6871 and first saw action with his handler and trainer Lance Corporal Ken Bailey in a reconnaissance platoon with the 13th Parachute Battalion, part of the 6th Airborne Division, over Normandy on D-Day on 6 June 1944. He had to be "helped" out of the airplane with a piece of meat before landing in a tree and having to be rescued; he got stuck later he was wounded in action. His injuries were treated at the Vet Kennels near Stockport. Bing was trained to locate the enemy so he could protect military personnel, and served in France until September 1944.

On 24 March 1945 Bing dropped over the Rhine with his new handler Corporal "Jack" Walton, and took part in Operation Varsity, Operation Plunder and the advance into Germany.

After the war he was returned to the Fetch family. On his death in 1955 his skin and fur were mounted for display while the rest of his remains were buried in the PDSA Animal Cemetery in Ilford in Essex.

The book The Amazing Adventures of Bing the Parachuting Dog about his life was published in 2012.

The Dickin Medal is often referred to as the animal equivalent of the Victoria Cross.

== See also ==
- Dogs in warfare
- List of individual dogs
