= Duke of Normandy (pigeon) =

Messenger pigeon in World War II

Duke of Normandy (pigeon number NURP.41.SBC.219) was a pigeon who received the Dickin Medal in 1947 from the People's Dispensary for Sick Animals for bravery in service during the Second World War. Duke of Normandy was the first bird to arrive back with a message from the paratroops of 21st Army Group on D-Day (6 June 1944) after the capture of a gun battery at Merville.

== See also ==
- List of individual birds
