= Bob (dog) =

Dog that served in the Second World War

Bob was a dog, who received the Dickin Medal in 1944 from the People's Dispensary for Sick Animals, for bravery in service, during the Second World War.

The Dickin Medal is often referred to as the animal metaphorical equivalent of the Victoria Cross.

== See also ==
- List of individual dogs
