= Ruhr Express (pigeon) =

Pigeon Used as Spy in American Army

Ruhr Express (pigeon NURP.43.29018) was a pigeon who received the Dickin Medal in May 1945 from the People's Dispensary for Sick Animals for bravery in service during the Second World War.

Bred and trained at RAF Detling, Ruhr Express was selected from amongst the RAF pigeons to accompany US paratroopers in a reconnaissance mission behind enemy lines into the Ruhr Valley in April 1945. The mission collected detailed information on enemy troops and defensive positions before dispatching Ruhr Express to return with the intelligence report.

== See also ==
- List of individual birds
