= Commando (pigeon) =

Pigeon receiver of the Dickin Medal

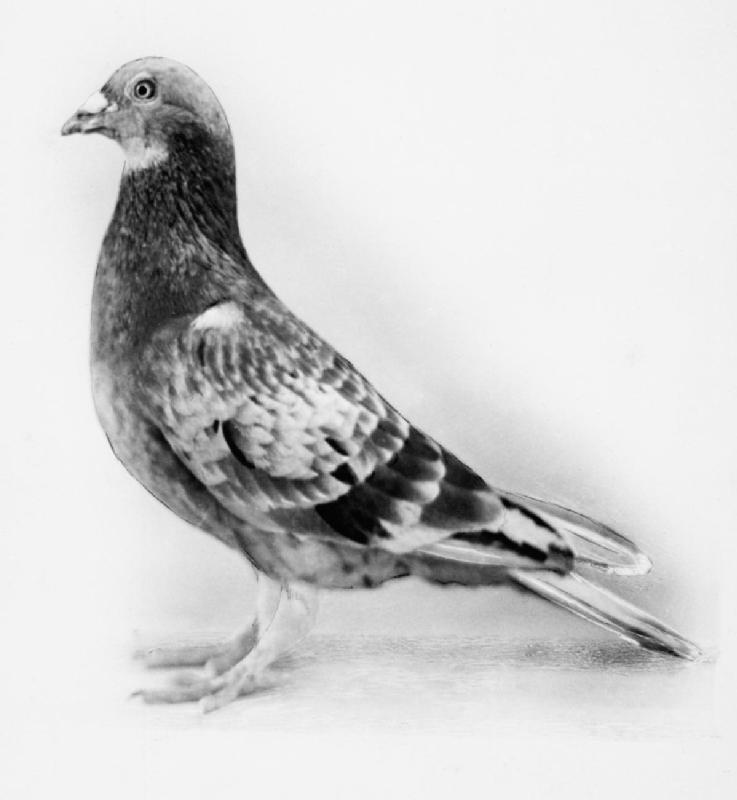
A photograph of Commando from the Imperial War Museum archives.

Commando was a pigeon used in service with the British armed forces during the Second World War to carry crucial intelligence. The pigeon carried out more than ninety missions during the war, and received the Dickin Medal (the animal equivalent of the Victoria Cross) for three particularly notable missions in 1945. The medal was later sold at an auction for £9,200.

== Early life ==
Commando, a red chequer bird, was bred in Haywards Heath, Sussex in the United Kingdom by Sid Moon. Moon was a pigeon fancier who had served with the Army Pigeon Service during the First World War. With the outbreak of the Second World War, Moon offered the service of his pigeons to the war effort in 1939. Commando was one of the pigeons taken into military service.

== Military career ==
Pigeons were used where radio communications had become highly dangerous. A small canister was attached to the pigeon's leg, which contained the information that was being sent. Fewer than one in eight of the pigeons were able to conclude their missions successfully. Most fell victim to the marksmen and falconers that German troops used to intercept these birds along the French coast, while others were killed through bad weather, exhaustion, or by wild birds of prey.

Serving with the National Pigeon Service (NPS) during the Second World War, Commando had been given the identification code N.U.R.P.38.EGU.242. During his career, Commando made more than ninety trips into and out of German occupied France, carrying confidential messages. Messenger pigeons were carried into the war zones by British paratroopers, and released as needed with messages attached to fly home. He was noted for three particular missions carried out in 1942—one in June, another in August, and the third in September—in which he carried crucial intelligence to Britain from agents in France. This vital information included the location of German troops, industrial sites and injured British soldiers.

== Recognition ==
For these three missions that Commando conducted, he received the PDSA Dickin Medal, which is considered to be the animals' medal equivalent to the Victoria Cross, the highest military award for bravery in the UK. He received the award along with Royal Blue, the King's pigeon from the Royal Lofts at Sandringham. They were both presented their awards on 12 April 1945 in London by Rear Admiral R. M. Bellairs. The citation for the award that Commando received is as follows.

For successfully delivering messages from Agents in Occupied France on three occasions: twice under exceptionally adverse conditions, while serving with the NPS in 1942.

The medal was auctioned by Valerie Theobold, Moon's grand daughter, in 2004. It was bought by a British collector for £9,200. It had been valued in a range between £5,000 to £7,000.

== Post-military life ==
After the war, Commando enjoyed a somewhat celebrity-like status. He also participated in an exhibition of wartime homing pigeons.

== See also ==
- List of individual birds
