= Mali (dog) =

Military working dog

Mali, a Belgian Malinois, is a military working dog. In 2017, he was awarded the People's Dispensary for Sick Animals' Dickin Medal for bravery. As of 2018, he was the only surviving recipient of the Dickin medal.

== See also ==
- List of individual dogs
