= Broad Arrow (pigeon) =

Broad Arrow (designated as Pigeon - 41.BA.2793), was a messenger pigeon that was awarded the Dickin Medal in October 1945 for carrying three important messages for the National Pigeon Service. These were carried in May 1943, June 1943 and August 1943.

== See also ==
- List of individual birds
