= Flying Dutchman (pigeon) =

Pigeon

Flying Dutchman was a pigeon who received the Dickin Medal in 1945 from the People's Dispensary for Sick Animals for bravery in service during the Second World War.

== See also ==
- List of individual birds
