= Rex (search and rescue dog) =

Rex was a dog who received the Dickin Medal in April, 1945 from the People's Dispensary for Sick Animals for bravery in service during the Second World War in England. This MAP Civil Defence rescue dog performed "outstanding good work" finding casualties in burning buildings. Rex intrepidly worked in a harsh environment of "smouldering debris, thick smoke, intense heat and jets of water" using a rare combination of determination and intelligence to follow scents to those who were trapped.

The Dickin Medal is often referred to as the animal metaphorical equivalent of the Victoria Cross.

== See also ==
- List of individual dogs
