= Sasha (dog) =

British bomb detection dog

- Species: Canis familiaris
- Breed: Labrador Retriever
- Sex: Female
- Born: c.2004
- Died: 24 July 2008 (aged 3–4); Helmand Province, Afghanistan
- Nationality: British
- Employer: British Army
- Notable role: Bomb detection dog
- Years active: 2004–2008
- Appearance: Yellow coat
- Awards: Dickin Medal

Sasha DM (2004–2008) was a Labrador Retriever who served as a bomb detection dog for the British Army whilst stationed in Afghanistan. Sasha and her handler, Lance Corporal Kenneth Rowe, were killed in July 2008. Sasha was awarded the Dickin Medal, also known as the animals' Victoria Cross, in 2014.

== Military career ==
Sasha was originally assigned as a bomb detection search dog to Marianne Hay, who gave Sasha up as she felt that they could not work in the field together because they had become too close. Sasha was assigned to Lance Corporal Kenneth Rowe in May 2008, while Hay was given the English Springer Spaniel Leanna. Prior to deployment in Afghanistan, Sasha and Rowe were well known to the other members of the 104 Working Dog Unit, based at St George's Barracks, North Luffenham, Rutland. Sasha was particularly friendly with Treo, whose handler described Sasha as "Treo's bit of skirt" and said himself that "if there is one dog in the 104 that can rival Treo's abilities, it's her".

=== Service in Afghanistan ===
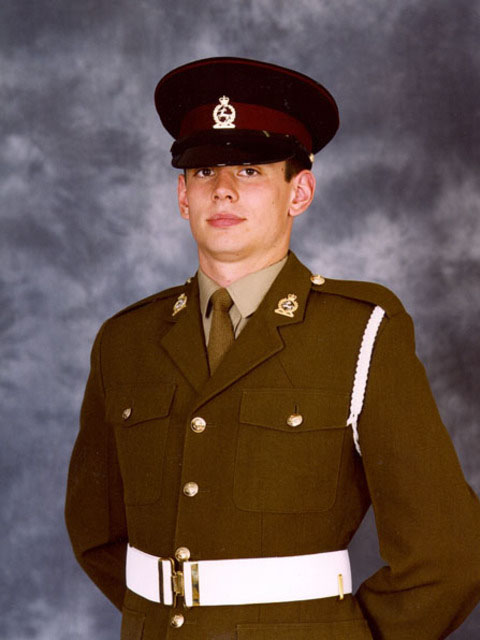
Lance Corporal Kenneth Rowe was Sasha's second handler.

Sasha served with the Royal Army Veterinary Corps, attached to the 2nd Battalion of the Parachute regiment in the Kandahar region, working out of the Inkerman base. The weapons Sasha found included mortars, mines, and other weapons, with one particularly large find in Garmsir. During her time in Afghanistan, she made 15 confirmed finds of either ammunition caches or hidden explosives. Sasha was well liked by the troops in the Parachute regiment, and raised morale whenever she was on patrol. She also liked to chase the feral cats that inhabited the base.

Sasha and her handler were killed during an ambush on their patrol on 24 July 2008. A sniper had shot Sasha, and although injured, the dog returned to her handler. The Taliban forces used this to locate Rowe's position and killed both dog and handler with a volley of five rocket-propelled grenades. They had been scheduled to return to the UK on the day before their deaths, but Rowe had asked to remain behind as there was no incoming dog team to take over, and he was concerned about the safety issues for his regiment.

Heyhoe and other members of the 104 returned to Camp Bastion to escort Rowe and Sasha's remains onto the C-130 Hercules transport plane when they were returned to the UK. An honour guard of the local forces in dress uniforms were also present as Rowe's coffin was carried onto the plane. Sasha's ashes were returned on the same flight in a brass shell case engraved with her name and details. It was carried by Marianne Hay, Sasha's first handler. Their remains arrived at RAF Lyneham on 29 July 2008, where a private repatriation service was held and a subsequent parade through Wootton Bassett. Rowe's family were subsequently awarded the Elizabeth Cross in his honour in 2010.

=== Dickin Medal ===
It was announced in April 2014 that Sasha was to be posthumously awarded the PDSA Dickin Medal. The Director General of the PDSA, Jan McLoughlin said of the award "We are extremely proud to be awarding a posthumous PDSA Dickin Medal to a Military Working Dog Sasha. The award is even more poignant as we approach the centenary of World War One and are reminded of the huge debt we owe the animals who serve in times of conflict. Sasha's exceptional devotion to duty in Afghanistan saved many lives, both soldiers and civilians. This medal, recognised worldwide as the animals' Victoria Cross, honours both Sasha's unwavering service and her ultimate sacrifice."

The Dickin Medal is often referred to as the animal metaphorical equivalent of the Victoria Cross.

== See also ==
- List of individual dogs
