= Maquis (pigeon) =

Pigeon receiver of the Dickin Medal

Maquis (NPSNS.42.36392) was a pigeon that received the Dickin Medal in 1945 from the People's Dispensary for Sick Animals for bravery in service during the Second World War. Maquis was cited for successfully delivering messages from enemy-occupied territory on three occasions. These were in May 1943, February 1944 and June 1944 while serving with the Special Service on the Continent.

== See also ==
- List of individual birds
