= Hertz (dog) =

Dog receiver of the Dickin Medal

Hertz is a dog that received the Dickin Medal of the People's Dispensary for Sick Animals in 2022.

Hertz is a German Shorthaired Pointer and was born in Croatia. Hertz joined the Royal Air Force at the age of one after being noticed for his skills in drug detection. Hertz was trained as the first British military dog ever to be trained in the art of detecting electronic communications equipment.

He served with the Royal Air Force Police during the war in Afghanistan in the 2010s and is now retired. Hertz and his handler, WO Jonathan Tanner, were deployed to Afghanistan and the pair worked daily around Camp Bastion, successfully detecting drugs and electronic devices. Hertz was subsequently deployed to Kabul and the wider Helmand Province.

== See also ==
- List of individual dogs
