= Thorn (dog) =

Thorn was an Alsatian (German Shepherd) dog who received the Dickin Medal (often referred to as "the animals' Victoria Cross") in 1945 from the People's Dispensary for Sick Animals for bravery in service during the Second World War. Thorn's medal was "for locating air-raid casualties in spite of thick smoke in a burning building" during the Blitz.

After the war Thorn went on to a brief acting career, playing a part in the 1948 film Daughter of Darkness.
