= DD.43.T.139 =

Australian war pigeon

DD.43.T.139 was an Australian pigeon who received the Dickin Medal in February 1947 from the People's Dispensary for Sick Animals for bravery in service during World War II. Serving with the Australian Army Signal Corps, DD.43.T.139 was cited for homing 40 miles (64 km) to Madang, Papua New Guinea during a heavy tropical storm after being released from an Australian army boat that was foundering. The message allowed a rescue ship to be sent in time to salvage the craft and its cargo of stores and ammunition.

== See also ==
- List of individual birds
