= Navy Blue (pigeon) =

Navy Blue was a homing pigeon who served in the Royal Air Force during World War II. In March of 1945, it received the Dickin Medal by the People's Dispensary for Sick Animals for delivering an important message from a raiding party on the west coast of France.

== See also ==
- List of individual birds
- Military animal
