= NURP.38.BPC.6 =

Pigeon receiver of the Dickin Medal

NURP.38.BPC.6 was a pigeon who received the Dickin Medal in 1946 from the People's Dispensary for Sick Animals for bravery in service during the Second World War.

== See also ==
- List of individual birds
