= NPS.42.NS.2780 =

Pigeon receiver of the Dickin Medal

NPS.42.NS.2780 was a pigeon who received the Dickin Medal in October 1945 from the People's Dispensary for Sick Animals for bravery in service during the Second World War. NPS.42 was cited after delivering important messages three times from enemy occupied territory, in July 1942, August 1942 and April 1943, while serving with the Special Service in Europe.

== See also ==
- List of individual birds
