= White Vision =

World War II homing pigeon

White Vision, also known by her service number SURP.41.L.3089, was a female Second World War homing pigeon who served with the National Pigeon Service and was posted to No. 190 Squadron RAF. She was awarded the Dickin Medal for gallantry in 1943 for delivering a message from a flying boat forced to ditch off the coast of Scotland.

== Military service ==
White Vision was bred by the Fleming brothers of Motherwell, Lanarkshire, Scotland. During the Second World War she was lent to the National Pigeon Service, and was stationed at Sullom Voe in the Shetland Islands with No. 190 Squadron RAF.

On 11 October 1943, White Vision was aboard a Consolidated PBY Catalina flying boat when it was forced to ditch in the Atlantic near the Hebrides off the coast of Scotland. With the plane's radio out of action, she was released to indicate where the plane had gone down, as bad weather conditions were preventing it from being found by other planes. She flew some 60 miles (97 km) against a strong headwind, arriving back at her pigeon loft. The search was resumed and the plane was subsequently found, with all eleven members of the air crew saved after they had spent some eighteen hours in the sea.

She was awarded the Dickin Medal on 2 December 1943; her medal citation reads "For delivering a message under exceptionally difficult conditions and so contributing to the rescue of an Air Crew while serving with the RAF in October 1943." The medal is referred to as the animal's Victoria Cross, and White Vision was one of the first pigeons to be awarded it.

== See also ==
- List of individual birds
