= DD.43.Q.879 =

War pigeon

DD.43.Q.879 was an Australian pigeon who received the Dickin Medal in 1947 from the People's Dispensary for Sick Animals for bravery in service during the Second World War. During an attack on a US Marine patrol by Japanese forces on Manus Island, Papua New Guinea, three pigeons were released to warn headquarters of an impending enemy counter attack. Two were killed by enemy fire, but DD.43 successfully reached headquarters, allowing bombing attacks to be directed at enemy forces and for the patrol to be extracted.

== See also ==
- List of individual birds
