= Beach Comber =

WWII Canadian war pigeon

Beach Comber (designated as "Pigeon – NPS.41.NS.4230") was a Canadian war pigeon who received the Dickin Medal for bravery in service during the Second World War.

On 19 August 1942, Beach Comber arrived in Britain, despite hazardous conditions, from Dieppe, France carrying a message from the Canadian Army alerting commanders of their landing there, marking the start of the Dieppe Raid. As a result, on 6 March 1944, the People's Dispensary for Sick Animals awarded Beach Comber the Dickin Medal. Beach Comber remains the only Canadian war pigeon ever to be awarded a Dickin Medal, and one of only three Canadian animals ever to be so honoured.

== See also ==
- List of individual birds
