= Dutch Coast =

War piegon and Dickin Metal recipient

Dutch Coast, also known as NURP.41. A.2164, was a pigeon who received the Dickin Medal in 1945 from the People's Dispensary for Sick Animals for bravery in service during the Second World War.

== Military service ==
Dutch Coast was bred and owned by Mr J Flower of Radcliffe-on-Trent, and was a red cock of the Osman strain of racing pigeons. After being donated into military service, the bird was placed on a bomber so as to relay an S.O.S. message if the plane was shot down. It was given the military designation NURP.41. A.2164. In April 1942, the bomber on which it was on board was ditched in the water near the Dutch coast. The bird was the only one on-board and was retrieved by the crew who released it from the dinghy at 6:20am.

It travelled some 288 miles in 7 and a half hours under poor conditions, back to RAF Syerston in Nottinghamshire. For this action, it was awarded the Dickin Medal in 1945, described as the animal's Victoria Cross.

== See also ==
- List of individual birds
