= Rob (dog) =

Collie dog, Dickin medal recipient

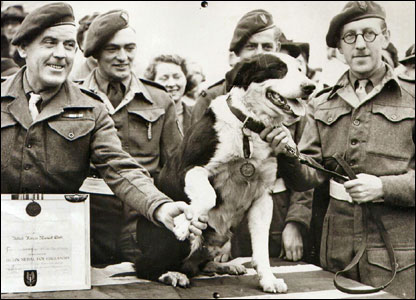
- Rob with his Dickin Medal and SAS troopers, Royal Hospital, Chelsea, September 1945
- Species: Canis familiaris
- Breed: Collie
- Sex: Male
- Born: 1939
- Died: 18 January 1952; Tetchill, Shropshire
- Nationality: British
- Employer: Special Air Service
- Notable role: Military Dog
- Owners: Basil and Heather Bayne
- Awards: Dickin Medal; RSPCA silver medal

Rob (1939 – 18 January 1952) was a Collie dog who in February 1945 was awarded the Dickin Medal, considered to be the animals' Victoria Cross. He was alleged to have made over 20 parachute descents during the North African Campaign, serving with the SAS. Basil Bayne, son of Rob's owners, understands that most of the parachute jumps were demonstration jumps. The last demonstration jump was planned to take place in Wales. Jumps on Active Service are believed to have taken place in Italy. Following the accusation that Rob's service was a hoax, the PDSA was contacted by the Baynes to verify the award of the Dickin medal. Upon consulting their records, the PDSA verified the award.

== Early life and military service ==
Rob was a working dog on a farm in Shropshire until 1942, when his owners, Basil and Heather Bayne, enlisted him as a war dog. Assigned to the Special Air Service at the base in Wivenhoe Park, Essex, Rob's official designation was war dog No 471/322. He was used as a messenger and a guard dog.

== Dickin Medal ==
Rob received his medal in London on 3 February 1945. The citation read "For service including 20 parachute jumps while serving with Infantry in North Africa and SAS Regiment in Italy." Rob won other medals for bravery, including an RSPCA silver medal for Valour. The Dickin Medal is often referred to as the animal metaphorical equivalent of the Victoria Cross.

=== Hoax ===
According to Quentin Hughes' autobiographical account of his time in the 2nd SAS, Who Cares Who Wins?, the actions which led to Rob's Dickin Medal were a hoax. He reported that instead of completing parachute drops as reported, the dog acted as a companion to the regiment quartermaster, Tom Burt. Lll Hughes wrote that when hearing that the family which donated Rob to the Army Veterinary and Remount Services had requested the dog back, he and Burt worked together to keep Rob by exaggerating his exploits. At one point they attempted to carry out a parachute jump with Rob but weather conditions were unfavourable and they could not follow through with the jump as Hughes wrote, "We had a suitable parachute harness and I phoned through to the RAF and made arrangements for Rob to have a short flight, unfortunately, quite a strong wind blew up during the flight and the RAF decided it would be dangerous to drop Rob on that day." They had planned to send a letter to his owners following the successful drop, and after the failure decided to send it anyway. Rob's owners passed the letter about the dog's actions to the PDSA, resulting in Rob's Dickin Medal in January 1945. Although Hughes died in 2004, the possibility of a hoax was not revealed until 2006 when a painting of Rob was featured in an exhibition entitled "The Animals' War" at the Imperial War Museum in London. According to Hughes' friend Mickey King, who remembered the author discussing the incident, "Quentin said that nobody survived 20 parachute drops, let alone a dog. You were lucky to survive three."

=== Sold at Auction ===
Rob's Dickin Medal (along with associated photographs, supporting materials including a draft manuscript of an unpublished book by Mrs Bayne) was sold by auction at Noonans Mayfair in London for a record price of £140,000 (plus 24% buyer's premium) on 12 October 2022.

== Later life ==
Following his military service, he returned to his owners in Tetchill, near Ellesmere, Shropshire. He died in 1952 and was buried on the family farm, marked with a stone memorial which reads:

To the dear memory of Rob, war dog no 471/322, twice VC, Britain's first parachute dog, who served three and a half years in North Africa and Italy with the Second Special Air Service Regiment. Died 18th January 1952 aged 12 1/2 years. Erected by Basil and Heather Bayne in memory of a faithful friend and playmate 1939–1952.

== In literature ==
A children's book has been written about Rob, entitled Rob the Paradog, written by Dorothy Nicholle and published by Blue Hills Press.

== See also ==
- List of individual dogs
