= Sam (army dog) =

Army dog

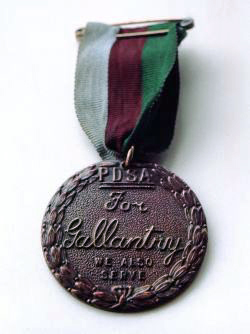
An examplar of the Dickin Medal (received by Sam in 2003)

Sam (died 2000) was an army dog who served with the Royal Army Veterinary Corps Dog Unit. While serving in Bosnia and Herzegovina in the 1990s, Sam helped to apprehend an armed man and also to hold back an armed mob besieging a compound where Serbs were taking refuge. He received the Dickin Medal, the animals' equivalent of the Victoria Cross, in 2003 for these acts of bravery.

== Life and career ==
Sam was a German Shepherd that served with the Dog Unit of the Royal Army Veterinary Corps. Sam and his handler, Sergeant Iain Carnegie, were part of the Peacekeeping force in Bosnia and Herzegovina.

While patrolling in the town of Drvar in 1998 with the First Battalion of The Royal Canadian Regiment, their patrol came under fire from a gunman. After firing, the gunman ran into a bar, whereupon Sam chased him and brought him down. Sergeant Carnegie then disarmed the man and retrieved a loaded pistol.

Six days after this incident, a mob of rioters armed with crowbars, clubs and stones surrounded a compound where about 50 Serbs were taking refuge. Sam's team managed to force their way into the compound and he held off the rioters until reinforcements arrived.

Sam retired from service two years later, at the age of 10. He died from natural causes soon afterwards.

== Recognition ==
Sam posthumously received the Dickin Medal, the animals' equivalent of the Victoria Cross, in 2003 in recognition of his work in Bosnia and Herzegovina. He was the fifty-ninth animal to receive the award. The citation for the award, which was given on 14 January 2003, read as follows:

For outstanding gallantry in April 1998 while assigned to the Royal Canadian Regiment in Drvar during the conflict in Bosnia-Herzegovina. On two documented occasions Sam displayed great courage and devotion to duty. On 18 April Sam successfully brought down an armed man threatening the lives of civilians and Service personnel. On 24 April, while guarding a compound harbouring Serbian refugees, Sam’s determined approach held off rioters until reinforcements arrived. This dog’s true valour saved the lives of many servicemen and civilians during this time of human conflict.

His handler, Sergeant Carnegie, mentioned after receiving the posthumous award on behalf of Sam that he could never have attempted to carry out his duties without Sam. He also mentioned that Sam never backed off when facing the rioting mob.

== See also ==
- List of individual dogs
