= Punch and Judy (dogs) =

Pair of dogs that received the Dickin Medal for service in Mandatory Palestine in 1946

Punch and Judy were a pair of dogs that received the Dickin Medal from the People's Dispensary for Sick Animals for their bravery in service in Palestine in 1946. The commendation notes: "saved the lives of two British Officers... [by warning them of and] attacking an armed terrorist who was stealing upon them unawares." Both dogs were severely wounded.

The Dickin Medal is often referred to as the animal metaphorical equivalent of the Victoria Cross.

== See also ==
- List of individual dogs
