= Collie =

Type of herding dog

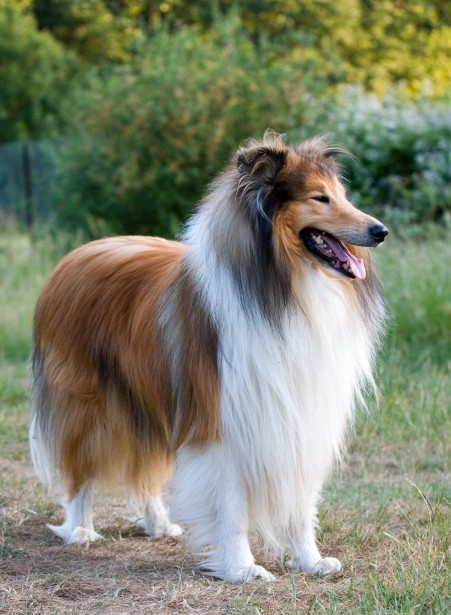
- Rough Collie

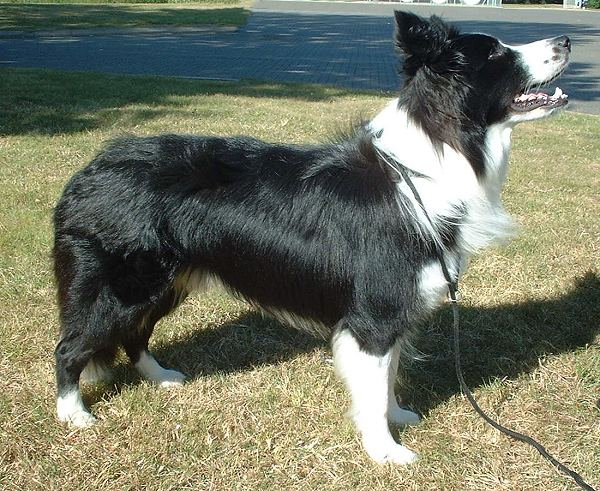
- Border Collie
- Origin: Scotland, Northern England
Traits
- Weight: 22 to 32 kg (48 to 70 lb)

Collies form a distinctive type of herding dogs, including many related landraces and standardized breeds. The type originated in Scotland and Northern England. Collies are medium-sized, fairly lightly-built dogs, with pointed snouts. Many types have a distinctive white color over the shoulders, including a mane. Collies are very active and agile, and most types of collies have a very strong herding instinct. Collie breeds have spread through many parts of the world (especially North America and Australia), and have diversified into many varieties, sometimes mixed with other dog types.

Some collie breeds have remained as working dogs for herding cattle, sheep, and other livestock, while others are kept as pets, show dogs, or for dog sports, in which they display great agility, stamina, and trainability. While the American Kennel Club has a breed they call "collie", in fact collie dogs are a distinctive type of herding dog inclusive of many related landraces and formal breeds. There are usually major distinctions between show dogs and those bred for herding trials or dog sports: The latter typically display great agility, stamina, and trainability, and most importantly intelligence.

Common use of the unmodified name "collie" in some areas is limited largely to certain breeds – the name means Rough Collie by default in parts of the United States, and Border Collie by default in many rural parts of Great Britain. Many collie dog types do not actually include "collie" in their name – for example the Welsh Sheepdog.

== Name ==
The exact origin of the name collie is uncertain; it may derive from the Scots word for 'coal'. Alternatively it may come from the related word coolly, referring to the black-faced mountain sheep of Scotland. The collie name usually refers to dogs of Scottish origin which have spread into many other parts of the world, often being called sheepdog or shepherd dog elsewhere. Iris Combe, in her book, "Border Collies," says that in old Gaelic "collie" was the rural term for anything useful — a "collie dog" was a useful dog.

== Description ==
=== Appearance ===
Collies are generally medium-sized dogs of about 22 to 32 kg (48 to 70 lb) and light to medium-boned. Cattle-herding types are stockier than sheep-herding types. The fur may be short, or long, and the tail may be smooth, feathered, or bushy. In the 1800s, the occasional naturally bob-tailed dog would occur. The tail can be carried low with an upward swirl, or may be carried higher but never over the back. Each breed can vary in coloration, with the usual base colors being black, black-and-tan, red, red-and-tan, white with a colored head with it without other body coloration of sable, black and tan, blue merle, sable merle sable. They often have white along with the main color, usually under the belly and chest, over the shoulders, and on parts of the face and legs, but sometimes leaving only the head colored – or white may be absent (unusual) or limited to the chest and toes (as in the Australian Kelpie). Merle coloration may also be present over any of the other color combinations, even in landrace types. The most widespread patterns include sable, black and white, black and tan and tricolour (black-and-tan and white).

=== Temperament ===
Collies range in trainability from the "average" to very biddable. The Border Collie is the breed most in need of a "job" to stimulate its brain, lest it become anxious and hyper, while many other collie breeds fit well into an active family lifestyle (though all collie types still require some mental stimulation). Collie-type breeds are also known for their sensitivity and awareness of emotions in people; they may require gentler handling than other types of dogs.

=== Working type temperaments ===
A working member of a collie breed, such as the Border Collie, is an energetic and agile dog with great stamina. When in fit, working condition they are able to run all day without tiring, even over very rough or steep ground. Working collies display a keen intelligence for the job at hand and are instinctively highly motivated. They are often intensely loyal. Dogs of collie type or derivation occupy four of the first sixteen ranks in Stanley Coren's The Intelligence of Dogs, with the Border Collie being first. These characteristics generally make working strains suitable for agility; in addition to herding work they are well suited to active sports such as sheepdog trials, flyball, disc dog and dog agility. Working strains have strong herding instincts, and some individuals can be single-minded to the point of obsessiveness. Collies can compete in herding events. Border Collies are used as search dogs in mountain rescue in Britain. They are particularly useful for searching large areas of hillside and avalanche debris. H. MacInnes believed that dark coated dogs are less prone to snow blindness.

=== Show and pet type temperaments ===
Certain types of collie (for example Rough Collies, Smooth Collies, Shetland Sheepdogs and some strains of Border Collie and other breeds) have been bred for many generations as pets and for the sport of conformation showing, not as herding dogs. All collie dog breeds are recognized as highly trainable, gentle, loyal, intelligent, and well suited as pets. Their gentleness and devotion also make them quite compatible with children. They are often more suitable as watchdogs than as guard dogs, though the individual personalities of these dogs vary.

The temperament of these breeds has been featured in literature, film, and popular television programs. The novels of Albert Payson Terhune, which were very popular in the United States during the 1920s and 1930s, celebrated the temperament and companionship of his early AKC collies. More famously, the temperament and intelligence of the Rough Collie were exaggerated to mythic proportions in the character Lassie, which has been the subject of many films, books, and television shows from 1938 to the present.

The Lassie character was featured in a book titled Lassie Come Home by Eric P. Knight. Knight's collie "Tootsie" was the inspiration for the book, which was a collection of stories based on her and other collie legends he collected from talking to friends and neighbors. One such story was most likely the documented tale of "Silverton Bobbie", the Oregon collie who crossed the US to get to his owners. While the dogs who played Lassie on-screen were from AKC lines, the actual Tootsie looked nothing like them, although she did come from a collie breeder.

== Health ==
Some collie breeds (especially the Rough Collie, Smooth Collie, and the Australian Shepherd) are affected by a genetic defect, a mutation within the MDR1 gene, formerly known as "ivermectin sensitivity", but now known to cause lowered tolerance to a wide variety of different veterinary drugs. Approximately 70% of collies are affected, making them very sensitive to some drugs, such as Ivermectin, as well as to some antibiotics, opioids including loperamide, and steroids – over 100 drugs in total. The MDR1 status of individual dogs can be easily tested for. In addition, the intestinal functional system of this breed is also very fragile, and compared with similar medium and large dogs, they are easy to receive food stimulation, which leads to vomiting and excretion abnormalities or gastrointestinal diseases. Therefore, breeders need to ensure strict hygiene for dogs to eat fresh ingredients, and rich nutrition. The Verband für das Deutsche Hundewesen (The German Kennel Club) encourages breed clubs to test all breeding stock and avoid breeding from affected dogs.

Collies may have a genetic disease, named canine cyclic neutropenia, or grey collie syndrome. This is a stem cell disorder. Puppies with this disorder are quite often mistaken for healthy Blue Merles, even though their colour is a silver grey. Affected puppies rarely live more than 6 months. For a puppy to be affected, both the sire and the dam have to be carriers of the disorder.

Canine familial dermatomyositis is an inherited idiopathic condition affecting the skin and muscle and in rare cases the blood vessels. The condition causes dermatitis throughout the body and proceeds to myositis which in severe cases leads to megaesophagus. Collies alongside the Beauceron and Shetland Sheepdog are known to have a predilection to the condition although it has been described in other breeds.

Collie eye anomaly is an autosomal recessive condition caused by a mutation in the NHEJ1 gene that affects Collies and related breeds.

== Collie types and breeds ==
Herding dogs of collie type have long been widespread in Britain, and these can be regarded as a landrace from which a number of other landraces, types, and formal breeds have been derived, both in Britain and elsewhere. Many of them are working herding dogs, but some have been bred for conformation showing and as pets, sometimes losing their working instincts in the course of selection for appearance or for a more subdued temperament.

Herding types tend to vary in appearance more than conformation and pet types, as they are bred primarily for their working ability, and appearance is thus of lower importance.

Dogs of collie type or ancestry include:

Australian Kelpie
Developed in Australia from collies originally brought from Scotland and northern England. Erect ears, short-haired, usually black, black-and-tan or red-and-tan, with white limited to chest and toes.
Australian Shepherd
Derives its name from the sheep imported from Australia in the 19th century, but native to the Western United States. Used as both a drover and guardian of sheep and cattle. Ancestry almost certainly includes British collie types and Basque and Spanish sheepdogs. Shaggy mid length coat in every colour including merle, half prick ears, bobbed tail, and (very important) eyes of different colour, heterochromia very common.

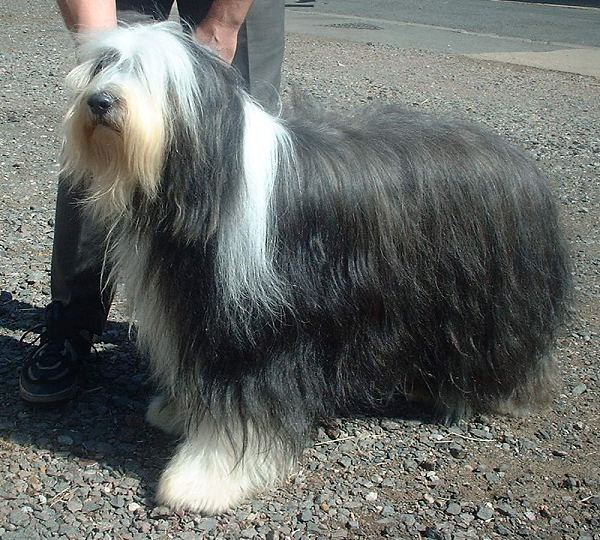
Bearded Collie

Bearded Collie
Now largely a pet and show breed, but still of the collie type, and some are used as working dogs. The Beardie has a flat, harsh, strong and shaggy outer coat and a soft, furry undercoat. The coat falls naturally to either side without need of a part. Long hair on the cheeks, lower lips, and under the chin forms the beard for which it is known.
All Bearded Collies are born black, blue, brown, or fawn, with or without white markings. Some carry a fading gene, and as they mature, the coat lightens, darkening again slightly after one year of age. A puppy born black may become any shade of gray from black to slate to silver. The dogs that are born brown will lighten from chocolate to sandy, and the blues and fawns show shades from dark to light. Dogs without the fading gene stay the color they were when they were born. The white only occurs as a blaze on the face, on the head, on the tip of the tail, on the chest, legs, feet, and around the neck. Tan markings occasionally appear on the eyebrows, inside the ears, on the cheeks, under the root of the tail and on the legs where the white joins the main color.
Blue Lacy
Grey or red all over, short hair, floppy ears. Derived partly from the English Shepherd, with other non-collie breeds.

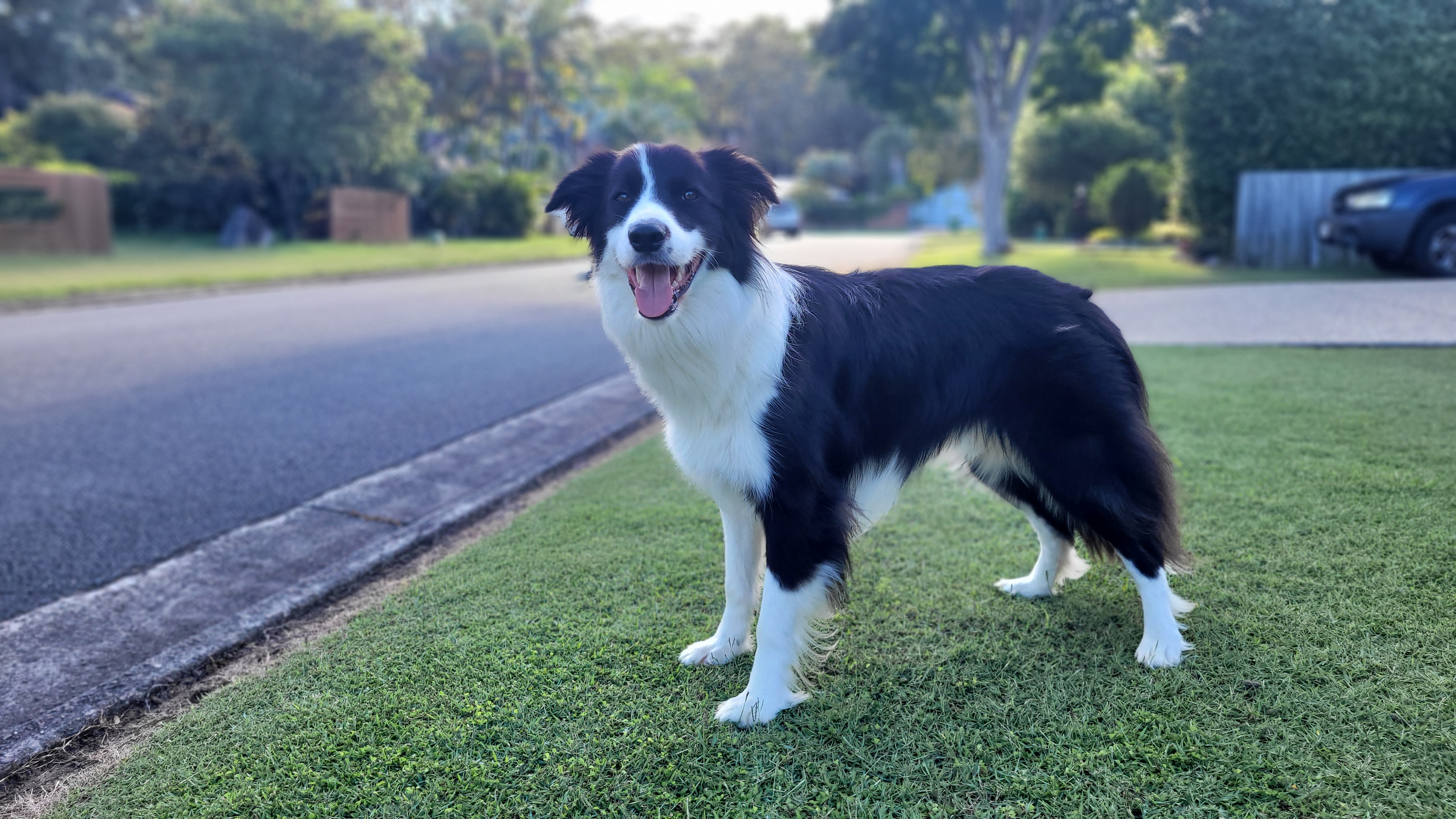
Border Collie

Border Collie
The most well known breed for herding sheep throughout the world. Originally developed in Scotland and Northern England. Not always suitable for herding cattle. Ears semi-erect or floppy, fur silky or fairly long, but short on face and legs; red, black, black-and-tan or merle, all usually with white over shoulders, alternatively mostly white with coloured patches on head. Coat can be either long or short.
Cumberland Sheepdog
An extinct breed similar to the Border Collie and possibly absorbed into that breed. An ancestor of the Australian Shepherd. Erect or semi-erect ears, dense fur, black with white only on face and chest.
English Shepherd
Developed in the U.S. from stock of Farm Collie type originally from Britain. Floppy ears, thick fur, red, black or black-and-tan, with white over shoulders. Not to be confused with the very different Old English Sheepdog.
German Coolie
Also called Koolie, or German Collie. Developed in Australia, probably from British collies, but may have included dogs from Germany and Spain. Erect ears, short fur, black, red, black-and-tan or merle, often with some white on neck or over shoulders. (Note: the name "German Collie" is also applied to a cross between a German Shepherd and a Border Collie.)
Huntaway
Developed in New Zealand from a mixture of breeds, probably including some collie, but it is not of the collie type. Larger and more heavily built than most collies, floppy ears, most commonly black-and-tan with little white.
Lurcher
Not an established breed, but a cross of collie (or other herding dog or terrier) with Greyhound or other sight hound. Traditionally bred for poaching, with the speed of a sight hound but more obedient and less conspicuous. Variable in appearance, but with greyhound build: Floppy ears, tall, slender, with small head, deep chest and "herring gut"; smooth, silky or rough coat, often brindled.
McNab Shepherd
Developed in the U.S. from Scotch Collies and dogs imported by Basque sheepherders. Variable in size, erect or semi-erect ears, short to medium fur, black or red with some white on face, chest and/or feet.
Miniature American Shepherd
Developed in the United States as a miniature version of the Australian Shepherd.
New Zealand Heading Dog
Also called New Zealand Eye Dog. Developed in New Zealand from Border Collie heritage and used to bring sheep towards the shepherd, especially with strong eye contact and no barking.
Old English Sheepdog
Derived from "Shags", hairy herding dogs, themselves derived from "Beards", the ancestors of the Bearded Collie. Modern dogs larger than most collies, no tail, floppy ears, long silky hair (including on face), usually grey and white. Not to be confused with the English Shepherd.
Scotch Collie
Scotch collies are separated into two varieties or breeds: Rough Collie and Smooth Collie. They are rather a different type to other collies with a long narrow face, tall, profuse coat and semi-erect ears. They are still used for herding as well as for showing. They were developed in the highlands of Scotland which is why they needed a profuse coat. There are four recognised colors: Sable, tri-color, blue merle, and color headed white. Non-recognized colors are: Bi-black, sable merle, harlequin, red merle, red tricolor, and black and tan. Both the Rough and Smooth Collies are double-coated with Smooths having a shorter or "smooth" outer coat. There are three different coat types of Rough Collies: Brandwyn (fluffy coats), Parader (flat long coats) and the working type (medium-length coats).
Shetland Sheepdog
A small show and pet breed developed in England partly from herding dogs originating in Shetland. The original Shetland dogs were not collies, but instead working herding dogs of Spitz type, similar to the Icelandic Sheepdog. However, in the development of the modern Shetland breed these Spitz-type dogs were heavily mixed with the Rough Collie and toy breeds, and now are similar in appearance to a miniature Rough Collie. Very small, nearly erect ears, long silky fur on body, most commonly sable or merle, with white over shoulders.

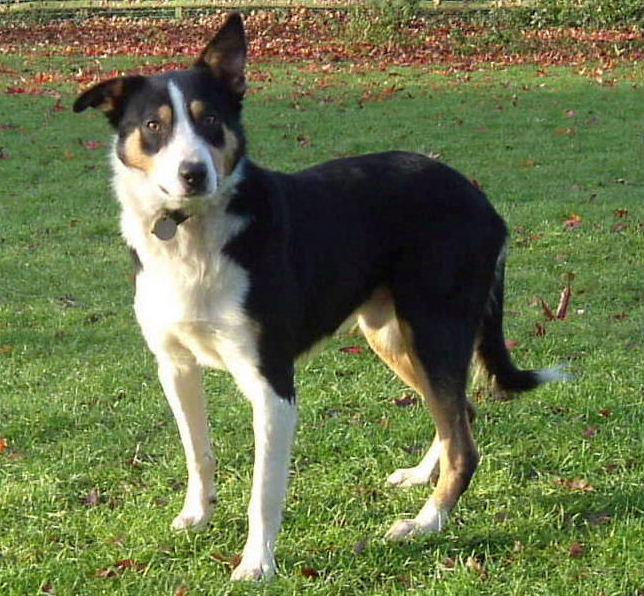
Welsh Sheepdog

Smithfield
Originally a British type, now extinct, used for droving cattle in the south-east of England, especially the Smithfield Market in London. They were large, strong collies, with white or black-and-white fur, and floppy-ears. Occasionally the name is used for modern dogs of a somewhat similar type in Australia. The name "Smithfield" is used to describe the shaggy Tasmanian farm dog of Bearded Collie type; and is also applied to the Australian Stumpy Tail Cattle Dog and may have contributed to the Australian Koolie.
Welsh Sheepdog
Landrace herding dog from Wales. Erect or semi-erect ears, short or silky fur, red, black, black-and-tan, or merle, all usually with white over shoulders.

== Famous collies ==
- Blanco, pet of Lyndon Johnson.
- Kep, pet of Beatrix Potter. He is depicted in the book The Tale of Jemima Puddle-Duck.
- Lad, pet of Albert Payson Terhune. He is chronicled through several short stories, most famously in the collection Lad, A Dog.
- Pickles, known for his role in finding the stolen Jules Rimet Trophy in March 1966, four months before the 1966 FIFA World Cup kicked off in England.
- Pal, who played Lassie (see below).
- Peter, awarded the Dickin Medal for conspicuous gallantry or devotion to duty while serving in military conflict.
- Reveille, a Rough Collie, official mascot of Texas A&M University.
- Rob, awarded the Dickin Medal for conspicuous gallantry or devotion to duty while serving in military conflict.
- Seamus, pet of Humble Pie front-man, Steve Marriott. Seamus' howling was recorded by Pink Floyd and the resulting song, "Seamus" was released on their album, Meddle (1971).
- Sheila, awarded the Dickin Medal for conspicuous gallantry or devotion to duty while serving in military conflict.
- Shep, Blue Peter dog.
- Silverton Bobbie, the Wonder Dog who in 1923, traveled 2,800 miles from Indiana back home to Silverton, Oregon.
- Two famous white Collies owned by United States President and Mrs. Calvin Coolidge. A large oil painting hangs in The White House of First Lady Mrs. Coolidge and one of their white Collies.

== Collies in fiction ==
- Lassie was a fictional Rough Collie dog character created by Eric Knight who originally was featured in a short story expanded to novel length called Lassie Come-Home. The character then went on to star in numerous MGM movies, a long running classic TV series, and various remakes/spinoffs/revivals.
- Bessy, a long-running Belgian comics series which also was very successful in French, German and Swedish translations. It also featured a collie, obviously based on Lassie, but in a Wild West setting.
- Fly and Rex, Border Collie herding dogs of the movie, Babe.
- The Dog, the Border Collie of the comic strip Footrot Flats.
- Colleen, a female rough collie in Road Rovers.
- Nana, a female Border Collie in Snow Dogs.
- Shadow, collie from Enid Blyton's book Shadow the Sheepdog. The collie type is not identified in the text, but the illustrations in an early edition look vaguely like a Border Collie.
- Fly, the sheep dog featured in Arthur Waterhouse's "Fells" trilogy for children, Raiders of the Fells (1948), Rogues of the Fells (1951) and Fly of the Fells (1957). The collie type is not specified, but the illustrations look rather like a Rough Collie.
- The eponymous dog from the film Bingo.
- Flo, a female Rough Collie in All Dogs Go to Heaven.
- Dan, a Border Collie in Dog Squad.
- Shep, a female Border Collie from Hotel for Dogs.
- Ralphie, a Bearded Collie from Hotel for Dogs.
- Murray, the male collie from the TV series Mad About You.
- Ko, a Rough Collie in the Ōkami video game.
- A collie in White Fang by Jack London is the mate of the wolfdog White Fang.
- Courageous Collie Carlo, a Rough Collie from Martha Speaks.
- Collie, a Rough Collie in One Hundred and One Dalmatians.
- Mr. Pickles, a Border Collie in the Adult Swim series Mr. Pickles.
- Khyi Yang Po, a Bearded Collie in The Shaggy Dog.
- Scouty, a blue Border Collie in Strawberry Shortcake's Berry Bitty Adventures.
- Shep, a male Rough Collie in Horseland.
- Winona, a Border Collie from My Little Pony: Friendship is Magic.
- Mackenzie, a Border Collie in Bluey.
- Surfer, a Rough Collie in Bluey.
- Roger, a Border Collie in Cats & Dogs 3: Paws Unite!.
- Messi, a Border Collie, played service dog Snoop in Justine Triet's 2023 film Anatomy of a Fall.

== See also ==
- List of dog breeds
