= Max (British dog) =

Order of Merit award-winning dog

- Species: Canis familiaris
- Breed: English Springer Spaniel
- Sex: Male
- Born: 12 August 2007
- Died: 6 April 2022 (aged 14); Manesty Woods, Cumbria
- Nationality: England
- Occupation: Therapy dog
- Owner: Kerry Irving
- Awards: PDSA Order of Merit

Max (12 August 2007 – 6 April 2022) was an English Springer Spaniel pet dog who in February 2021 became the first ever pet to receive the PDSA Order of Merit, an award which is considered the animal equivalent of the Order of the British Empire and is normally reserved for dogs such as police dogs or service dogs. He died on 6 April 2022.

== Background ==
Kerry Irving of Cumbria in the United Kingdom was seriously injured in a road traffic accident and while recuperating and suffering from depression, he adopted Max to bring for walks to assist him in his wellbeing. Kerry credits Max as giving him the will to live again.

== Social media ==
Max became a social media celebrity when his owner created the page Max Out in the Lake District, which attracted a large following and was said to have helped "thousands across the globe" during the COVID-19 pandemic and was subsequently christened Max the miracle dog. The daily walks around the Lake District were streamed live via Facebook; in the process of these walks, from 2017 to 2022, Max and his owner raised over £450,000 for charity and have attended numerous public events, charity walks and school visits.

== PDSA award ==
On 19 February 2021, the People's Dispensary for Sick Animals (PDSA) awarded Max the Order of Merit, with the citation:

"For providing support in recovery and enriching the lives of many others.” This recognised how the dogs had helped their owner and their valuable community activity."

The director general of the PDSA stated: "Max has provided a source of huge comfort - not only to his owner Kerry, but to thousands of people across the globe who are facing or have gone through hard times. He has become a true ambassador for the positive impact that animals have on mental health and wellbeing, which is more important now than ever."

== See also ==
- List of individual dogs
