= Royal Blue (pigeon) =

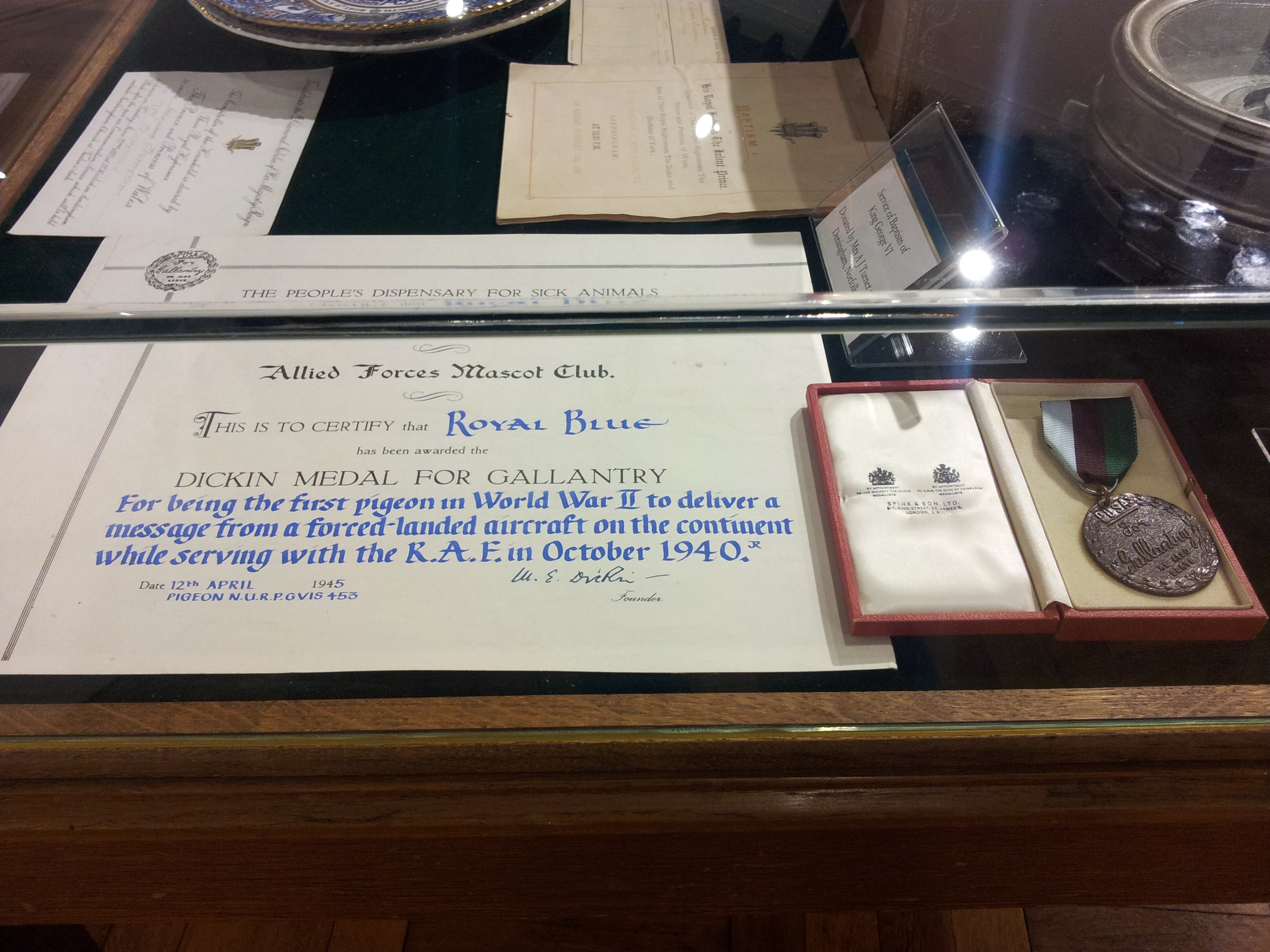
Royal Blue's medal

Royal Blue, also known as NURP.40.GVIS.453, was a male pigeon of the RAF pigeon service. He was awarded the Dickin Medal for bravery in March 1945 for being the first pigeon to deliver a message from an allied forced landed aircraft from the European mainland during World War II. He had originally been housed at the Royal Lofts at Sandringham, and was owned by King George VI.

== Military service ==
Royal Blue, a blue cock, was owned by George VI of the United Kingdom through the Royal Lofts at Sandringham. He was also known by the identifier NURP.40.GVIS.453.

Royal Blue was one of a number of pigeons kept aboard RAF bombers and reconnaissance planes so that a downed plane's co–ordinates could be sent back to the base in Britain so that a search and rescue mission could be mounted. Royal Blue was the first such pigeon to return to its base on the 10 October 1940, having been released in the Netherlands. In around four hours and ten minutes, he flew 120 miles (190 km).

Royal Blue was awarded the Dickin Medal, considered to be the animal equivalent of the Victoria Cross, in March 1945, after being initially reviewed by the Allied Forces Mascot Club. The citation read "For being the first pigeon in this war to deliver a message from a forced landed aircraft on the Continent while serving with the RAF in October, 1940". Along with fellow pigeon Commando, the duo were presented with their medals by Rear Admiral R.M. Bellairs on 12 April 1945. He is one of 32 pigeons to have been awarded a Dickin Medal.

== See also ==
- List of individual birds
