= Sheila (dog) =

- Species: Dog
- Breed: Border Collie
- Sex: Female
- Nationality: United Kingdom
- Notable role: Sheep dog
- Owner: John Dagg
- Offspring: Tibbie
- Awards: Dickin Medal

Sheila was a dog who received the Dickin Medal in 1945 from the People's Dispensary for Sick Animals for bravery in service during the Second World War. She is the first non-military dog to have received the medal, which was later sold at auction alongside the medals of her owner, John Dagg, for £]25,300 by Sotheby's.

== Dickin medal ==
External image
- John Dagg and Shiela

On 16 December 1944, a Boeing B-17 Flying Fortress from the U.S. Eighth Air Force carrying a full payload of bombs, crashed into the Cheviot Hills on the border between England and Scotland. Two local shepherds, John Dagg and Frank Moscrop headed up the mountainside with Dagg's sheepdog Sheila to investigate and see if there was anything they could do to help. The ongoing blizzard reduced the visibility on the mountainside to the bare minimum and the duo had to rely on Sheila to track down the aircraft. She tracked four of the airmen who were in a nearby crevice to escape the weather, and took the two shepherds to their location. Together they led the airmen back down to their cottage, arriving as the bombs on the B-17 detonated. Because of their actions, Lt George Kyle, Sgt Howard Delaney, Sgt George Smith and Sgt Joel Berly survived the crash.

For the rescue of the airmen, Sheila was awarded the Dickin Medal by the People's Dispensary for Sick Animals. It is often referred to as the animal equivalent of the Victoria Cross. It was the first time that the medal had been awarded to a non-military dog, this time a search and rescue dog. Meanwhile, Dagg was given the British Empire Medal. One of Sheila's puppies, Tibbie, was later sent to the family of Sgt Frank Turner who did not survive the crash on the mountain.

A film called To The Border Bred was later produced which told the story of Sheila and followed Tibbie as she travelled to South Carolina.

The two medals, along with Dagg's British Empire Medal and First World War medals and newspaper clippings about the crash, were sold by Sotheby's auction house on 13 December 2005 for £25,300 (ca. $40,488.00 American dollars).

== See also ==
- List of individual dogs
