= William of Orange (pigeon) =

WWII carrier pigeon

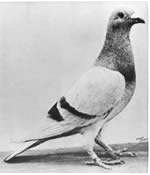
Pigeon William of Orange

William of Orange was a male war pigeon of British military intelligence service MI14. He was awarded the 21st Dickin Medal for delivering a message from the Arnhem Airborne Operation. This message saved more than 2000 soldiers at the time of the Battle of Arnhem in September 1944. His official name in military record is NPS.42.NS.15125. He received the Dickin Medal in May 1945.

Communications in that battle were a problem for the Allied units; German troops had surrounded the airborne forces and the few radio sets present malfunctioned. William of Orange was released by British soldiers at 10:30 on 19 September 1944 and arrived at his nest box in England at 14:55. He flew over 400 km (250 mi) and the message he carried was one of few to make their way back to the United Kingdom.

William of Orange was bred by Sir William Proctor Smith of Cheshire and trained by the Army Pigeon Service of the Royal Signals. Smith bought him out of service for £185 and ten years later reported that William was "the grandfather of many outstanding racing pigeons".

== See also ==
- List of individual birds
