= Rifleman Khan =

British WWII military dog

- Species: Canis familiaris
- Breed: Alsatian
- Nationality: United Kingdom
- Owner: Railton family
- Awards: Dickin Medal

Rifleman Khan was a German Shepherd Dog who was lent to the War Office to become a military dog during World War II, and was a Dickin Medal recipient. He was assigned to the Cameronians (Scottish Rifles) and took part in the Battle of the Scheldt.

== Military career ==
Khan, a German Shepherd Dog, was lent to the War Office by the Railton family from Tolworth, Surrey in the summer of 1942. He had simply been their family pet. Considered a "star pupil" by officers at the War Dog Training School, he went on to be assigned to the sixth battalion of the Cameronians (Scottish Rifles). Lance Corporal James Muldoon became his handler.

In November 1944 the battalion was part of the Allied force sent to attack the island of Walcheren in the Netherlands, as part of the Battle of the Scheldt. The island was of strategic importance and needed to be taken in order for the invasion of Germany to take place. Khan and Muldoon were in an assault craft approaching the island by sea when a spotlight came upon them and the boat came under heavy fire. The boat capsized, sending the soldiers into the water. Khan swam to shore and began to look for Muldoon, who could not swim. While still under heavy shelling, Khan swam the 200 yards (180 m) back to Muldoon and pulled him from the water onto the shore. He continued to pull his handler past the muddy shoreline and up onto solid ground, before collapsing next to him.

Khan was awarded the Dickin Medal for bravery on 27 March 1945. His citation read "For rescuing L/Cpl. Muldoon from drowning under heavy shell fire at the assault of Walcheren, November 1944, while serving with the 6th Cameronians (SR)." Following the war, Khan and Muldoon were reunited at a war dogs parade at Wembley Stadium and Khan was given into Muldoon's permanent care.

Rifleman Khan and Lance Corporal Jimmy Muldoon spent their remaining years together in Strathaven.

In 2021 a bronze statue of Khan by John McKenna was unveiled in Strathaven.

== See also ==
- List of individual dogs
