= Theo (dog) =

British Army detection dog (2009–2011)

- Breed: English Springer Spaniel
- Sex: Male
- Born: May 2009
- Died: 1 March 2011 (aged 1 year, 10 months); Camp Bastion, Afghanistan
- Employer: British Army
- Notable role: Bomb detection dog
- Years active: 2010–2011
- Appearance: White with brown markings
- Awards: Dickin Medal

Theo (2009–2011) was an English Springer Spaniel who served as a bomb detection dog for the British Army in Afghanistan. His handler, Lance Corporal Liam Tasker from Kirkcaldy, was killed by a Taliban sniper on 1 March 2011; Theo died after suffering a seizure just hours later, at the age of 1 year and 10 months. The pair set a new record for bomb finds during their time on deployment, and Theo was posthumously awarded the Dickin Medal (also known as the animals' Victoria Cross) in 2012.

== Biography ==
Liam Tasker had transferred to the Royal Army Veterinary Corps in 2007, having originally enlisted in the Royal Electrical and Mechanical Engineers in 2001, and was assigned to the 1st Military Working Dog Regiment. Theo was assigned to Tasker two weeks prior to deployment, after the first two dogs assigned to him did not work out.

Theo was posted to Afghanistan for his first tour of duty in September 2010. Tasker and Theo came under fire from Taliban insurgents whilst on patrol with the 1st Irish Guards in the Nahri Saraj District on 1 March 2011. Tasker was killed by a sniper, and Theo was taken back to Camp Bastion by fellow soldiers. He suffered a seizure after reaching the base and died just hours after Tasker, with the seizure thought to be triggered by the stress of Tasker's death. Autopsy results were inconclusive. Theo was the sixth British Army dog to die in Afghanistan during the conflict. Tasker's mother Jane Duffy later said, "I think Theo died of a broken heart [and] nobody will convince me any different."

At the time of their deaths, the pair were the most successful individual working dog team in Afghanistan, having made more bomb finds than any other during the course of the five months they were stationed there for a total of 14 finds. They had proved so successful that Theo's stay in the country had been extended by a month. Major Alexander Turner said of the pair, "[Tasker] used to joke that Theo was impossible to restrain but I would say the same about Lance Corporal Tasker." The remains of Tasker and Theo were both repatriated to the UK, arriving first at RAF Lyneham. Tasker's mother confirmed that the family requested Theo's ashes be repatriated so the pair could be buried together, stating, "Theo's actually at his feet with him [...] Liam and Theo are where they should be."

On 25 October 2012, Theo was posthumously awarded the Dickin Medal (regarded as the animal equivalent of the Victoria Cross) in a ceremony which coincided with the launch of that year's poppy appeal. The medal was awarded at Wellington Barracks and accepted on Theo's behalf by Sergeant Matthew Jones, who had served with Tasker previously, and his own detection dog Grace.

The video game Diablo 3 later added a pair of legendary gloves called Tasker & Theo, which enhance the effectiveness of pets owned by the character wearing them. The flavor text for the gloves states, "The master and his hound were the most famed hunters of their day. He died fighting beside his favorite dog, just as the way he would have wanted it. His loyal companion soon followed."

== See also ==
- List of individual dogs
