= Equine recipients of the Dickin Medal =

From left to right: Olga, Regal and Upstart with their handlers at the Dickin Medal ceremony in 1947.

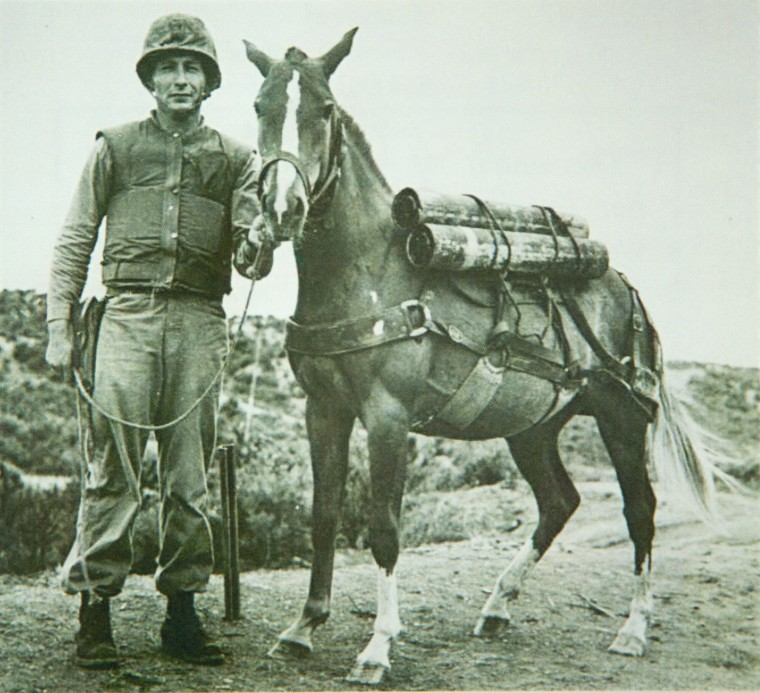
Sergeant Reckless

There have been five equine recipients of the Dickin Medal since its creation in 1943. The first three were British horses Regal, Olga, and Upstart, followed by the Canadian Corps Cavalry horse Warrior and the American Sergeant Reckless. The first three received their awards at a ceremony on 11 April 1947 at Hyde Park in recognition of the courage they exhibited during World War II. These three were mounts used by members of the Metropolitan Police Service during official duties and to aid civilians during the Blitz and later bombings from September 1940 to late 1944. Warrior served on the Western Front during World War I and was awarded an honorary posthumous medal in September 2014. Another posthumous award was given in 2016 to Sergeant Reckless, a mare who served during the Korean War with the United States Marine Corps and was given the rank of staff sergeant. Of the recipients, three were honoured for courage during active duty, one for remaining calm when his stable was bombed on two occasions and one to commemorate the actions of animals during the First World War. The first three horses were selected primarily as a way to honour the entire mounted police force instead of singling out any particular deed. Olga, Upstart and Regal are buried at the Metropolitan Police Mounted Training Establishment at Thames Ditton which also displays their medals in a museum.

== Metropolitan Police recipients ==
Approximately 186 horses were part of the Metropolitan Police mounted division during the second World War. Mounted patrols were stationed throughout London to aid in controlling traffic and improve the morale of Londoners during the frequent German V-1 and V-2 bombing raids that wracked the city during the early to mid-1940s. The horses typically had one handler during their entire career in the service and were required to remain calm during stressful situations.

=== Regal ===
Regal was a bay gelding with a small white star on his forehead and socks on his hind legs. (Note: Based on the above ceremony photograph.) Regal's handler during the war was P.C. Hector Poole. Regal served in the north London suburb of Muswell Hill. On 19 April 1941 during the closing months of the Blitz, incendiary bombs dropped near the Muswell Hill police stables caused a fire to erupt in the forage room, soon spreading to the area around Regal's stall. Not panicking, Regal was led out of the burning stable without injury. Three years later on 20 July 1944, the stable was again damaged when an explosion from a nearby V-1 flying bomb impact caused the station roof to partially collapse and injure Regal with flying debris.

=== Olga ===
Olga was a bay mare with a narrow white right front coronet marking. (Note: Based on a Dickin Medal publicity photograph.) She was used in crowd control and rescue operations in south London near Tooting. On 3 July 1944, Olga and PC J. E. Thwaites, who had replaced her usual rider, were patrolling Besley Street SW16 near the railway line when a bomb exploded 300 feet (91 m) in front of them. The explosion destroyed four houses, killed four people and caused a plate glass window to fall directly in front of Olga. Startled, the mare initially ran a short distance away from the blast until Thwaites was able to calm her and guide her back to the area. Quickly settling down, Olga allowed Thwaites to administer help to survivors and divert sightseers that had come to see the devastation away from the area.

=== Upstart ===
Upstart was a chestnut gelding with four white feet and a small star, narrow strip and a snip on his face. (Note: Based on the above ceremony photograph.) Upstart had been stabled near Hyde Park until enemy gunfire from an attack on a nearby ack-ack station damaged the stable. Relocated to east London after the attack, Upstart was patrolling a street in Bethnal Green with his handler DI J. Morley a few weeks after the bombing at Tooting when a bomb landed 75 feet (23 m) in front of the horse, showering horse and rider with bits of glass and shrapnel. Upstart remained unfazed and aided Morley in directing traffic and crowd control after the incident.

== First World War recipients ==
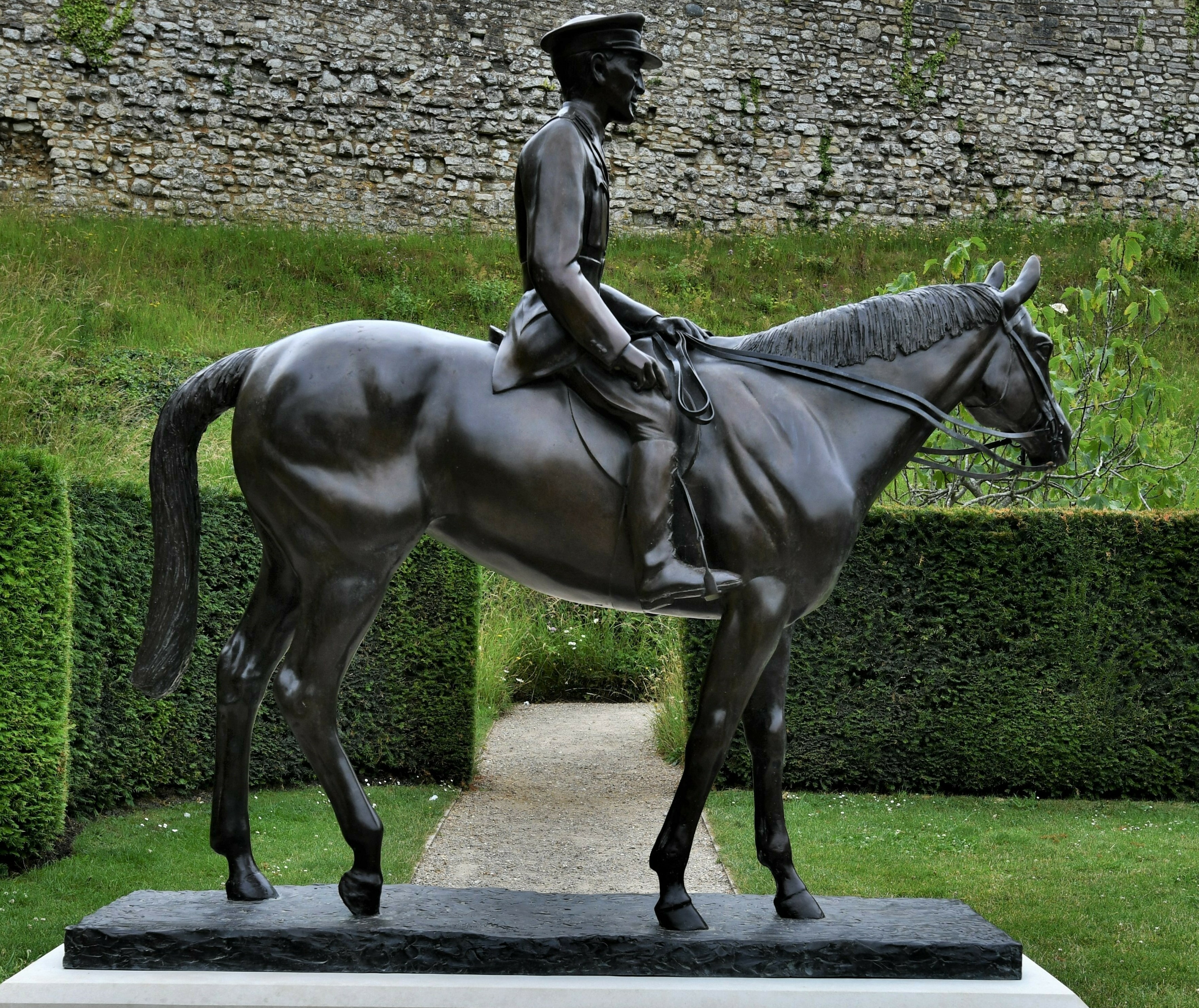
Statue with Warrior and Seely

Warrior was the warhorse of General Jack Seely, and served with him on the Western Front throughout the war, from 1914 to 1918. Warrior and Seely are depicted on a painting by Alfred Munnings in the collection of the National Gallery of Canada, Ottawa. Seely wrote a biography of his horse, My Horse Warrior, published in 1934.

Warrior was honoured on 2 September 2014, a posthumous honorary award to commemorate the contributions of all animals during the First World War. The medal, the 66th awarded, was presented to Seely's grandson, Brough Scott, a horse racing broadcaster.

Warrior survived the war, dying in 1941 at the age of 33. An obituary was printed in The Times, and Warrior features in a statue of Seely at Carisbrooke Castle on the Isle of Wight.

== Sergeant Reckless ==
Sergeant Reckless served as an ammunition carrier horse for the United States Marine Corps during the Korean War and was given the Dickin Medal for "her bravery and devotion to duty", noting that she had been wounded in battle twice and in particular her service during the Battle for Outpost Vegas in 1953 when she made 51 trips in one day, hauling ammunition up to the combat zone and bringing wounded soldiers back down.

== See also ==
- List of historical horses
