= Dickin Medal =

Award for animals in wartime

PDSA Dickin Medal
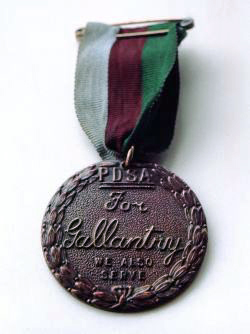
- The PDSA Dickin Medal (obverse)
- Awarded for: Conspicuous gallantry or devotion to duty while serving in military conflict.
- Country: United Kingdom
- Presented by: People's Dispensary for Sick Animals
- First award: 1943; 83 years ago
- Website: PDSA Dickin Medal
- PDSA Dickin Medal service ribbon

The PDSA Dickin Medal was instituted in 1943 in the United Kingdom by Maria Dickin to honour the work of animals in World War II. It is a bronze medallion, bearing the words "For Gallantry" and "We Also Serve" within a laurel wreath, carried on a ribbon of striped green, dark brown, and pale blue. It is awarded to animals that have displayed "conspicuous gallantry or devotion to duty while serving or associated with any branch of the Armed Forces or Civil Defence Units". The award is commonly referred to as "the animals' Victoria Cross".

Maria Dickin was the founder of the People's Dispensary for Sick Animals (PDSA), a British veterinary charity. She established the award for any animal displaying conspicuous gallantry and devotion to duty whilst serving with British Empire armed forces or civil emergency services. The medal was awarded 54 times between 1943 and 1949 – to 32 pigeons, 18 dogs, 3 horses, and a ship's cat – to acknowledge actions of gallantry or devotion during the Second World War and subsequent conflicts.

The awarding of the medal was revived in 2000. In December 2007, 12 former recipients buried at the PDSA Animal Cemetery in Ilford, Essex, Greater London, were afforded full military honours at the conclusion of a National Lottery-aided project to restore the cemetery.

As of January 2023, the Dickin Medal has been awarded 74 times, plus one honorary award made in 2014 to all the animals who served in the First World War.

== Recipients ==
The first recipients of the award, in December 1943, were three pigeons serving with the Royal Air Force who contributed to the recovery of aircrews from ditched aircraft. The most recent recipient is Bass, a Belgian Malinois who served with the US Marine Special Operation Command in Afghanistan.

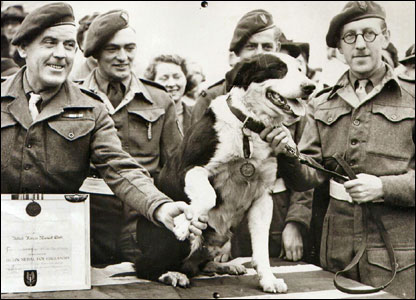
Rob the Collie, receiving his medal

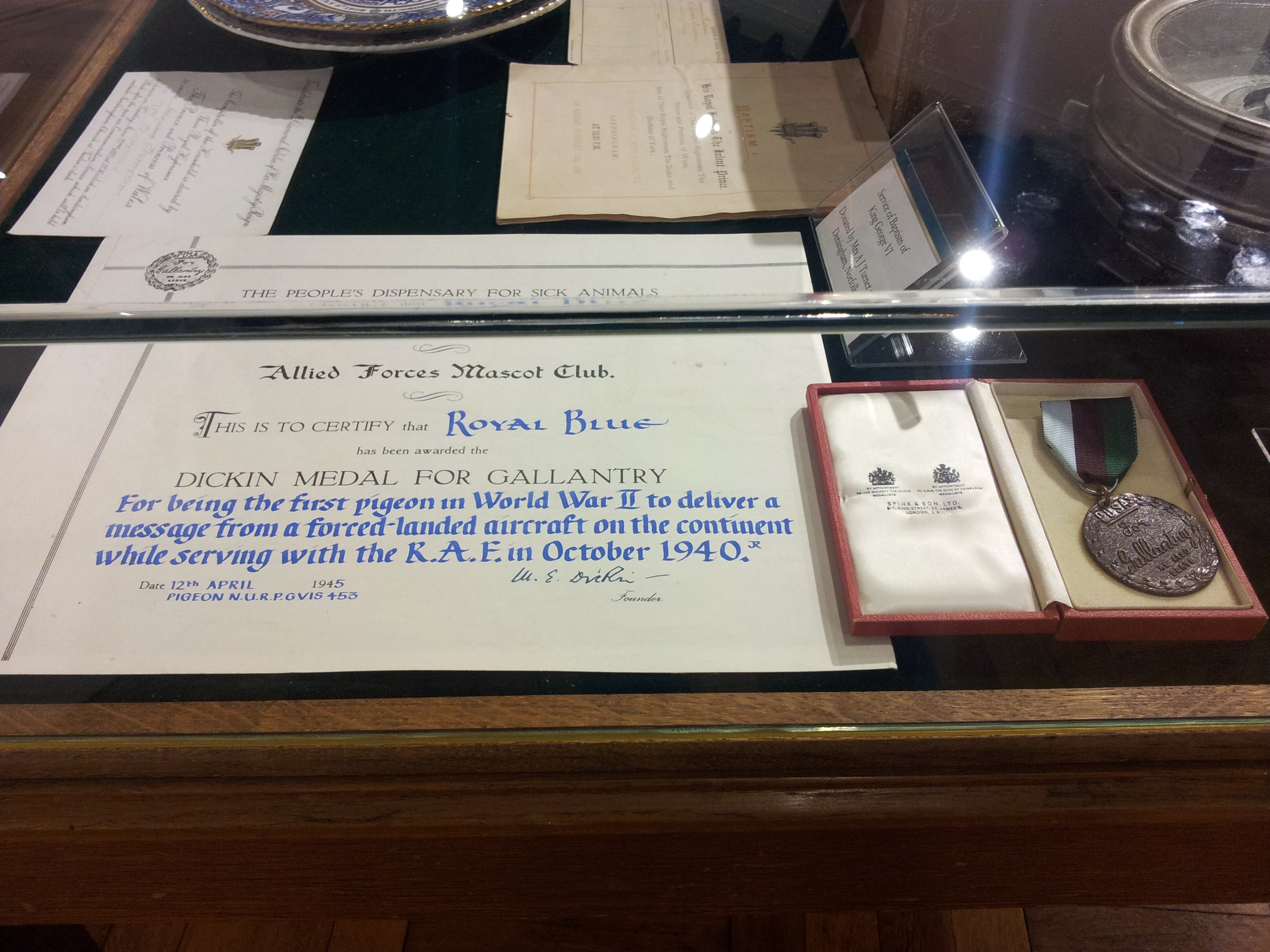
Dickin Medal and Certificate for the pigeon Royal Blue

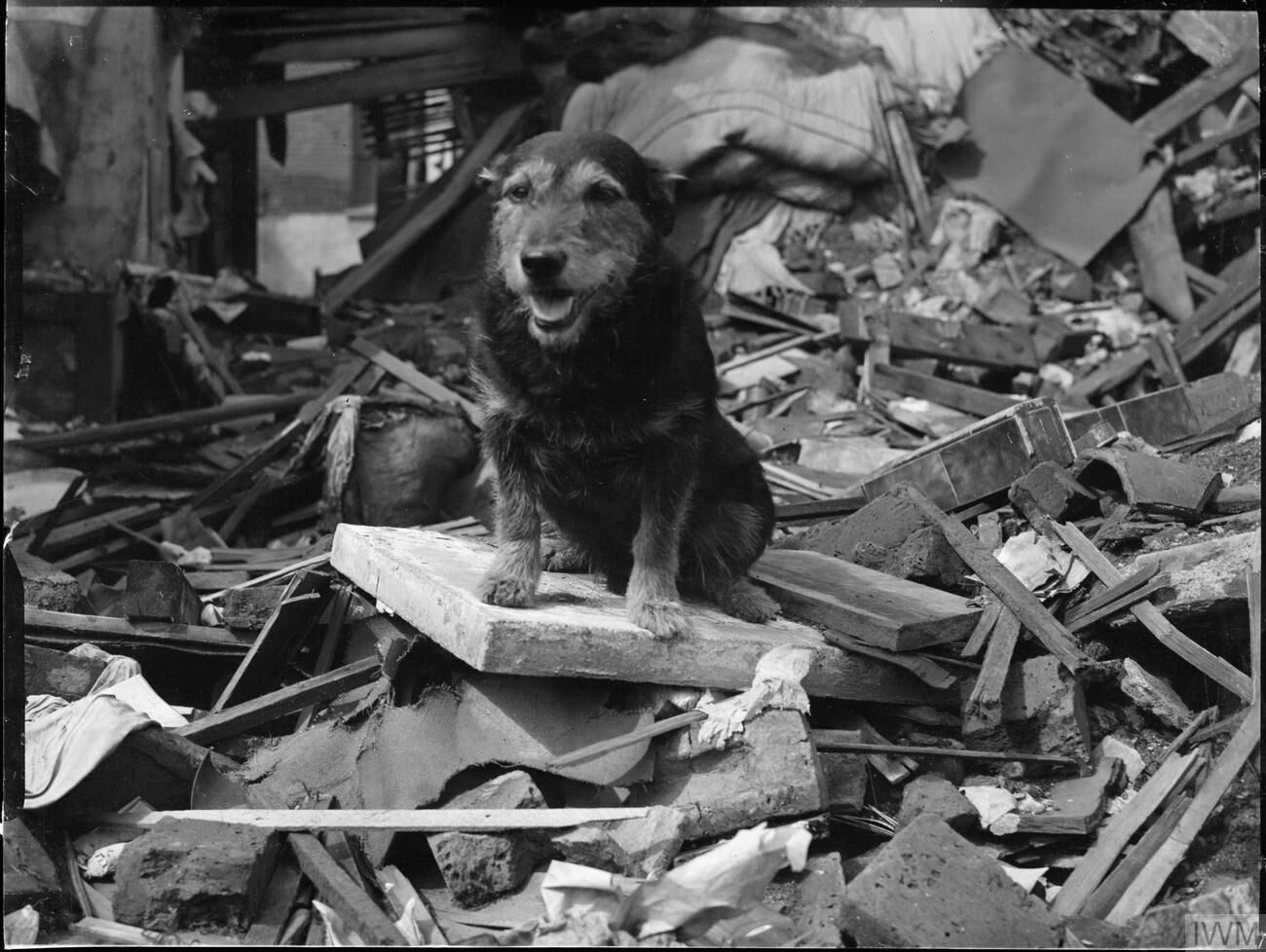
Rip helped locate a number of victims of The Blitz.

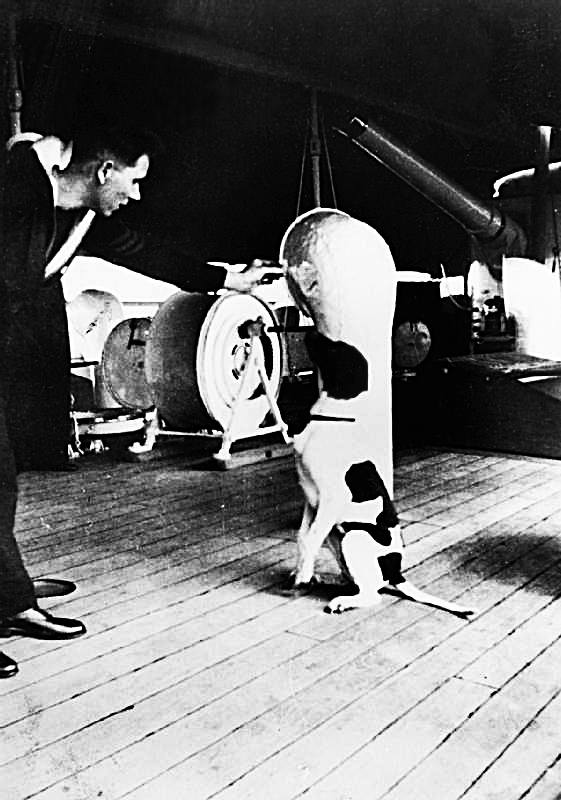
Judy was a ship's dog on both HMS Gnat and HMS Grasshopper.

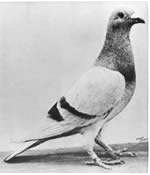
William of Orange was awarded the medal in 1945 for delivering a message from Operation Market Garden.

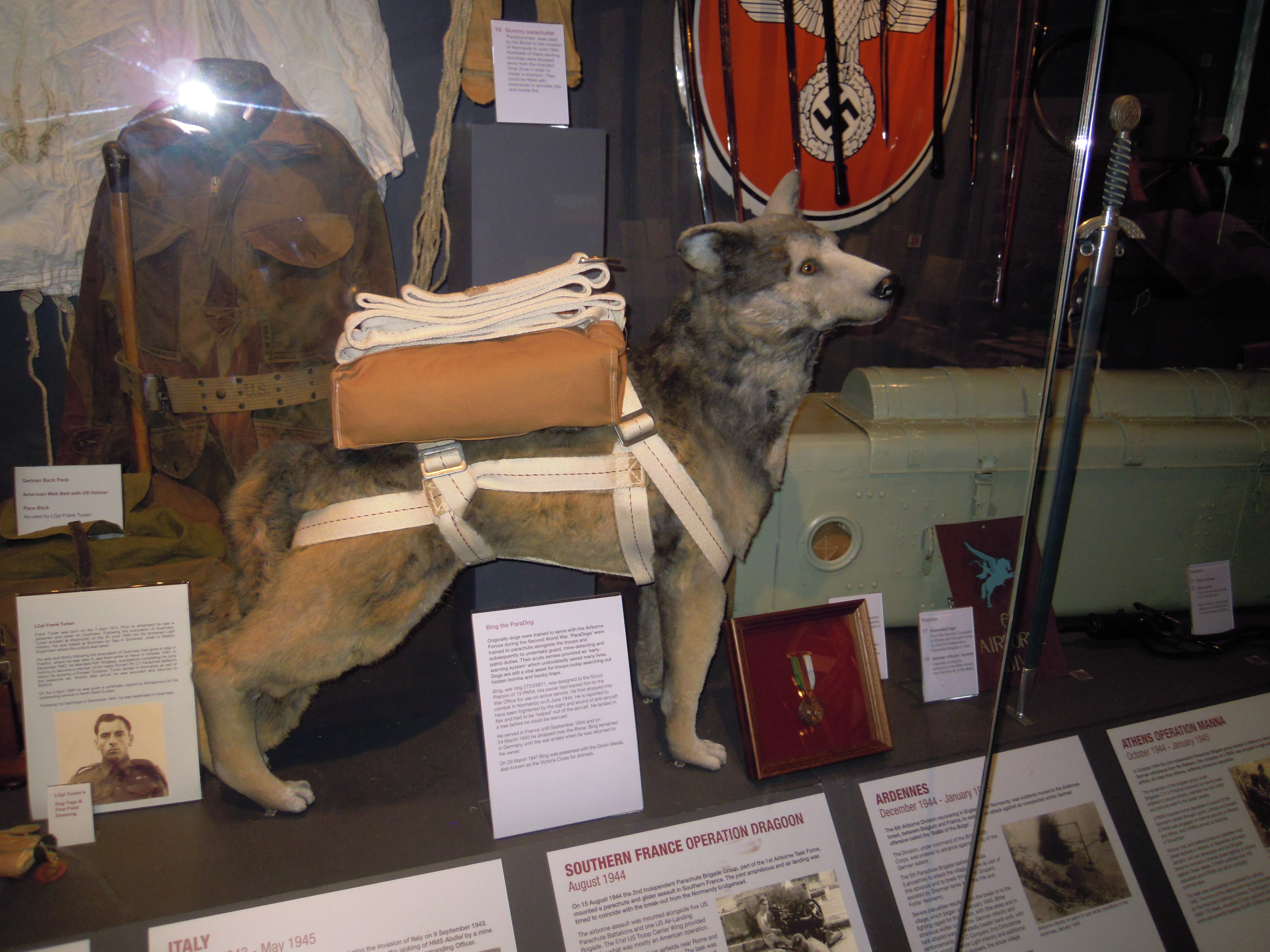
Bing the ParaDog displayed with his Dickin Medal at the Imperial War Museum Duxford

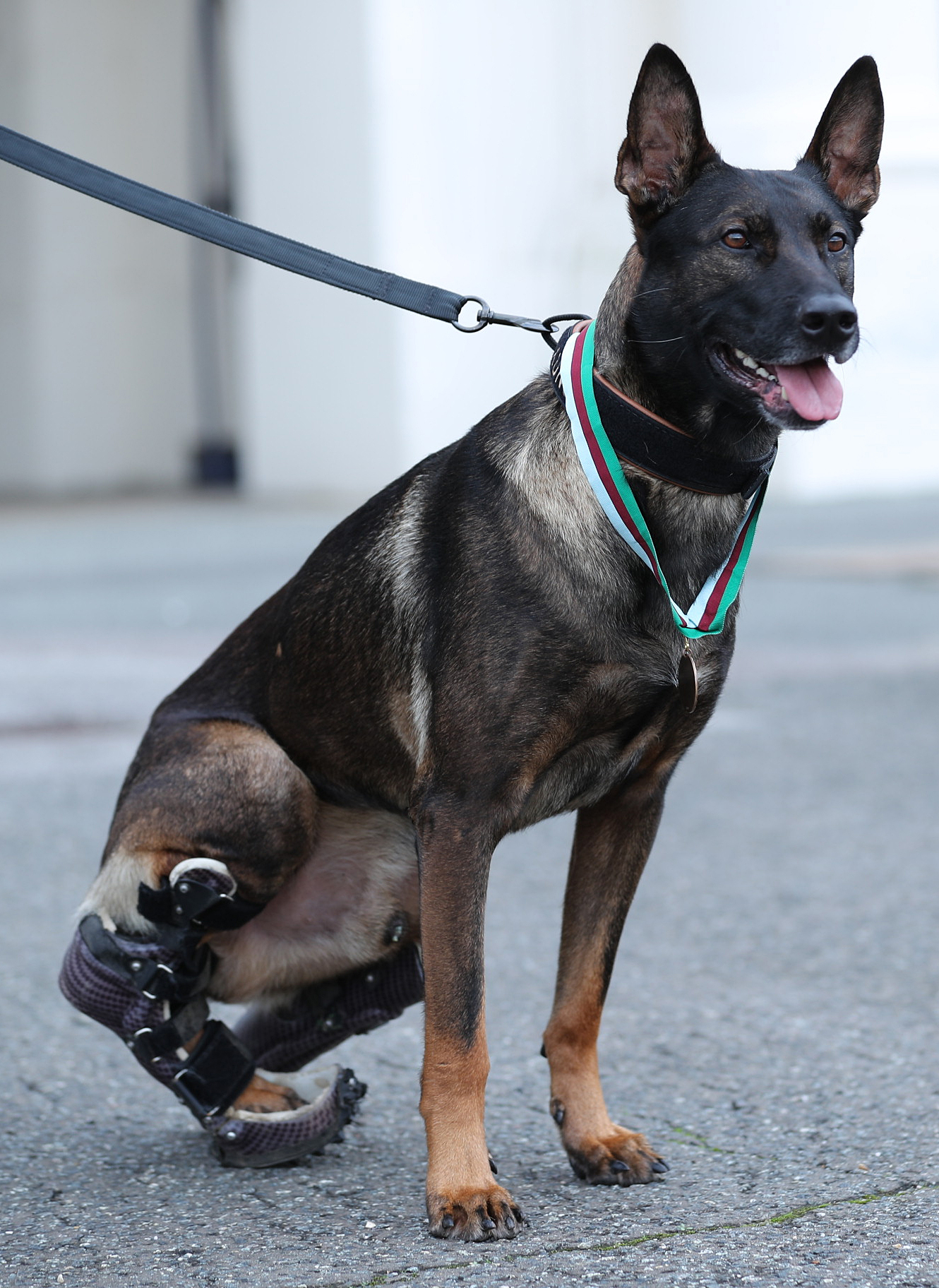
Kuno showing his prosthetic hind leg

Recipient(s)	Animal	Date of award	Notes	Ref(s)
White Vision	Pigeon	2 December 1943	Delivered a message that led to the rescue of a ditched aircrew in October 1943. She flew 9 hours in bad visibility and heavy weather with strong headwinds.	
Winkie	Pigeon	2 December 1943	Delivered a message that contributed to the rescue of a ditched aircrew in February 1942.	
Tyke	Pigeon	2 December 1943	Delivered a message that contributed to the rescue of a ditched aircrew in June 1943.	
Bob	Dog	24 March 1944	A mongrel, worked on patrol at Green Hill, North Africa; served with the 6th Battalion Queen's Own Royal West Kent Regiment.	
Beach Comber	Pigeon	1 September 1944	Brought the first news of the landings at Dieppe in 1942; served with the Canadian Army.	
Gustav	Pigeon	1 September 1944	Brought the first message from the Normandy beaches on 6 June 1944.	
Paddy	Pigeon	1 September 1944	Held best recorded time with a message from the Normandy Operations in June 1944.	
Rip	Dog	1945	A mongrel, located many victims of the air raids of The Blitz.	
Jet	Dog	12 January 1945	An Alsatian,^{[B]} assisted in the rescue of people trapped under blitzed buildings; served with the Civil Defence Service.	
Irma	Dog	12 January 1945	An Alsatian,^{[B]} assisted in the rescue of people trapped under blitzed buildings; served with the Civil Defence Service.	
Beauty	Dog	12 January 1945	A Wirehaired Terrier, assisted in the location of buried air-raid victims; served with a PDSA Rescue Squad.	
Rob	Dog	22 January 1945	A Collie, made over 20 parachute descents during the North African Campaign; served with the Special Air Service (SAS).^{[A]}	
Kenley Lass	Pigeon	March 1945	First pigeon to deliver intelligence from an agent in enemy-occupied France in October 1940; served with the National Pigeon Service. She was parachuted with the agent and released 12 days later to fly 300 miles back to home in less than 7 hours.	
Navy Blue	Pigeon	March 1945	Although injured, delivered a message from a raiding party in France, June 1944.	
Flying Dutchman	Pigeon	March 1945	Delivered three messages from agents in the Netherlands; missing in action on the fourth mission in 1944.	
Dutch Coast	Pigeon	March 1945	Delivered an SOS message from a ditched aircrew 288 miles in 7.5 hours in April 1942.	
Commando	Pigeon	March 1945	Delivered three messages from agents in occupied France; served with the National Pigeon Service.	
Royal Blue	Pigeon	March 1945	First pigeon of the war to deliver a message from a forced landed aircraft on the Continent in October 1940.	
Thorn	Dog	2 March 1945	An Alsatian,^{[B]} located air-raid casualties in a burning building; served with the Civil Defence Service.	
Rifleman Khan	Dog	27 March 1945	An Alsatian,^{[B]} rescued a soldier from drowning while under heavy shell fire during the assault of Walcheren in November 1944; served with the 6th Battalion Cameronians.	
Rex	Dog	April 1945	An Alsatian,^{[B]} located casualties in burning buildings; served with the Civil Defence Service.	
Ruhr Express	Pigeon	May 1945	Carried an important message from the Ruhr Pocket in April 1945.	
William of Orange	Pigeon	May 1945	Held the record time for delivering a message from the Arnhem Airborne Operation; served with the National Pigeon Service (Army).	
Scotch Lass	Pigeon	June 1945	Brought 38 microphotographs across the North Sea from the Netherlands, despite injury, in September 1944.	
Sheila	Dog	2 July 1945	A Collie, assisted in the rescue of four American airmen lost on the Cheviot Hills in a blizzard after a crash in December 1944 (first civilian animal to be awarded).	
Billy	Pigeon	August 1945	Delivered a message from a bomber that had been force-landed in 1942.	
Broad Arrow	Pigeon	October 1945	Brought three important messages from the Continent in 1943; served with the National Pigeon Service (Special Section).	
NPS.42.NS.2780	Pigeon	October 1945	Brought three important messages from the Continent in 1942 and 1943; served with the National Pigeon Service (Special Section).	
NPS.42.NS.7524	Pigeon	October 1945	Brought three important messages from the Continent in 1942 and 1943; served with the National Pigeon Service (Special Section).	
Maquis	Pigeon	October 1945	Brought three important messages from the Continent from 1943 and 1944; served with the National Pigeon Service (Special Section).	
Mary of Exeter	Pigeon	November 1945	Showed outstanding endurance on war service despite injury.	
Peter	Dog	November 1945	A Collie, located people trapped under blitzed buildings; served with the Civil Defence Service.	
Tommy	Pigeon	February 1946	Delivered a message from the Netherlands to Lancashire in July 1942; served with the National Pigeon Service.	
All Alone	Pigeon	February 1946	Delivered an important message following a flight of over 400 miles in one day in August 1943; served with the National Pigeon Service.	
Judy	Dog	May 1946	A pedigree Pointer, helped keep morale high among fellow prisoners in a Japanese prisoner-of-war camp.	
Princess	Pigeon	May 1946	Completed a special mission to Crete, a journey of more than 500 miles over sea, with valuable information.	
Mercury	Pigeon	August 1946	Carried out a special task involving a 480-mile flight from Northern Denmark in 1942; served with the National Pigeon Service (Special Section).	
NURP.38.BPC.6	Pigeon	August 1946	Made three flights in 1941; served with the National Pigeon Service (Special Section).	
G.I. Joe	Pigeon	August 1946	Flew 20 miles in as many minutes, delivering a message that is credited with saving at least 100 lives; served with the United States Army Pigeon Service.	
Punch and Judy	Dogs	November 1946	Boxers, saved two British officers in Palestine by attacking a nationalist.	
Cologne	Pigeon	1947	Homed from a crashed aircraft over Cologne despite injury in 1943.	
Duke of Normandy	Pigeon	8 January 1947	First bird to arrive with message from paratroops of 21st Army Group on D Day (6 June 1944); served with the National Pigeon Service.	
NURP.43.CC.1418	Pigeon	8 January 1947	Fastest flight carrying a message from the 6th Airborne Division from Normandy, 7 June 1944; served with the National Pigeon Service.	
DD.43.T.139	Pigeon	February 1947	Brought message of foundered ship in the Huon Gulf in time to salvage it and its cargo; served with the Royal Australian Corps of Signals.	
DD.43.Q.879	Pigeon	February 1947	Only survivor of three pigeons released to warn of an impending counter-attack at Manus Island. Reached headquarters in time to extract a US Marine Corps patrol; served with the Royal Australian Corps of Signals.	
Ricky	Dog	29 March 1947	A Welsh Collie, located mines along a canal bank at Nederweert in the Netherlands, despite being injured by one.	
Bing	Dog	29 March 1947	An Alsatian,^{[B]} parachuted into Normandy with 13th Battalion, 6th Airborne Division.	
Olga	Horse	11 April 1947	Controlled traffic and assisted rescue operations following a flying bomb explosion in Tooting; served with the police.	
Upstart	Horse	11 April 1947	Controlled traffic following a flying bomb exploding in Bethnal Green; served with the police.	
Regal	Horse	11 April 1947	Remained calm despite being subject to stable fires in Muswell Hill caused by explosive incendiaries on two separate occasions.	
Simon	Cat	August 1949	HMS Amethyst's ship's cat, awarded for "gallantry under fire" and for the disposal of many rats despite shrapnel injuries during the Yangtze Incident in 1949. He remains the only cat to ever receive the award.	
Antis	Dog	28 January 1949	An Alsatian,^{[B]} served with Václav Robert Bozděch, a Czech airman, in the French Air Force and in the No. 311 (Czechoslovak) Squadron RAF in Britain, and helped his master escape after the death of Jan Masaryk.	
Tich	Dog	1 July 1949	A mongrel, awarded for courage and devotion between 1941 and 1945; served with the 1st Battalion King's Royal Rifle Corps.	
Gander	Dog	27 October 2000	A Newfoundland, saved Canadian infantrymen on at least three separate occasions during the Battle of Lye Mun on Hong Kong Island in December 1941; killed in action gathering a grenade.	
Apollo	Dog	5 March 2002	A German Shepherd, received the award on behalf of all search-and-rescue dogs who assisted in the aftermath of the September 11 attacks in 2001.	
Salty and Roselle	Dogs	5 March 2002	Labrador guide dogs, led their blind owners down more than 70 flights of stairs to escape from the damaged World Trade Center in September 2001.	
Sam	Dog	14 January 2003	A German Shepherd, brought down an armed man and held back rioters while serving in Bosnia and Herzegovina in April 1998; served with The Royal Canadian Regiment on assignment from the Royal Army Veterinary Corps.	
Buster	Dog	9 December 2003	A Springer Spaniel, located a weapons arsenal in Safwan, Southern Iraq in March 2003; served with the Duke of Wellington's Regiment.	
Lucky	Dog	6 February 2007	A German Shepherd, the only member of a four-dog team to survive tracking nationalists in Malaya from 1949 to 1952; served with the Royal Air Force Police.	
Sadie	Dog	6 February 2007	A Labrador, detected explosive devices, which were subsequently disarmed, while serving in Kabul, Afghanistan, in November 2005; served with the Royal Gloucestershire, Berkshire and Wiltshire Regiment.	
Treo	Dog	24 February 2010	A Labrador-Spaniel crossbreed, located improvised explosive devices while serving in Helmand Province, Afghanistan in August and September 2008; served with Royal Army Veterinary Corps.	
Theo	Dog	25 October 2012	A Springer Spaniel, who located improvised explosive devices while serving in Afghanistan; holds the record for most operational finds by an arms and explosives search dog with 14. Died from an apparent seizure after his handler was killed by enemy fire earlier that day.	
Sasha	Dog	29 April 2014	A Labrador who located 15 improvised explosive devices, mortars, mines, and weapons while serving in Afghanistan, with the Royal Army Veterinary Corps. In July 2008 Sasha and her handler were killed in a Taliban ambush by a rocket-propelled grenade.	
Warrior	Horse	2 September 2014	Honorary award to a First World War warhorse to commemorate the contributions of all animals during the conflict.	
Diesel	Dog	28 December 2015	A Belgian Malinois RAID assault dog employed by the French police who was killed by suspected terrorists in the 2015 Saint-Denis raid on 18 November 2015 in Paris.	
Lucca	Dog	5 April 2016	A German Shepherd who worked with the United States Marine Corps for six years before losing a leg in an IED explosion.	
Sergeant Reckless	Horse	28 July 2016	A Mongolian mare who held rank in the United States Marine Corps in the Korean War. On one day she made 51 solo trips to resupply multiple front line units.	
Mali	Dog	17 November 2017	A Belgian Malinois who worked with the Special Boat Service in Afghanistan in 2012. During an 8-hour assault against a Taliban position, the dog indicated the locations of enemy combatants, despite being injured three times by grenade explosions.	
Chips	Dog	15 January 2018	A Husky crossbreed, for bravery and devotion to duty during the U.S. Army's invasion of Sicily on 10 July 1943.	
Kuga	Dog	26 October 2018	A Belgian Malinois, for actions during an Australian Special Operations Task Group patrol in Uruzgan province, Afghanistan. Kuga, who was shot five times during the action, served with the Special Air Service Regiment (SASR) from 2008 until his death from wounds in 2012.	
Kuno	Dog	29 August 2020	A Belgian Malinois, for courage under fire during a Special Boat Service raid against al-Qaeda in Afghanistan. When forces were pinned down by grenade and machine-gun fire, Kuno was sent in wearing night-vision goggles to attack the gunman, and wrestled him to the ground despite being shot in both hind legs. The injuries he sustained required part of one of his hind paws to be amputated, and he received a prosthesis to replace it after his return to Britain.	
Leuk	Dog	23 April 2021	A Belgian Malinois of the French Special Forces, for courage and playing a key role during anti-terrorist operations, and for saving the lives of his handler and colleagues.	
Hertz	Dog	22 February 2022	A German Shorthaired Pointer of the Royal Air Force Police for detecting electronic equipment during the war in Afghanistan.	
Bass	Dog	24 January 2023	A Belgian Malinois of the US Marine Special Operation Command for his life-saving actions during a deployment in Afghanistan in 2019.	

- A Rob was awarded the Dickin Medal in 1945 for taking part in more than 20 parachute drops and for his involvement in operations behind enemy lines in Italy and North Africa during the Second World War. There is evidence that his record is a hoax concocted by the training officer at 2nd SAS at the time so that the dog would remain with the regiment.
- B The German Shepherd Dog breed was renamed in the UK by The Kennel Club in 1919 to Alsatian Wolf Dog. During the 1920s, the Wolf Dog part of the name fell out of use and dogs of this breed were simply known as Alsatians. The name had been reverted in most countries by 1977 to German Shepherd Dog.

== See also ==
Animals

- Swansea Jack (1930–1937) – twice decorated by the National Canine Defence League before the introduction of the Dickin Medal
- List of individual dogs

Honouring animals

- Animals in War Memorial – commemorating the countless animals that have served and died under British military command throughout history
- PDSA Gold Medal – an equivalent of the Dickin Medal for civilian animals
- Purple poppy – a symbol of remembrance in the United Kingdom for animals that served during wartime
- Animals in War & Peace Medal of Bravery – an American award patterned after the Dickin Medal, first awarded in 2019

Animals in war

- Dogs in warfare – the history and work done by duty dogs
- Horses in warfare – the history and work done by duty horses

Animals assisting veterans

- Bravehound – Scottish charity that supports former servicemen, women and their families, providing training and dogs to support veterans
- Hounds for Heroes – British charity helping train and provide service dogs to wounded British Armed Forces and Emergency Services men and women
