= Treo (dog) =

British arms and explosives detection dog

- Species: Canis familiaris
- Breed: Labrador Retriever-English Springer Spaniel cross
- Sex: Male
- Born: c. 2001
- Died: 2015 (aged 13–14)
- Notable role: Detection dog
- Years active: 2002–2009
- Owner: Dave Heyhoe
- Appearance: Black coat
- Awards: Dickin Medal

Treo (c. 2001–2015) was a black Labrador Retriever-English Springer Spaniel crossbreed and a retired Arms and Explosives Search dog with the Royal Army Veterinary Corps. He was awarded the Dickin Medal (considered the equivalent of a Victoria Cross for animals) in February 2010. The military nominated Treo for the award in recognition of his help uncovering a number of improvised explosive devices (IED) during his time serving in Helmand Province, an insurgency hot spot, in 2008. Treo was the medal's 63rd recipient.

== Early life ==
Treo was donated to the Army because of his general behaviour issues and inclination to snapping and growling at people. His former owners' hopes were that the Army would straighten him out. He began a 12-week training course at the Defence Animal Centre after which he was deployed to Northern Ireland for three years with his first handler. When his first handler left the Army, Sergeant Dave Heyhoe took over control of Treo.

== Service in Afghanistan ==
In 2008, Treo and his handler Sergeant Heyhoe were deployed to Afghanistan, becoming one of 25 dogs supporting British troops there. On 1 August 2008, Treo found an IED, called a daisy chain because of the way multiple explosive devices are wired together, concealed by Taliban insurgents along the side of a road. In September 2008, he found a second daisy chain, both times saving the lives of British soldiers as well as civilians. His success at detecting IEDs did not go unnoticed by the insurgents, and intercepted radio traffic included conversations about "the black dog." He retired in August 2009 and was awarded the Dickin Medal in February 2010 at the Imperial War Museum in London.

The Dickin Medal is often referred to as the animal equivalent of the Victoria Cross.

== Later life ==
After seven years in the military, Treo retired to live at home with Heyhoe. His death was announced in October 2015, and Heyhoe buried him with his Dickin Medal and a Union Jack.

== See also ==
- Dogs in warfare
- List of individual dogs § War dogs
- Bravehound
