= Jet of Iada =

Dickin Medal-winning dog

- Mrs Babcock Cleaver with Jet of Iada wearing his Dickin Medal
- Other name: Jet
- Species: Canis familiaris
- Breed: Alsatian
- Sex: Male
- Born: 21 July 1942; Mossley Hill, Liverpool
- Died: 18 October 1949 (aged 7)
- Resting place: Calderstones Park, Liverpool; 53°22′54″N 2°53′39″W
- Nationality: United Kingdom
- Notable role: Dogs in warfare / Search and rescue dog
- Owner: Mrs Babcock Cleaver
- Parents: Sire: Jamie of Eggerness; Dam: Iada Dilah of Lilias
- Awards: Dickin Medal; RSPCA Medallion for Valor

Jet of Iada a.k.a. Jet (21 July 1942 – 18 October 1949) was a German Shepherd Dog, who assisted in the rescue of 150 people trapped under blitzed buildings. He was a pedigree dog born in Liverpool, and served with the Civil Defence Services of London. He was awarded both the Dickin Medal and the RSPCA's Medallion of Valor for his rescue efforts.

== Early life ==
Jet was born in Liverpool in the Iada kennel of Mrs Babcock Cleaver in July 1942. He was a black German Shepherd Dog, and in the kennel was initially called Jet, with his full pedigree name being Jet of Iada. He was loaned to be trained at the War Dogs School in Gloucester from the age of nine months, where he was trained in anti-sabotage work. Following eighteen months work on airfields performing anti-sabotage duties he was returned to the school for further training in search and rescue duties where he was partnered with Corporal Wardle.

They were relocated to London. Corporal Wardle and Jet were the first handler and dog to be used in an official capacity in Civil Defence rescue duties.

== Awards ==
He was awarded the Dickin Medal on 12 January 1945 for saving the lives of over fifty people trapped in bombed buildings. The dedication read "For being responsible for the rescue of persons trapped under blitzed buildings while serving with the Civil Defence Services of London." Following the war, he was returned to his owner in Liverpool. The Dickin Medal is often referred to as the animal metaphorical equivalent of the Victoria Cross.

On 15 August 1947, an explosion occurred in the William Pit near Whitehaven, Cumbria. Dogs trained in body recovery work were unavailable, so two dogs were sent from the RAF Police Dog School at Staverton, and Jet was collected from his owner on the journey north. After his efforts helped save the rescuers he was awarded the RSPCA's Medallion of Valor.

There is a memorial to Jet in the English flower garden of Calderstones Park, Liverpool near where he is buried. This memorial was cleaned in July 2016 by pupils of Childwall Church of England Primary School and The Reader in celebration of Jet's Birthday. Also in attendance was 93 year old Lilias Ward (née Cleaver) Jet's former owner.

== Pedigree ==
Int Ch. Cara V. Blasunberg of Welham
Hero of Picardy
Cillallah of Picardy
Heroson of Kings
Int Ch. Dovar V. Overstoyler of GD
Fanny of Ceara
Ch. Welham Susi V. Boll
Jamie of Eggerness
Allei of Picardy
Ch. Janitor of Picardy
Beda V. Anderton of Picardy
Beauty of Haddon
Dominant of Picardy
Soceress of Haddon
Rola V. Haus Shutting
Jet of Iada
Ch. Armin Ernalieb
Ch. Dolf of Ceara
Int Ch. Seffe Von Blasienburg
Horst of Dundator
Ch. Benigh of Picardy
Deirdre of Dundator
Abba of Dundator
Iada Dilah of Lilias
Billo V. Amerbach
Ch. Chief of Chorltonville
Ali of Chorltonville
Jubilee of Stoneycroft
Ch. Odin of Penyghent
Jetta of Dysbrook
Citah of Dysbrook

Jet's Family Tree

== See also ==
- List of individual dogs
