= National Pigeon Service =

Civilian organisation formed in Britain in 1938

The National Pigeon Service (NPS) was a volunteer civilian organisation formed in Britain in 1938 as result of representations made to the Committee of Imperial Defence and the British Government by Major W. H. Osman. During 1939-45 over 200,000 young pigeons were given to the services by the British pigeon breeders of the NPS. The birds were used by the Royal Air Force and the Army and Intelligence Services, Special Section of the Army Pigeon Service (which was formed in World War I by Lt. Col. A. H. Osman). During three and a half years of World War II, 16,554 war pigeons were parachuted onto the continent. One of these was Commando, a red chequer cock bird that became a recipient of the Dickin Medal. Many other NPS pigeons also received the Dickin Medal.

== Canister colour code ==
Pigeons were used by a variety of services and the canisters affixed to their legs were colour-coded to distinguish recipients.

- Red = US Forces + British Army
- Blue = US Forces + British RAF
- Blue with coloured disk = British RAF
- Blue with white patch = RAF
- Red with coloured disk = British Special Service
- Grey = British Special Service
- Green = British Special Service
- Black = British Civil Police
- Yellow = British Commercial

== Pigeon NURP 40 TW 194 ==
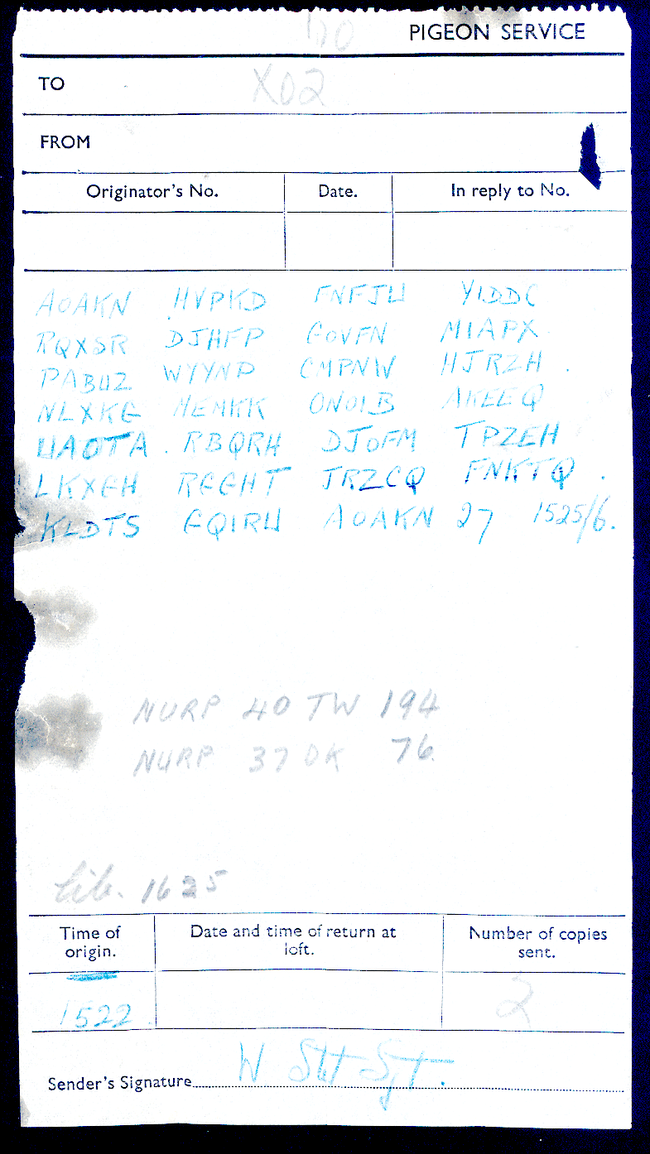
NURP 40 TW 194's Pigeon Service message.

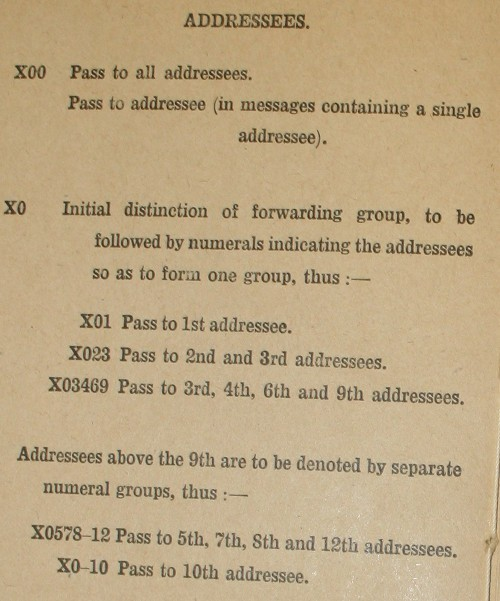
Army Wireless Operating Signals 1941 (UK) Addresses

In 1982, the skeleton of a carrier pigeon was found inside a home chimney in Bletchingley, Surrey, in the southeast United Kingdom. Inside a red canister (see above) attached to one of its legs was an encrypted message handwritten on a Pigeon Service form. The message was addressed to "XO2," which is thought by some to be RAF Bomber Command, alternatively corresponds to a signals routing code "forward to second recipient", - the recipients being identified in the code text - and is signed "W Stot Sjt." probably Sergeant William Stott. It is believed to have been sent from France on 6 June 1944 during the World War II D-day invasion. The message consists of 27 five-letter groups, with the first and last group identical. As of February 2019, the message has not been deciphered. Britain's GCHQ, the successor to Bletchley Park has asked for any information the public might have about the message.

The cipher text reads:

AOAKN HVPKD FNFJU YIDDC
RQXSR DJHFP GOVFN MIAPX
PABUZ WYYNP CMPNW HJRZH
NLXKG MEMKK ONOIB AKEEQ
UAOTA RBQRH DJOFM TPZEH
LKXGH RGGHT JRZCQ FNKTQ
KLDTS GQIRU AOAKN 27 1525/6

The form indicates that two copies of the message were sent. Additional notations, in a colour different from the code groups and signature, are "NURP 40 TW 194" and "NURP 37 OK(or DK) 76." These identify the specific birds used. NURP stands for "National Union of Racing Pigeons." The pigeon whose remains were found is apparently 40 TW 194. 40 and 37 refer to the year the pigeons were hatched. The code DK and TW are believed to refer to Dorking and Twickenham.

Wide press coverage was given to a solution proposed by Gord Young of Canada, based on a World War I coding book. It explains 7 of the 26 unique code groups as ad hoc acronyms, such as "FNFJW - Final Note [ confirming ] Found Jerry's Whereabouts" — the usual reading of the group is "FNFJU", while the hand has a very square U, the W is quite distinct. However, Michael Smith, a former British army intelligence operator and advisor to Bletchley Park, dismissed Young's purported decryption as "nonsense", explaining "a World War One code … wouldn’t have been used because it would have been well known to the Germans and insecure." The Government Communications Headquarters (GCHQ) has stated "without access to the original code books, details of any additional encryption, or any context around the message, it will be impossible to decode. Similarly it means that any proposed solutions sent to GCHQ will, without such material, be impossible to prove correct."

Some sources have suggested the code was a one-time pad.
