= People's Dispensary for Sick Animals =

Veterinary charity in the United Kingdom

- Founded: 1917; 109 years ago
- Founder: Maria Dickin CBE
- Purpose: Animal welfare
- Region served: United Kingdom
- Volunteers: 2,800+
- Website: pdsa.org.uk

The People's Dispensary for Sick Animals (PDSA) is a British veterinary charity that provides free veterinary services, carrying out over one million consultations annually. It was founded in 1917 by Maria Dickin to care for sick and injured animals belonging to people on low incomes. Until 2009, the PDSA was the largest private employer of fully qualified veterinary surgeons and veterinary nurses in the United Kingdom. Access to the charity's services is restricted to those living within its designated catchment areas.

== Foundation and development ==
During the First World War, animal welfare campaigner Maria Dickin opened a clinic in Whitechapel, London, to address the poor state of animal health in the area. She aimed to provide a facility where residents of the East End living in poverty could receive free treatment for their sick and injured animals. Despite widespread scepticism, she opened the free "dispensary" in a basement on 17 November 1917. A sign outside read: "Bring your sick animals! Do not let them suffer! All animals treated. All treatment free."

On its first day, the dispensary treated four animals, including a limping donkey. The donkey's owner, impressed by the free services, began promoting the clinic by telling others about his experience. Demand quickly increased, forcing Dickin to relocate the clinic from a clergyman's cellar to a shop with four rooms in Mile End, opposite the People's Palace.

By 1922, the PDSA had opened seven clinics across London, treating up to 70,000 animals annually. Within six years of establishing the first clinic, Dickin had designed and equipped the organisation's first horse-drawn mobile clinic, followed by a fleet of mobile dispensaries.

In 1923, the PDSA opened its first clinic outside London, in Salford. This was followed in 1928 by the establishment of a sanatorium in Ilford, used to train PDSA practitioners. By 1926–27, the charity was operating 57 clinics and three travelling caravans, treating almost 410,000 animals annually at a cost of £43,085.

In November 1931, the PDSA held its annual Christmas market at the Royal Albert Hall. The event featured what was then the largest Christmas pudding ever made, weighing 10 tons. The recipe became known as the "Prince of Wales' Empire Christmas Pudding" after the Prince of Wales (later Edward VIII), who was a patron of the charity. In 1973, Princess Alexandra, The Honourable Lady Ogilvy, became the charity's patron.

By 1935, the organisation operated 11 motor caravan clinics nationwide. At the outbreak of the Second World War, it ran five animal hospitals, 71 dispensaries, and 11 mobile caravan dispensaries. Its rescue squads assisted more than 250,000 pets injured or trapped during the Blitz.

People's Dispensary for Sick Animals Act 1949
- Act of Parliament
- Parliament of the United Kingdom
- Long title: An Act to incorporate and confer powers upon the People's Dispensary for Sick Animals and for other purposes.
- Citation: 12, 13 & 14 Geo. 6. c. xv

Dates
- Royal assent: 14 July 1949

Text of statute as originally enacted

People's Dispensary for Sick Animals Act 1956
- Act of Parliament
- Parliament of the United Kingdom
- Long title: An Act to amend the People's Dispensary for Sick Animals Act 1949 to confer further powers on the People's Dispensary for Sick Animals and for other purposes.
- Citation: 4 & 5 Eliz. 2. c. lxvii

Dates
- Royal assent: 5 July 1956

Text of statute as originally enacted

The role and powers of the PDSA were formally established through two Acts of Parliament: the People's Dispensary for Sick Animals Act 1949 (12, 13 & 14 Geo. 6. c. xv) and the People's Dispensary for Sick Animals Act 1956 (4 & 5 Eliz. 2. c. lxvii). These Acts continue to govern the organisation's activities.

== Awards ==
In 1943, Maria Dickin established the Dickin Medal to recognise acts of outstanding bravery by animals serving with the Armed Forces or Civil Defence units. The award, administered by the PDSA, is often referred to as the animals' Victoria Cross.

In 2002, the PDSA introduced a second bravery award, the PDSA Gold Medal, which is regarded as the animal equivalent of the George Cross.

The PDSA Order of Merit was created in 2014 to honour notable examples of animal devotion to their owners or to society, and is considered the animal equivalent of the Order of the British Empire. As of 19 February 2021, the award had been presented to 12 horses, the first being police horse Grace, and 20 dogs, the most recent being Springer Spaniel Max, the first pet to receive the honour.

== Eligibility requirements ==
The PDSA provides eligible pet owners with preventive services such as neutering, vaccinations and microchipping. These services are not free of charge but are offered at cost.

Although treatment is provided free of charge, the PDSA requests that clients make a voluntary donation towards the cost of their animals' care. In 2009, the charity began requesting donations when an animal was checked in for treatment.

As of 2005, the PDSA was able to provide services to 75% of those eligible and planned to increase this to 80% or more in subsequent years.

== Areas of operation ==
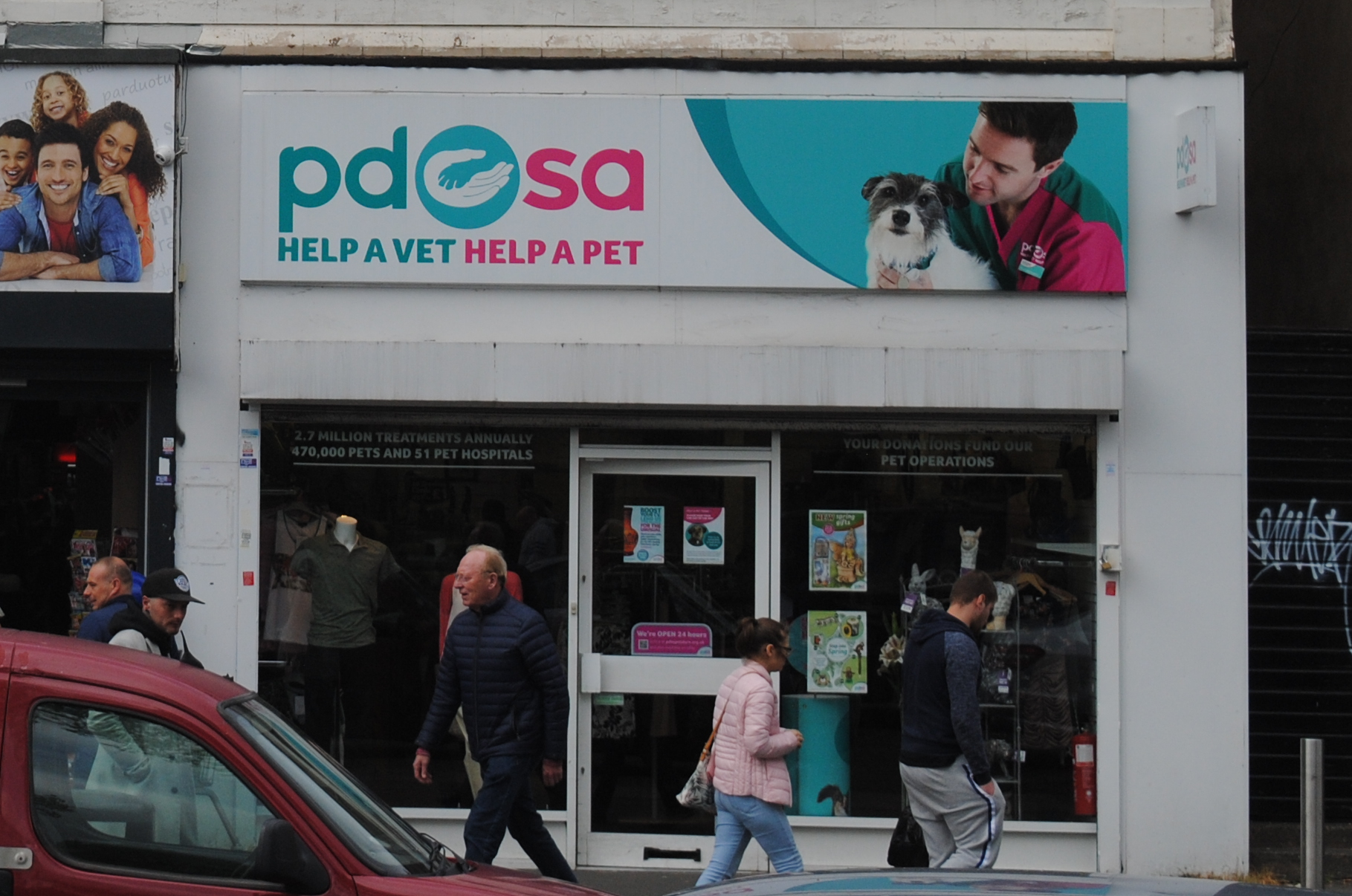
A PDSA charity shop in Birmingham, England, seen in April 2019

The PDSA operates throughout Great Britain via a network of animal hospitals and practices, supported by a large number of charity shops. It has one animal hospital in Northern Ireland, serving much of the area east of the River Bann. Although no further hospitals are currently planned for the region, some services may be offered through private clinics. A charity shop in Lisburn was scheduled to open in March 2007. The charity's head office is located in Telford, Shropshire.

In 1937, a branch of the PDSA was established in District Six, Cape Town, then a poverty-stricken area of South Africa. The branch became autonomous in 1988 but maintains close links with the parent organisation in the United Kingdom, with a significant exchange of information between them.

In October 1938, the PDSA held its Twenty-First Birthday Dinner at the Holborn Restaurant in London, attended by Maria Dickin. The event included messages from representatives in France (Mr Horne), the Dutch East Indies (Mr Cronin), Romania (Mr Smith) and Greece (Mr Hurle).

== Roobarb and Custard partnership ==
In 2012, Bulldog Licensing, the brand licensing agency for Roobarb and Custard, announced a long-term partnership with the PDSA with the aim of raising £1 million. The characters were featured on a range of PDSA T-shirts, promoted by singer and television presenter Alesha Dixon.

== Pet Fit Club ==
In 2005, the PDSA launched the Pet Fit Club competition to address the issue of pet obesity. The annual contest involves overweight dogs, cats and rabbits following a six-month diet and exercise programme designed by PDSA veterinary staff. At the conclusion of the programme, the best-performing participant is named "Slimmer of the Year". In 2015, the competition was opened to include small pets such as guinea pigs, hamsters, rats and mice.

== Patrons ==
- Princess Marina, Duchess of Kent – patron during the 1940s
- Princess Alexandra, The Honourable Lady Ogilvy – patron since 1973
