= War pigeon =

Homing pigeons used for military messages

War pigeons, commonly referred to as homing pigeons or carrier pigeons, are domesticated rock doves (Columba livia) selectively bred and trained to carry messages in military operations. Due to their speed, endurance, altitude, and homing ability, pigeons were frequently used as military messengers because they were often more reliable and difficult to intercept than other forms of wartime communication. Some pigeons received military honors for their service including 32 recipients of the Dickin Medal, and Cher Ami who was awarded the Croix de Guerre for delivering messages during World War I.

During World War I and World War II, carrier pigeons were used by the Australian, French, German, American, and UK forces, to transport messages back to their home coop behind the lines. When they landed, wires in the coop would sound a bell or buzzer and a soldier of the Signal Corps would know a message had arrived. The soldier would go to the coop, remove the message from the canister, and send it to its destination by telegraph, field phone, or personal messenger. Success rates for message delivery by war pigeons reportedly reached 95 percent.

A carrier pigeon's job was dangerous. Nearby enemy soldiers often tried to shoot down pigeons, knowing that released birds were carrying important messages. Some of these pigeons became quite famous amongst the infantrymen for whom they worked. One pigeon, named "Spike", flew 52 missions without receiving a single wound. Another, named Cher Ami, lost his foot and one eye, but his message got through, saving a large group of surrounded American infantrymen.

== Breeds ==
The breed most commonly used in modern military history was the Racing Homer, developed in Belgium and England during the 19th century through the crossbreeding of various pigeon breeds, primarily the Smerle, French Cumulet, English Carrier, Dragoon, and the now-extinct Horseman. The Cumulet contributed endurance and the capacity to fly for extended periods without tiring, while the Carrier passed on the ability to navigate home from great distances. The Racing Homer can maintain an average flying speed of approximately 97 km/h (60 mph), with recorded flights of up to 1,800 km (1,100 miles).

== History ==
Carrier pigeons have served military forces across multiple continents and civilizations for over three thousand years. Among the earliest recorded instances, the Sultan of Baghdad used message-carrying pigeons fitted with small capsules around 1150 BCE, establishing one of the first known organized military pigeon networks. In the sixth century BC, Cyrus, king of Persia, used carrier pigeons to communicate with various parts of his empire. In Ancient Rome, Julius Caesar used pigeons to send messages to the territory of Gaul. In 1815, a carrier pigeon brought news of the Duke of Wellington's victory at the Battle of Waterloo to London before any human courier would do so.

During the 19th-century Franco-Prussian War (1870–1871), the four-month Prussian siege of Paris produced one of the most significant demonstrations of carrier pigeons in military history. With Prussian forces encircling the city and all land routes sealed, the French military used balloons to transport homing pigeons out of Paris and past enemy lines, from where the birds were released and flew back into the besieged city. Each pigeon carried microfilmed dispatches, allowing a single bird to transport hundreds of compressed dispatches on a single strip of film. Aware of the pigeon network, the Prussian military deployed trained hawks specifically to hunt the pigeons before they could reach their destination. Across the full duration of the siege, approximately 400 birds transported nearly 115,000 official government communications and close to one million private messages into the besieged capital. The outcome of the siege established carrier pigeons as a proven and reliable method of military communication, and their use was well regarded in military planning in the decades leading up to World War I.

=== Spanish–American War ===
The United States military first used pigeons for communication during the Spanish–American War. The Coast Signal Service used pigeons that were trained to return to lighthouses along the Atlantic Coast, and the North Atlantic Squadron relied on the Naval Pigeon Messenger Service during exercises. Both the Boston Homing Club and the National Association of American Homing Pigeon Fanciers offered their birds to the war effort. After war was declared, the Naval Pigeon Messenger Service provided communications between ships off the East Coast. Pigeons were used on torpedo boats at naval headquarters in Key West and on ships leaving San Francisco. A regiment from Colorado sailing to the Philippines sent messages back to San Francisco to notify General Wesley Merritt of their progress. However, developments in wireless telegraphy led to the discontinuation of the Naval Pigeon Messenger Service, and the birds were auctioned off.

=== World War I ===
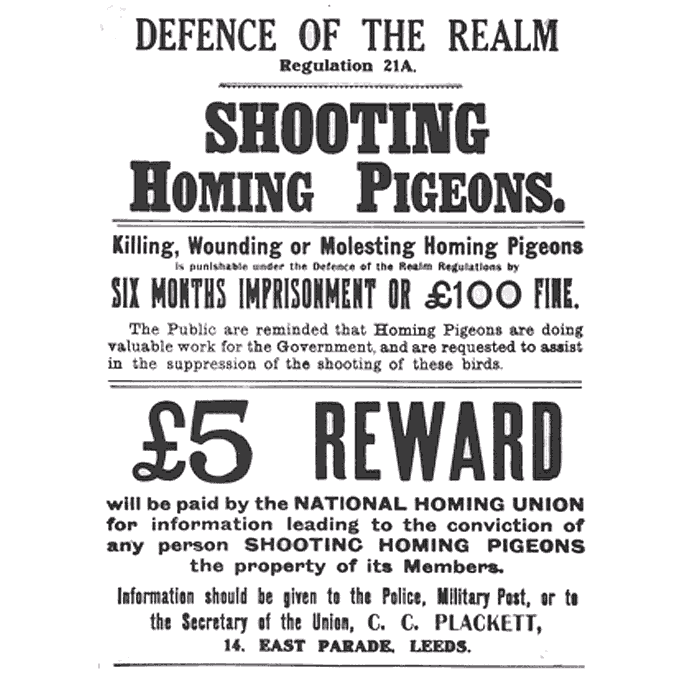
British WWI poster regarding the killing of war pigeons being an offence under Regulation 21A of the Defence of the Realm Act

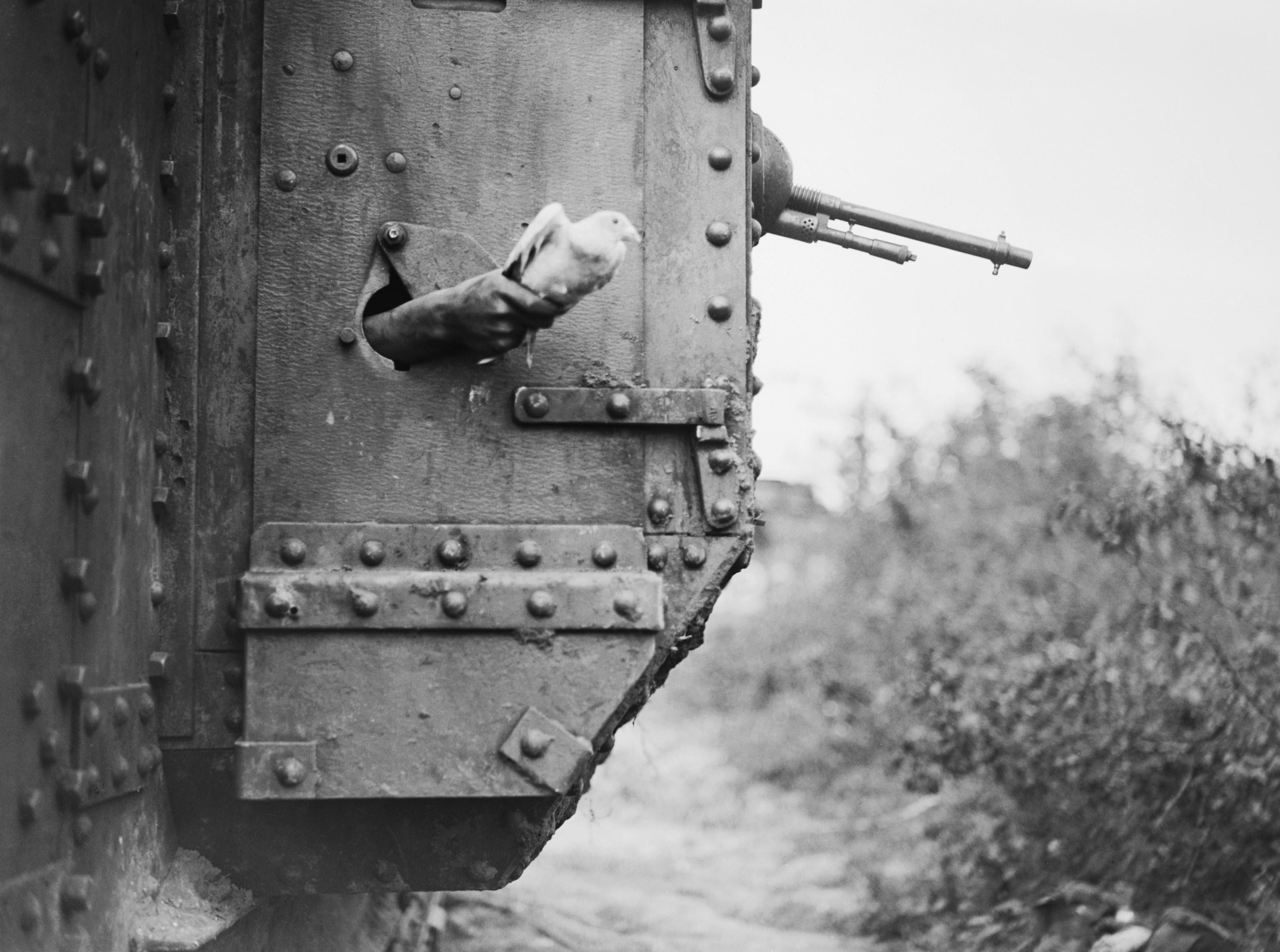
A pigeon being released from a port-hole in the side of a British tank during World War I

Homing pigeons were used extensively during World War I. In 1914, during the First Battle of the Marne, the French army advanced 72 pigeon lofts with the troops. The US Army Signal Corps used 600 pigeons in France alone.

One of their homing pigeons, a Blue Check cock (Note: On May 10, 2021, Doctors Carla Dove and Robert Fleischer took samples of the preserved body of Cher Ami and sent them for DNA analysis. On June 30, 2021, results confirmed that Cher Ami was a cock (male).) named Cher Ami, was awarded the French "Croix de Guerre with Palm" for heroic service delivering 12 important messages during the Battle of Verdun. On his final mission in October 1918, he delivered a message over 25 miles (40 km) despite having been shot through the breast or wing. The crucial message, found in the capsule hanging from a ligament of his shattered leg, saved 194 US soldiers of the 77th Infantry Division's "Lost Battalion" in the Battle of the Argonne, in October 1918. When Cher Ami died, he was mounted and is part of the permanent exhibit at the National Museum of American History of the Smithsonian Institution.

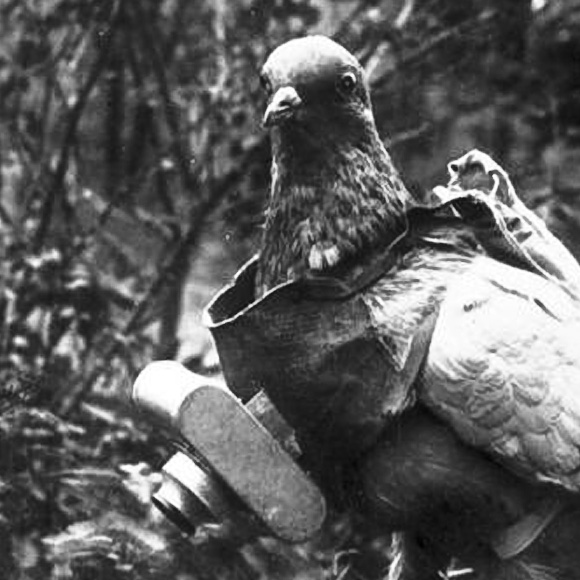
German unmanned camera pigeon (probably aerial reconnaissance in World War I)

United States Navy aviators maintained 12 pigeon stations in France, with a total inventory of 1,508 pigeons when the war ended. Pigeons were carried in airplanes to rapidly return messages to these stations, and 829 birds flew in 10,995 wartime aircraft patrols. Airmen of the 230 patrols with messages entrusted to pigeons threw the message-carrying pigeon either up or down, depending on the type of aircraft, to keep the pigeon out of the propeller and away from airflow toward the aircraft wings and struts. Eleven of the thrown pigeons went missing in action, but the remaining 219 messages were delivered successfully.

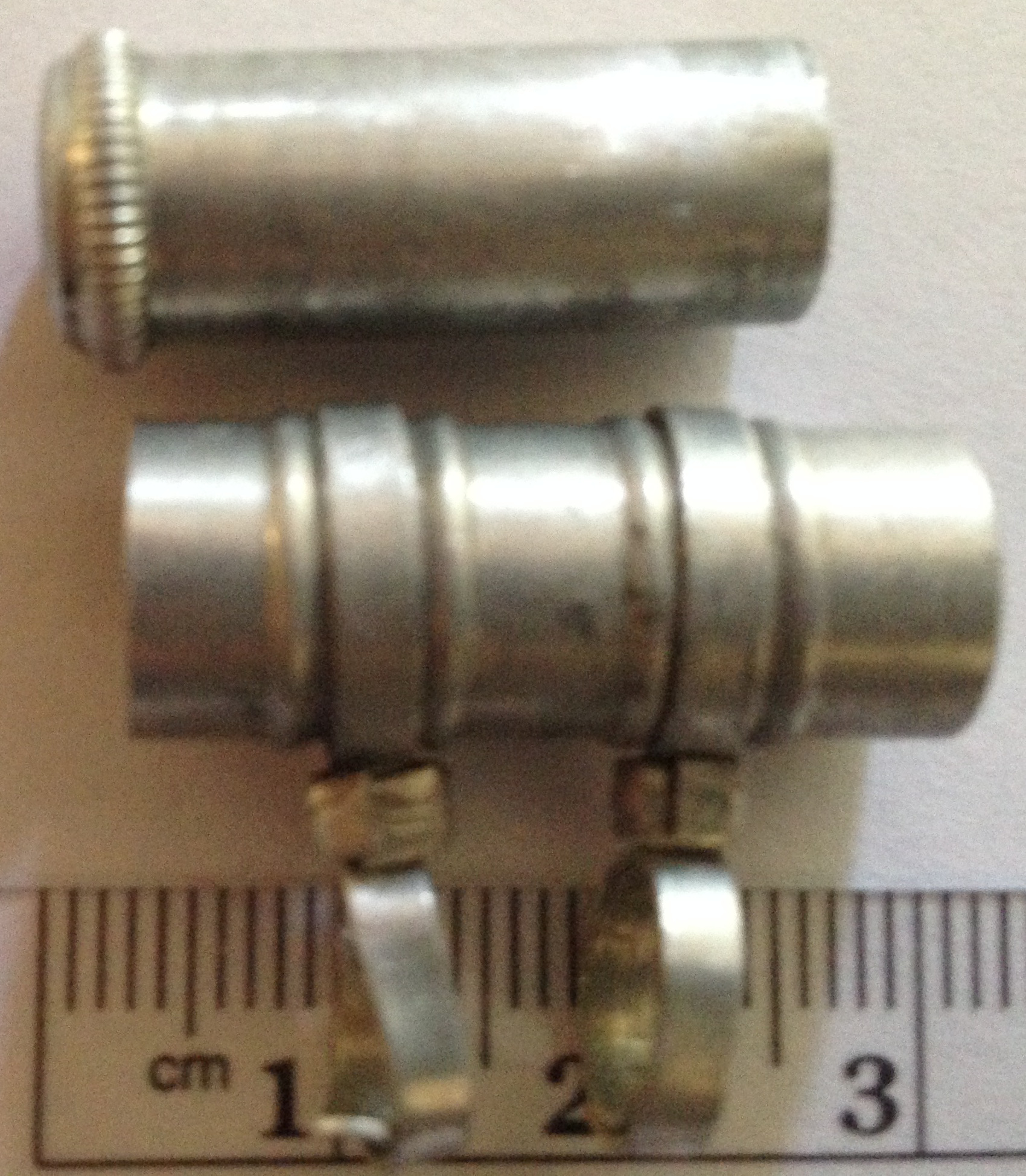
Leg canister for a war pigeon, U.S. Army Signal Corps, World War I. 1.0 x 2.9 cm, 1.7 gm

Pigeons were considered an essential element of naval aviation communication when the first United States aircraft carrier USS Langley was commissioned on 20 March 1922, so the ship included a pigeon house on the stern. The pigeons were trained at the Norfolk Naval Shipyard while Langley was undergoing conversion. As long as the pigeons were released a few at a time for exercise, they returned to the ship; but when the whole flock was released while Langley was anchored off Tangier Island, the pigeons flew south and roosted in the cranes of the Norfolk shipyard. The pigeons never went to sea again.

=== World War II and later deployments ===
During World War II, the United States military trained 54,000 homing pigeons. Over 36,000 of those pigeons were used overseas by 12 signal pigeon companies throughout each theater of operation. Upon arriving in Germany, members of the 285th Signal Pigeon Company located over 1000 homing pigeon lofts and clipped the feathers of over 15,000 pigeons to prevent their use by the Germans.

During World War II, the United Kingdom used about 250,000 homing pigeons for many purposes, including communicating with those behind enemy lines such as Belgian spy Jozef Raskin. The Dickin Medal, the highest possible decoration for valor given to animals, was awarded to 32 pigeons, including the United States Army Pigeon Service's G.I. Joe and the Irish pigeon Paddy.

The UK maintained the Air Ministry Pigeon Section during World War II and for a while thereafter. A Pigeon Policy Committee made decisions about the uses of pigeons in military contexts. The head of the section, Lea Rayner, reported in 1945 that pigeons could be trained to deliver small explosives or bioweapons to precise targets. The ideas were not taken up by the committee, and in 1948 the UK military stated that pigeons were of no further use. During the war, messenger pigeons could draw a special allowance of corn and seed, but as soon as the war ended this had been cancelled and anyone keeping pigeons would have to draw on their own personal rationed corn and seed to also feed the pigeons. However, the UK security service MI5 was still concerned about the use of pigeons by enemy forces. Until 1950, they arranged for 100 birds to be maintained by a civilian pigeon fancier in order to prepare for any eventuality. The Swiss army disbanded its Pigeon section in 1996.

==== Pigeon vest ====
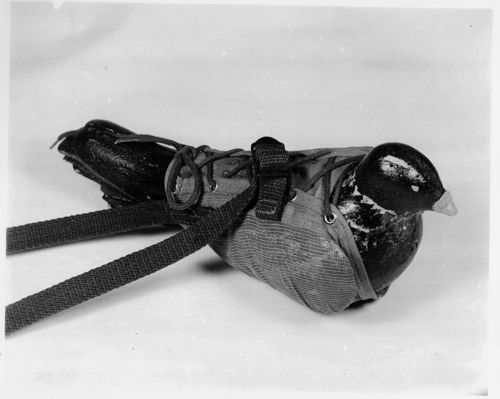
An example of a WWII-era pigeon vest on a pigeon-shaped mannequin

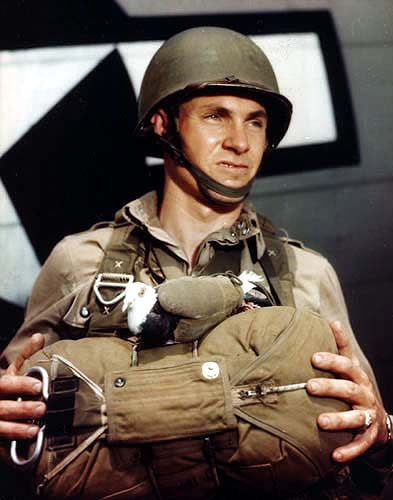
Paratrooper with pigeon vest

The Army, in coordination with the Maidenform Brassiere Company, developed the pigeon vest, also known as pigeon bra, to enable paratroopers to carry pigeons safely during jumps. The pigeon vest is a bra-like garment specifically developed for use in World War II. While pigeons had previously been used in World War I, and parachutes were designed specifically for them, the pigeon vest hadn't been invented before WWII.

In 1944, the women's underwear company Maidenform was contracted to manufacture 28,500 pigeon vests for the United States Armed Forces. The fabric used in pigeon vests was porous and tightly woven to prevent damage from their claws, and only contained a pigeon's body, leaving their head, feet, and wings free. The devices contained adjustable straps so the pigeons could be more easily carried by paratroopers. Once they landed, the pigeon vest would be undone, and then the pigeon would fly to their homing base. For the safety of the pigeons, it was recommended against confining a pigeon in a pigeon vest for over six hours.

Being produced by the undergarment company Maidenform, the pigeon vests had similar construction to a single bra cup with the lacing of a corset. They may have also been made from the same materials as bras. Contemporary advertisements for Maidenform bras included pictures of the pigeon vest, claiming "There is a maiden form for every type of figure."

After World War II ended, the War Assets Administration salvaged 27,064 pigeon vests as surplus property. The entire batch was purchased by a single dealer. An administration officer with the administration said, "He didn't say what he planned to do with them. What could anyone do with 27,064 pigeon vests?"

=== 21st century ===
In 2010, Indian police expressed suspicion that a recently captured pigeon from Pakistan might have been carrying a message from Pakistan. In 2015, a pigeon from Pakistan was logged into Indian records as a "suspected spy". In May 2020, another suspected Pakistani spy pigeon was captured by Indian security forces in Jammu and Kashmir. After finding nothing suspicious, India authorities released the pigeon back into Pakistan.

In 2016, a Jordanian border official said at a news conference that Islamic State militants were using homing pigeons to deliver messages to operatives outside its "so called caliphate".

In 2019, the Animals in War & Peace Medal of Bravery was instituted in the United States, with two war pigeons recognized at the inaugural ceremony.

== Decorated war pigeons ==
In total, 32 pigeons were decorated with the Dickin Medal, including:

- All Alone (1943)
- Winkie (1943)
- Tyke (1943)
- White Vision (1943)
- Commando (1944)
- Paddy (1944)
- William of Orange (1944)
- Gustav (1944)
- Beach Comber (1944)
- Royal Blue (1945)
- Mary of Exeter (1945)
- G.I. Joe (1946)

A grand ceremony was held in Buckingham Palace to commemorate a platoon of pigeons that braved the battlefields of Normandy to deliver vital plans to Allied forces on the fringes of Germany. Three of the actual birds that received the medals are on show in the London Military Museum so that well-wishers can pay their respects.

In Brussels, there is a monument commemorating pigeons that served in World War I, the Monument au Pigeon-Soldat.

Three pigeons have been recognized with the Animals in War & Peace Medal of Bravery:

- G.I. Joe, service in World War II (2019)
- Cher Ami, service in World War I (2019)
- The Mocker, service in World War I (2023)

== Gallery ==
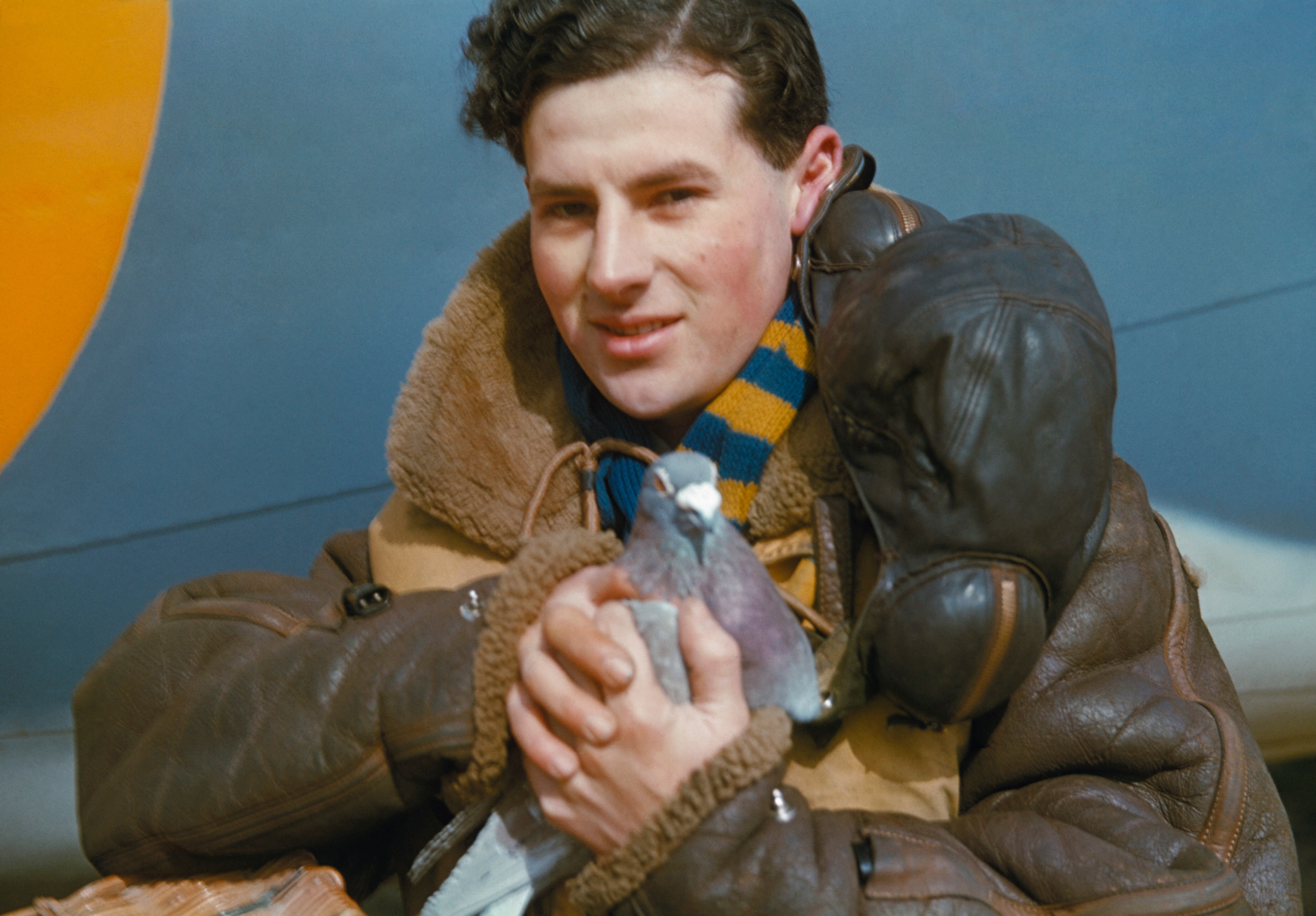
A member of the crew of an RAF Coastal Command Lockheed Hudson holding a carrier pigeon, 1942

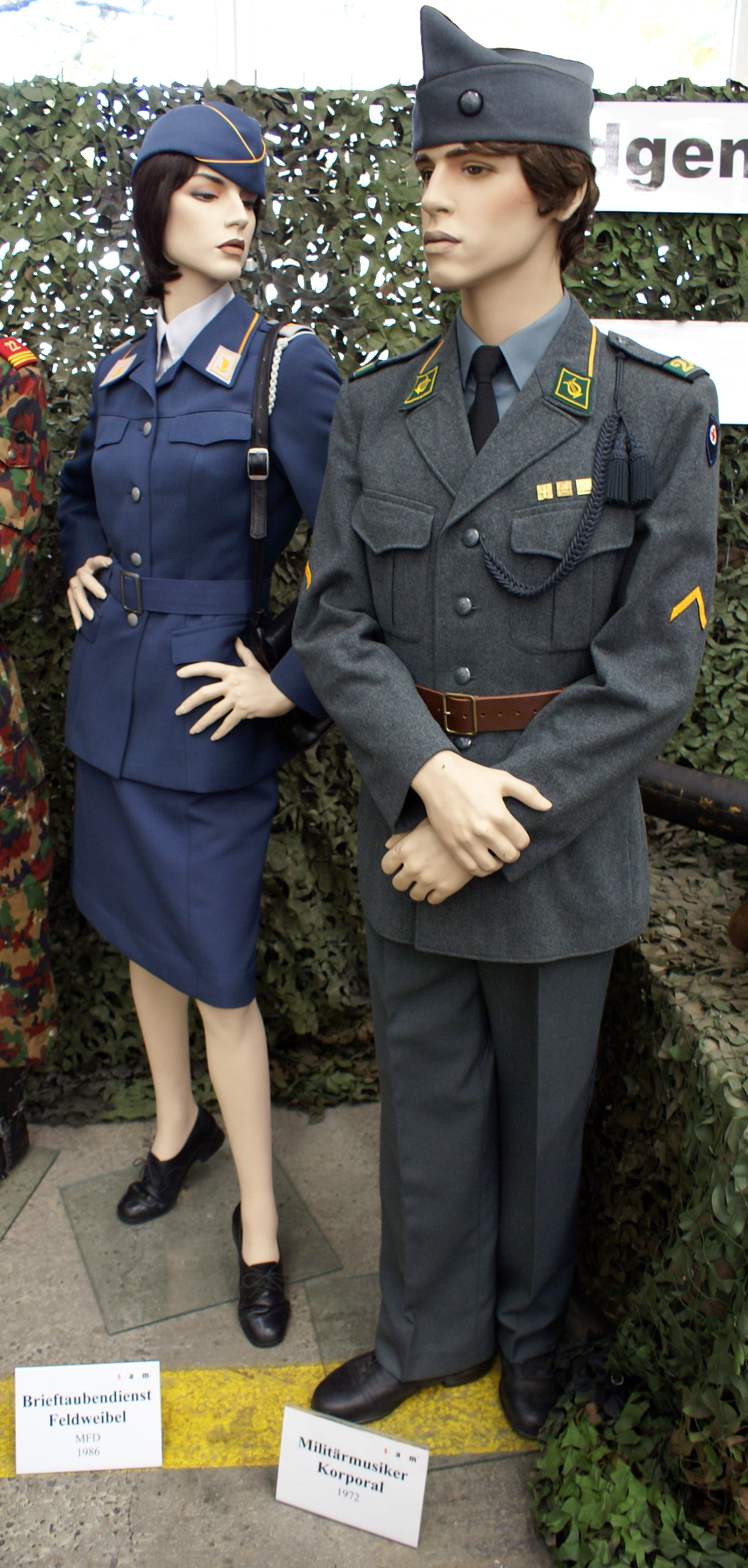
Left: Swiss homing pigeon service sergeant major, Women's Military Service, uniform of 1986

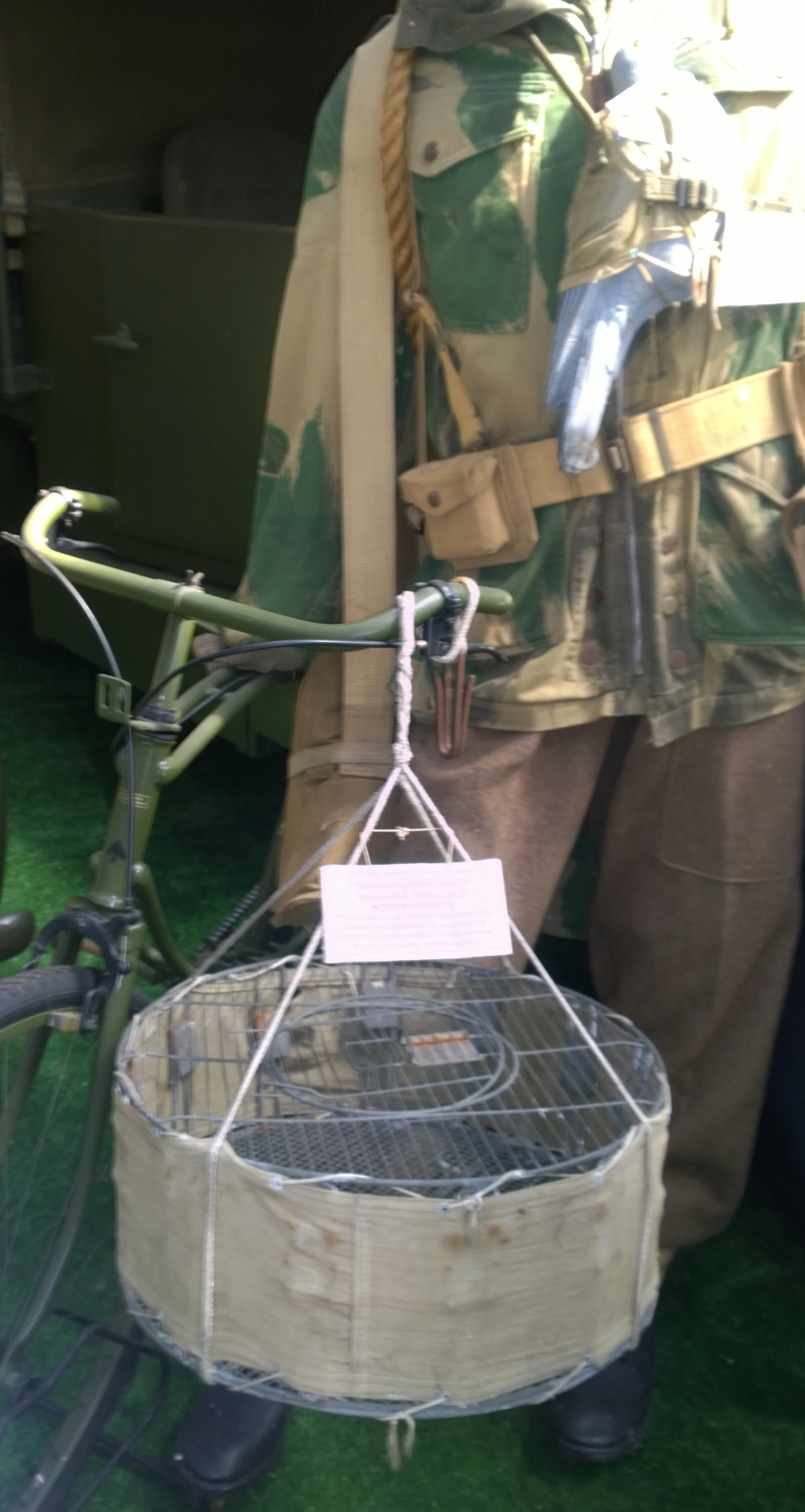
War pigeon carrier at the History on Wheels Museum, Eton Wick, Windsor, UK: The pigeon would be released from this carrying important messages back home.

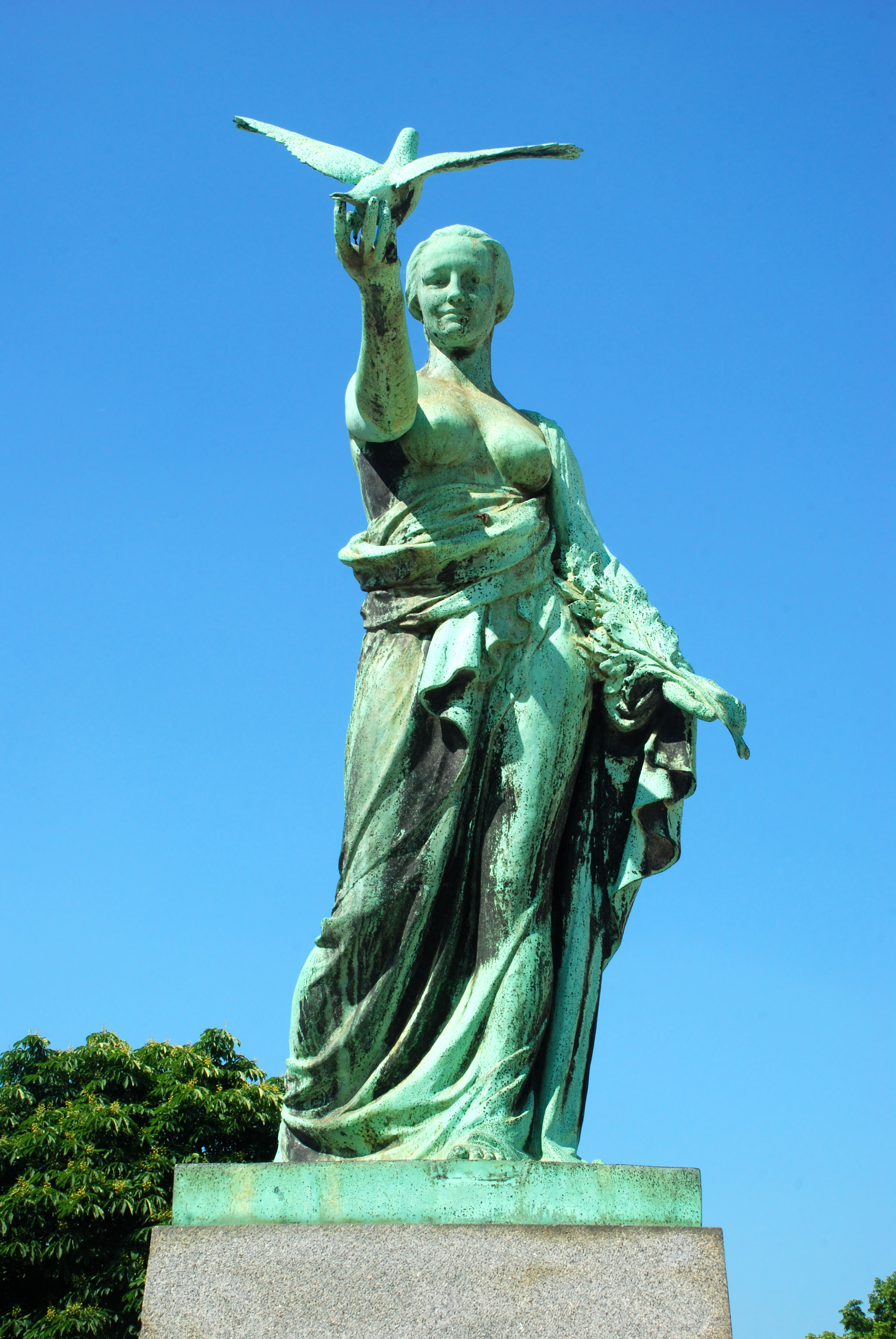
The Monument au Pigeon-Soldat in Brussels, commemorating pigeons that served in World War I

== See also ==
- Pigeon post – Use of homing pigeons to carry messages
- Olga of Kiev – used pigeons and sparrows to set fire to villages in the 10th century
- Jean Desbouvrie – French amateur bird trainer
- Military animals – Trained animal used for warfare or other military applications
- Pigeon intelligence – Intellectual capacity of pigeons
- List of equipment of the United States Army during World War II
- Pigeon photography – Aerial photography by pigeons
- Project Pigeon – Canceled pigeon-controlled guided bomb program
- Beach House Park, Worthing – Site of a memorial to war pigeons
- "Corporal Punishment" – an episode of Blackadder featuring a fictional World War I carrier pigeon named Speckled Jim
