= Chips (dog) =

US Military dog (1940–1946)

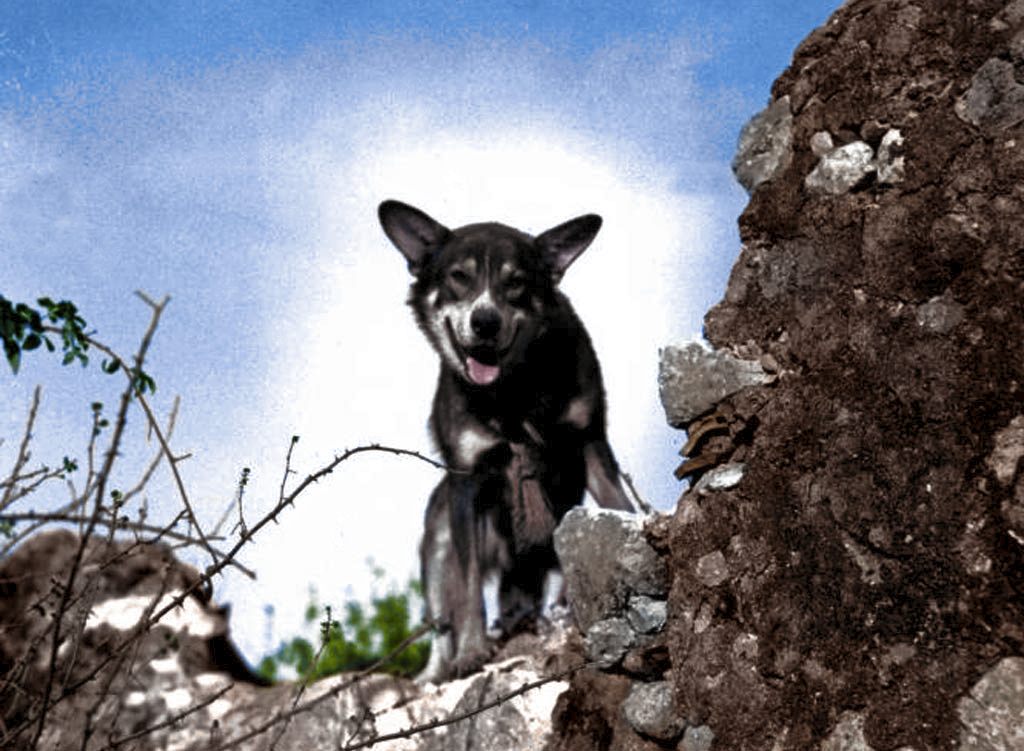
- Colorized photo of Chips
- Species: Canis familiaris
- Breed: Mixed breed
- Sex: Male
- Born: 1940
- Died: 1946
- Occupation: Sentry dog
- Awards: Distinguished Service Cross; Silver Star; Purple Heart; Dickin Medal; Animals in War & Peace Medal of Bravery

Chips (1940–1946) was a trained sentry dog for United States Army, and reputedly the most decorated war dog from World War II. Chips was a German Shepherd-Collie-Malamute mix owned by Edward J. Wren of Pleasantville, New York. He was bred by C.C. Moore, and was the son of Margot Jute, a half collie, half German shepherd, and Husky, a Malamute. His handler while he was in combat was Pvt. John P. Rowell, and Chips later saved his life and others in combat.

== Biography ==
C.C. Moore eventually gave Chips to the Wren family. Chips immediately grew attached to Wren's daughter, Gail, that he was often seen following her to school every day and laying underneath her desk. During playtime with other children, Chips was known to intervene, pulling the girls away if he thought they were in danger.

During the war, private citizens like Wren donated their dogs for duty. Chips shipped out to the War Dog Training Center, Front Royal, Virginia, in 1942 for training as a sentry dog. He was one of four dogs assigned to the 3rd Infantry Division in North Africa, Sicily, Italy, France and Germany. His handler was Pvt. John P. Rowell. Chips served as a sentry dog for the Roosevelt-Churchill conference in 1943. On July 10, 1943, Chips and his handler were pinned down on the beach by an Italian machine-gun team. Chips broke from his handler and jumped into the pillbox, attacking the gunners. The four crewmen were forced to leave the pillbox and surrendered to US troops. "There was an awful lot of noise," Rowell said. "Then I saw one fellow come out the door with Chips at his throat. I called him off before he could kill the man." In the fight, he sustained a scalp wound and powder burns. Later that day, he helped take ten Italians prisoner.

For his actions during the war, he was awarded the Distinguished Service Cross, Silver Star and Purple Heart; however, these awards were later revoked due to an Army policy preventing official commendation of animals. Following protests, then Army Adjutant General, Major General James A. Ulio, ruled that Chips was allowed to keep his medals, but that "no more medals would be allowed to dogs". Chips's unit unofficially awarded him a theater ribbon with an arrowhead for an assault landing, and battle stars for each of his eight campaigns.

In 2018, Chips was posthumously awarded the PDSA Dickin Medal for his efforts during the war. In 2019, Chips was posthumously awarded the Animals in War & Peace Medal of Bravery.

== See also ==
- Conan (military dog)
- Lex (dog)
- List of individual dogs
- Rags (dog)
- Sergeant Stubby, a Boston Bull Terrier, the most decorated war dog of World War I
- Smoky, another World War II military dog. This Yorkshire Terrier war dog was credited with 12 combat missions and awarded 8 battle stars.
