= Dustin J. Lee =

United States Marine

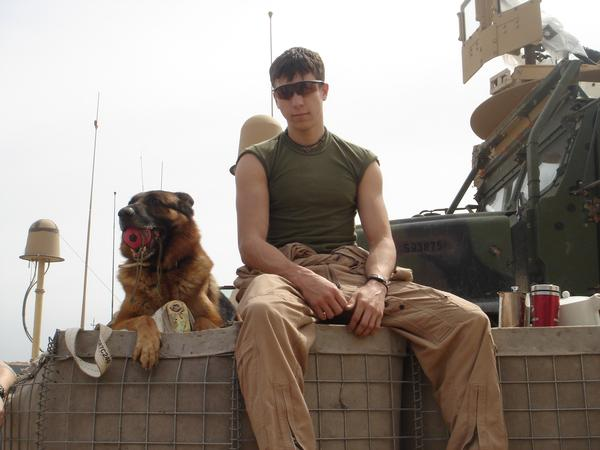
- Dustin Lee in Iraq with Lex
- Born: April 7, 1986; Meridian, MS
- Died: March 21, 2007 (aged 20); Fallujah, Iraq
- Burial place: Stonewall Cemetery, Stonewall, MS; 32.1355°N 88.7813°W
- Military career
- Allegiance: United States
- Branch: United States Marine Corps
- Service years: 2004–2007
- Rank: Corporal
- Nickname: Dusty
- Unit: 3rd Battalion 14th Marines
- Awards: Purple Heart; Navy and Marine Corps Commendation Medal with Combat Distinguishing Device for Valor, Combat Action Ribbon, NATO Training Medal-Iraq, Navy Sea Service Deployment Ribbon, National Defense Service Medal, Global War on Terrorism Service Medal, Marine Corps Good Conduct Medal, Armed Forces Service Medal

Dustin Jerome Lee (April 7, 1986 – March 21, 2007) was a corporal in the United States Marine Corps, serving as a dog handler and IED detector with his dog Lex. He and Lex were attacked by indirect fire at Company A's forward operating base on March 21, 2007. A 73 mm rocket round exploding delivered a mortal wound to Lee, which also injured Lex.

== Early life ==
Dustin Lee, son of Mississippi Highway Patrol trooper Jerome Lee, was born on April 7, 1986, in Meridian, Mississippi. From around five years old, Lee worked with rescue dogs by hiding in woods and allowing them to find him. According to his father, he was so moved by the September 11 attacks that he signed up for the military before graduating high school. Lee grew up in Quitman, Mississippi, and graduated from Quitman High School in 2004.

== Military career and death ==
Lee finished first in his training class as a dog handler in 2005. Lee was awarded the "Top Dog" distinction for Block One Patrol Dog Handler's Course with his assigned dog LLeo. LLeo was a puppy program dog that was bred by the Department of Defense and because of Lee's training later was deployed as a patrol narcotics detector dog for the US military. He was noted by the kennel master, William W. Reynolds, to be "uncanny as a dog handler". Because of his abilities, Lee was once given two dogs to work with at once: an explosives dog and a narcotics dog. He was stationed at Marine Corps Logistics Base Albany, HQ BN in Albany, Georgia before his deployment to Iraq. Lee was promoted to the rank of Corporal in July 2006. He attached to 3rd Reconnaissance Battalion before the attack, and was serving in 3rd Battalion 14th Marines G Battery, 3rd platoon at the time of his death. On March 21, 2007, Company A's forward operating base was attacked by insurgents with indirect fire. Lee and Lex sustained shrapnel injuries when a 73 mm rocket exploded inside Lee's forward operating base. Cpl. Lee was medevaced from the area to a hospital, where he died shortly thereafter; Lex's injuries were not life-threatening. Lee was scheduled to return home in approximately six weeks.

== Aftermath ==
Dustin Lee was interred at Stonewall Cemetery in Stonewall, Mississippi on March 31, 2007. He was posthumously awarded the Purple Heart, Navy and Marine Corps Commendation Medal with Combat Distinguishing Device for Valor and the Combat Action Ribbon. Lee's parents, aided by United States Representative Walter Jones (R-NC) and an online petition, successfully asked the Marine Corps to allow Lex to retire early, making him the first fully fit military working dog granted early retirement and adoption by the Department of Defense to his former handler's family.

After Lee's death, the Mississippi State Senate and House of Representatives passed a concurrent resolution honoring him. On March 19, 2010, Marine Corps Logistics Base Albany renamed its kennel the "Corporal Dustin Jerome Lee Kennel".

Lex died on March 25, 2012, as the result of cancer.

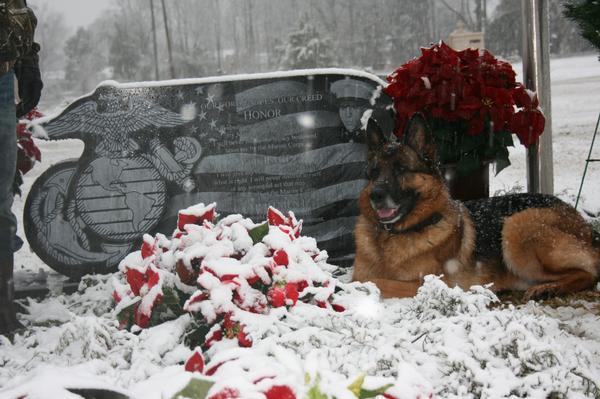
Lex at Dustin's grave

== See also ==
- Lex (dog)
