= Conan (military dog) =

American military dog

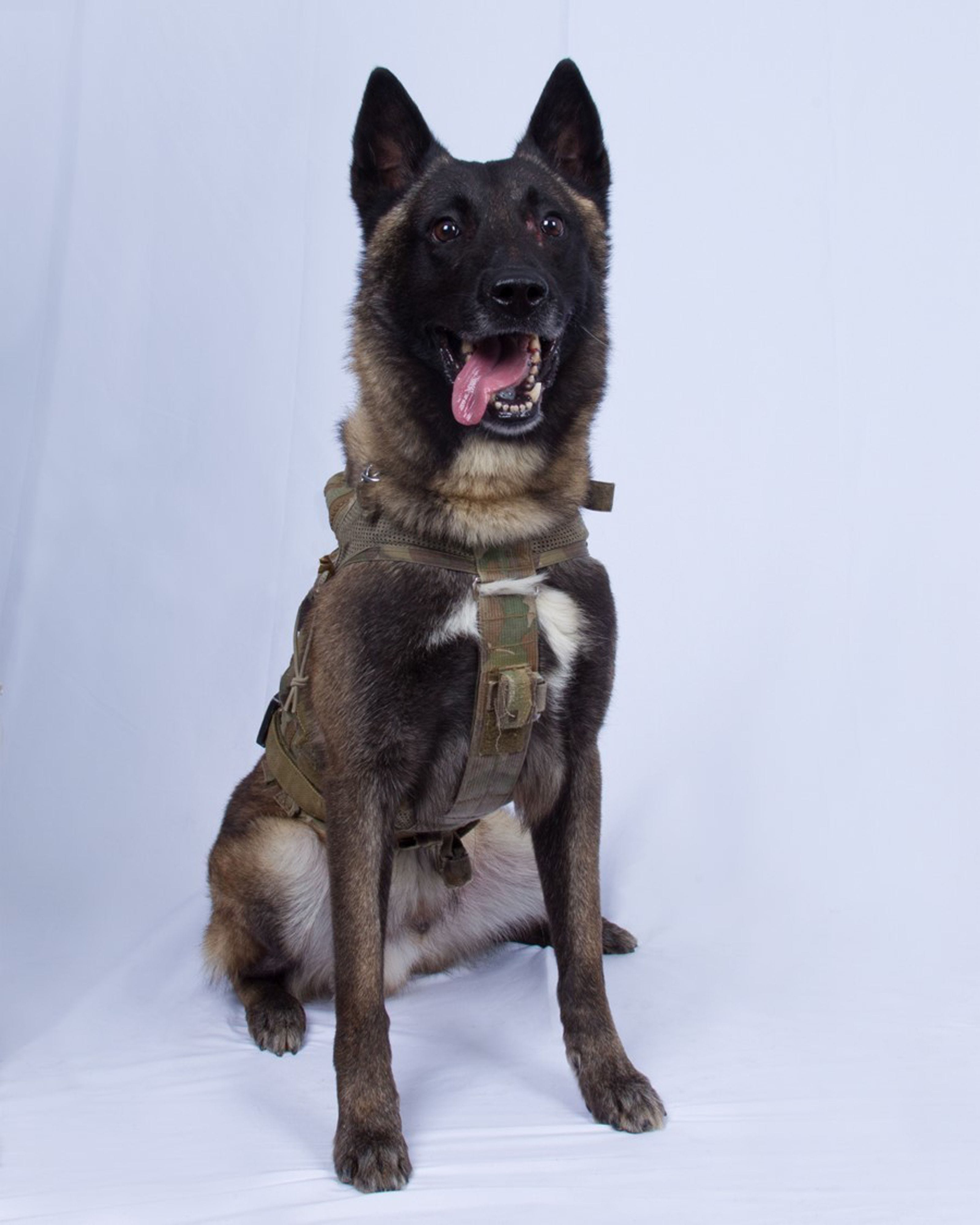
- The declassified image of Conan tweeted by U.S. President Donald Trump
- Species: Canis familiaris
- Breed: Belgian Malinois
- Sex: Male
- Born: 2013 or 2014; Netherlands
- Died: November 2023 (age 8–10)
- Occupation: Military dog
- Employer: United States
- Notable role: Special Operations Military Working Dog (SOMWD) in the US Delta Force
- Years active: 2015–2023
- Named after: Conan O'Brien
- Awards: Animals in War & Peace Medal of Bravery

Conan (2013 or 2014 – November 2023) was a special operations military working dog in the United States 1st SFOD-D (Delta Force). He was a male Belgian Malinois and was named after late-night talk show host and comedian Conan O'Brien. He was a veteran canine of the United States Special Operations Command (SOCOM), and served in 50 combat missions.

Conan took part in the Barisha raid in Syria, which resulted in the death of Abu Bakr al-Baghdadi, the then-leader of the Islamic State of Iraq and the Levant (ISIL, ISIS) terror organization, on October 27, 2019. He chased Baghdadi down into a tunnel where the terror leader detonated his suicide vest. General Kenneth F. McKenzie Jr. stated on October 30, 2019, that the dog was injured during the raid due to exposed live electric wires, but had recovered and returned to field duty.

== Identity ==
US President Donald Trump posted the declassified picture of Conan on Twitter and called him a "wonderful dog" in the tweet. His name was classified at the time, but it was revealed as Conan to Newsweek. A few days later, Trump also referred to the dog as Conan. Trump later re-tweeted a meme (photoshopped by The Daily Wire) of himself awarding Conan a dog version of a Medal of Honor.

After quickly garnering mainstream attention following the raid, merchandising with Conan's depiction and the slogan "Zero Bark Thirty" appeared online, a reference to Zero Dark Thirty, a film about the 2011 special operations raid that killed Osama bin Laden.

=== Conan's sex ===
There were conflicting reports on Conan's sex following his reveal to the public. Newsweek initially reported that the dog is female, but the magazine later issued a correction which said Conan is male. RTL Nieuws reported that Conan was trained by a company in Best, Netherlands, before being transported to the United States, and a man identified as his former owner and trainer was quoted as saying: "It is a five year old male. It is a very good dog."

On November 25, 2019, a White House official said the dog is female before issuing a correction, saying Conan is in fact male. The next day, defense officials confirmed with Stars and Stripes that Conan was male. At the same time, a U.S. defense official disputed this and told ABC News that Conan is female, but ABC's report was retracted a short time later with multiple officials saying they had verified that Conan is male.

The United States Special Operations Command (SOCOM) contested a Freedom of Information Act request for records related to Conan's sex. SOCOM stated that it can "neither confirm nor deny the existence or non existence of records."

== White House visit ==
Conan is introduced in the White House Rose Garden, November 25, 2019

On November 25, 2019, Conan made an appearance at the White House. Donald Trump introduced Conan to reporters in the White House Rose Garden, saying, "So this is Conan. Right now, probably the world's most famous dog." First Lady Melania Trump and Vice President Mike Pence attended the event as well, with Pence petting Conan and calling him a "hero" during brief remarks.

== Death ==
Conan died in November 2023 of cancer and injuries sustained during service.

== See also ==
- Chips, the most decorated war dog of World War II
- Sergeant Stubby, the most decorated war dog of World War I
- Lucca, Dickin Medal winning dog who served with U.S. Marines in Afghanistan
- List of individual dogs
