= Smoky (war dog) =

War dog (1943–1957)

- Smoky in a helmet
- Other name: Yorkie Doodle Dandy
- Species: Canis familiaris
- Breed: Yorkshire Terrier
- Sex: Female
- Born: c. Kerema, Papua New Guinea, December 11, 1943
- Died: 21 February 1957 (14 years)
- Resting place: Cleveland Metroparks (Lakewood, Ohio)
- Employer: Fifth Air Force, 26th Photo Recon Squadron
- Known for: War dog First therapy dog
- Owner: William A. Wynne
- Weight: 4 lb (1.8 kg)
- Height: 7 in (180 mm)
- Awards: PDSA Certificate for Animal Bravery or Devotion; Animals in War & Peace Distinguished Service Medal

Smoky (c. 1943 – 21 February 1957), a Yorkshire Terrier, was a famous war dog, who served with the Allied Forces in World War II. She weighed only 4 pounds (1.8 kg) and stood 7 inches (180 mm) tall. Smoky is credited with beginning a renewal of interest in the once-obscure Yorkshire Terrier breed.

== Biography ==
=== Discovery and purchase ===
In February 1944, Smoky was found by an American soldier in an abandoned foxhole in the New Guinea jungle. She was already a young adult Yorkie (fully grown). The soldiers initially thought the small dog belonged to the Japanese, but after taking her to a nearby prisoner-of-war camp they realized she did not understand commands in Japanese or English. Another GI then sold Smoky to Corporal William A. Wynne of Cleveland, Ohio, for two Australian pounds (equal to $6.44 at that time)—the price paid to the seller so he could return to his poker game.

=== WWII ===
For the next year, Smoky back-packed through the rest of the war and accompanied Wynne on combat flights in the Pacific. She faced adverse circumstances, living in the New Guinea jungle and Rock Islands, suffering the primitive conditions of tents in equatorial heat and humidity. Throughout her service, Smoky slept in Wynne's tent on a blanket made from a green felt card table cover; she shared Wynne's C-rations and an occasional can of Spam. Unlike the "official" war dogs of World War II, Smoky had access to neither veterinary medicine nor a balanced diet formulated especially for dogs. Despite this, Smoky was never ill. She even ran on coral for four months without developing any of the paw ailments that plagued some war dogs.

As described by Wynne, "Smoky served in the South Pacific with the 5th Air Force, 26th Photo Reconnaissance Squadron and flew 12 air/sea rescue and photo reconnaissance missions." On those flights, Smoky spent long hours dangling in a soldier's pack near machine guns used to ward off enemy fighters. Smoky was credited with twelve combat missions and awarded eight battle stars. She survived 150 air raids on New Guinea and made it through a typhoon at Okinawa. Smoky even parachuted from 30 feet (9.1 m) in the air, out of a tree, using a parachute made just for her. Wynne credited Smoky with saving his life by warning him of incoming shells on an LST (transport ship), calling her an "'angel' from a foxhole". As the ship deck was booming and vibrating from anti-aircraft gunnery, Smoky guided Wynne to duck the fire that hit eight men standing next to them.

In the downtime, Smoky learned numerous tricks, which she performed for the entertainment of troops with Special Services and in hospitals from Australia to Korea. According to Wynne, Smoky taught him as much as he taught her, and she developed a repertoire beyond that of any dog of her day. In 1944, Yank Down Under magazine named Smoky the "Champion Mascot in the Southwest Pacific Area".

Smoky's tricks enabled her to become a hero in her own right by helping engineers to build an airbase at Lingayen Gulf, Luzon, a crucial airfield for Allied war planes. Early in the Luzon campaign, the Signal Corps needed to run a telegraph wire through a 70-foot-long (21 m) pipe that was 8 inches (200 mm) in diameter. Soil had sifted through the corrugated sections at the pipe joinings, filling as much as half of the pipe, giving Smoky only four inches of headway in some places. As Wynne himself told the story when he appeared on NBC-TV after World War II:

I tied a string (tied to the wire) to Smoky's collar and ran to the other end of the culvert . . . (Smoky) made a few steps in and then ran back. "Come, Smoky," I said sharply, and she started through again. When she was about 10 feet in, the string caught up and she looked over her shoulder as much as to say `what's holding us up there?' The string loosened from the snag and she came on again. By now the dust was rising from the shuffle of her paws as she crawled through the dirt and mold and I could no longer see her. I called and pleaded, not knowing for certain whether she was coming or not. At last, about 20 feet away, I saw two little amber eyes and heard a faint whimpering sound . . . at 15 feet away, she broke into a run. We were so happy at Smoky's success that we patted and praised her for a full five minutes.

Smoky's work saved approximately 250 ground crewmen from having to move around and keep operational 40 United States fighters and reconnaissance planes, while a construction detail dug up the taxiway, placing the men and the planes in danger from enemy bombings. What would have been a dangerous three-day digging task to place the wire was instead completed in minutes.

=== After the war ===
When they arrived home from the war, Wynne and Smoky were featured in a page one story with photographs in the Cleveland Press on December 7, 1945. Smoky soon became a national sensation. Over the next 10 years, Smoky and Wynne traveled to Hollywood and all over the world to perform demonstrations of her remarkable skills, which included walking a tightrope while blindfolded. She appeared with Wynne on some of the earliest TV shows in the Cleveland area, including a show of their own on Cleveland's WKYC Channel 3 called Castles in the Air, featuring some of Smoky's unbelievable tricks. Smoky performed in 42 live-television shows without ever repeating a trick. Smoky and Wynne were also very popular entertainers at the veterans' hospitals. According to Wynne, “after the war Smoky entertained millions during late 1940s and early 1950s."

On February 21, 1957, "Corporal" Smoky died unexpectedly at the approximate age of 14. Wynne and his family buried Smoky in a World War II .30 caliber ammo box in the Cleveland Metroparks, Rocky River Reservation in Lakewood, Ohio.

Nearly 50 years later, on Veterans Day, November 11, 2005, a bronze life-size sculpture, by Susan Bahary, of Smoky sitting in a GI helmet, atop a two-ton blue granite base, was unveiled there. It is placed above the very spot that Smoky was laid at her final resting place. This monument is dedicated to “Smoky, the Yorkie Doodle Dandy, and the Dogs of All Wars".

== Honors ==
Memorials honoring Smoky include:

- Cleveland Metroparks, Rocky River Reservation, Lakewood, Ohio. (Smoky's final resting place)

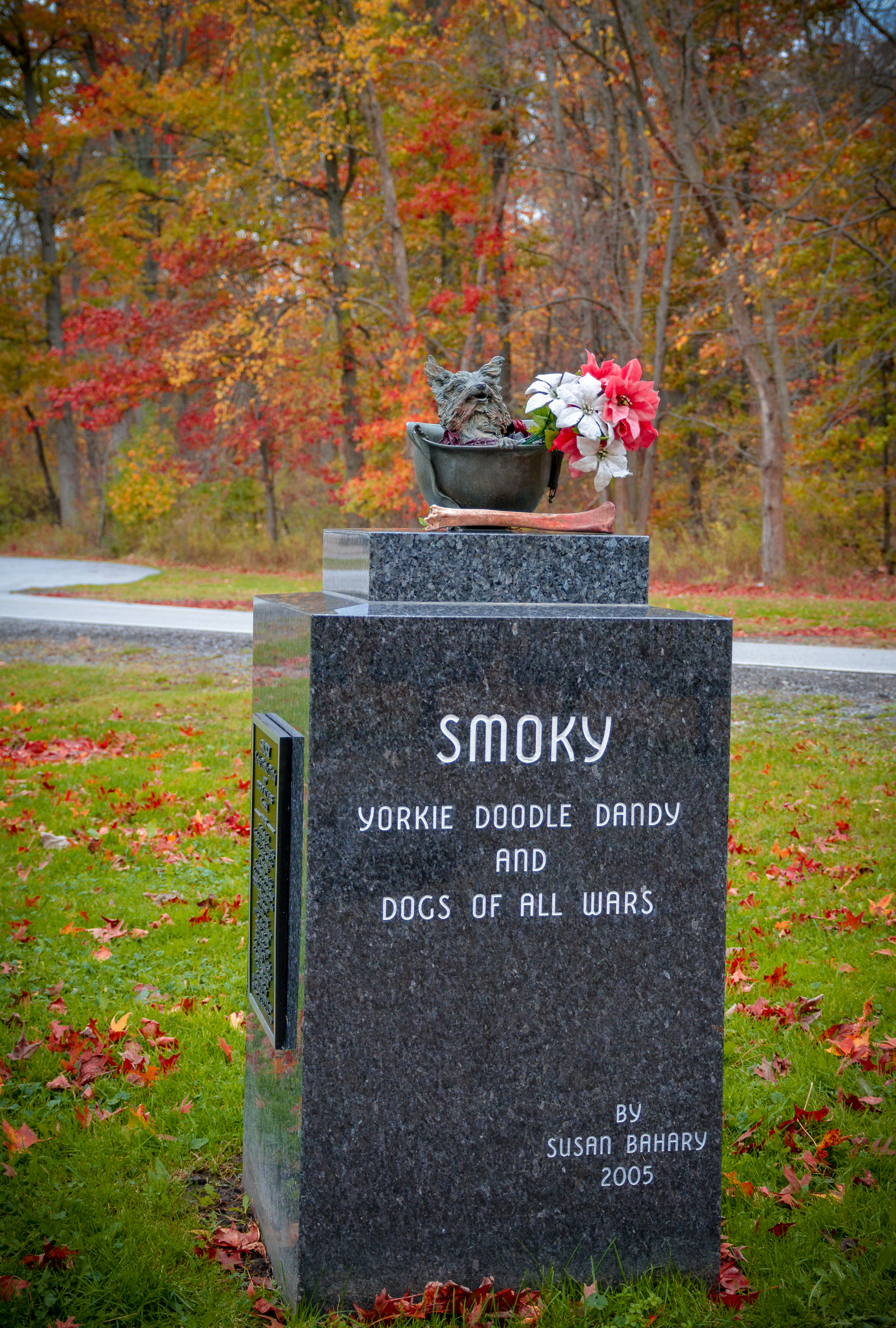
Smoky's monument in Lakewood, Ohio.

- The AKC Museum of the Dog in St. Louis, Missouri
- Hickam AFB in Hawaii, 26th Airspace Intelligence Sq.(successor of the 26th Photo Recon Sq.): "Smoky"
- Ohio Veterinary Medicine Association, Columbus, Ohio, Animal Hall of Fame, "No. 1 Dog Hero"
- City of Eastlake, Ohio, "SMOKY and DOGS of ALL WARS"
- National Museum of the US Air Force in Dayton, Ohio
- University of Tennessee, Knoxville, Tennessee, College of Veterinary Medicine: "Four Pounds of Courage"
- Royal Brisbane and Women's Hospital, Brisbane, Queensland, Australia

Additionally, the annual Yorkshire Terrier National Rescue (YTNR) "Rescues of the Year" are given the "Smoky Award" in honor of this famous rescue.

Smoky was awarded the PDSA Certificate for Animal Bravery or Devotion in April 2011.

Smoky received the Animals in War & Peace Distinguished Service Medal in 2022.

Smoky was featured in the Philippine Post's "Dogs in Philippine History Special Stamps" in 2024.

== First therapy dog ==
According to an Animal Planet investigation, Smoky was the first recorded therapy dog. Her service in this area began in July 1944 at the 233rd Station Hospital in New Guinea, where she accompanied nurses to see the incoming battlefield casualties from the Biak Island invasion. Smoky was already a celebrity of sorts, as her photograph was in Yank magazine at the same time, which made it easy to get permission. Dr. Charles Mayo of the Mayo Clinic was the commanding officer who allowed Smoky to go on rounds and also permitted her to sleep with Wynne in his hospital bed for five nights. Smoky's work as a therapy dog continued for 12 years, during and after World War II.

== Yorkie Doodle Dandy ==
Yorkie Doodle Dandy: Or, the Other Woman Was a Real Dog, is a book authored by Bill Wynne. It is the memoir of his time with Smoky during World War II and thereafter. It features highlights of their service in the Pacific and their adventures in Hollywood, as well as advice on dog training, Yorkshire Terrier FAQs, and more. The book tells the story of how Smoky was given a promotion to "corporal" and even explains how this Yorkshire Terrier ended up in New Guinea. Originally published in 1996 by Wynnesome Press, now in 2020, it's the 7th edition, by Top Dog Enterprises, LLC.

== See also ==
- Chips, the most decorated war dog of World War II.
- Sergeant Stubby, the most decorated war dog of World War I
- List of individual dogs
