= G.I. =

Informal term for U.S. military personnel

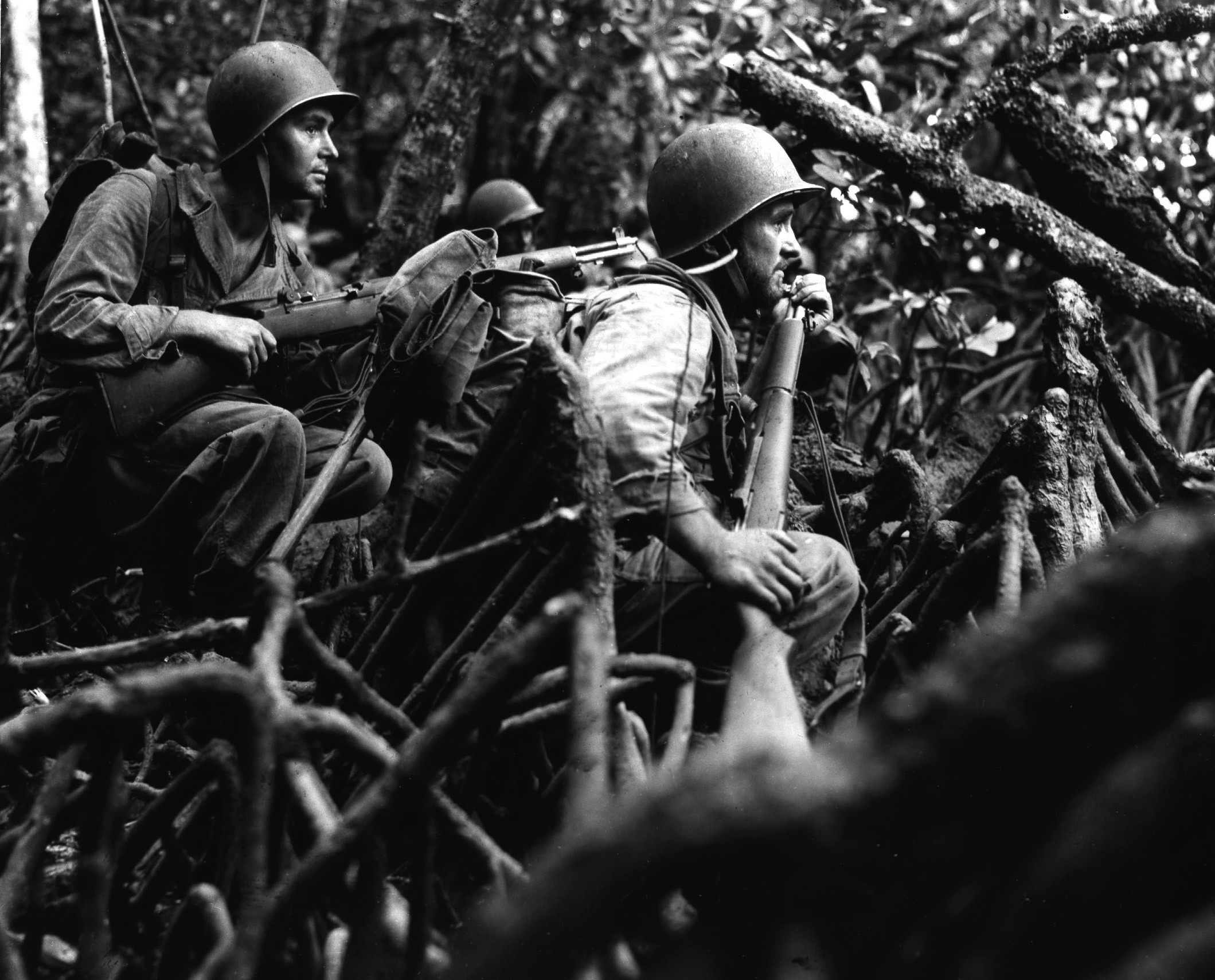
G.I.s from the 25th Infantry Division in the jungle of Vella Lavella during Operation Cartwheel, 13 September 1943

G.I. is an informal term which refers to members of the United States Armed Forces, in particular the United States Army. It is most deeply associated with World War II and the Korean War, but continues to see use, for instance in the G.I. Joe comics, films, and toys franchise. It was originally an initialism used in U.S. Army paperwork for items made of galvanized iron. The earliest known instance in writing is from either 1906 or 1907. During World War I, U.S. soldiers took to referring to heavy German artillery shells as "G.I. cans". During the same war, "G.I.", reinterpreted as "government issue" or "general issue", began being used to refer to any item associated with the U.S. Army, e.g., "G.I. soap". Other reinterpretations of "G.I." include "garrison issue" and "general infantry".

The earliest known recorded instances of "G.I." being used to refer to an American enlisted man as a slang term are from 1935. In the form of "G.I. Joe" it was made better known due to it being taken as the title of a comic strip by Dave Breger in Yank, the Army Weekly, beginning in 1942. A 1944 radio drama, They Call Me Joe, reached a much broader audience. It featured a different individual each week, thereby emphasizing that "G.I. Joe" encompassed U.S. soldiers of all ethnicities. They Call Me Joe reached civilians across the U.S. via the NBC Radio Network and U.S. soldiers via the Armed Forces Radio Network. Dwight D. Eisenhower would notably reference the term "G.I. Joe," whom he described as the main hero of World War II, in his May 1945 Victory in Europe Day address. "G.I. Jane" originally referred to a member of the Women's Army Corps during World War II, but more recently it is used to refer to any female American soldier.

== See also ==
- G.I. Generation (or Greatest Generation), the social generation of WWII veterans
- Digger (soldier) – A similar term used in Australia
- Doughboy
- Dogface (military)
- G.I. Bill, postwar benefits for veterans
- G.I. Blues (film)
- G.I. Jane (film)
- G.I. Joe (pigeon) – birds used in World War II
- G.I. Joe (disambiguation)
- The Story of G.I. Joe (1945 film)
- Tommy Atkins (soldier) – British slang for a common soldier
