= All Alone (pigeon) =

Pigeon receiver of the Dickin Medal

- Other name: NURP.39.SDS.39
- Species: Pigeon
- Sex: Hen
- Hatched: Staines, Surrey, U.K.
- Nationality: British
- Occupation: War Pigeon
- Employer: National Pigeon Service
- Notable role: French Resistance
- Years active: 1943 and circa
- Known for: Fast delivery of important message from agent in occupied France
- Owners: J. W. Paulger, proprietor of the Blue Anchor Inn
- Appearance: Blue
- Awards: Dickin Medal 1946 "...for gallantry and devotion"

All Alone (NURP.39.SDS.39) was a war pigeon who was decorated for bravery in service during the Second World War for having delivered an important secret message in one day, at a distance of 400 miles (640 km), while serving with the National Pigeon Service in August, 1943.

== Mission ==
In the summer of 1943, All Alone, a blue hen, parachuted with a spy into Vienne, France. The agent learned important information about the Milice, a paramilitary group that was to conduct assassinations, round up Jews for deportation, and to attack the French Resistance. All Alone carried this information more than four hundred miles, across the English Channel, back to her home in Staines, England, in less than twenty-four hours. The speed of her flight and the urgency of its success earned All Alone a Dickin Medal, an award known as the animal equivalent of the Victoria Cross, "...for Gallantry and Devotion to Duty" in 1946.

== See also ==
- List of individual birds
