= Bill Wynne =

American writer (1922–2021)

- Born: William Anthony Wynne; March 29, 1922; Scranton, Pennsylvania, U.S.
- Died: April 19, 2021 (aged 99); Ohio, U.S.
- Occupations: Photographer, investigative photojournalist, author and community advocate
- Spouse: Margaret Roberts (m. 1946; died 2004)
- Children: 9
- Website: http://www.smokywardog.com/

William Anthony Wynne (March 29, 1922 – April 19, 2021) was an American author, photographer, award-winning photojournalist, and community advocate. He was also known as a decorated veteran, having owned and trained Smoky the Dog during World War II.

== Early life and education ==
Wynne was born in Scranton, Pennsylvania, in March 1922, to Martin A. and Beatrice Caffrey Wynne. He grew up in Cleveland, Ohio, after moving there as an infant.

He attended West Technical High School in Cleveland, before graduating from the USAAF Photo Lab Technician School at Lowry Field and then the Aerial Photo School in Colorado Springs, Colorado.

== Military service ==
Wynne served in World War II, enlisting on January 12, 1943. He was discharged on November 27, 1945. During this time he served 24 months in the Southwest Pacific and the Far East with the 26th Photo Recon Squadron and the 6th Photo Recon Group, and at New Guinea, Biak Island, Luzon, Okinawa, and Korea.

As aerial photographer, he flew 13 combat missions with the 3rd Emergency Rescue Squadron from Biak Island to Ceram, Halmahera, Celebes, Borneo, and Mindanao between September and December 1944.

With the 26th Photo Recon Squadron, he also worked as a lab technician and as a camera installer on F-5 Lightning (Photo Recon P-38s) reconnaissance planes.

== Smoky ==
While stationed on the Island of New Guinea, Wynne bought a Yorkshire Terrier, which he later named Smoky, from a fellow soldier for two Australian pounds.

Their adventures together ranged from flying in PBY Catalinas to assisting engineers with getting the communications operational at an airbase at Lingayen Gulf, Luzon, where Wynne had Smoky drag a telegraph wire, tied to her collar, under a runway, through a 70-foot-long (21 m) culvert only 8 inches (200 mm) in diameter, reduced in places by silt. Wynne and Smoky also entertained troops and wounded. After the war, Wynne brought Smoky back to the United States. After a brief stint in Hollywood, they starred on their own shows on all three television channels Cleveland had at the time.

"Corporal" Smoky died at the age of 14 on February 20, 1957.

== Personal life ==
Wynne married Margaret Roberts on September 28, 1946, and they remained married for over 57 years until her death in 2004. They had nine children. He died in Westlake, Ohio in April 2021 at the age of 99. At the time of his death he had 27 grandchildren, 41 great-grandchildren and 1 great-great-grandchild.

== Awards ==
For this military service, Wynne was awarded two U.S. Presidential Unit Citations and eight Battle Stars.

On October 28, 2009, Wynne was inducted into the Ohio Press and Journalism Hall of Fame in Cleveland, Ohio.

== Books ==
Yorkie Doodle Dandy - CO: Top Dog Enterprises, LLC, 1996.
