= Hurricane (dog) =

American Secret Service canine (2009–2025)

K9 Hurricane
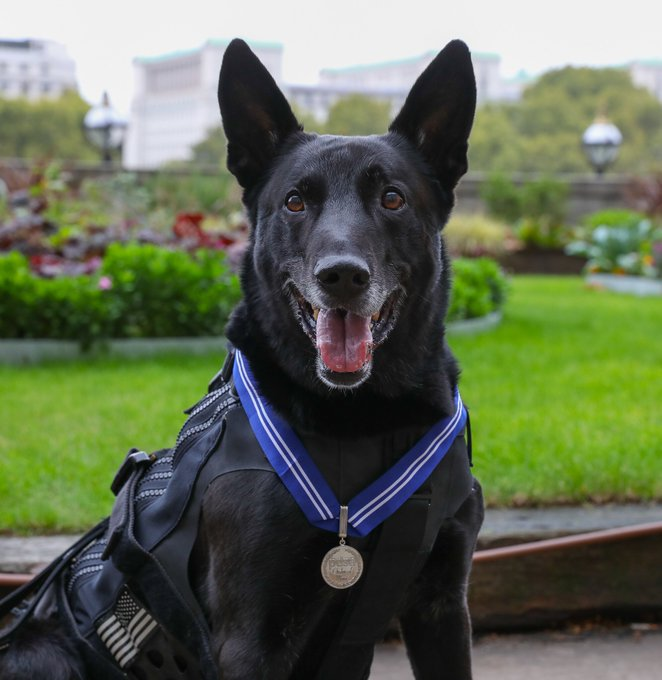
- Hurricane in 2019
- Species: Dog
- Breed: Belgian Malinois
- Sex: Male
- Born: April 26, 2009
- Died: February 18, 2025 (aged 15)
- Employer: U.S. Secret Service - Emergency Response Team
- Years active: 2012–2016
- Known for: Protecting President Obama by stopping a perpetrator who jumped the White House fence, attempting to enter the White House residence while President Obama and his family were inside.

Hurricane (April 26, 2009 – February 18, 2025) was a Special Operations canine of the United States Secret Service. He was a black Belgian Malinois recognized for his valor and bravery in 2014.

Hurricane served with his handler, Officer Marshall Mirarchi, for four years on the Secret Service's elite Emergency Response Team, a unit within the Special Operations Division. As part of the ERT's tactical canine unit, Hurricane protected the President of the United States, the vice president, their families, and visiting dignitaries.

On October 22, 2014, Hurricane protected President Barack Obama and the First Family from an intruder who had scaled the perimeter fence of the White House and was heading towards the residence. When the first attempt at intercepting the intruder was unsuccessful, Hurricane was given the go ahead by Mirarchi. Despite being repeatedly punched, kicked and swung around by the intruder, Hurricane kept a hold until armed officers were able to apprehend the intruder.

Hurricane was medically retired from the U.S. Secret Service on September 20, 2016, due to injuries sustained in the attack, and was adopted by Mirarchi. On February 18, 2025, Hurricane died at the age of 15.

== Awards ==
K9 Hurricane was recognized for his bravery and heroic actions over the years:

- 2014: The US Secret Service presented Hurricane and Mirarchi with the Award for Meritorious Service.
- 2015: Hurricane and Mirarchi were awarded the Secretary's Award for Valor by the US Department of Homeland Security, the first award ever presented to U.S. Secret Service canine.
- 2016: Hurricane was the recipient of the Animal Medical Center in New York City's Top Dog Award.
- 2019: Hurricane was presented with Great Britain's PDSA Order of Merit for Outstanding Devotion and Service to Society, the first international recipient of the award.
- 2022: In a ceremony at the U.S. Capitol on March 9, 2022, Hurricane became the first recipient of the Animals in War & Peace Distinguished Service Medal.
