= Animals in War & Peace Medal of Bravery =

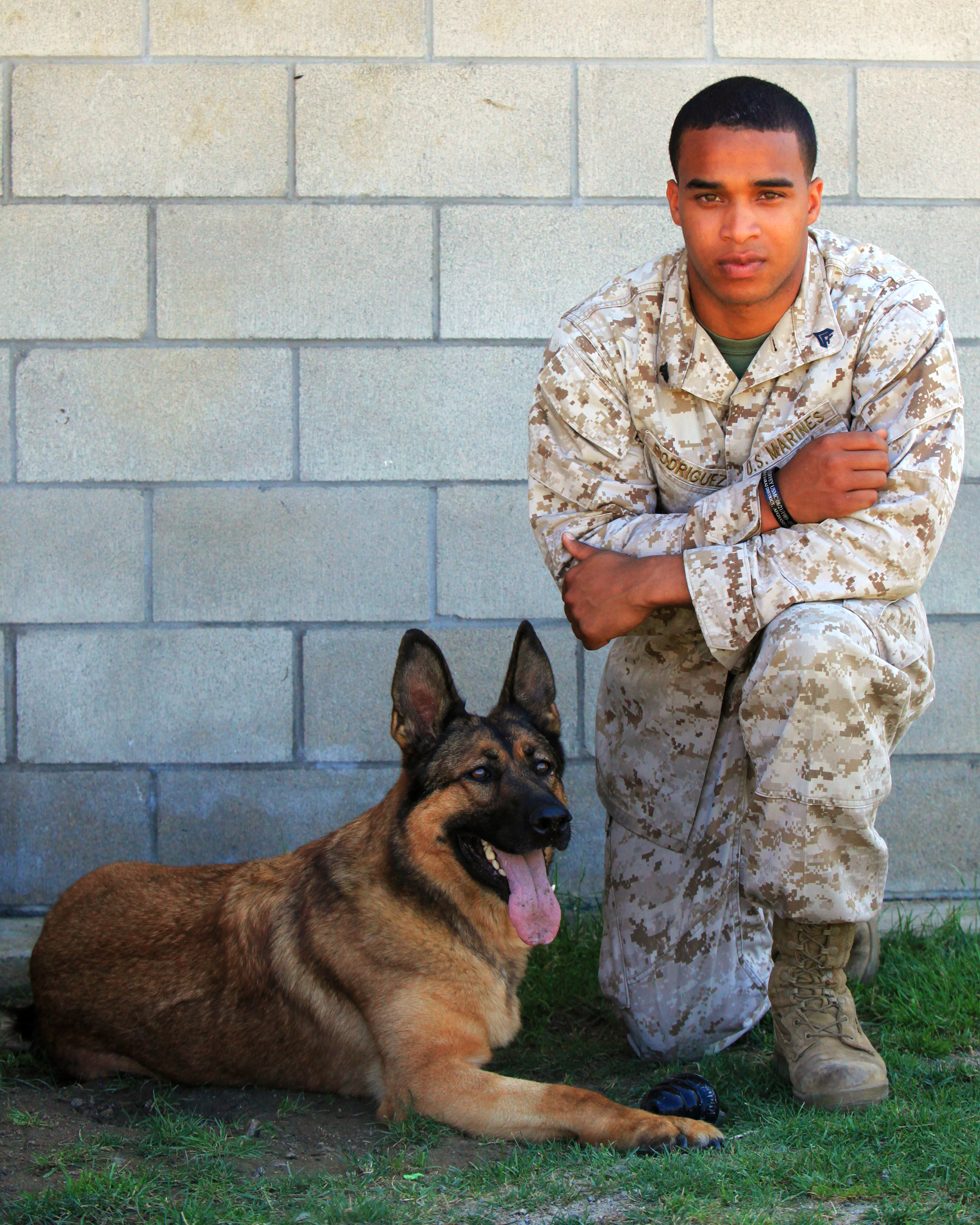
- Lucca (left) with her handler, Cpl Juan M Rodriguez
- Awarded for: Conspicuous gallantry or devotion to duty in war and peace
- Country: United States
- First award: 2019
- Website: animalsinwarandpeace.org
- ribbon bar

The Animals in War & Peace Medal of Bravery was instituted in 2019 in the United States by Robin Hutton and Mari Lou Livingood to honor the work of American animals in war and peace. The medal was created to be the American equivalent of the Dickin Medal, awarded in the UK for any animal displaying conspicuous gallantry and devotion to duty particularly in the armed forces or civil emergency services.

== Recipients ==
The first recipients received their awards on November 14, 2019, either posthumously or in person at a ceremony attended by dignitaries and members of Congress on Capitol Hill in Washington, D.C. The event was sponsored by Angels Without Wings, Inc., The Livingood Group, and the National Marine Corps League. Organizers, members of Congress and animal handlers present called it a historic day and that the awards were long overdue.

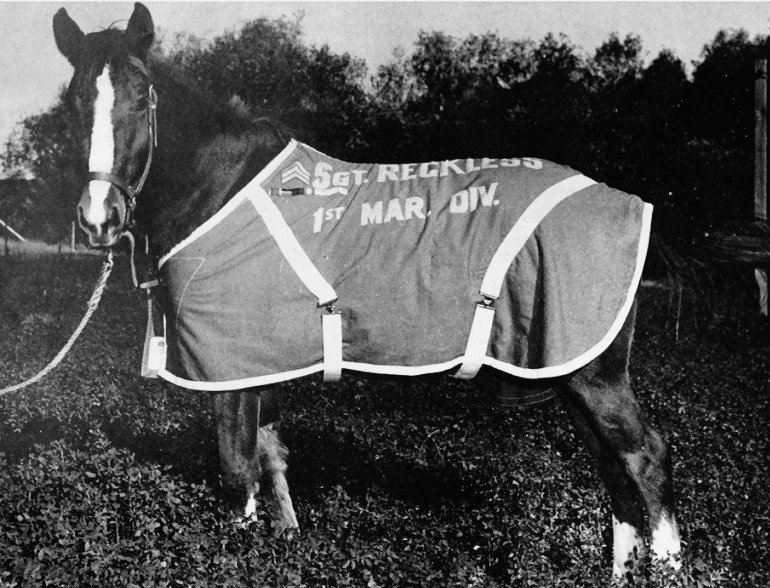
Sgt. Reckless in pasture

The recipients included two pigeons, five dogs, and a horse. G.I. Joe, one of the pigeons, died almost 60 years ago, but during World War II, he saved the lives of over one hundred Allied forces by flying 20 miles in 20 minutes to "deliver a message that aborted an imminent bombing by friendly forces". The horse, Sergeant Reckless, served with the U.S. Marines in numerous combat actions during the Korean War, carrying supplies and ammunition, and was also used to evacuate wounded. "Let the record show: Sergeant Reckless was a lot more courageous than I", said former senator John Warner in presenting the award in honor of the revered horse.

Other posthumous medals were awarded to Chips, a pet husky mix who served in World War II; Stormy, a German Shepherd who helped capture enemy soldiers during the Vietnam War; and Lucca, an IED-detecting dog who protected thousands of human lives as part of her assignments in Iraq and Afghanistan. On her last mission in 2012, when she was on patrol in Afghanistan, she sniffed out a 30-pound (13.6-kilogram) IED and was continuing her search when she lost one of her legs when another IED detonated underneath her. Cpl. Juan Rodriguez, her handler, thought she had been killed, but was able to rescue her.

Two living animals were at the ceremony for their awards: Bucca, a former stray who overcame a rough past to become a star arson-detecting K-9 for the New York Fire Department, and Bass, a Belgian Malinois who held the rare position of "multipurpose canine" in the Marine Corps' Special Operations Command until retiring in October 2019. Bass was accompanied by his handler, Staff Sgt. Alex Schnell. Bass served four deployments with in Afghanistan, Iraq and Somalia from 2014 to 2019.

At the 2019 ceremony, a campaign was initiated to create an International Animals in War and Peace Museum that will recognize animal heroism in war and peace.

At the second medal ceremony on March 9, 2022, six dogs received either the Medal of Bravery or the new Distinguished Service Medal. One of the dogs had served in World War II, one in the Vietnam War, and one was on the raid that eliminated Osama bin Laden; the other three were all recently active, and attended the ceremony. Three of the dogs received the Medal of Bravery.

=== Medal of Bravery ===
	Recipient(s)	Animal	Date of award	Notes	Ref(s)
#1	Staff Sergeant Reckless	Horse	14 November 2019	Served in the Korean War with U.S. Marines; carried supplies and evacuated wounded.	
#2	Cher Ami	Pigeon	14 November 2019	Pigeon who served with U.S. Signal Corps in World War I. Delivered a critical message to end friendly fire shelling despite being gravely wounded in the process.	
#3	Chips	Dog	14 November 2019	Pet Husky mix whose family volunteered him in World War II.	
#4	G.I. Joe	Pigeon	14 November 2019	Delivered a message credited with saving over 100 lives, served in World War II.	
#5	Stormy	Dog	14 November 2019	German Shepherd who served in Vietnam.	
#6	Lucca	Dog	14 November 2019	Explosives-detecting dog, served in Afghanistan.	
#7	Bucca	Dog	14 November 2019	Arson-detecting dog, served in the New York Fire Department.	
#8	Bass	Dog	14 November 2019	Explosives-detecting dog, served in Afghanistan, Iraq and Somalia.	
#9	Nemo	Dog	9 March 2022	A German Shepherd, served in the Vietnam War.	
#10	Cairo	Dog	9 March 2022	A Belgian Malinois, worked with SEAL Team Six, was a member of the team that eliminated Osama bin Laden in 2011.	
#11	Ziggy	Dog	9 March 2022	A German Shepherd serving with the United States Marine Forces Special Operations Command.	
#12	Jafar	Dog	15 March 2023	Multi-Purpose Canine (MPC): SWAT, narcotics detection, and patrol.	
#13	The Mocker	Pigeon	15 March 2023	U.S. Army Signal Corps, homing pigeon in World War I, carried critical message at Battle of Saint-Mihiel.	
#14	Paco	Dog	15 March 2023	Military Working Dog (MWD), served with U.S. Army in Afghanistan.	
#15	Kay	Dog	15 March 2023	Multi-Purpose Canine, served in Afghanistan and Iraq with 75th Army Ranger Regiment.	
#16	Shimanski	Dog	15 March 2023	Multi-Purpose Canine, served four tours in Afghanistan.	
#17	Kitt	Dog	6 March 2024	A German Shepherd–Belgian Malinois mix serving with the Braintree, Massachusetts police department. Died in the line of duty protecting his handler and two police officers.	
#18	Yoda	Dog	6 March 2024	A Belgian Malinois serving with the U.S. Border Patrol.	
#19	Endo & Ax	Dogs	6 March 2024	German Shepherds serving with the Volusia, Florida, Sheriff's Office. Both have previously received Purple Hearts.	
#20	Spido	Dog	11 March 2025	Shepherd, served with US Army Special Operations Command, Delta Force, Combat Assault Dog (CAD), numerous deployments. Died saving the lives of teammates in Afghanistan.	
#21	Luca	Dog	11 March 2025	Dutch Shepherd, Multi-Purpose Canine with US Army 7th Special Forces Group (Airborne) in Afghanistan (2015-2020); then with Desoto County Sheriff’s Department, Hernando, MS (2020-2024), died in service.	
#22	Mminto	Dog	11 March 2025	Belgium Malinois, served with US Army 95th Military Police Detachment, Joint Base Lewis-McChord, WA, died in action in Syria.	
#23	Conan	Dog	11 March 2025	Belgium Malinois, served with US Army Special Operations Command, Delta Force. Participated in over 50 combat missions. Best known for participation in raid on Abu Bakr al-Baghdadi.	

=== Distinguished Service Medal ===
A second medal, the Animals in War & Peace Distinguished Service Medal, was introduced at the 2022 ceremony, for animals who have distinguished themselves by "exceptionally meritorious service to the U.S in a duty of great responsibility", and was awarded to three dogs.

	Recipient(s)	Animal	Date of award	Notes	Ref(s)
#1	Hurricane	Dog	9 March 2022	A Belgian Malinois serving with the U.S. Secret Service, stopped an intruder on the White House grounds in 2014.	
#2	Smoky	Dog	9 March 2022	A Yorkshire Terrier who served in World War II. Notably pulled a communication wire through a 70-foot-long drainage culvert under a captured airstrip. Considered the first therapy dog.	
#3	Feco	Dog	9 March 2022	A Vizsla serving with the Canine Explosive Detection Team of the U.S. Coast Guard. Still serving at the time of his award, Feco has conducted over 1335 searches in the San Francisco Bay area.	
#4	Sgt. York	Horse	15 March 2023	Military Working Equine, served as riderless horse in many state funerals.	
#5	Cody	Dog	6 March 2024	A German Shepherd serving at the American embassy in Baghdad and subsequently in the United States. Performs explosives detection. Still serving at the age of thirteen.	
#6	Bane	Dog	6 March 2024	A German Shepherd who served with the St. Francis, Wisconsin police department, working in narcotics detection and apprehension.	
#7	Sonya	Dog	6 March 2024	A German Shepherd performing explosives detection with the U.S. Coast Guard in Seattle, now continuing to work as a recruiter.	
#8	Mr. Warner	Dog	11 March 2025	Belgian Malinois/Shepherd mix, worked with Springfield, MA Police Department.	
#9	Agir	Dog	11 March 2025	German Shepherd, worked with Vineland, NJ Police, saved lives on two occasions.	
#10	Mata	Dog	11 March 2025	Hungarian Shepherd/Malinois mix, worked with Wood County, TX, Constable’s Office	

== See also ==
- Dogs in warfare
- Horses in warfare
