= Gustav (pigeon) =

Pigeon of the RAF pigeon service

Gustav, also known as NPS.42.31066, was a pigeon of the RAF pigeon service. He was awarded the Dickin Medal, also known as the animals' Victoria Cross, for bringing the first report of the Normandy landings to the British mainland during the Second World War.

== Military service ==
Gustav was a grizzle colored cock pigeon trained by Frederick Jackson of Cosham, Hampshire. In his military service, he was also known by his service number NPS.42.31066. His early missions saw him carrying messages out of occupied Belgium for the resistance.

On 6 June 1944 Gustav was on–board an Allied Landing Ship Tank (LST), having become one of six pigeons given by the RAF to Reuters news correspondent Montague Taylor. Following the Normandy landings, Gustav was released by Taylor to send news back to the UK with the message, "We are just 20 miles or so off the beaches. First assault troops landed 0750. Signal says no interference from enemy gunfire on beach... Steaming steadily in formation. Lightnings, Typhoons, Fortresses crossing since 0545. No enemy aircraft seen." Gustav traveled the 150 miles (240 km) to his loft at RAF Thorney Island in five hours and sixteen minutes, while facing a headwind of up to 30 mph (48 km/h), where his handler Sgt Harry Halsey received him. Gustav's message was the first word of the invasion to reach the British mainland, due to the fleet undergoing radio silence at the time. Later that day, fellow pigeon Paddy became the first pigeon released to return to the British mainland with news of success of the landings.

For this act, he was awarded the Dickin Medal for bravery, considered to be the animal equivalent of the Victoria Cross. He was presented with his medal on 27 November 1944, by Mrs A. V. Alexander, the wife of the First Lord of the Admiralty. The citation for his Dickin Medal read, "For delivering the first message from the Normandy beaches from a ship off the beachhead while serving with the RAF on June 6 1944." He was one of thirty two pigeons awarded the medal who carried messages during the Second World War.

After the war, Gustav was given back to Fred Jackson, his original trainer, together with his Dickin Medal. This medal was later donated to the Portsmouth D-Day Museum.

== Death and legacy ==
Gustav died after the war because of old age. The story of wartime messenger pigeons such as Gustav were made into the 2005 animated film Valiant, the same year that Gustav's Dickin Medal went on display at the D-Day Museum in Portsmouth, Hampshire.

== See also ==
- List of individual birds
