= Jozef De Vroey =

Jozef De Vroey (1912–1999) was a Catholic priest and child survivor of the 19 August 1914 Aarschot massacre that occurred in World War I during the rape of Belgium and whose book about this atrocity, Aarschot op Woensdag 19 Augustus 1914 (Aarschot on Wednesday, 19 August 1914) (published in 1964, republished in 2014), has been cited by many historians, including Trinity College, Dublin, Professor Alan Kramer in his 2002 Yale University Press published book German Atrocities, 1914: A History of Denial that he co-wrote with John N. Horne. After World War II, De Vroey, also, published a book about the life, exploits and execution of Belgium spy Jozef Raskin.

== Early life and education ==
De Vroey was born in 1912 in Aarschot, Belgium. His father was one of the victims of the Aarschot massacre after he was shot and killed by German soldiers during World War I in 1914. De Vroey was barely three years old when his father died, and it influenced his attitude to Germans.

When he was 10-years-old, his mother died leaving him to be raised by the Noppen family, who were his aunt and uncle. He later became a Roman Catholic priest and taught in both Antwerp and Leuven in 1937 - 1957. Then he was a religious teacher, two years in secondary education in Westerlo and Aarschot and from 1959 to 1974 in the Atheneum in Leuven. His hatred of the German misconduct continued throughout his life.

== Book about Aarschot massacre ==
In 1964, De Vroey wrote his book Aarschot op Woensdag 19 Augustus 1914 in which he described the Aarschot massacre as being in retaliation for the murder of the German Colonel Stenger. He, also in this book, described his father's death as being caused by a bullet that pierced the Sacred Heart medallion around his neck, and ended the book with a letter to the Germans he signed and that stated that he was "one of the two hundred and thirty-four war orphans from Aarschot 1914".

== Book about Jozef Raskin ==
After World War II, De Vroey wrote the book titled Pater Raskin in de beide wereldoorlogen (Father Raskin in both world wars) detailing the life and exploits of the Belgium Roman Catholic Church priest Jozef Raskin who was a spy in both World War I and World War II and was guillotined by the Nazi Germans on 18 October 1943.

== Bibliography ==
- Pater Raskin in de beide wereldoorlogen, 1947
- Aarschot op Woensdag, 1964
