= Jozef Raskin =

Belgian artist, painter, draftsman, and Scheutist missionary

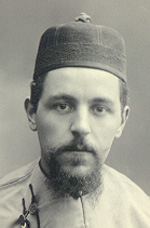
- Born: Jozef Maria Raskin; 21 June 1892; Stevoort, Belgium
- Died: 18 October 1943 (aged 51); Dortmund, Germany
- Cause of death: Execution by guillotine
- Other name: Leopold Vindictive 200
- Occupations: Missionary, spy

Jozef Maria Raskin (21 June 1892 – 18 October 1943) was a Belgian artist, painter, draftsman, and Scheutist missionary who served in World War I and became a missionary in China from 1920 to 1934. Later, during World War II, he was drafted into the Belgian army as a chaplain and was a personal advisor to King Leopold III. While operating under the code name Leopold Vindictive 200 for the Belgian resistance, on 1 May 1942 he was arrested by the Gestapo, tried and convicted, and on 18 October 1943 was guillotined. A statue honoring his service stands in Aarschot. After World War II, a book about Raskin's exploits in both world wars was written by Jozef De Vroey, himself a Catholic priest and survivor of both these conflicts, under the title Pater Raskin in de beide wereldoorlogen (Father Raskin in Both World Wars).

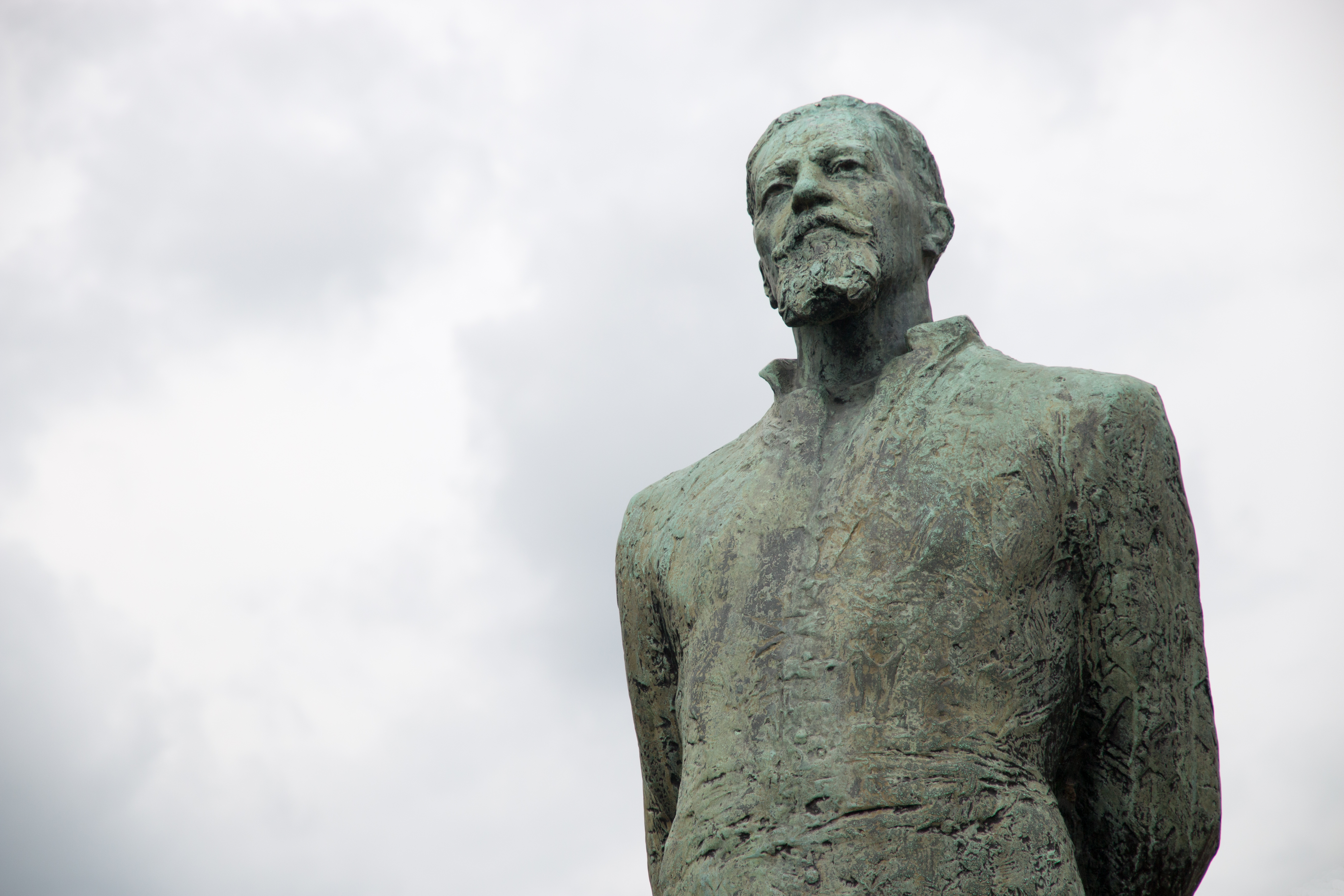
Statue of Jozef Raskin

== Early life and education ==
Jozef Raskin was born in Stevoort, Belgium, in 1892. He was the eldest son of Amandus and Marie Léonie (née Cleeren). He studied in a college in Sint-Truiden and took his vows in 1910 with the CICM Missionaries, a Catholic religious order widely known as the Scheut Missionaries.

== World War I ==
After becoming a deacon on 25 July 1914, Raskin was mobilized into the Belgian army where, due to a shortage of uniforms, he continued to wear his cassock. He was captured on the front lines with the Germans giving him an automatic death sentence, as soldiers disguised as priests were suspected of carrying secret documents, but he successfully escaped from his captors. As a front-line soldier and observer of enemy lines, his skills in drawing were particularly noted.

== Missionary in China ==
After his ordination by the CICM Missionaries on 2 February 1920, he was stationed as a missionary to Inner Mongolia, China, where he became fluent in both the spoken and written Chinese language. While attached to the Apostolic Vicariate of Xiwanzi there, he taught natural sciences. In February 1934 he returned to Belgium and became a writer for his order.

== World War II ==
At the outbreak of World War II, Raskin was drafted as a chaplain into the Belgian military. In this role, he was the personal adviser to King Leopold III, and celebrated Mass with the monarch.

Following defeat in the Battle of Belgium, Raskin used the code name "Leopold Vindictive 200" while working for the Dutch resistance. His knowledge of radio allowed him to eavesdrop on the transmissions between the various Wehrmacht commands occupying Belgium. He also spent much of his time mapping the German positions on the Belgian coast. He worked with MI14 section "d" (the "Secret Pigeon Service") to convey his intelligence reports to England using the birds. Containers carrying the birds would be parachuted to him in occupied Belgium. His reports were dispatched in small 3 mm (0.12 in) wide tubes attached to the pigeons legs. Although written on ultra thin paper, Raskin wrote in-depth reports which included detailed sketches of enemy positions and up to 5,000-word memos. An example of one such message from Raskin, which was flown to Britain by pigeon, is now archived in the UK's National Archives under the heading "Source Message No. 37", it read:

This message is from Leopold Vindictive 200. Please tell us if you get it in your normal news transmission, – in Dutch twice and in Radio Belgique twice, with the hour of arrival and as soon as you get it. Please say what was unknown to you, only giving the letters of the maps (A.B.C., etc) with "were unknown" or more about "........ is asked for". This information is thoroughly reliable and here is our guarantee or warranty: We are a staff of three principals and Several (? Seven) secondary agents but identify me as follows: – I am the bearded Military Chaplain who shook hands with Admiral Keyes on the morning of 27 May 1940 at about 7.30. Ask the Admiral please where he was exactly at that moment with my most respectful greetings.

=== Arrest and execution ===
On 1 May 1942, Raskin was betrayed as a spy by a man dressed as a beggar and was arrested by the Gestapo. While imprisoned awaiting trial, he was described by other prisoners as being "a learned man, uplifting, eloquent, a support and an example" who sang every night, told stories of his years in China, and heard confessions from his fellow inmates. On 31 August 1943 he was tried and convicted, offering as his only defense: Im Gewissen und vor Gott habe ich meine Pflicht getan (In conscience and before God I have done my duty). The following day, 1 September 1943, he was sentenced to death and on 18 October 1943, at 1843 hours, he was guillotined in Dortmund Prison.

He was buried in Stevoort.

== Memorial ==
A statue was erected in his honor in Aarschot.

== Bibliography ==
- (in Dutch) Pater M.-J. Raskin (memorial edition). Davidsfonds: Stevoort-Wijer, 1993
- (in Dutch) Pater Raskin in de beide wereldoorlogen, J. de Vroey, Hertogelijke Aarschotse Kring voor Heemkunde, 1992.
- (in Dutch) De eeuw van de ekster. Een Belgisch levensverhaal, Brigitte Raskin, Amsterdam: Meulenhoff, 1994.
- (in Dutch) "Pater Raskin krijgt beeld in geboorteplaats Stevoort". Het Belang van Limburg (in Dutch). 29 September 2008.
- (in Dutch) Raskin Jozef / Leopold Vindictive – uit: Stevoort ... warm aanbevolen: Vroeger en nu (in Dutch). Hasselt. 2002. pp. 20–22 – via hasel.be.
- (in Dutch) Maarten Snoeks (2006). Wandelen in Stevoort: Wijkwandelingen Erfgoedcel Hasselt (in Dutch).
- (in Dutch) "Pater Raskin krijgt beeld in geboorteplaats Stevoort" (PDF) (in Dutch). Hasselt.
