= United States Army Pigeon Service =

US Army homing pigeon unit

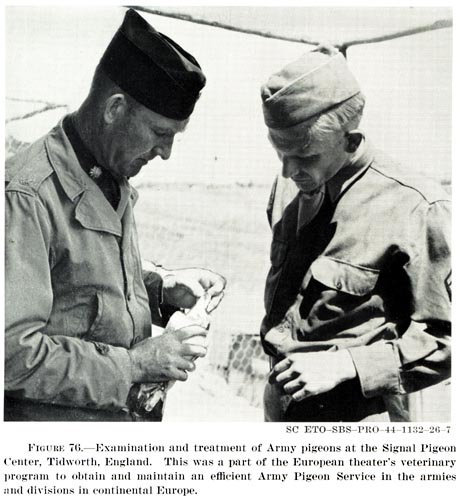
A war pigeon at Signal Pigeon Center Tidworth, United Kingdom

The United States Army Pigeon Service, also known as the Signal Pigeon Corps, was a United States Army communications service that trained and used homing pigeons to carry military messages. The service was created during World War I, continued after the war under the United States Army Signal Corps, and remained in use through World War II and the Korean War before being discontinued in 1957.

== History ==
The U.S. Army began organizing a pigeon service after General John J. Pershing observed the use of pigeons by French and British forces during World War I. In November 1917, the Signal Corps' Pigeon Service received official authorization, and a formal table of organization for a pigeon company was issued in 1918. By the end of the war, the Signal Corps had sent more than 15,000 trained pigeons to the American Expeditionary Forces.

Pigeons were used to carry orders, reports, and other messages when telephone, telegraph, runner, or radio communication was unavailable or unreliable. During the Meuse-Argonne offensive, 442 American pigeons carried 403 messages over distances of up to 50 kilometres without a lost dispatch.

After World War I, the Army continued the service. The Signal Corps established the Signal Corps Pigeon Breeding and Training Section at Camp Alfred Vail, New Jersey, later renamed Fort Monmouth. The program developed improved breeding, training, and equipment, including techniques for two-way flight and over-water flight.

During World War II, the Signal Corps furnished about 54,000 pigeons to the armed services. Approximately 40,000 of these birds were supplied voluntarily by civilian pigeon fanciers. The Fort Monmouth Pigeon Center had an emergency breeding capacity of about 1,000 birds per month. Pigeons were used in several theatres of the war, including the North African and Italian campaigns.

The service continued after World War II and was used during the Korean War, including for communications by covert operatives operating behind enemy lines. By the mid-1950s, however, advances in radio communication and aircraft support had made pigeon communication largely obsolete. Chief Signal Officer Major General James D. O'Connell ordered the service disbanded at the end of 1956, and the Army discontinued the Pigeon Service in 1957. Fifteen surviving "hero pigeons" were donated to zoos, while about 1,000 remaining birds were sold to the public.

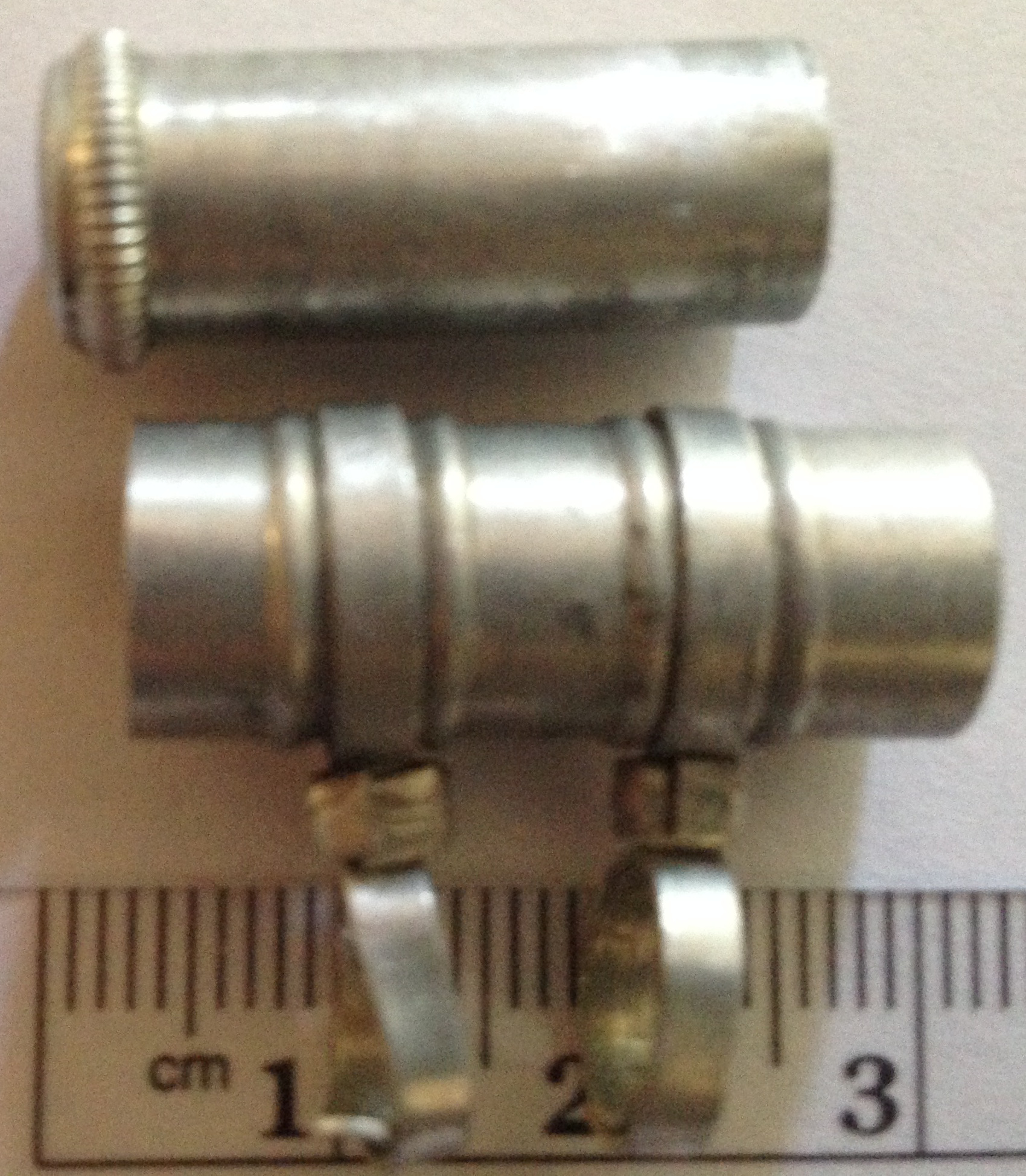
An aluminium PG-14 message holder for attachment to a war pigeon's leg, U.S. Army Signal Corps, World War I

== Notable pigeons ==
=== G.I. Joe ===
G.I. Joe was a United States Army pigeon used during the Italian Campaign of World War II. On 18 October 1943, Allied forces captured the village of Calvi Vecchia, Italy, earlier than expected. Because an Allied air attack on the village was already scheduled, G.I. Joe was released with a message to cancel the bombing. He flew about 20 miles in 20 minutes and reached Allied lines before the aircraft took off, preventing a friendly-fire attack.

G.I. Joe received the Dickin Medal in London on 4 November 1946. The People's Dispensary for Sick Animals described his flight as the most outstanding made by a United States Army pigeon in World War II.

=== President Wilson ===
President Wilson was a World War I pigeon bred in France and used by the U.S. Army. He began service with the Army's Tank Corps and carried messages during the Battle of Saint-Mihiel. He was later transferred to I Corps Signal during the Meuse-Argonne offensive.

On 5 November 1918, President Wilson carried a message through heavy fire over a distance of about 40 kilometres. He arrived in about 25 minutes despite severe wounds, including the loss of one leg and a chest wound. After the war, he lived at Fort Monmouth and died on 8 June 1929. His remains were later donated to the Smithsonian Institution.

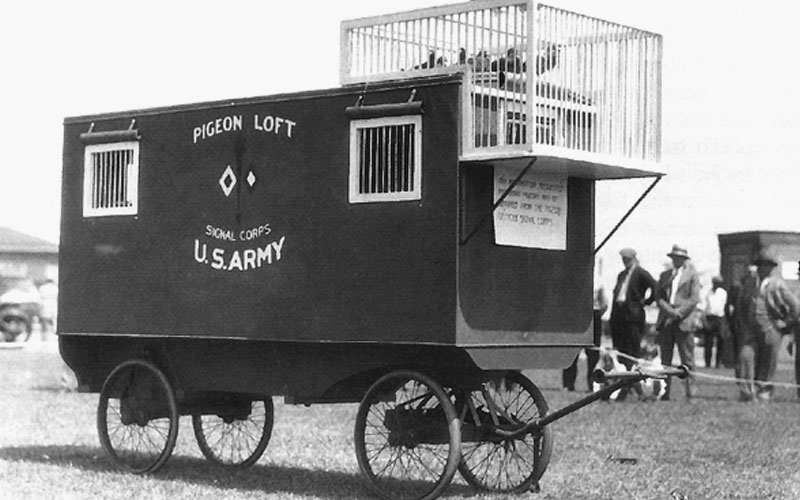
The pigeon loft at Rampont, France

=== Cher Ami ===
Cher Ami was a homing pigeon used by the U.S. Army Signal Corps during World War I. He was one of 600 English-bred pigeons donated to the American Expeditionary Forces by the British Home Forces Pigeon Service in May 1918.

Cher Ami is traditionally credited with carrying a message from the surrounded Lost Battalion during the Meuse-Argonne offensive on 4 October 1918. The Smithsonian Institution states that the surviving evidence is inconclusive, but that Cher Ami may have carried the message that helped identify the battalion's position and contributed to its relief. The U.S. Army has also noted that recent scholarship questions parts of the traditional story and suggests that the account may have been shaped in part to promote the Signal Corps Pigeon Service.

Cher Ami was wounded during service and later had his right leg amputated. The French government awarded him the Croix de Guerre with palm. After his death in 1919, the U.S. Army Signal Corps donated his remains to the Smithsonian Institution, where he was preserved for display.

== Care and maintenance ==
The Army's use of pigeons created a need for veterinary support, disease control, suitable feed, and appropriate housing. During World War II, the Army Veterinary Service supported the Pigeon Service by advising on the care, feeding, housing, transport, quarantine, and disease prevention of signal pigeons.

Feed and housing were recurring problems, especially overseas. Pigeon feed shipped in burlap bags could be damaged by rough handling, moisture, rodents, mold, or vermin. Lofts also had to be adapted to local conditions while remaining dry, sanitary, exposed to sunlight, and protected from drafts.
