= Nemo A534 =

War dog

- Species: Canis familiaris
- Breed: German Shepherd
- Sex: Male
- Died: December 1972; Lackland Air Force Base; San Antonio, Texas
- Occupation: War dog
- Employer: United States Air Force

Nemo A534 was a German Shepherd that served in the United States Air Force during the Vietnam War.

== Airman Robert Throneburg ==
Airman Robert "Bob" Throneburg was born September 22, 1944, in North Carolina to R.A. Throneburg and Mary Brooks Throneburg. He graduated from Albemarle High School. At 22 years of age, he was assigned to the 377th Air Police Squadron at Tan Son Nhut Air Base near Saigon, Vietnam as a sentry dog handler. He was paired with a German Shepherd named Nemo A534. He had been in country for at least 5 months when the December 1966 attack on Tan Son Nhut AB occurred.

== Viet Cong attack on Tan Son Nhut Air Base December 4, 1966 ==
Tan Son Nhut Air Base was to be used by U.S. military forces to move up to 5,000 troops and a large supply of weapons in preparation for Operation Cedar Falls. However, Special Forces Unit F100 of the Viet Cong (VC) had acquired intelligence about the U.S. operation and began to encroach on the air base perimeter with a planned attack.

== December 4, 1966 ==
During the night of December 4, 1966, A2C Throneburg and Nemo were patrolling the Air Base looking for four VC combatants that had evaded detection in an earlier incursion by 60 VC into the base perimeter. In the course of their patrol, Nemo alerted, and hostile fire erupted. Throneburg released Nemo to attack then used his rifle to engage the enemy, killing two VC. During the firefight, Throneburg was struck by gun fire in his shoulder but was able to radio for backup. Nemo also was hit – a bullet entered under his right eye and exited through his mouth. Despite his severe injuries, Nemo was credited with saving the life of his handler. Crawling across Throneburg's body, Nemo guarded his handler against anyone who dared to come near him until medical help arrived. The remaining VC were eliminated by backup security forces.

== Nemo's return home ==
Nemo recovered from his wound but lost an eye. He was one of the first K-9 units retired, and was sent to Lackland Air Force Base. There, he continued working as a recruiting dog, and his kennel was designated as a memorial. Nemo died in December 1972 at Lackland AFB.

== Throneburg post service ==
Throneburg recovered from his wounds and was reunited with Nemo prior to leaving Vietnam. He received two Purple Hearts, the Bronze Star Medal and the Warrior's Medal of Valor for his actions. After military discharge, Throneburg returned to North Carolina. He earned a degree in architectural drafting and was employed at McGuire Nuclear Station from 1976 to 1999, and at Catawba Nuclear Station in 2001.

On February 5, 2020, Robert Throneburg died at age 75 in Gaffney, South Carolina.

== Nemo A534 memorial ==
The first memorial for Nemo A534 was dedicated on November 15, 2005, at the 37th Security Forces Squadron kennel compound, Lackland AFB. In 2013, the memorial was relocated to the Joint Base San Antonio, Security Forces Museum.

== See also ==
- List of individual dogs
