= Lucca (dog) =

War dog

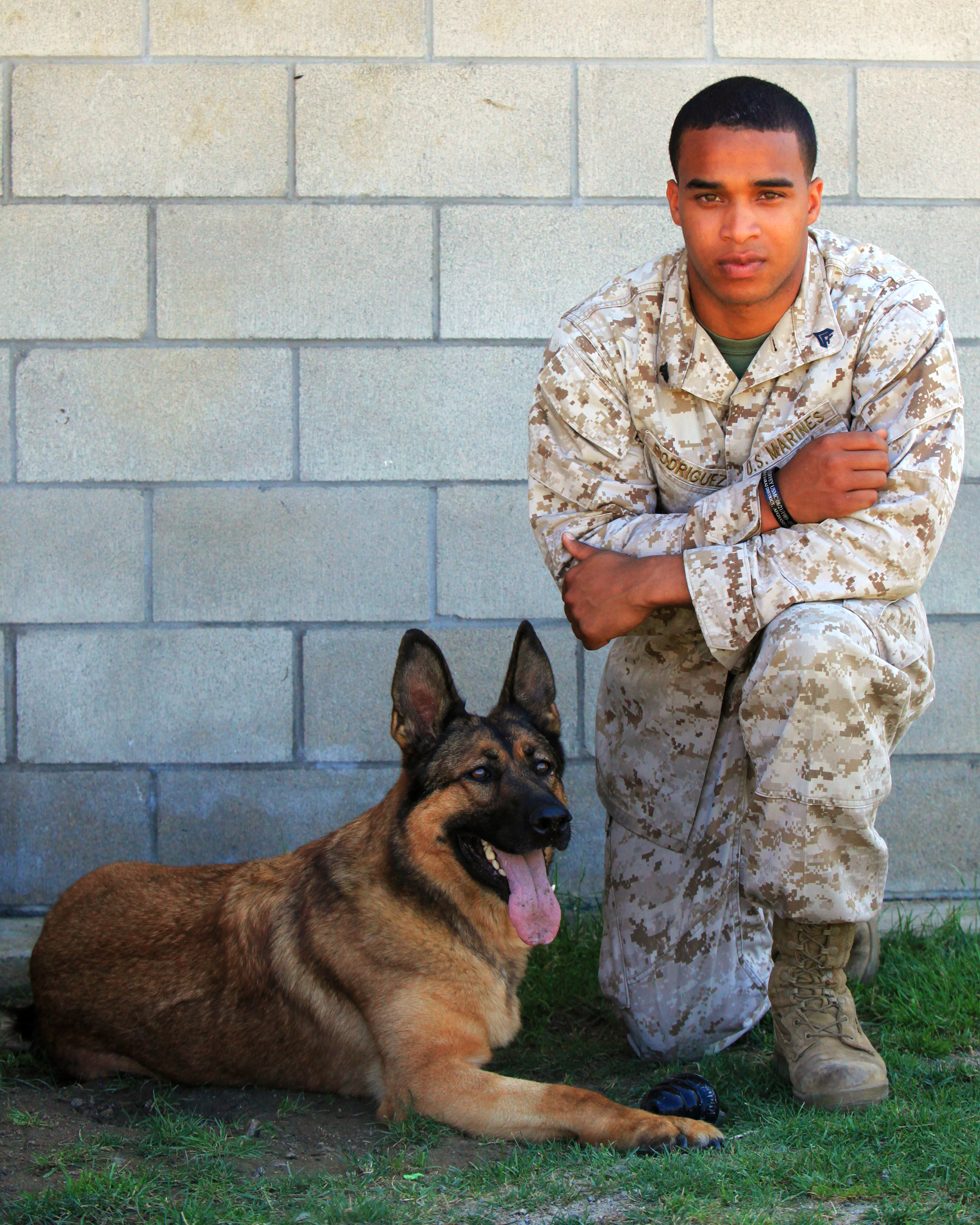
- Lucca with her handler, Cpl Juan M Rodriguez
- Species: Canis familiaris
- Breed: German Shepherd/ Belgian Malinois
- Sex: Female
- Born: 2003 or 2004; Netherlands
- Died: 20 January 2018 (aged 14); California, US
- Employer: United States Marine Corps
- Notable role: Dogs in warfare / Detection dog
- Years active: 6
- Awards: Dickin Medal; Animals in War & Peace Medal of Bravery

Lucca (born 2003 or 2004, died 2018) was a German Shepherd/Belgian Malinois working dog who was employed by the United States Marine Corps for 6 years. She was trained to detect explosives. She was deployed twice to Iraq and once to Afghanistan. In her over 400 missions, no human fatalities occurred under her watch. In 2012, while on patrol in Afghanistan, she was injured by an IED blast, necessitating the amputation of her left leg. After recovering at Camp Pendleton, Lucca officially retired in 2012 and was adopted by her original handler, Gunnery Sergeant Chris Willingham.

On 5 April 2016, the People's Dispensary for Sick Animals (PDSA), a veterinary charity in the United Kingdom, awarded Lucca the Dickin Medal. It is considered to be the animal equivalent of the Victoria Cross, and was the 67th time that the medal has been awarded. This was the first time a U.S. Marine Corps dog was awarded this honour. Lucca also received an unofficial Purple Heart plaque and ribbons from a two-time Marine recipient of the award.

Lucca is interred at the Michigan War Dog Memorial in South Lyon, Michigan.

== Military career ==
Lucca was born in the Netherlands. The Israel Defense Forces brought her to Israel and she trained there for six months with an American team. She was then inducted at Lackland in the United States and brought to the Yuma Proving Ground in Arizona for training in an environment similar to Iraq. She served two tours of duty with the U.S. Marine Corps during her six years of service. During that time, she completed more than 400 missions. She was trained as a specialized search dog, and belonged to an elite group of canines capable of working off-leash at long distances from their handlers in dangerous situations. On her missions, no humans accompanying her were ever injured. Specifically, the dog's record of military service included Afghanistan with more than 400 patrols and three combat tours in Iraq. She was credited with finding ammunition, explosives and insurgents at least 40 times, without a single human fatality under her watch.

The PDSA noted that she protected thousands of human lives as part of her assignments. On her last mission in 2012, when she was on patrol in Afghanistan, she sniffed out a 30-pound (13.6-kilogram) IED and was continuing her search when she lost one of her legs when another IED detonated underneath her. Cpl. Juan Rodriguez, her handler, thought she had been killed, but was able to rescue her. He administered first aid, and Lucca was then airlifted to Germany for medical treatment and rehabilitation. Ten days after the explosion, she was walking again. Following her recovery from her injury, Lucca was retired. She lived in California with Gunnery Sgt. Chris Willingham and his family.

According to Amy Dickin, the dispensary's spokesperson, the award of the Dickin Medal to Lucca garnered more "public attention than any other Dickin Medal honoree in the program's 73-year history." In November 2019 Lucca became one of the first winners of the Animals in War & Peace Medal of Bravery, bestowed posthumously on her in a ceremony on Capitol Hill in Washington, D.C.

The story of Lucca's life was turned into a book, Top Dog: The Story of Marine Hero Lucca by Maria Goodavage.

Lucca died on 20 January 2018.

== See also ==
- List of individual dogs
