= Lex (dog) =

Military dog

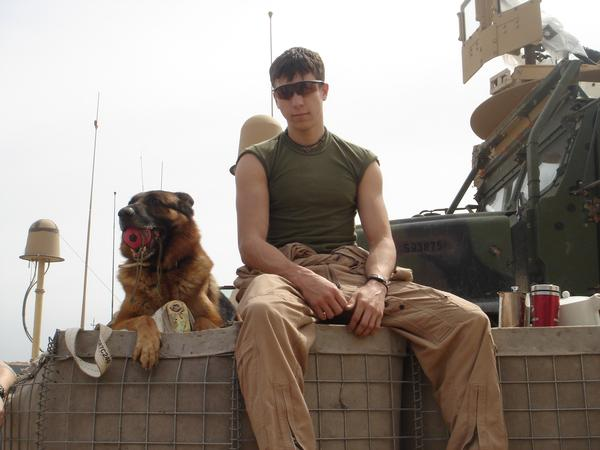
- Dustin Lee and Lex in Iraq
- Born: 1999; Lackland AFB, Texas
- Died: March 25, 2012 (aged 12–13); Starkville, Mississippi
- Military career
- Allegiance: United States
- Branch: United States Marine Corps
- Service years: 2002–2007
- Rank: SSG
- Service number: E132
- Unit: MCLB Albany
- Conflicts: Iraq War (WIA)
- Awards: honorary Purple Heart
- Other work: therapy dog

Lex (1999 – March 25, 2012) was a German Shepherd military working dog who served with the United States Marine Corps and became the first active-duty, fully fit military dog to be granted early retirement for adoption. Lex was wounded in Iraq in an attack that killed his handler, Corporal Dustin J. Lee. He later became a therapy dog and received an honorary Purple Heart.

== Military working dog ==
Lex and Corporal Lee were stationed in the military police department at Marine Corps Logistics Base Albany. Lex had previously deployed to Iraq with a different handler. Lee had adopted his earlier retired working dog, Doenja. In November 2006, Lex and Lee were deployed to Iraq as an explosive detection and patrol team for the 3rd Reconnaissance Battalion, part of Regimental Combat Team 6. On March 21, 2007, while stationed at a Forward Operating Base in Iraq, they were struck by a 73 mm SPG-9 rocket attack. Lee was mortally wounded, and Lex sustained shrapnel injuries. Despite his own wounds, Lex refused to leave Lee's side and had to be pulled away so corpsmen and other medics could attend to his handler. Lex returned to the U.S. in April and underwent a 12-week rehabilitation at Marine Corps Base Camp Lejeune eventually returning to full duty at MCLB Albany. Some shrapnel remained embedded in his back, but veterinarians decided not to remove it to avoid spinal damage.

== Adoption ==
We are proud to have had Lex serve alongside Marines here and around the world. His handlers and his sacrifices will not be forgotten. I am glad to be able to support the Lee family, not just in the adoption of Lex, but also to reestablish their connection to their beloved son Dustin.

— Col Christian N. Haliday, CO of MCLB Albany

Following Lee's death, his parents, Jerome and Rachel Lee, campaigned to adopt Lex. With support from Congressman Walter B. Jones and national media attention, the family launched a petition that brought widespread awareness to their request. Congressman Walter B. Jones of North Carolina's 3rd congressional district (which includes Camp Lejeune) assisted the Lee family with the release and adoption of Lex. Although the United States armed forces do not generally release military working dogs prior to retirement age due to certain requirements (due to 10 U.S.C. § 2583), there existed a provision to existing law that allows for early retirement of dogs under certain situations, created to allow a wounded Air Force dog handler to adopt her partner before retirement in 2005. The legal provision was enacted and Lex was released from active service to be adopted by the Lee family.

Headquarters Marine Corps made a formal request to the Air Force working dog program managers at Lackland Air Force Base in November, which was approved on December 6. Lex was released from five years of active service and turned over to the Lee family at a ceremony at MCLB Albany on December 21, 2007, under national media spotlight. He was 8 years old at the time. Afterward, Lex began to visit VA hospitals to comfort wounded veterans and assist in their recovery process. On February 16, 2008, the Military Order of the Purple Heart Chapter #566 presented Lex with a commemorative Purple Heart at a ceremony held at the Air Force Armament Museum at Eglin Air Force Base. On September 24, 2008, the American Kennel Club announced that Lex won the seventh Law Enforcement AKC Award for Canine Excellence. On March 19, 2010, MCLB Albany's base dog kennel was named in honor of Lee, with Lex in attendance.

== Post-Service Life ==
After adoption, Lex visited VA hospitals to comfort wounded veterans, becoming a symbol of resilience and healing. He received a commemorative Purple Heart from the Military Order of the Purple Heart Chapter #566 on February 16, 2008, at Eglin Air Force Base. Later that year, the American Kennel Club honored Lex with the Law Enforcement AKC Award for Canine Excellence.

On March 19, 2010, the dog kennel at MCLB Albany was named in Corporal Lee's honor, with Lex present at the dedication.

Despite continued treatment, Lex struggled with mobility issues due to approximately 50 pieces of shrapnel still lodged in his body. In November 2010, he began stem cell regenerative therapy at Georgetown Veterinary Hospital with support from the Humane Society and Congressman Ed Whitfield.

== Death ==
Lex died on March 25, 2012, as a result of cancer.

== Gallery ==
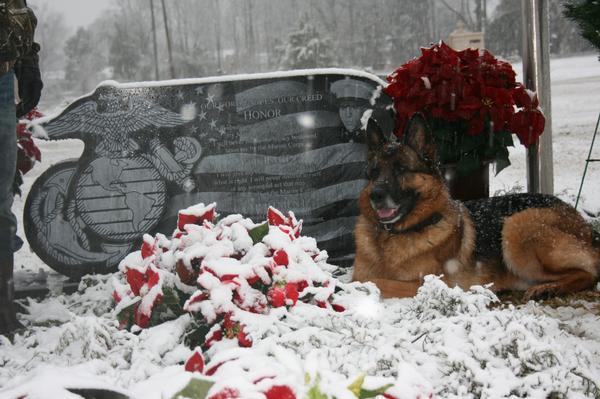
Lex at Lee's grave

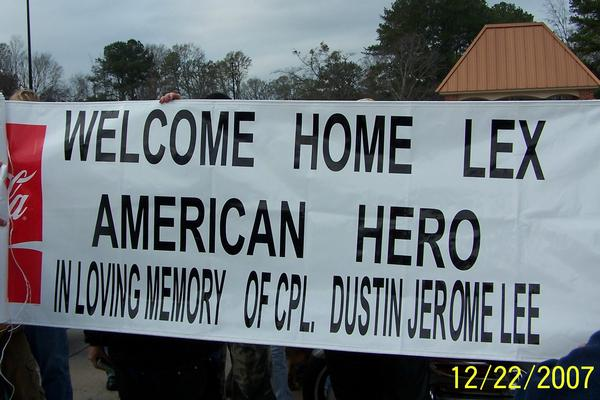
Banner at Lex's adoption ceremony

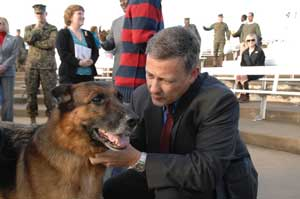
Jerome Lee and Lex at the adoption ceremony

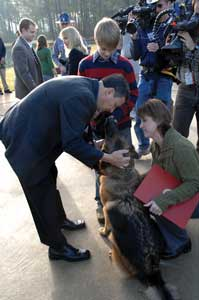
The Lee family with Lex after the adoption ceremony

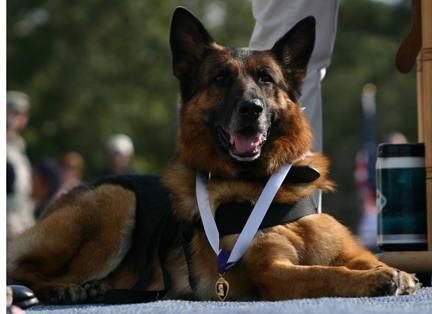
Lex awarded an honorary Purple Heart

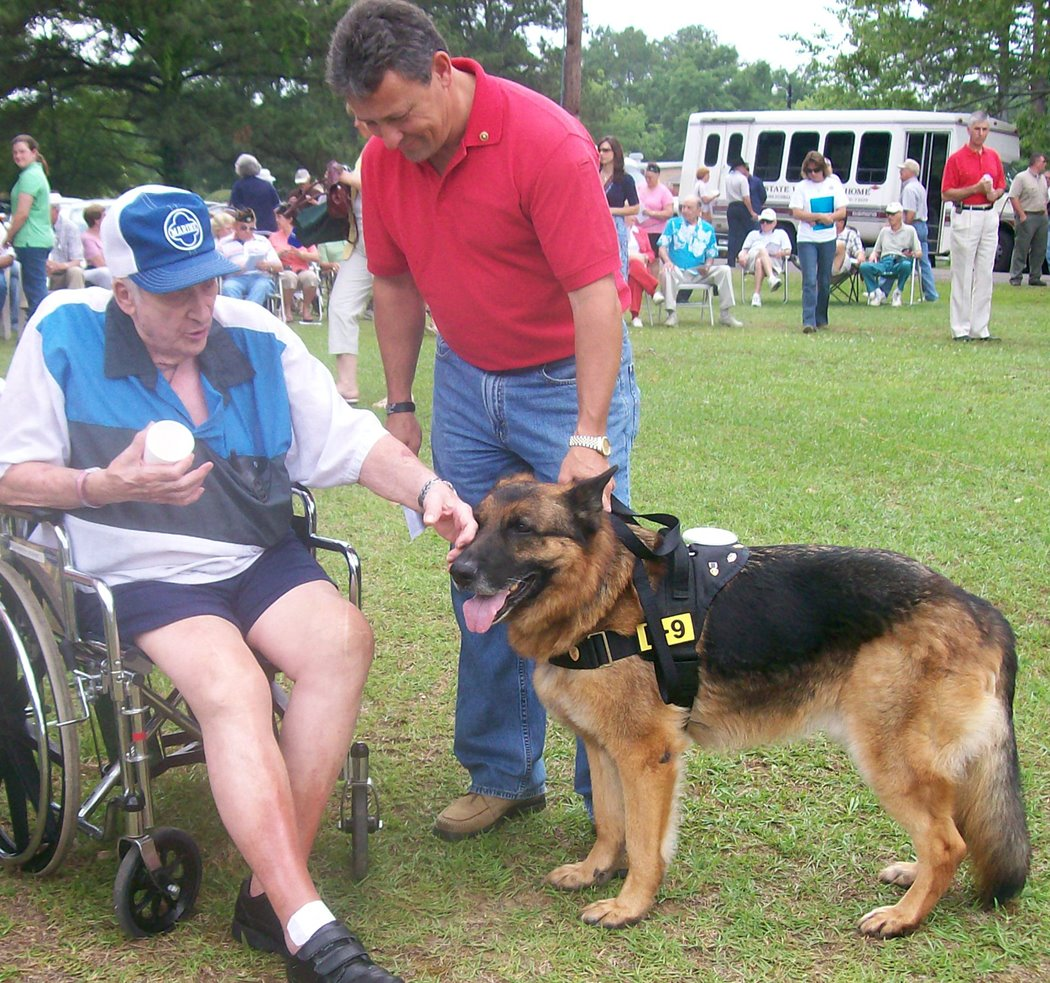
Jerome Lee and Lex meet with World War II veterans

== See also ==
- Dogs in warfare
- List of individual dogs
- Military animal
