= Paddy (pigeon) =

Irish carrier pigeon awarded the Dickin Medal

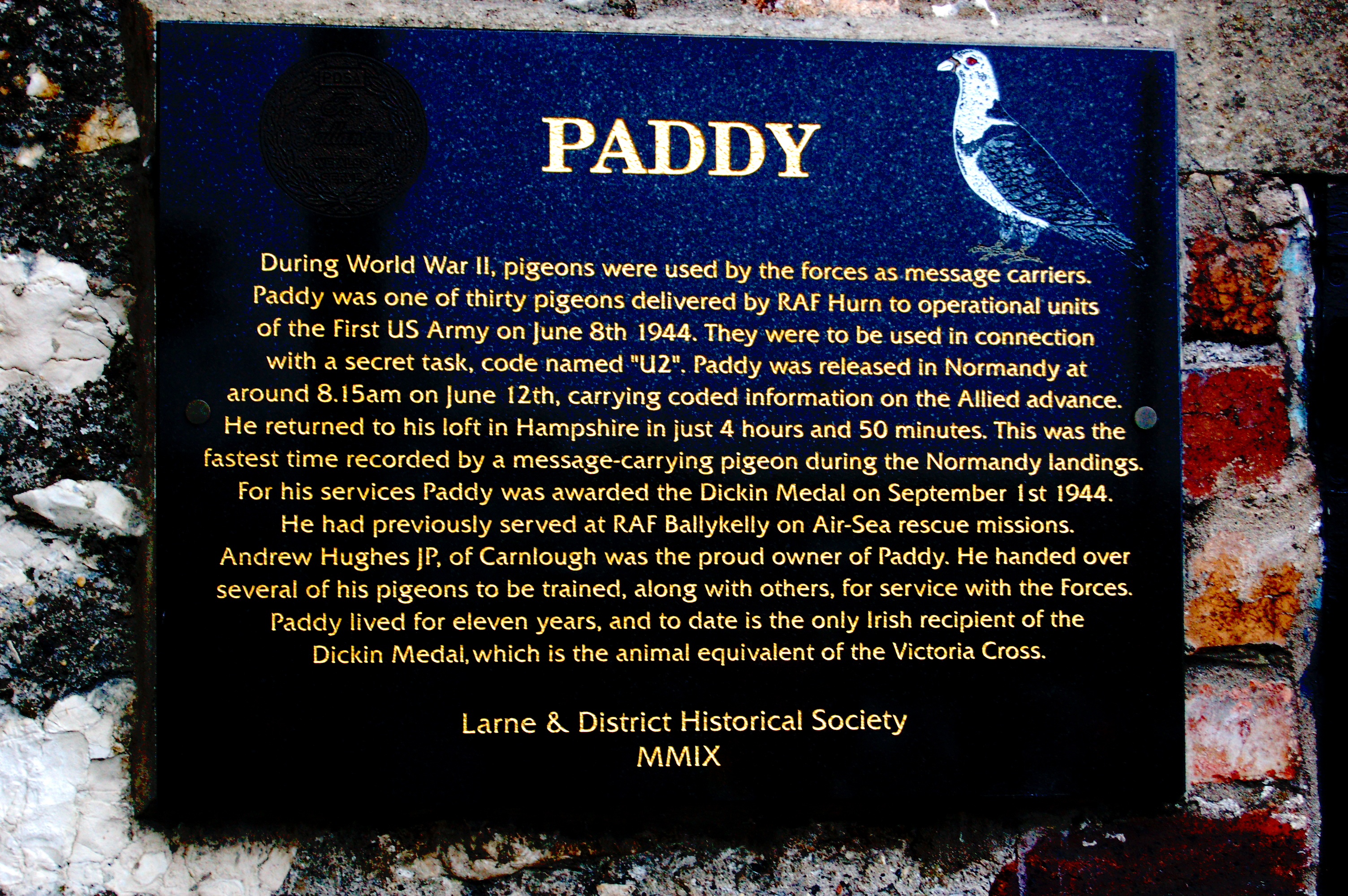
Memorial in Carnlough, County Antrim, Northern Ireland

Paddy (Pigeon number NPS.43.9451) was an Irish carrier pigeon awarded the Dickin Medal after being the fastest pigeon to arrive back in England with news of the success of the D-Day invasion, out of hundreds dispatched. He flew 230 miles (370 km) across the English Channel in four hours and fifty minutes, the fastest recorded crossing, and was awarded the medal on 1 September 1944, just under three months after the crossing. Paddy was trained by Andrew Hughes of Carnlough and is the only animal in Ireland to be awarded this medal.

The medal citation reads,

"For the best recorded time with a message from the Normandy Operations, while serving with the RAF in June, 1944."

His medal was sold at auction for almost £7,000 in September 1999.

In June 2024, a memorial plaque to Paddy in Carnlough, County Antrim, which had become a minor tourist attraction, was destroyed in an act of "senseless vandalism". The Carnlough Community Association Group announced plans to replace the memorial.

== Flight ==
Paddy's leg was attached with a coded letter, bringing the news that the D-day landings were a success. Out of all 32 pigeons released from Normandy sent back to England he was the fastest. Crossing the channel's length of 220 miles or (328km) in the timeframe of four hours and 50 minutes. Leaving Paddy with an average speed of 56mph.

== See also ==
- List of individual birds
