= G.I. Joe (pigeon) =

US Army homing pigeon in WWII

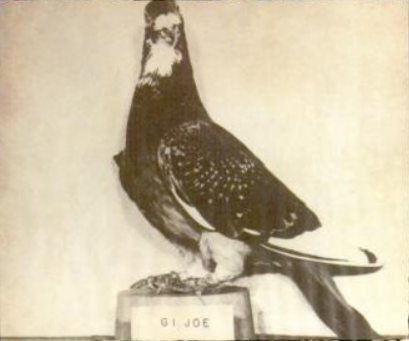
- G.I. Joe on display
- Born: March 24, 1943; Algiers, Algeria
- Died: June 3, 1961 (aged 18); Detroit, Michigan, U.S.
- Burial place: United States Army Heritage and Education Center, Carlisle Pennsylvania
- Military career
- Allegiance: United States
- Branch: United States Army
- Service years: 1943–1945
- Service number: USA/43/SC/6390
- Conflicts: World War II
- Awards: Dickin Medal; Animals in War & Peace Medal of Bravery

G.I. Joe (March 24, 1943 – June 3, 1961) was an Algerian born military-affiliated pigeon noted for his service in the United States Army Pigeon Service. The bird was one of the homing pigeons used during World War II for communication and reconnaissance purposes.

== Early life ==
He was hatched in March 1943, in Algiers, North Africa.

== Military career ==
He underwent a training for two-way homing pigeons perfected at Fort Monmouth, in New Jersey. eventually getting the tag Pigeon USA43SC6390.

During the Italian Campaign of World War II, G.I. Joe saved the lives of the inhabitants of the village of Calvi Vecchia, Italy, and of the British troops of 56th (London) Infantry Division occupying it. Air support had been previously requested against German positions at Calvi Vecchia on 18 October 1943. However, the 169th (London) Infantry Brigade attacked and won back the village from the Germans ahead of schedule, but was unable to transmit a message via radio to call off the planned American air raid. G.I. Joe was dispatched as a last resort to carry the message and arrived in the air base just in time to prevent the Allied air force from bombing its own men. G.I. Joe flew this 20-mile distance in an impressive 20 minutes, just as the planes were preparing to take off for the target. Over 100 men were saved.

On 4 November 1946, G.I. Joe was presented the Dickin Medal for gallantry by Major-General Charles Keightley at the Tower of London. The citation credits him with "the most outstanding flight made by a United States Army homing pigeon in World War II". The award is considered the equivalent of the Victoria Cross or the Medal of Honor for animals. G.I. Joe was the 29th and the first non-British recipient of the medal.

== Death ==
After World War II, he was housed at the U.S. Army's Churchill Loft at Fort Monmouth, in New Jersey, along with 24 other heroic pigeons. He died at the Detroit Zoological Gardens at the age of eighteen and two months, and was mounted and displayed at the U.S. Army Communications Electronics Museum at Fort Monmouth. G.I. Joe was removed from display at Fort Monmouth after its closure in 2005, but is currently on display in the U.S. Army Heritage and Education Center in Carlisle, Pennsylvania.

== Awards ==
In 2019, he was posthumously awarded the Animals in War & Peace Medal of Bravery.

== See also ==
- List of individual birds
