= HMS Bideford (L43) =

Sloop of the Royal Navy

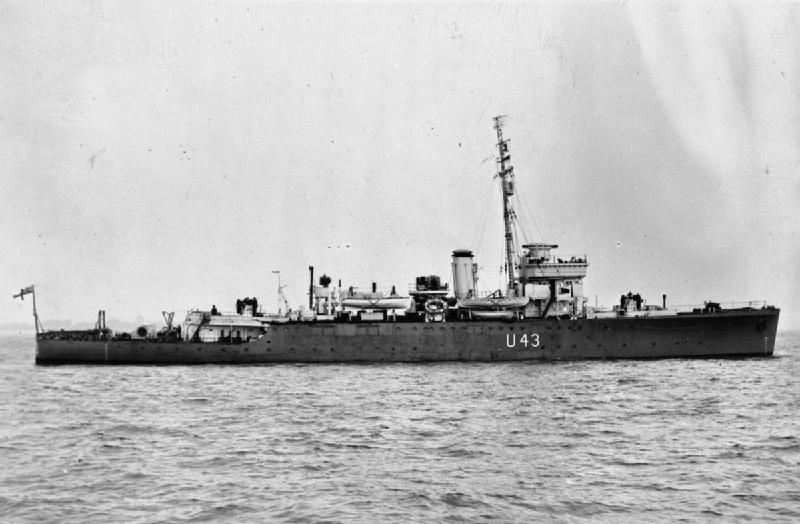

History

United Kingdom
- Name: HMS Bideford
- Builder: Devonport Dockyard
- Laid down: 10 June 1930
- Launched: 1 April 1931
- Completed: 27 November 1931
- Commissioned: 23 February 1932
- Identification: Pennant number: L43 (later U43)
- Motto: 'Bide your time'
- Honours and awards: Atlantic 1939-45; Dunkirk 1940; North Africa 1942; Biscay 1943; English Channel 1945
- Fate: Sold for scrapping on 14 July 1949
- Badge: On a Field Blue, a Bridge silver, beneath it a ship silver upon 2 wavelets gold and green.

General characteristics
- Class & type: Shoreham-class sloop
- Displacement: 1,150 tons
- Length: 281 ft (86 m)
- Beam: 35 ft (11 m)
- Draught: 8 ft 3 in (2.51 m)
- Propulsion: Geared turbines; two shafts; 2,000 shp (1,500 kW)
- Speed: 16 knots (30 km/h)
- Complement: 95
- Armament: 2 × QF 4-inch (101.6 mm) Mk V guns (2×1); 4 .5" MG A/A (1×4)

HMS Bideford was a Royal Navy Shoreham-class sloop. She was named after the town of Bideford in Devon and was launched on 1 April 1931.

== Construction and design ==
The British Admiralty ordered four sloops of the new Shoreham class as part of the 1929 construction programme, with two each ordered from Devonport and Chatham dockyards. They were an improved version of the Hastings class of the 1928 programme, which were themselves a modification of the Bridgewater class.

Bideford was 281 feet 4 inches (85.75 m) long overall, with a beam of 35 feet (10.67 m) and a draught of 10 feet 4 inches (3.15 m). Displacement was 1,100 long tons (1,100 t) standard. Two Admiralty 3-drum water-tube boilers fed two geared steam turbines which drove two propeller shafts. The machinery was rated at 2,000 shaft horsepower (1,500 kW), giving a speed of 16.5 knots (30.6 km/h; 19.0 mph).

The ship's main gun armament consisted of two 4-inch (102 mm) QF Mk V guns mounted fore-and-aft on the ship's centreline, with the forward gun on a High-Angle (HA) anti-aircraft mounting and the aft gun on a Low-Angle (LA) mounting, suitable only for use against surface targets. Four 3-pounder saluting guns completed the ship's gun armament.

Bideford was laid down at Devonport on 10 June 1930, launched on 1 April 1931 and completed on 27 November 1931.

=== Modifications ===
In 1938, Bideford's anti-aircraft armament was improved by replacing the aft 4-inch gun by a similar gun on a HA mounting, while a quadruple Vickers .50 machine gun mount was fitted for close-in anti-aircraft duties. The ship's 3-pounder saluting guns were removed during the Second World War to allow the addition of Oerlikon 20 mm cannon, with two Oerlikons being fitted in March 1941 and a further two fitted in March 1942. The ship's anti-submarine armament was gradually increased during the war, with the number of depth charges carried increasing from 15 to as many as 90. Other wartime changes included the fitting of radar and HF/DF radio direction-finding gear.

== Service ==
Following commissioning Bideford was sent to the Persian Gulf, serving there from January 1932. Bideford was refitted at Colombo, Ceylon from December 1932 to February 1933 and again from March–April 1934 and from July–August 1936. On 28 August 1936, an Imperial Airways Handley Page H.P.42 airliner went missing on a flight from Basra to Bahrain, and Bideford and sister ship Fowey took part in the search for the airliner, which had safely force-landed south of Doha. Bideford underwent another short refit, this time at Bombay, India, from September to November 1937 before returning to the Gulf.

In August 1938, Bideford started a more extensive refit at Malta Dockyard, where she was re-armed, this refit continuing until December 1938, when she returned to the Gulf. In May 1939, Bideford transferred to the China Station, based at Hong Kong.

Bideford was still part of the China Station on the outbreak of the Second World War in September 1939, continuing to carry out patrols until being ordered to return to Britain in December 1939. On her journey back to home waters, Bideford formed part of the escort of Convoy HGF 14 from Gibraltar to the UK, attacking a suspected submarine contact off Cape Finisterre on 9 January 1940. In February 1940, Bideford joined the 1st Escort Vessel Division of the Western Approaches Command, and was deployed on escorting convoys between Gibraltar and the United Kingdom. While escorting one such convoy, the Britain-bound HG 19, on 23 February, Bideford attacked another suspected submarine contact. She attacked another submarine contact on 18 March, while escorting Convoy OG 22F. In May 1940 she took part in the Dunkirk evacuation. On her first evacuation trip, on the evening of 29 May, Bideford was struck by a German bomb, which set off one of Bideford's depth charges, badly damaging the ship, and killing 28, 16 from the ship's crew and 12 passengers. The aft 40 feet (12 m) of the ship's stern was blown off and the ship's mainmast collapsed, with Bideford having to be grounded to avoid sinking. The minesweeper Kellett took off the surviving troops from Bideford, but despite the damage to the sloop, other troops later boarded Bideford. The Dragonfly-class river gunboat Locust towed Bideford back to Dover, the journey taking 32 hours and ending on 31 May.

In April 1941 Bideford returned to escorting convoys to and from Gibraltar after completing repairs. In August 1941, Bideford was part of the escort of the Freetown, Sierra Leone-bound Convoy OS.4, which came under attack by U-boats, with five merchant ships being sunk. She rescued 63 survivors of the torpedoed MV Edward Blyden on 3 September 1941. On the return journey, Bideford, together with the Banff-class sloops Gorleston and Lulworth, the corvette Gardenia and the Free French Aviso Commandant Duboc, formed the escort for Convoy SL 87 of 11 merchant ships. The convoy came under attack by four U-boats (U-107, U-68, U-103 and U-67). The escort was ineffective, being inexperienced and short of fuel (having not refuelled at Freetown), and failed to counter-attack against the German submarines. Seven merchant ships were sunk, with no U-boats lost or damaged. The captain of Gorleston, commander of the escort, was heavily criticised for his handling of the convoy, and did not command another escort group.

On 31 October 1942, Bideford rescued 31 survivors from the torpedoed MV Abosso. On 25 August 1943 while serving with the 40th Escort Group in the Bay of Biscay, Bideford was damaged by a Henschel Hs 293 guided missile launched by a Luftwaffe aircraft, from II.Gruppe/KG 100. After repair, Bideford joined the 41st Escort Group, escorting convoys to Freetown. In January 1944, Bideford transferred with the rest of the 41st Escort Group to the Mediterranean and in April that year joined the 50th Escort Group, also in the Mediterranean. Bideford returned to home waters in January 1945, being refitted at Devonport, and then re-joined the 41st Escort Group, which was now employed on escort duties in the Southwest Approaches operating from Devonport. These duties continued until the end of the war in Europe.

Bideford was laid up at Milford Haven on 8 June 1945, and was transferred to BISCO for disposal on 14 September 1949, with the ship being scrapped by D. V. Howells & Sons at Pembroke Dock. In September 1950, Howells were convicted of allowing fuel oil from the ship to pollute navigable waterways.

== Bibliography ==
- Blair, Clay (2000). Hitler's U-boat War: The Hunters 1939–1942. London: Cassell & Co. ISBN 0-304-35260-8.
- Campbell, N. J. M. (1980). "Great Britain (including Empire Forces)". In Chesneau, Roger (ed.). Conway's All the World's Fighting Ships 1922–1946. Greenwich, UK: Conway Maritime Press. pp. 2–85. ISBN 0-85177-146-7.
- Colledge, J. J.; Warlow, Ben (2006) [1969]. Ships of the Royal Navy: The Complete Record of All Fighting Ships of the Royal Navy from the 15th Century to the Present (3rd Rev ed.). London: Chatham Publishing. ISBN 978-1-86176-281-8. OCLC 67375475.
- Ford, Roger (2013). Germany's Secret Weapons of World War II. London, United Kingdom: Amber Books. ISBN 9781909160569.
- Hague, Arnold (1993). Sloops: A History of the 71 Sloops Built in Britain and Australia for the British, Australian and Indian Navies 1926–1946. Kendal, UK: World Ship Society. ISBN 0-905617-67-3.
- Rohwer, Jürgen; Hümmelchen, Gerhard (1992). Chronology of the War at Sea 1939–1945. London: Greenhill Books. ISBN 1-85367-117-7.
- Winser, John de S. (1999). B.E.F. Ships before, at and after Dunkirk. Gravesend, UK: World Ship Society. ISBN 0-905617-91-6.
