= Sergeant Siwash =

Duck in the United States Marine Corps

Siwash
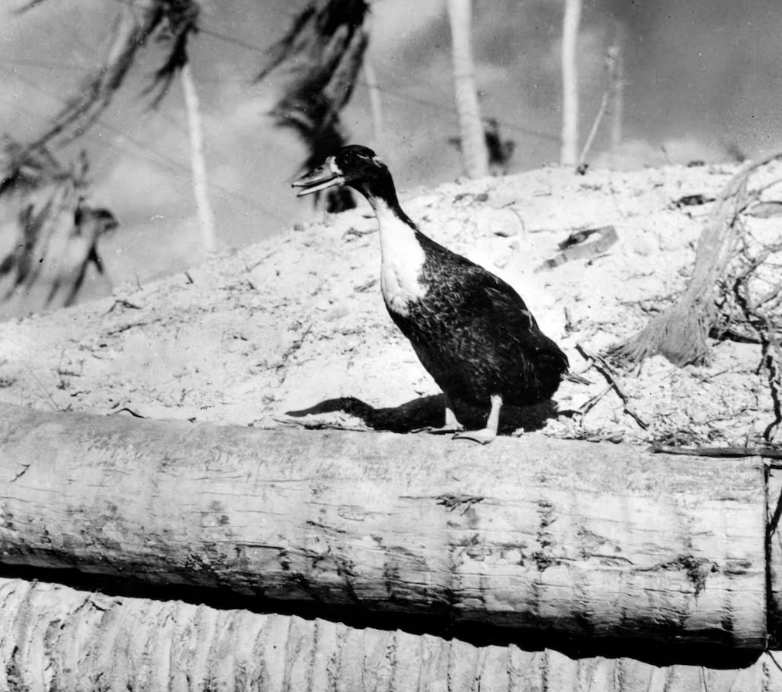
- Sergeant Siwash at the Battle of Tarawa, 1943
- Species: Domestic duck
- Sex: Female
- Hatched: New Zealand
- Died: May 22, 1954; Lincoln Park Zoo
- Cause of death: Liver disease
- Resting place: National Museum of the Marine Corps
- Employer: United States Marine Corps
- Title: Sergeant
- Owner: Francis Fagan
- Awards: Citation for bravery

Sergeant Siwash (died May 22, 1954) was a female domestic duck that served as a sergeant in the United States Marine Corps. She was owned by Francis Fagan and she fought in World War II, earning a citation for bravery for her actions at the Battle of Tarawa.

== Biography ==
Sergeant Siwash was a female duck that was named after a nickname for Sergeant Jack Cornelius. She was initially believed to be a male duck until she laid eggs.

Siwash was won at a raffle in New Zealand by Sergeant Francis Fagan. Siwash became the mascot of the 2nd Marine Division in June 1943. She was popular because she drank beer like her owner. She was noted to dislike draft beer, and only drank beer if it was warm, as it was served in New Zealand. Siwash was brought to the invasion of Tarawa, where she proceeded to find and attack a Japanese rooster, getting injured in the process. The Marines considered awarding her with a Purple Heart for this, but she was instead given a citation for bravery. Her citation read:

For courageous action and wounds received on Tarawa, in the Gilbert Islands, November 1943. With utter disregard for his (Note: Siwash was not yet known to be female at the time of her citation.) own personal safety, Siwash, upon reaching the beach, without hesitation engaged the enemy in fierce combat, namely, one rooster of Japanese ancestry, and though wounded on the head by repeated pecks, he soon routed the opposition. He refused medical aid until all wounded members of his section had been taken care of.

— Siwash's citation for bravery

She was also brought to the Battle of Saipan and the Battle of Tinian, where she captured a Japanese rooster.

After World War II, Siwash temporarily lived on a farm in California. She was later reenlisted to help recruit soldiers and sell war bonds during the Korean War. She was eventually relocated to the Lincoln Park Zoo, and died on May 22, 1954, due to liver disease. Marine veterans said that her liver disease had no connection to her fondness for beer. A funeral for Siwash was held in a taxidermy shop. Her body was stuffed and was presented to the National Museum of the Marine Corps in Triangle, Virginia.

== See also ==
- Judy (dog)
- Sergeant Reckless
- Wojtek (bear)
- Unsinkable Sam
