= SS Van Waerwijck =

Dutch cargo liner that became a Japanese hell ship

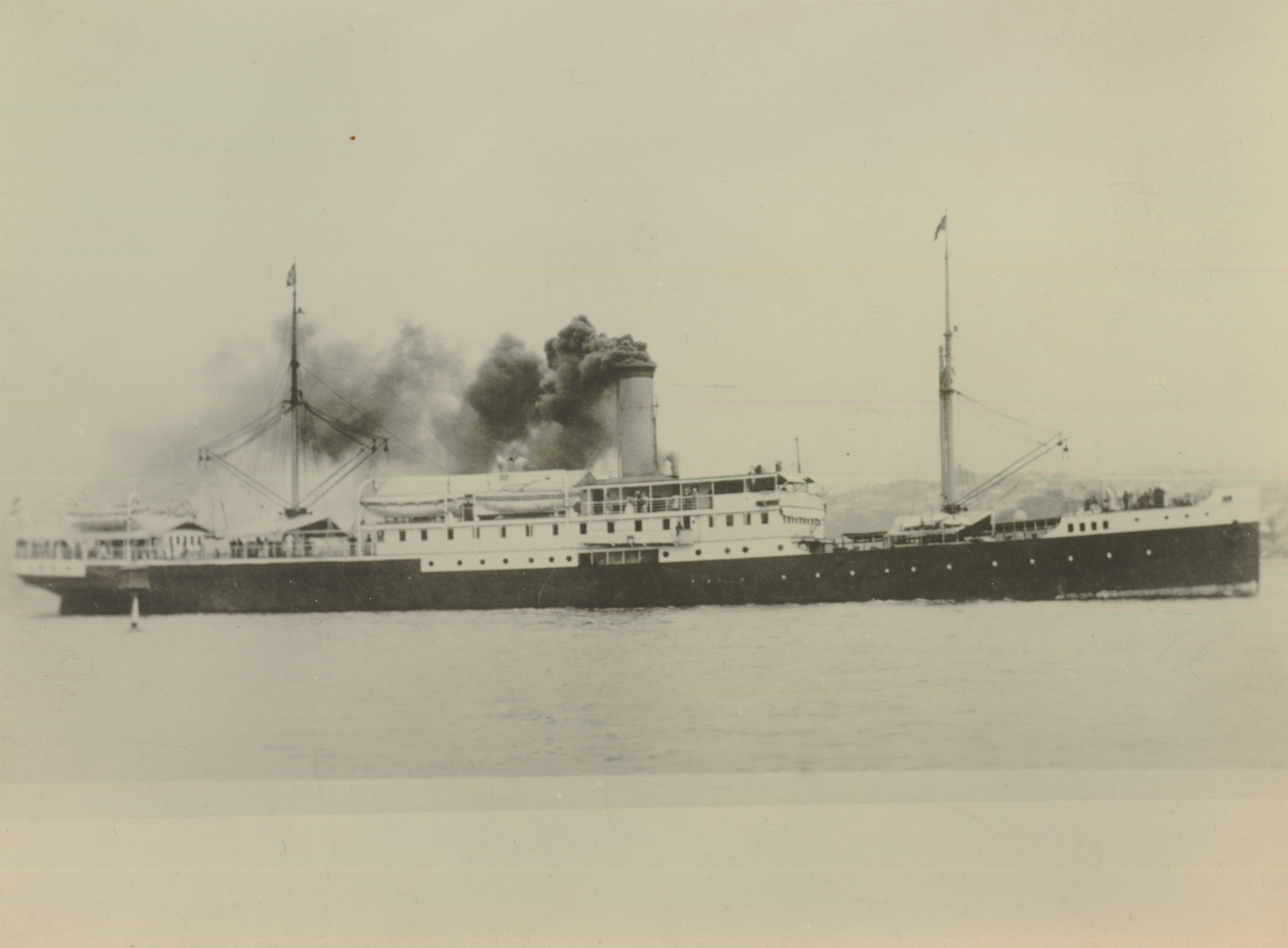
- Van Waerwijck under way

History
- Name: 1909: Van Waerwijck; 1942: Harugiku Maru
- Owner: 1910: Koninklijke Paketvaart-Mij; 1918: Shipping Controller; 1919: Koninklijke Paketvaart-Mij; 1942: Government of Japan
- Operator: 1918: Jardine Matheson & Co; 1942: Daido Kaiun
- Port of registry: 1910: (Netherlands) Batavia; 1918: (United Kingdom) Hong Kong; 1919: (Netherlands) Batavia; 1942: (Japan)
- Builder: Mij v S&W Fijenoord, Rotterdam
- Yard number: 228
- Launched: 9 December 1909
- Completed: February 1910
- Identification: 1907: code letters TJKD; 1918: UK official number 142209; 1918: code letters THMS; by 1926: code letters TJMK; by 1934: call sign PKHQ
- Fate: Sunk, 26 June 1944

General characteristics
- Type: Passenger ship
- Tonnage: 3,040 GRT, 1,906 NRT, 3,430 DWT
- Length: 325.3 ft (99.2 m)
- Beam: 44.0 ft (13.4 m)
- Depth: 22.8 ft (6.9 m)
- Decks: 2
- Installed power: 233 NHP, 1,300 ihp
- Propulsion: 1 × screw; 1 × triple-expansion engine
- Speed: 10 1/2 knots (19.4 km/h)
- Capacity: passengers: 31 × 1st class, 21 × 2nd class, 1,374 × steerage; cargo: 166,000 cubic feet (4,700 m^{3}) grain, 144,000 cubic feet (4,100 m^{3}) bale
- Notes: one of several sister ships

SS Van Waerwijck was a passenger steamship that was launched in the Netherlands in 1909 and sunk in the Strait of Malacca in 1944. She spent most of her career with Koninklijke Paketvaart-Maatschappij (KPM, the "Royal Parcel Navigation Company"), based in the Dutch East Indies.

In the First World War the United Kingdom seized her under angary. In the Second World War she was sunk as a blockship, but later raised by Japan, who repaired her and renamed her 治菊丸, transcribed into the Latin alphabet as Harugiku Maru. She became a hell ship. In 1944 she was carrying Allied prisoners of war when a Royal Navy submarine sank her, killing between 154 and 198 of the people aboard.

Some English language sources mis-spell the ship's Dutch name in various ways. The spelling that KPM recorded with Lloyd's Register is Van Waerwijck. Some Dutch or English language sources transcribe her Japanese name with other spellings, usually Harukiku Maru. Japanese sources use Harugiku Maru.

This is the first of two KPM ships called Van Waerwijck. The second was a motor ship that was built in 1954, sold in 1967 and scrapped in 1982.

== Building ==
Between 1907 and 1914, KPM took delivery of a set of sister ships from different Dutch shipyards. Maatschappij voor Scheeps- en Werktuigbouw Fijenoord in Rotterdam completed 's Jacob in 1907, Le Maire and Van Spilbergen in 1908, Van der Hagen in 1909, Van Waerwijck in 1910, and Sloet van de Beele and Van Imhoff in 1914. Nederlandsche Scheepsbouw Maatschappij in Amsterdam completed Van Heemskerk in 1909, Van Linschoten in 1910, and Van Neck in 1912. Rijkee & Co in Rotterdam completed Van Rees in 1913.

Fijenoord built Van Waerwijck as yard number 228. She was launched on 9 December 1909 and completed in February 1910. Her registered length was 325.3 ft (99.2 m), her beam was 44.0 ft (13.4 m) and her depth was 22.8 ft (6.9 m). Her tonnages were 3,040 GRT, 1,906 NRT, and 3,430 DWT. She had berths for 1,426 passengers: 31 in first class, 21 in second class, and 1,374 in steerage. Her holds had capacity for 166,000 cubic feet (4,700 m^{3}) of grain, or 144,000 cubic feet (4,100 m^{3}) of baled cargo.

The ship had a single screw, driven by a three-cylinder triple-expansion steam engine. It was rated at 233 NHP or 1,300 ihp, and gave her a speed of 10 1/2 knots (19.4 km/h).

KPM registered Van Waerwijck at Batavia in the Dutch East Indies. Her code letters were TJKD.

== Van Waerwijck ==
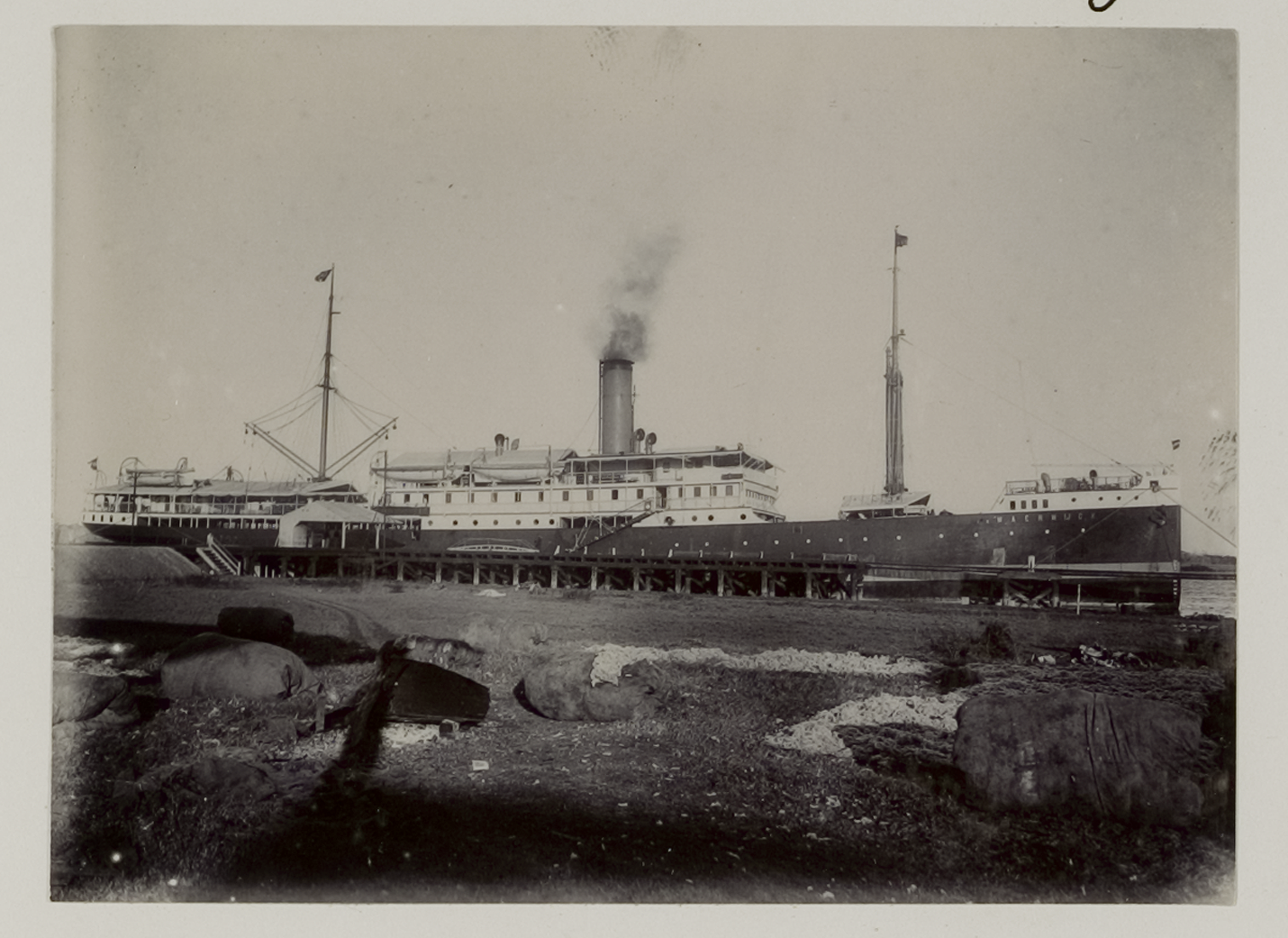
Van Waerwijck in the Dutch East Indies

On 20 March 1918 President Woodrow Wilson issued Proclamation 1436, authorising the seizure under angary of Dutch ships in US ports. The UK also seized Dutch ships in ports of the British Isles and the British Empire. Van Waerwijck was seized in Hong Kong. She was vested in the UK Shipping Controller, who appointed Jardine Matheson & Co to manage her. She was registered in Hong Kong, with the UK official number 142209 and code letters THMS. She was returned to Batavia and to her owners in February 1919.

By 1926 Van Waerwijck's code letters had been changed to TJMK. By 1934 her code letters were superseded by the call sign PKHQ.

On 8 December 1941 Japan invaded the Dutch East Indies. On 1 March 1942 Japanese forces landed on Java. The next day, Van Waerwijck's crew scuttled her in the harbour mouth of the Port of Tanjung Priok as a blockship.

== Harugiku Maru ==
The Japanese raised the ship in July 1942, repaired her, renamed her 治菊丸 (Harugiku Maru), and returned her to service. The Government of Japan appointed the Daido Kaiun shipping company (now part of Mitsui O.S.K. Lines) to manage her.

On 24 June 1944, Japanese trucks took several hundred Allied PoWs from Gloe Gloer prisoner-of-war camp on Sumatra to the Port of Belawan, where they were embarked on Harugiku Maru. She also carried a cargo of timber and rubber. The PoWs were being taken to Pekanbaru, to be forced labourers on the Pekanbaru Railway. The prisoners were crowded into some of the ship's holds. The next day, the ship left Belawan in a small convoy with a small number of merchant ships, escorted by one or more Imperial Japanese Navy ships, plus a twin-engined aircraft circling overhead. Sources differ as to the number and details of the other ships in the convoy, and the number of Allied PoWs aboard Harugiku Maru. The PoWs included Australian Army, British Army, Royal Air Force, Royal Navy, Merchant Navy and Dutch personnel. One source states that the soldiers guarding the PoWs were Korean. Groups of PoWs from the holds were allowed on deck in turns.

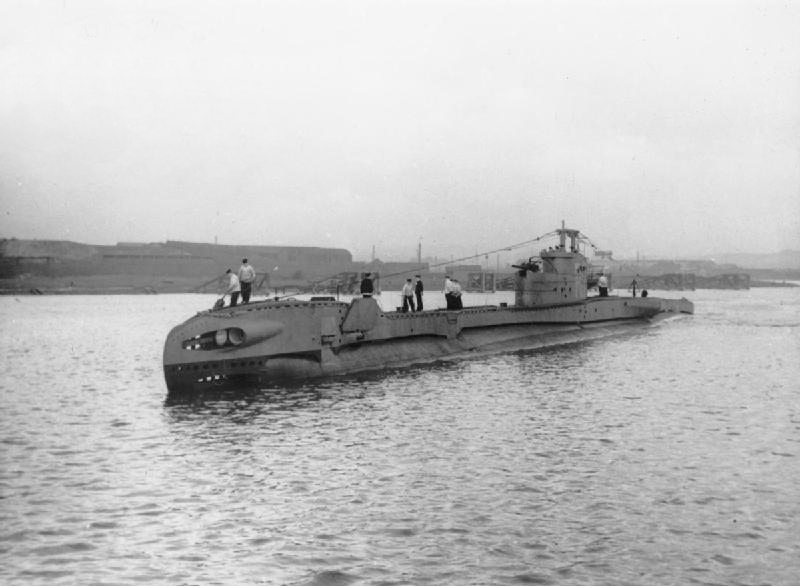
HMS Truculent

At 09:58 hrs on 26 June the Royal Navy submarine HMS Truculent sighted the convoy. The position is variously described as being off Tanjungbalai, or 60 nautical miles (110 km) or 100 nautical miles (190 km) southeast of Medan. At 11:12 hrs Harugiku Maru was at position 03°15′N 99°46′E when Truculent fired a spread of four torpedoes from a range of 3,500 yards (3,200 m). Two of them hit Harugiku Maru's port side. The ship listed to port and broke in two. Her crew managed to launch at least one of her lifeboats. The after part of the ship soon sank. The fore part drifted onto a sand bank, but with its holds flooded.

Truculent dived to the bottom of the sea at a depth of 58 feet (18 m). The naval escorts dropped depth charges at 11:16, 11:24 and 11:59 hrs, and then broke off the counter-attack. Truculent was undamaged.

Some of the PoWs who were in Harugiku Maru's holds were drowned. The majority managed to jump overboard, and some found wreckage to cling to. Some were in the water for three or four hours before being rescued. A tanker in the convoy rescued 540 survivors. On 28 June she landed them at Singapore, where they were taken to River Valley Road transit camp, Red River Camp, or Changi Prison. 22 of them died. Other survivors were landed on Sumatra.

Sources differ as to the number of dead and the number of survivors. The number of PoWs killed is variously cited as 154, 167, 176, 177, 178, or 198. 198 is also cited as the total number of victims. The number of PoWs who survived is variously cited as 553, 1,014, or 1,020.

== Judy ==
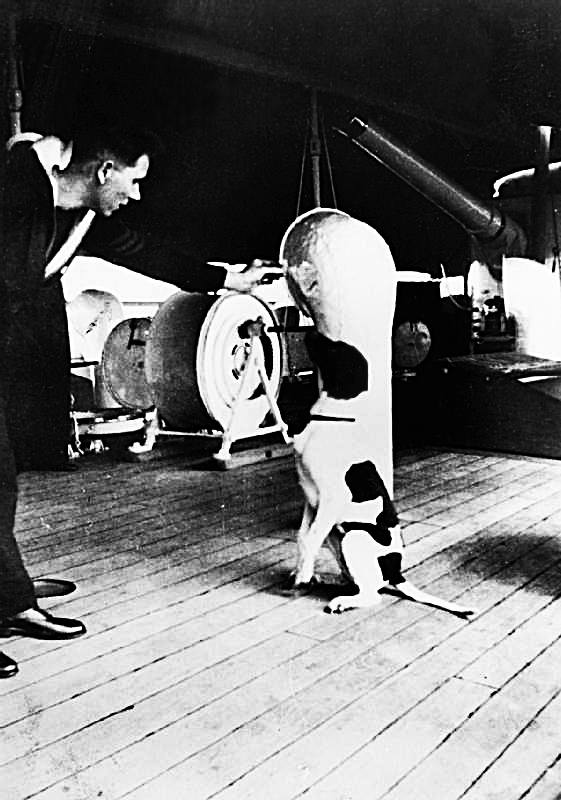
Judy aboard HMS Grasshopper

One of the PoWs embarked on Harugiku Maru, RAF Leading Aircraftman Frank Williams, smuggled a pointer dog aboard in a sack. Judy was a ship's dog who had survived the sinking of the gunboat HMS Grasshopper on 14 February 1942, and spent more than two years in a PoW camp at Medan.

As Harugiku Maru was sinking, Williams pushed Judy out of a porthole, and then separately made his own escape from the ship. Other survivors found Judy in the water, and she is said to have saved survivors in the water by pushing items of flotsam to them. She was rescued and taken with them to Sumatra, where she was reunited with Les Searle, a member of Grasshopper's crew. Judy survived the war, was awarded the Dickin Medal in 1946, and lived until 1950.

== Model ==
There is a model of Harugiku Maru in a museum on Sumatra.

== Bibliography ==
- Lloyd's Register of British and Foreign Shipping. Vol. II.–Steamers. London: Lloyd's Register of Shipping. 1911 – via Internet Archive.
- Lloyd's Register of Shipping. Vol. II.–Steamers and Motorships. London: Lloyd's Register. 1926 – via Internet Archive.
- Lloyd's Register of Shipping (PDF). Vol. II.–Steamers and Motorships of 300 Tons Gross and Over. London: Lloyd's Register of Shipping. 1934 – via Southampton City Council.
- Mercantile Navy List. London. 1919 – via Crew List Index Project.
- Varley, Edwin (1973). James, Wendy (ed.). The Judy Story: The Dog with Six Lives. London: Souvenir Press Ltd. ISBN 978-0-285-62121-3.

Media related to Van Waerwijck (ship, 1910) at Wikimedia Commons
