= Dragonfly-class gunboat =

Class of river gunboats

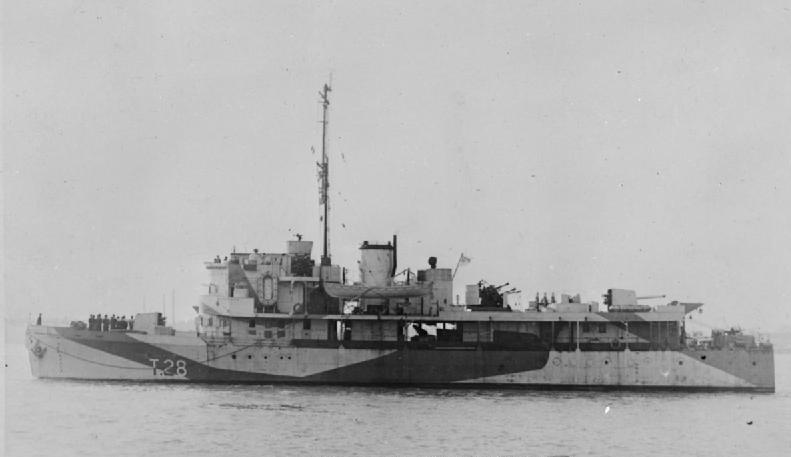
- HMS Locust

Class overview
- Name: Dragonfly class
- Builders: Vosper Thornycroft, Yarrow Shipbuilders, J S White
- Operators: Royal Navy
- Subclasses: HMS Scorpion
- Built: 1937-1938
- In commission: 1938-1968
- Planned: 6
- Completed: 5
- Canceled: 1
- Lost: 4
- Retired: 1
- Scrapped: 1

General characteristics
- Type: River gunboat
- Displacement: 585 long tons (594 t)
- Length: 197 ft (60 m)
- Beam: 33 ft (10 m)
- Draught: 5 ft (1.5 m)
- Installed power: 2 Admiralty 3-drum boilers; 3,800 shp (2,800 kW)
- Propulsion: 2 shafts; 2 geared steam turbines
- Speed: 17 knots (31 km/h; 20 mph)
- Complement: 74
- Armament: 2 × single 4 in (102 mm) guns; 1 × single 3.7 in (94 mm) Mark V howitzer; 8 × machine guns

The Dragonfly class was a class of twin shaft river gunboats of the Royal Navy. Six were planned and five were built: of those five, four were lost in the Second World War. One of the four was HMS Scorpion, a slightly upgunned and better powered version.

== Ships ==
Ship name	Laid down	Completed	Fate	Notes
Dragonfly	December 1937	June 1939	Lost in the Banka Strait, 14 February 1942.	
Grasshopper	December 1937	June 1939	Lost in the Banka Strait, 14 February 1942.	
Locust	November 1938	May 1940	Sold for scrap, 1968	A quadruple 2-pound "pompom" gun was fitted instead of the 3.7 (94 mm) howitzer. Later refitted with 3 20 mm guns and 20 depth charges. became a headquarters ship in 1944.
Mosquito	December 1938	April 1940	Lost off Dunkirk, 1 June 1940	A quadruple 2-pound "pompom" gun was fitted instead of the 3.7 (94 mm) howitzer.
Scorpion	1937	November 1938	Lost in the Banka Strait, 13 February 1942.	Was an upgunned variant of the class
Bee	n/a	n/a	Cancelled, March 1940	
