= Sergeant Reckless =

U.S. Marine pack horse and Dickin Medal recipient

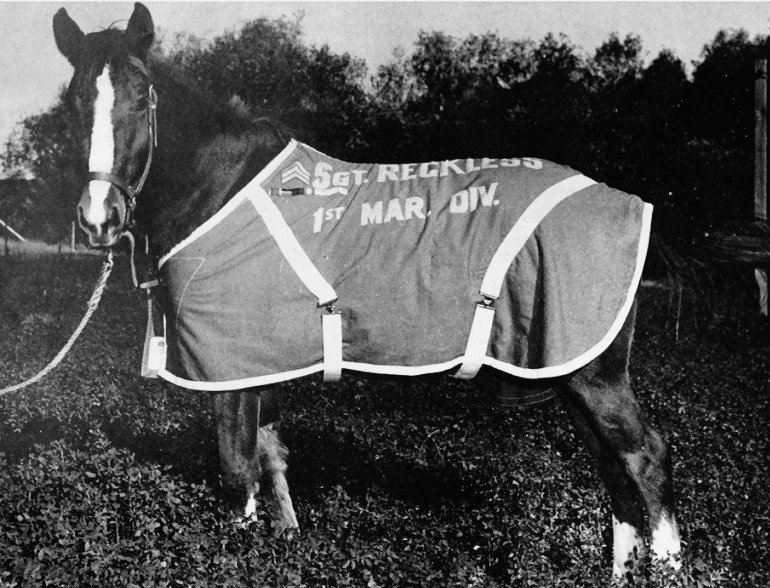
- Sergeant Reckless in retirement
- Breed: Mongolian
- Discipline: Pack horse
- Sex: Female
- Foaled: c. 1948
- Died: May 13, 1968
- Country: South Korea
- Color: Chestnut
- Owner: Kim Huk Moon; United States Marine Corps
- Military career
- Children: 4
- Allegiance: United States
- Branch: United States Marine Corps
- Service years: 1952–1960
- Rank: Staff sergeant
- Conflicts: Battle for Outpost Vegas
- Awards: Dickin Medal; Purple Heart (2); Navy Presidential Unit Citation (2); Navy Unit Commendation; Marine Corps Good Conduct Medal; National Defense Service Medal; Korean Service Medal (4); United Nations Korea Medal; Animals in War & Peace Medal of Bravery
- Last updated on: April 4, 2020.

Sergeant Reckless (c. 1948 – May 13, 1968), a decorated warhorse who held official rank in the United States military, was a mare of Mongolian horse breeding. Out of a racehorse dam, (Note: a female horse used in horse breeding) she was purchased in October 1952 for $250 (equivalent to $3,000 in 2025) from a South Korean stableboy at the Seoul racetrack who needed money to buy an artificial leg for his sister. Reckless was bought by members of the United States Marine Corps and trained to be a pack horse for the Recoilless Rifle Platoon, Anti-Tank Company, 5th Marine Regiment, 1st Marine Division. She quickly became part of the unit and was allowed to roam freely through camp, entering the Marines' tents, where she would sleep on cold nights, and was known for her willingness to eat nearly anything, including scrambled eggs, beer, cola, and, once, about $30 worth of poker chips.

She served in numerous combat actions during the Korean War, carrying supplies and ammunition, and was also used to evacuate wounded. Learning each supply route after only a couple of trips, she often traveled to deliver supplies to the troops on her own, without benefit of a handler. The highlight of her nine-month military career came in late March 1953 during the Battle for Outpost Vegas when, in a single day, she made 51 solo trips to resupply multiple front line units. She was wounded in combat twice and was given the battlefield rank of corporal in 1953 and then a battlefield promotion to sergeant in 1954, several months after the war ended. She also became the first horse known to have participated in an amphibious landing. Following the war, she was awarded two Purple Hearts and the Marine Corps Good Conduct Medal. Her unit received Presidential Unit Citations from both the United States and South Korea, a United Nations Service Medal Korea and she received several other military honors.

Her wartime service record was featured in The Saturday Evening Post, and LIFE magazine recognized her as one of America's 100 all-time heroes. She was retired and brought to the United States after the war, where she made appearances on television and participated in the United States Marine Corps birthday ball. She was officially promoted to staff sergeant in 1959 by the Commandant of the Marine Corps. She gave birth to four foals in the U.S., and died in May 1968. A plaque and photo were dedicated in her honor at the Marine Corps Base Camp Pendleton stables and a statue of her was dedicated on July 26, 2013, at the National Museum of the Marine Corps in Quantico, Virginia. On May 12, 2018, a bronze statue of Sergeant Reckless was placed and dedicated in the Kentucky Horse Park, Lexington Kentucky.

== Origins ==
Sergeant Reckless was chestnut colored with a blaze and three white stockings. Her date of birth and parentage are unconfirmed, but she was estimated to be around three or four years old when she was purchased by members of the United States Marine Corps in October 1952. She was sold to the Marines by her owner, a young Korean stableboy called Kim Huk-moon (김혁문 or 김흑문), though that was not his real name. The horse was known as originally named "아침해" (Ah Chim Hae, Korean pronunciation: [atɕʰimhɛ]) in Korean, which translates to "Morning Sun" or "Sun-of-the-Morning", also known as "여명" (Yeo Myeong) in Korean, which translates to "light of dawn", "Morning Flame" or "Flame-of-the-Morning" also reputed to be the name of her dam, a racehorse at the track in Seoul. Kim Huk-moon sold the horse, whom he had nicknamed "Flame", to Lieutenant Eric Pedersen, (Note: Sometimes misspelled as "Pederson") son of arms designer John D. Pedersen. The $250 price was needed to buy a leg prosthesis for his sister, who had stepped on a land mine. The horse's breeding was thought to be primarily Mongolian though she did have some features, particularly the shape of her head, that were similar to horses of Thoroughbred lineage. She was small, standing only 14 hands (56 inches, 142 cm) and weighing 900 pounds (410 kg).

== Military service ==
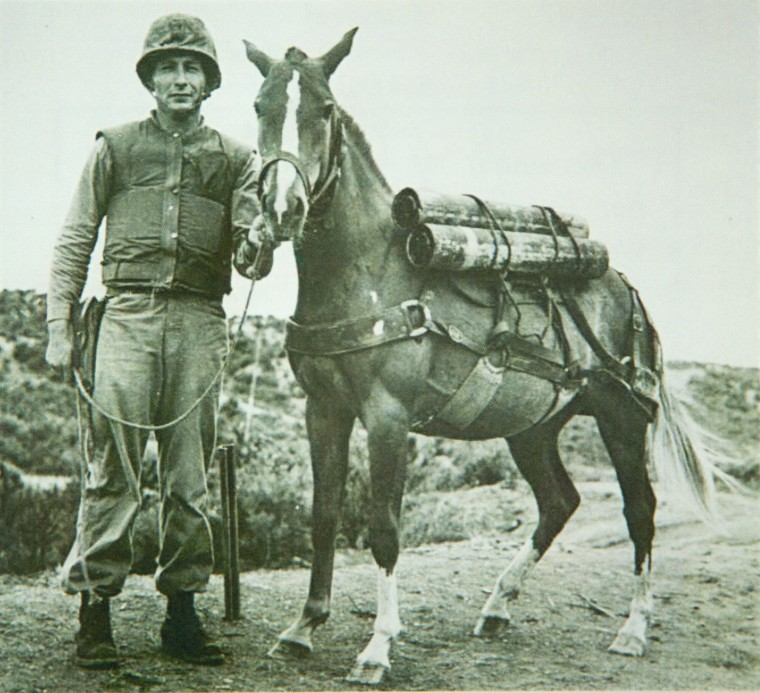
Reckless with her primary trainer, Platoon Gunnery Sergeant Joseph Latham

In October 1952, Pedersen received permission from Colonel Eustace P. Smoak to purchase a horse for his platoon. Based in mountainous terrain, Pedersen needed a pack animal capable of carrying up to nine of the heavy 24-pound shells needed to supply the recoilless rifles used by his unit, the Recoilless Rifle Platoon of the 5th Marine Regiment. The day after he received permission, on October 26, 1952, Pedersen, Sergeant Willard Berry, and Corporal Philip Carter drove a jeep with a trailer to the Seoul racetrack. Pedersen paid for the horse with his own money. Moon was reluctant to sell the horse, though he needed to, and cried when "Flame" departed. The Marines renamed her "Reckless" as a contraction of the name of the Recoilless rifle and a nod to the daredevil attitude associated with those who used the gun.

Her primary trainer and the person Reckless was closest to was platoon Gunnery Sergeant Joseph Latham. Private First Class Monroe Coleman was her primary caretaker. In addition to Pedersen, Latham, and Coleman, Lieutenant Bill Riley and Sergeant Elmer Lively were also involved with the training and care of Reckless. Pedersen had his wife ship a pack saddle from their home in California so Reckless could better fulfill her primary role as a pack animal. The recoilless rifle platoon had its own medical corpsman, Navy Hospitalman First Class George "Doc" Mitchell, who provided the majority of medical care for Reckless.

The Marines, especially Latham, taught Reckless battlefield survival skills such as how not to become entangled in barbed wire and to lie down when under fire. She learned to run for a bunker upon hearing the cry, "incoming!" The platoon called it her "hoof training" and "hoof camp". The horse was initially kept in a pasture near the encampment. Reckless had a gentle disposition and soon developed such a rapport with the troops that she was allowed to freely roam about the camp and entered tents at will, sometimes sleeping inside with the troops, and even lying down next to Latham's warm tent stove on cold nights. She was fond of a wide variety of foodstuffs, entertaining the platoon by eating scrambled eggs and drinking Coca-Cola and beer. Food could not be left unattended around her. She was known to eat bacon, buttered toast, chocolate bars, hard candy, shredded wheat, peanut butter sandwiches and mashed potatoes. However, Mitchell advised the platoon that she not be given more than two bottles of Coke a day. Her tastes were not confined to foodstuffs; she once ate her horse blanket, and on another occasion ate $30 worth of Latham's winning poker chips.

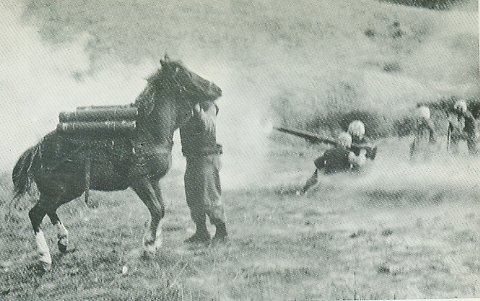
Reckless under fire in Korea

Reckless's baptism under fire came at a place called Hedley's Crotch, near the villages of Changdan and Kwakchan. Though loaded down with six recoilless rifle shells, she initially "went straight up" and all four feet left the ground the first time the Recoilless Rifle was fired. When she landed she started shaking, but Coleman, her handler, calmed her down. The second time the gun fired she merely snorted, and by the end of the mission that day appeared calm and was seen trying to eat a discarded helmet liner. She even appeared to take an interest in the operation of the weapon. When learning a new delivery route, Reckless would only need someone to lead her a few times. Afterwards she would make the trips on her own. There was a standing order not to ride Reckless, but in early December 1952, someone violated that order and took Reckless on a ride that included a sprint through a minefield. She was not injured during the unauthorized ride.

Her most significant accomplishment came during the Battle of Panmunjom-Vegas (also known as the Battle of Outpost Vegas/Vegas Hill) over the period March 26–28, 1953, when she made 51 solo trips in a single day, carrying a total of 386 recoilless rounds (over 9,000 pounds, carrying four to eight 24-pound shells on each trip) covering over 35 miles that day. The whole Battle of Vegas lasted 3 days. (Note: Sometimes erroneously reported as 5 days.) She was wounded twice during the battle: once when she was hit by shrapnel over the left eye and another time on her left flank. For her accomplishments during the Battle of Vegas Hill, Reckless was promoted to corporal.

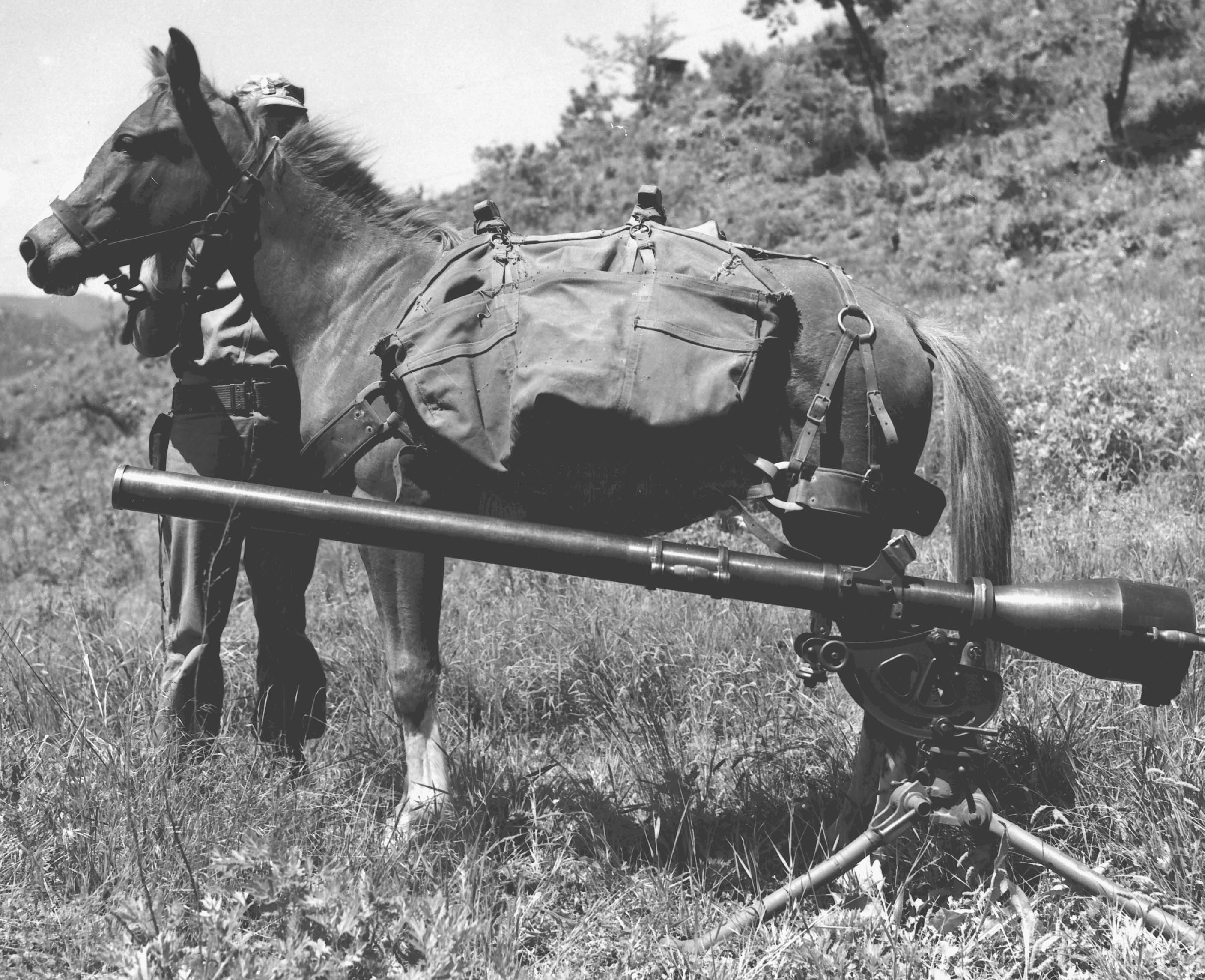
Reckless beside a 75 mm recoilless rifle

When not on the front lines, Reckless packed other items for the platoon, and was particularly useful for stringing telephone wire. Carrying reels of wire on her pack that were played out as she walked, she could string as much wire as twelve men on foot. She became the first horse in the Marine Corps known to have participated in an amphibious landing when the 5th moved from Camp Casey to Inchon, planning to participate in amphibious landings hundreds of miles south of Inchon. The commanding officer of the transport halted loading operations when he saw the platoon on the dock with Reckless. He refused to take her on board his clean ship, which had won an award for being the cleanest ship in the previous two years. She was allowed on board after the Marines produced the loading plan, approved by him, which specifically listed Reckless and her equipment. Once the ship was underway, she became sick, making a mess on the ship's deck during the first part of the voyage. She could not be disembarked due to a storm, but soon became accustomed to the motion of the ship at sea and had no more problems. The 1st Marine Division was moved to a rest area soon after the move, and while there some platoon members posed with Reckless and a sign challenging the Thoroughbred Native Dancer to a race. They called their race the "Paddy Derby", the field "Upsan Downs", and the conditions differed from a typical horse race: 1.5 miles over paddies and hills, carrying 192 pounds of ammunition, and no riders. The Marines never received a reply; Native Dancer came in second in the Kentucky Derby, and went on to win the Preakness Stakes and Belmont Stakes.

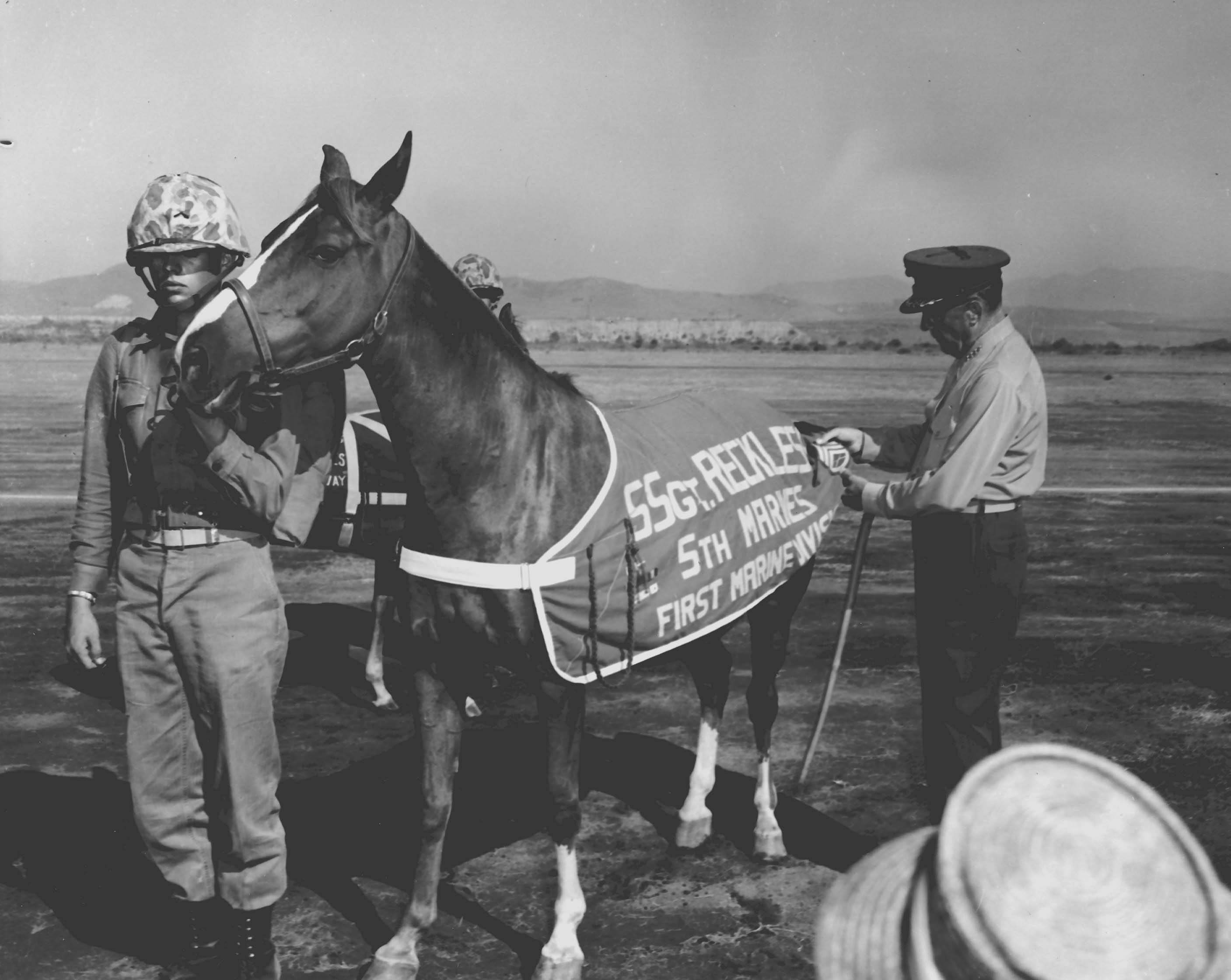
Sergeant Reckless at her promotion to Staff Sergeant, 1959

General Randolph M. Pate, then the commander of the 1st Marine Division, gave Reckless a battlefield promotion from corporal to sergeant in a formal ceremony, complete with reviewing stand, on April 10, 1954, several months after the war ended. She was also given a red and gold blanket with insignia. Reckless was promoted again, to staff sergeant (E-6), on August 31, 1959, at Camp Pendleton, California. This promotion was also awarded by Pate, then the Commandant of the Marine Corps. Pate personally presided over the ceremony, and Reckless was honored with a 19-gun salute and a 1,700-man parade of Marines from her wartime unit. She was an early example of an animal holding official rank in a branch of the United States military.

== Retirement ==
For her exemplary service to the Marine Corps, Reckless was awarded two Purple Hearts (for the wounds received during the Battle of Vegas), a Marine Corps Good Conduct Medal, a Presidential Unit Citation with bronze star, the National Defense Service Medal, a Korean Service Medal, the United Nations Korea Medal, a Navy Unit Commendation, and a Republic of Korea Presidential Unit Citation. She would wear these awards on her horse blanket, plus a French Fourragere that the 5th Marines earned in World War I.

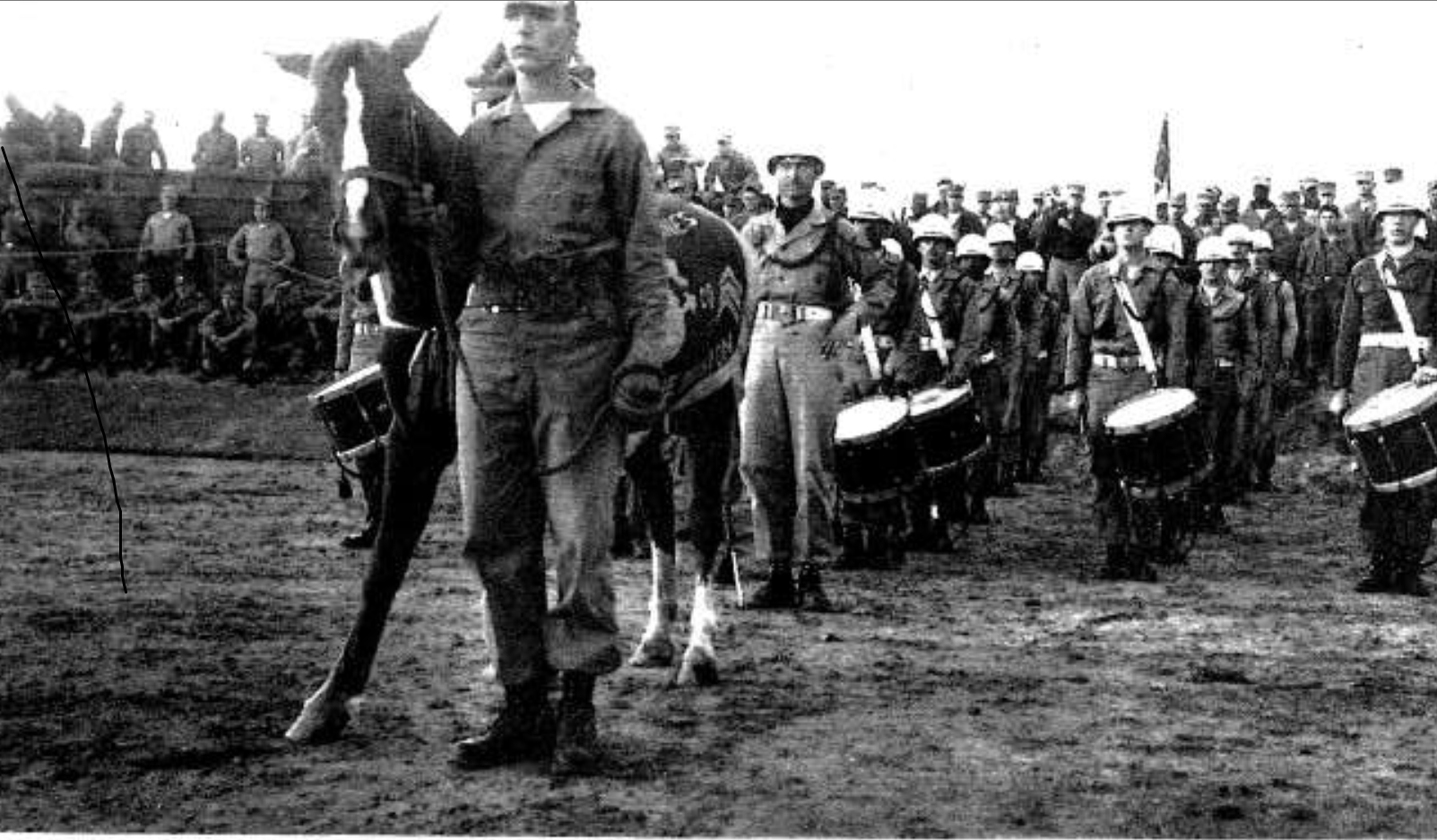
Sergeant Reckless at her stateside rotation ceremony, 1954. PFC William Moore is holding her. He accompanied her on the trip to America.

An article in The Saturday Evening Post, published on April 17, 1954, while Reckless was still in Korea, resulted in a campaign by American supporters to get the Marines to bring her to the United States. An executive at Pacific Transport Lines, Stan Coppel, read the article and offered to let Reckless ride free on one of his company's ships from Yokohama to San Francisco. Prior to her departure for America, a ceremony, including a band, for Reckless' rotation to the United States was held during half time of a football game between the Marine Corps and Army. Reckless left Korea for Japan aboard a 1st Marine Aircraft Wing transport plane. She then sailed from Yokohama on October 22 aboard the SS Pacific Transport, due in San Francisco on November 5, 1954. A typhoon delayed the ship's arrival until the evening of November 9. Reckless and her caretakers stayed aboard until the next morning. Reckless got sick during the storm and was once knocked out of her stall onto the deck by the storm, which happened near the end of the trip.

I was surprised at her beauty and intelligence, and believe it or not, her esprit de corps. Like any other Marine, she was enjoying a bottle of beer with her comrades. She was constantly the center of attraction and was fully aware of her importance. If she failed to receive the attention she felt her due, she would deliberately walk into a group of Marines and, in effect, enter the conversation. It was obvious the Marines loved her.

— Lieutenant General Randolph McC. Pate

Reckless's entry into the United States was not without its challenges. The Customs Bureau was not much of a problem but the United States Department of Agriculture insisted a medical check and lab tests be completed before she disembarked from the ship once it reached San Francisco, which would make her late for the Marine banquet where she was to be the guest of honor. The Marines contacted Agriculture Department officials in Washington, D.C., who agreed to allow her off the ship after her blood was drawn for lab tests, with the understanding that if she had glanders or dourine, she would be destroyed or sent back to Japan. Many of the Marines who actually knew her were incensed at what they considered an affront to her honor when they learned that dourine was an equine sexually transmitted disease. The night before she arrived, she once again ate her blanket, but a new one with ribbons and insignia was made just in time for her disembarkation. She was led off the ship by Lieutenant Pedersen and set foot on American soil in San Francisco on November 10, 1954, coincidentally the anniversary of the creation of the Marine Corps. For the Marine Corps Birthday Ball held that day, she rode an elevator, and then ate both cake and the flower decorations.

Reckless was kept by Pedersen's family for a brief time before moving to a more permanent home with the 5th Marines, 1st Marine Division at Camp Pendleton. A second article about Reckless appeared in The Saturday Evening Post on October 22, 1955. These two articles and the book Reckless: Pride of the Marines (1955) were written by the commander of the 2nd Battalion, Lieutenant Colonel Andrew Geer, who kept notes about Reckless during the war. She made several public appearances, including Art Linkletter's show House Party, but had to cancel an appearance on The Ed Sullivan Show due to the typhoon. Ed Sullivan had wanted her to appear on his November 7 show and was willing to pay the costs to get her there right after the scheduled, and delayed, November 5 arrival. Reckless never did appear on Sullivan's show.

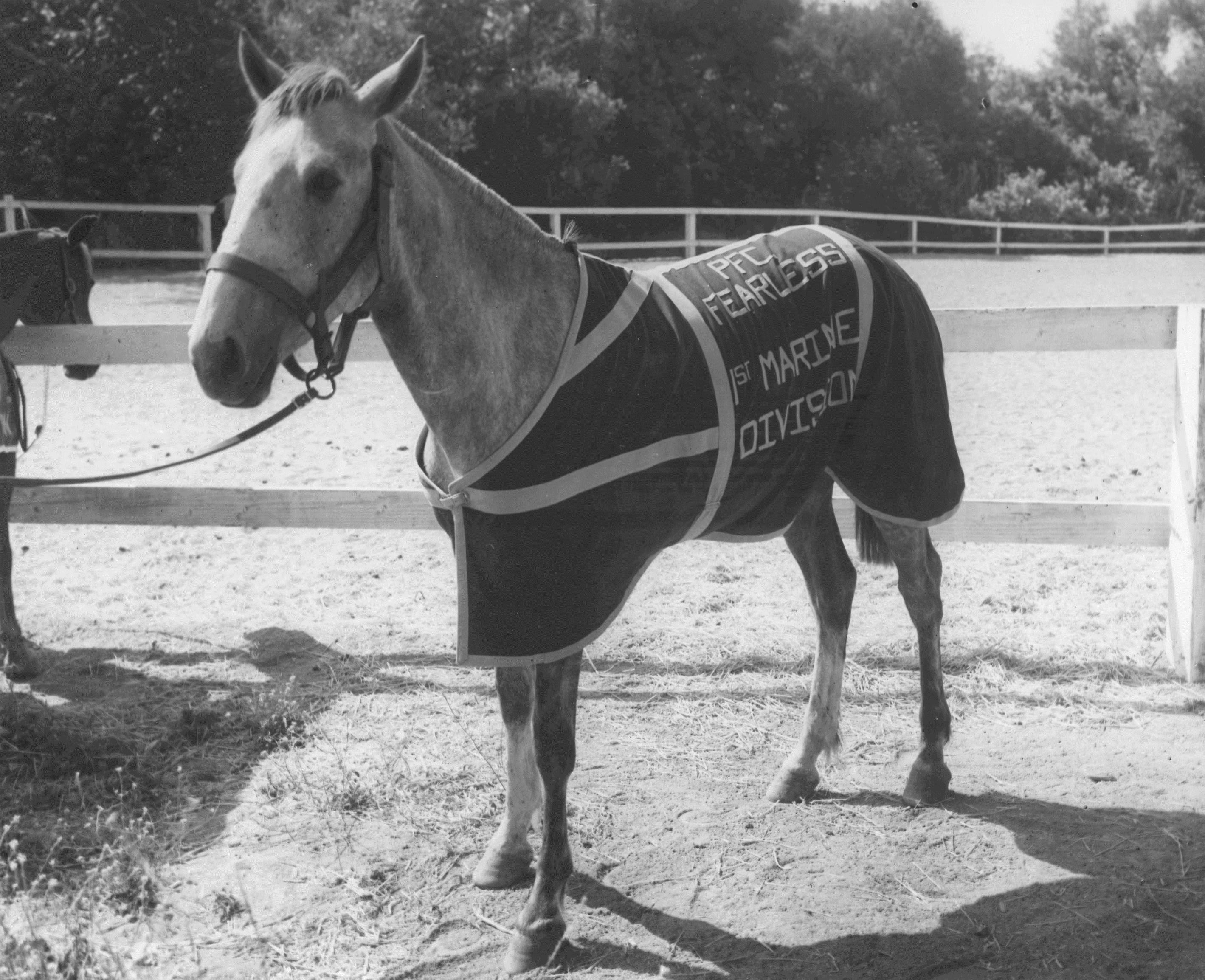
Reckless's son, Fearless, in 1959

Reckless was well cared for and treated as a VIP during her time at Camp Pendleton. The Marine Corps was also careful not to allow her to be exploited by commercial interests. She produced four foals there: colts Fearless (1957), Dauntless (1959), and Chesty (1964); her last foal, a filly born circa 1965–1966, died a month after birth and was unnamed. Her offspring Chesty was named after Chesty Puller, one of the few Marines ever allowed to ride Reckless. Puller was a Marine Corps lieutenant general and the most decorated United States Marine of all time. Reckless retired from active service with full military honors at Camp Pendleton on November 10, 1960. She was provided free quarters and feed in lieu of retirement pay, per Marine Corps documents.

Reckless developed arthritis in her back as she aged and injured herself on May 13, 1968, by falling into a barbed wire fence. She died under sedation while her wounds were being treated. At the time of her death, she was estimated to be 19 or 20 years old. There is a plaque and photo commemorating her at the Camp Pendleton stables. The first race at Aqueduct racetrack, New York, was designated "The Sgt Reckless" on November 10, 1989. In 1997, Reckless was listed by LIFE magazine as one of America's 100 all-time heroes.

== Monuments ==
A monument by sculptor Jocelyn Russell of Reckless carrying ammunition shells and other combat equipment was unveiled on July 26, 2013, in Semper Fidelis Memorial Park at the National Museum of the Marine Corps, one day before the 60th anniversary of the Korean War. There is a lock of her tail hair in the base of the statue. The statue's plaque includes a quote from Sergeant Harold Wadley, who served in battle alongside Sergeant Reckless: "The spirit of her loneliness and her loyalty, in spite of the danger, was something else to behold. Hurting. Determined. And alone. That's the image I have imprinted in my head and heart forever."

There are five additional monuments to Sergeant Reckless around the country by artist Jocelyn Russell: Marine Corps Base Camp Pendleton, Oceanside, California (October 26, 2016); Kentucky Horse Park, Lexington, Kentucky (May 12, 2018); National Cowgirl Museum and Hall of Fame, Ft. Worth, Texas (November 13, 2019), Barrington Hills Farm, Barrington Hills, Illinois (September 2019); and the World Equestrian Center, Ocala, Florida (December 2020). They are similar to the one located at the National Museum of the Marine Corps.

A memorial to Sergeant Reckless at Yeoncheon Gorangpogu History Park (Near Battlefield of Outpost Vegas Battle) was dedicated in 2018.

== Awards and decorations ==

Purple Heart w/1 award star	Navy Presidential Unit Citation w/1 service star	Navy Unit Commendation	Marine Corps Good Conduct Medal	French Fourragère
National Defense Service Medal	Korean Service Medal w/3 bronze service stars	Korean War Service Medal (Note: Kind of service medal: Unknown)	United Nations Korea Medal	French Fourragère

On July 28, 2016, Sergeant Reckless was posthumously awarded the Dickin Medal for her service between 1952 and 1953. In November 2019 she became the first recipient of the new American equivalent of the Dickin Medal, the Animals in War & Peace Medal of Bravery.

== In popular culture ==
- Reckless 1953: Horse Musical Show by Korea Racing Authority.
- Brooklyn Nine-Nine: Sergeant Peanut Butter from S01E13 is inspired by Reckless.

== See also ==
- Horses in warfare
- List of historical horses
- Judy (dog)
- Sergeant Siwash
- Wojtek (bear)
- Unsinkable Sam

== Bibliography ==
- Bartel, Bill (July 27, 2013). "Marines Honor Equine Comrade From Korean War". The Virginian Pilot. Archived from the original on December 26, 2014.
- Blackman, Robert R. Jr. (Fall–Winter 2012). "President's Notes" (PDF). Sentinel. Marine Corps Heritage Foundation. Archived from the original (PDF) on October 10, 2013.
- Coakley, Lesli (September 1991). "The four-legged Marine in Korea". Marines. 20 (9). hdl:2027/uiug.30112105114984.
- Geer, Andrew (1955). Reckless, Pride of the Marines. New York: E. P. Dutton. hdl:2027/mdp.39015003928499. OCLC 1658997.
- Hoffman, Nancy Lee White (November 1992). "Sgt Reckless: Combat Veteran". Leatherneck Magazine. 75 (11). Archived from the original on November 28, 2016.
- Kilgannon, Corey (November 9, 2012). "Remembering a Beloved Horse and Decorated Marine". The New York Times.
- Litalien, Dennis (1984). "Reckless Earns Place in Marine Corps History". Marines. 13 (6). hdl:2027/uiug.30112105112913.
- Miller, Joshua Rhett (July 25, 2013). "Statue of Korean War Horse Reckless to be Unveiled at Marine museum in Virginia". Fox News. Archived from the original on July 25, 2013.
- Staff (November 12, 2012). "Hoofed Heroine Sgt. Reckless". The Equestrian News. Archived from the original on December 26, 2014.
- Staff (2013). "Native Dancer (1950–1967)". The Baltimore Sun. Archived from the original on June 14, 2020.
- Staff (May 21, 1968). "Sgt Reckless Dies; Heroic Marine Mare". The Tuscaloosa News.
- Staff (April 10, 2013). "Ultimate Marine (Puller vs Butler)". Marine Corps News. Archived from the original on July 31, 2013.
- Sgt Reckless — Korean War Horse Hero. sgtreckless.com. August 8, 2010. Event occurs at 0:39–1:29, 2:19–2:45 – via Marine Corps Archives.
