= HMS Gnat (T60) =

Insect class gunboat of the Royal Navy

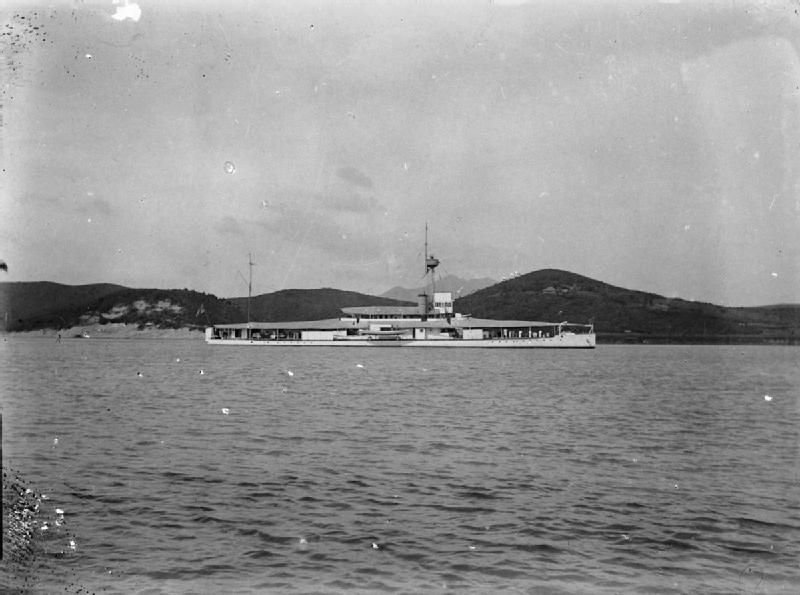
- HMS Gnat at China Station 1922

History

United Kingdom
- Name: HMS Gnat
- Builder: Lobnitz
- Launched: 3 December 1915
- Identification: Pennant number: T60
- Fate: Constructive total loss, scrapped 1945

General characteristics
- Class & type: Insect-class gunboat
- Displacement: 625 long tons (635 t)
- Length: 237 ft 6 in (72.39 m)
- Beam: 36 ft (11 m)
- Draught: 4 ft (1.2 m)
- Propulsion: 2 shaft VTE engines, 2 Yarrow type mixed firing boilers 2,000 ihp (1,500 kW)
- Speed: 14 knots (26 km/h; 16 mph)
- Complement: 55
- Armament: As built: 2 × BL 6-inch Mk VII guns; 2 × 12-pounder guns; 6 × .303-inch Maxim machine guns; Variations: 1 × QF 2-pounder "Pom-Pom"; 1 × QF 3-inch anti-aircraft gun; .303-inch Lewis machine gun; Oerlikon 20 mm cannon
- Armour: Improvised

HMS Gnat was a Royal Navy Insect-class gunboat. She was built by Lobnitz and launched in 1915. Gnat saw service during the First World War as part of a flotilla operating on the Tigris and Euphrates rivers. After the war, the vessel was transferred to China, where in 1927, Gnat took part in the Nanking Incident. Gnat began the Second World War still in China, but was towed to the Mediterranean Sea in 1940. There, the gunboat took part in an assault on Tobruk before being torpedoed by a German submarine. Gnat did not sink, and was beached at Alexandria, Egypt where the vessel was used as an anti-aircraft platform. The vessel was declared a constructive total loss and scrapped in 1945.

== History ==
During the First World War, Gnat took part in the Mesopotamian Campaign as part of the gunboat squadron operating on the Euphrates and Tigris rivers. In 1927 Gnat participated as part of a Royal Navy flotilla in the Nanking Incident, helping to protect British and other international citizens and business interests in China.

From 1936, Gnat had a "ship's dog", a pure-bred liver and white Pointer called Judy.

During the Second World War, Gnat was part of the China Station until 1940, when she was relieved by HMS Grasshopper. She then transferred to the Mediterranean Fleet's Inshore Squadron. Along with Stuart, Vampire, Voyager and Terror, she supported the 6th Australian Division's assault on Tobruk on 21 January 1941 with the port being secured the following day. She was torpedoed on 21 October 1941 by the German submarine U-79 but did not sink was towed and beached at Alexandria and used as a fixed Anti-aircraft platform.

Declared a constructive total loss, she was finally scrapped in 1945.

== Bibliography ==
- Lenton, H. T.; Colledge, J. J. (1973). Warships of World War II. Ian Allan Ltd. ISBN 978-0711004030.
- Lind, L. J.; Payne, A. (1976). Scrap Iron Destroyers; The story of HMA Ships Stuart, Vampire, Vendetta, Voyager and Waterhen. Garden Island: The Naval Historical Society of Australia. ISBN 0909153043.
