= HMS Grasshopper (T85) =

British Dragonfly-class river gunboat

Coordinates: 00°23.3′S 104°9.8′E

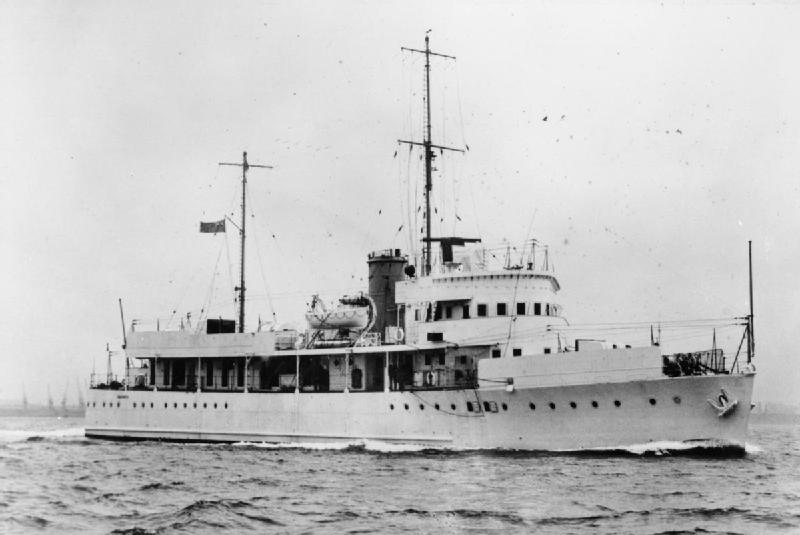
- Grasshopper at the China Station

History

United Kingdom
- Name: HMS Grasshopper
- Namesake: Grasshopper
- Ordered: 9 August 1937
- Builder: John I. Thornycroft & Company, Woolston, Southampton
- Laid down: 29 December 1937
- Launched: 19 January 1939
- Completed: 13 June 1939
- Identification: Pennant number: T85
- Fate: Sunk, 14 February 1942

General characteristics
- Class & type: Dragonfly-class river gunboat
- Displacement: 585 long tons (594 t) (standard); 685 long tons (696 t) (deep load)
- Length: 196 ft 6 in (59.9 m)
- Beam: 33 ft (10.1 m)
- Draught: 6 ft 3 in (1.9 m)
- Installed power: 2 Admiralty 3-drum boilers; 3,800 shp (2,800 kW)
- Propulsion: 2 shafts, 2 geared steam turbines
- Speed: 17 knots (31 km/h; 20 mph)
- Complement: 74
- Armament: 2 × single 4 in (102 mm) guns; 1 × single 3.7 in (94 mm) howitzer; 8 × single .303 in (7.7 mm) anti-aircraft machine guns

HMS Grasshopper was a Dragonfly-class river gunboat built for the Royal Navy in the late 1930s. After completion, she was sent to the China station where she was deployed on the Yangtse River to relieve the Insect-class gunboat HMS Gnat. She remained there until the declaration of war by the Empire of Japan in December 1941. She was subsequently transferred to Singapore Naval Base and participated in the Malayan Campaign in early 1942. Near the end of the Battle of Singapore, she evacuated the base on 11 February together with her sister ship HMS Dragonfly. Three days later she was attacked and sunk by Japanese aircraft off the island of Sebayer. Most of the ship's survivors were later captured on Sumatra by Japanese troops.

== Design and description ==
The design of the Dragonfly-class ships was based on that of the earlier HMS Scorpion with that ship's flagship accommodations replaced by a low-angle director-control tower. Grasshopper displaced 585 long tons (594 t) at standard load and 685 long tons (696 t) at deep load. The ship had an overall length of 196 feet 6 inches (59.9 m), a beam of 33 feet (10.1 m) and a draught of 6 feet 3 inches (1.9 m). She was powered by Parsons geared steam turbines, driving two shafts which developed a total of 3,800 shaft horsepower (2,800 kW) and gave a maximum speed of 17 knots (31 km/h; 20 mph). Steam for the turbines was provided by two Admiralty 3-drum boilers. Grasshopper carried a maximum of 90 long tons (91 t) of fuel oil.

The ship mounted two quick-firing (QF) guns 4-inch Mk V guns in single mounts, one each fore and aft of the superstructure. These guns had a maximum elevation of +30 degrees. She also carried a single QF 3.7-inch howitzer. For anti-aircraft defence, Grasshopper had eight single mounts for .303-inch (7.7 mm) anti-aircraft machine guns. She had a crew of 74 officers and ratings.

== Service ==
The ship was ordered on 9 August 1937 as one of the intended replacements for the existing river gunboats stationed on the Chinese rivers. Grasshopper was laid down on 29 December 1937 by John I. Thornycroft & Company at Woolston, Southampton, and launched on 19 January 1939.

In April 1939 she sailed to the China Station under her own power and was expected to arrive on 24 May. While on her voyage to the China Station she came across the Danish ship Alsia on fire 20 miles south of the Barberyn Lighthouse, Ceylon on 9 May. All passengers and part of the crew had been taken off by the British Liner "Canton" and Grasshopper took off the rest of her crew. They were transferred to a Tug so she could resume her voyage to China. Grasshopper was commissioned on 1 June 1939 in Hong Kong and completed on 13 June. She was deployed to the Yangtse River where she replaced the Insect-class gunboat HMS Gnat later that month. Part of Gnat's crew transferred to Grasshopper, including the ship's mascot, a dog called Judy. Following Japan's entry into the Second World War in December 1941, she was transferred from China to Singapore. During January 1942, Grasshopper supported retreating Allied troops during the Malayan Campaign. Starting on 27 January, Grasshopper and Dragonfly rescued almost 3,000 soldiers from the British 53rd Infantry and 15th Indian Infantry Brigades from the swamps south of Batu Pahat after they had been cut off by the advancing Japanese forces.

After the Japanese captured the Malayan Peninsula, both ships moved to Singapore harbour. On 8 February, the Japanese launched an amphibious assault across the Strait of Johore and following heavy fighting, many ships began evacuating from the harbour. By 11 February Gnat and Grasshopper were the largest vessels left. The two ships left Singapore for Batavia at 21:00 on 13 February, having taken on other personnel to evacuate them. Amongst these was Commander Ian Forbes, formerly of the battleship Prince of Wales, which had been sunk by the Japanese just over two months earlier. By the following morning they could hear the attacks by Japanese aircraft on other vessels in the distance. As they were sailing south, they were attacked by Japanese bombers. During the initial pass, Grasshopper was hit by a single bomb. When the planes returned, Dragonfly was hit three times and sank quickly. Grasshopper was hit twice and was set on fire. The order to abandon ship was given as the fire spread to compartments adjacent to an ammunition store.

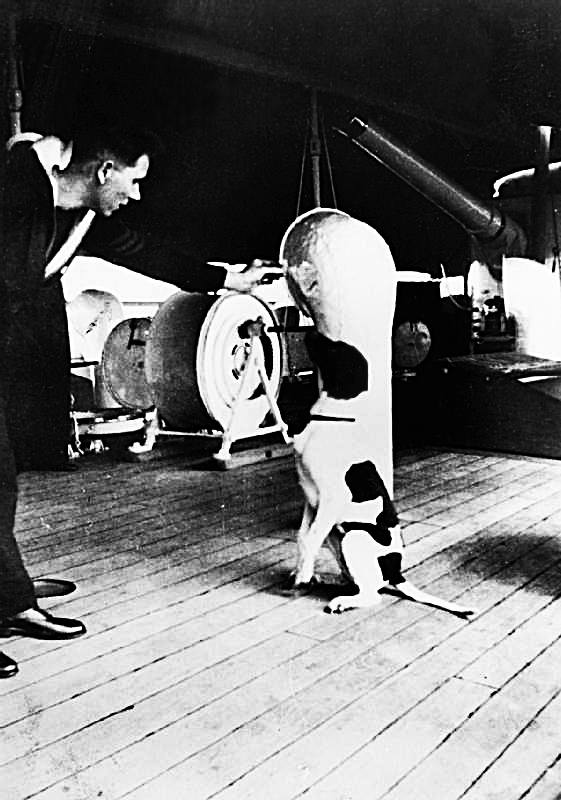
Judy, the ship's dog, later became a Japanese prisoner of war and was awarded the Dicken Medal for bravery.

The crew were ferried across to the nearby island of Sebayer by the ship's boats while the Japanese aircraft strafed them, where they joined some survivors from the Dragonfly. However the ship did not sink initially and after the planes departed, several crewmen were sent back on board to scavenge supplies. Among the survivors were six captured Japanese airmen and two pregnant women who had their babies delivered by the ship's coxswain. Both boys were named after him by their mothers. Whilst on board, Petty Officer George White found Judy, who would later find a source of fresh water for the crew on the island. On 19 February, the remaining crew managed to commandeer a Chinese tongkang and using that and the ship's boat, they reached Singkep in the Dutch East Indies. After two days, the crew departed for Sumatra on a Chinese junk, leaving their injured in the care of the Dutch Empire. They eventually reached Sumatra and sailed through the Strait of Malacca and up the Indragiri River. The river narrowed too much for the junk to go any further, leaving the crew 200 miles (320 km) from Padang. They trekked through the jungle but entered a Japanese-held area and were captured 4 miles (6.4 km) outside their destination.

Two of the crew elected not to travel with the others to Sumatra. They were Petty Officer George White and Able Seaman "Tancy" Lee, who were joined by one of the evacuees from the Royal Naval Reserve and two British Army soldiers who were already on Singkep. To prevent trouble with the incoming Japanese forces, they were transferred to the smaller Selajar Island. They were subsequently offered a boat by the island's administrator, and a map of the Indian Ocean torn from a child's atlas. They decided that they would aim to sail to Madras, India, as there were concerns that the Japanese were working their way through the islands. Their departure timetable was brought forward after the island was visited by a boat containing a Japanese officer and five soldiers. They were told by the Japanese to remain on the island and await collection. That evening they prepared the boat and put supplies on board. They departed on 11 April, only travelling by night until they were clear of the islands. During the day, they landed on nearby islands and hid. After four days, the engine broke and could not be turned off. As they travelled through the islands, they passed two Japanese transport ships and were buzzed by a Japanese bomber. Once out of sight of the islands, they navigated using the position of the stars during the night and the sun during the day. After seventeen days of travelling, they landed in India, a distance of 2,680 miles (4,310 km), only 23 miles (37 km) away from their intended destination.
