= Judy (dog) =

Dog held with British POWs in WWII

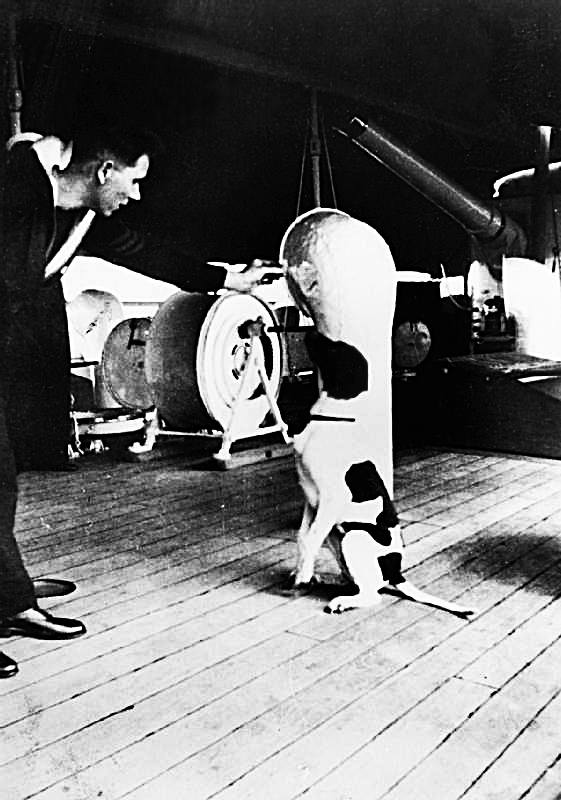
- Judy on the deck of HMS Grasshopper
- Other name: 81A Gloegoer Medan
- Species: Canis familiaris
- Breed: Pointer
- Born: February 1936; Shanghai, China
- Died: 17 February 1950 (aged 13–14); Tanzania
- Resting place: Nachingwea, Tanzania
- Occupation: Ship's mascot
- Employer: Royal Navy
- Years active: 1936–1946
- Known for: Japanese Prisoner of war
- Appearance: Liver and white markings
- Awards: Dickin Medal

Judy (1936 – 17 February 1950) was a ship's dog aboard HMS Gnat and Grasshopper stationed on the Yangtze before and during World War II. She proved able to hear incoming aircraft, providing the crew with an early warning. After part of the crew transferred from Gnat to Grasshopper in June 1939 the ship was sent to Singapore after the British declaration of war on Germany. There she was aboard the ship during the Battle of Singapore, in which Grasshopper evacuated for the Dutch East Indies. It was sunk en route and Judy was nearly killed, having been trapped by a falling row of lockers. She was rescued when a crewman returned to the stricken vessel looking for supplies.

On the deserted island with the surviving crew, Judy managed to find a fresh water source. They made their way to Singkep in the Dutch East Indies and afterwards to Sumatra aiming to link up with the evacuating British forces. After trekking across 200 miles of jungle for five weeks, during which Judy survived an attack from a crocodile, the crew arrived a day after the final vessel had left and subsequently became prisoners of war of the Japanese. She was eventually smuggled into the Gloegoer prisoner of war camp in Medan, where she first met Leading Aircraftsman Frank Williams, with whom she would go on to spend the rest of her life. Williams convinced the camp Commandant to register her as an official prisoner of war, with the number '81A Gloegoer Medan'. She was the only dog to be registered as a prisoner of war during the Second World War.

She moved around several more camps, and survived the sinking of the transport ship Harugiku Maru where in the aftermath she saved several passengers from drowning. Les Searle from Grasshopper smuggled her once again into the next camp, where she was reunited with Frank Williams. After the end of the war, Judy's life was put in danger once again. She was about to be put to death by the Japanese guards following a lice outbreak amongst the prisoners. However, Williams hid the dog until the Allied forces arrived. Searle, Williams, and others smuggled Judy back to the UK aboard a troopship and she spent the next six months in quarantine after arriving. She was awarded the Dickin Medal by the PDSA, considered to be the animals' Victoria Cross. Judy died in 1950 in Tanzania from a tumour, after travelling with Williams there to work on a groundnut food scheme. Her Dickin Medal and collar were subsequently put on display at the Imperial War Museum as part of 'The Animal's War' exhibition.

== Early life ==
Judy was a pure-bred liver and white Pointer. She was born in February 1936 in the Shanghai Dog Kennels, a boarding kennel used by English expatriates in Shanghai, China. Judy was one of seven puppies to a dog named Kelly owned by a couple from Sussex. At the age of three months, she escaped and had been kept in a back alley by a shopkeeper until she was six months old. Following an altercation with some sailors from a Japanese Navy gunboat, she was found by a worker from the kennel and returned there. She was originally called Shudi, which was anglicised to become Judy. By the time she returned to the kennel, her mother and siblings were no longer there.

In the autumn of 1936, the crew of the Insect-class gunboat HMS Gnat voted to get a ship's mascot. This was due in part to the competitive nature of the gunboats, with HMS Bee, Cicada, and Cricket already having mascots of their own. The Captain and the Chief Bosun's mate, Lt. Cmdr. J. Waldergrave and Chief Petty Officer Charles Jefferey, purchased Judy from the kennel and presented her to the crew. As her mother was known as Kelly of Sussex, Judy was listed as Judy of Sussex in her Royal Navy paperwork. It was hoped to train her as a gundog, but the men began to treat her like a pet instead, and several days after her arrival, Jefferey's log stated that "our chances of making her a trained gundog are very small." Her time spent on the streets of Shanghai was blamed for her lack of hunting instinct; the only time that she would point in the traditional manner was when she could smell food.

== Military career ==
=== HMS Gnat ===
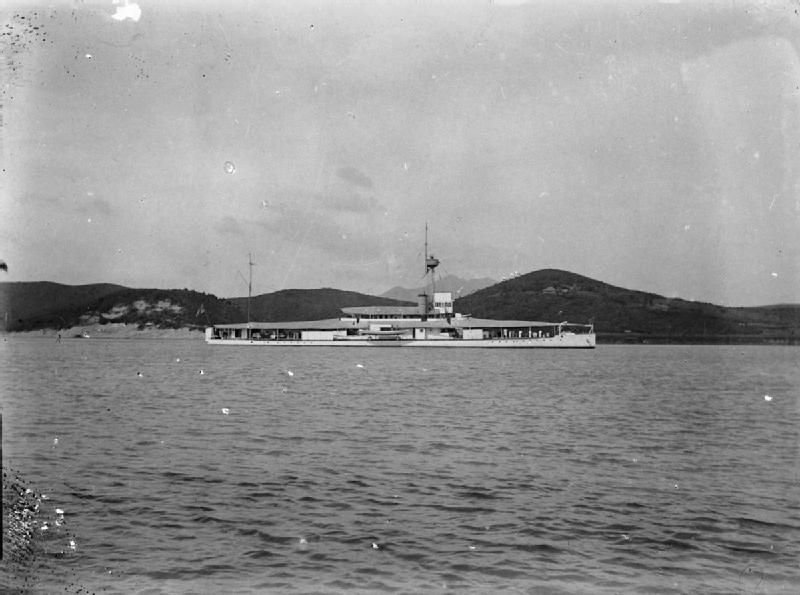
HMS Gnat, photographed in 1922

Able seaman Jan "Tankey" Cooper was given the job of being the "Keeper of the Ship's Dog", who was also the ship's butcher. She was given an open box and a blanket to sleep on. She was trained to stop her from going into certain areas of the ship, such as those inhabited by the Chinese cooks as they disliked her. In November 1936, she fell overboard from the forecastle into the Yangtze River and was spotted by Jefferey. The ship was called to a full stop and a power boat deployed to retrieve her. The incident was recorded in the ship's log as a man overboard exercise. As the boat returned to Gnat, the crew sent the semaphore message "Judy's christening completed". The crew began to find the dog useful in navigating the river, as she was able to alert them to cess boats in sufficient time to close all hatches and minimise the smell.

After undergoing trials following a refit, Gnat met up with HMS Ladybird, who also had a ship's dog. However Judy had to be kept away as while he took a fancy to her, she did not care for him. In the early morning after Ladybird departed, Judy alerted the ship to the presence of river pirates who were about to board Gnat in the darkness. The attack was easily repelled as the pirates lost the surprise element. Several days later, Judy was taken ashore with a shooting party for the first time but she was unsuccessful as a gundog. Throughout her stay on Gnat, the crew repeatedly tried to use her as a gundog, each time resulting in a failure.

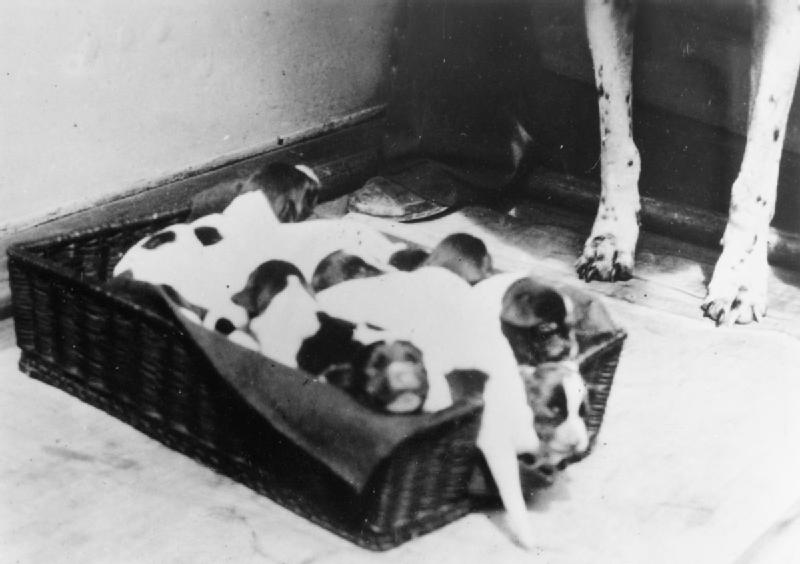
One of Judy's litters of puppies.

Judy also pointed out the approach of hostile Japanese aircraft long before any of the human crew could hear them. This first occurred prior to the outbreak of war, when the aircraft would fly low over Gnat with Judy barking at them until they had passed. On an outing to Jiujiang, Jefferey took Judy for a walk outside of the city but she ran ahead, pulling him with her. He realised as he looked back that she had been pulling him away from a leopard. In November 1937, Gnat met with the American river gunboat USS Panay. After Panay held a party for the two ship's companies, Gnat crew departed and only realised afterwards that Judy was not with them. They contacted Panay via signal lamp, but they insisted that they had not seen her. The following morning, the crew heard from a Chinese trader that Judy was aboard Panay after all. In retaliation, a party boarded the American vessel and stole the ship's bell. Afterwards they contacted Panay and offered them the bell back in return for Judy. She was returned within the hour.

In early 1938, both Jefferey and Cooper were sent back to Britain as part of the crew rotation. While docked in Hankou, Judy took a liking to another Pointer aboard a French gunboat Francis Garnier. The two ship's companies held an impromptu wedding ceremony for the two dogs. The French Pointer, Paul, remained on Gnat for three days before returning to his ship. Judy became pregnant, and gave birth to thirteen puppies. Ten of them survived and were eventually given away to a variety of sources including Francis Garnier and the American gunboat USS Guam. Judy was involved in an incident in October that year that resulted in the ending of her trips ashore in Hankou. Whilst being walked by two sailors from Gnat, they were confronted by Japanese soldiers who pointed a loaded rifle at Judy. One of the soldiers was thrown into the Yangtze River by Leading Seaman Jack Law in response. During the following days, several Japanese officers came aboard Gnat and it was decided that it would be better for Judy to stay on the ship.

=== HMS Grasshopper ===
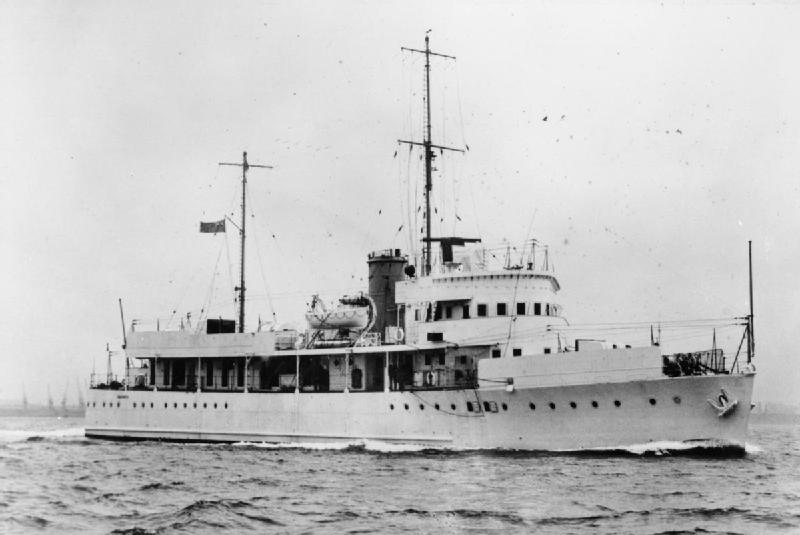
HMS Grasshopper, photographed in 1940.

In June 1939, several Locust class gunboats arrived on the Yangtze to take over operations from the existing Insect class vessels. Part of the crew of Gnat transferred to HMS Grasshopper, including Judy. Following the British declaration of war on Germany in September that year, several of the river gunboats, Grasshopper included, were redeployed to the British base at Singapore. Judy was initially sea sick, but the crew ensured that she was properly exercised and by the time the ship arrived on station, she had recovered.

Initially the stay at Singapore was peaceful, and Judy stayed with a customs official and his family for a week ashore. The ship was rarely deployed until January 1942 when it was deployed with other gunboats to provide covering bombardments along the coast of Malaya for retreating troops, and occasionally to carry out evacuations. By this time, Judy was primarily being looked after by Petty Officer George White. The Battle of Singapore took place between 8–15 February. On the first day, along with the other military vessels, Grasshopper was sailed out to sea to provide anti-aircraft fire. By 11 February, Grasshopper and its sister ship Dragonfly were the largest vessels left at Singapore. On 13 February, the vessels were ordered to evacuate personnel and leave Singapore. The ships left at 9pm that evening, and travelled together. White later reported that Judy had "personally greeted virtually everyone on board".

The ships headed for Batavia in the Dutch East Indies. Fearing the Japanese Navy, they sought to travel via the Lingga Islands hoping that the island group it sat in could be used as a hiding place. As they approached on 14 February, Judy indicated the approach of Japanese aircraft and the anti-aircraft gunners took up their positions in readiness. Grasshopper was hit with a single bomb before the planes departed. Judy was below decks when the planes returned. Dragonfly was hit by three bombs and sank quickly. Grasshopper was hit by a further two bombs, and the order was given to abandon ship as a fire spread close to an ammunition compartment. Boats were lowered and the crew and evacuees were ferried just over a hundred yards to shore whilst the Japanese planes strafed the vessels. It was only when they were ashore that they realised Judy was not with them.

The island they arrived on turned out to be uninhabited with little food and no apparent water. After a camp had been set up ashore, White was sent back to the still floating Grasshopper to scavenge supplies. He boarded the vessel and descended below decks to search for any items that might be of use. Whilst there, he felt Judy in the darkness, pinned in her bed under a row of lockers. He constructed a raft out of materials on Grasshopper and rowed the items, along with Judy, back to the island. The lack of water was becoming an issue, until Judy began to dig at a point on the waterline. It took a couple of minutes, but Judy managed to unearth a fresh-water spring and was credited with saving everyone's lives. During the first night, the magazine on Grasshopper finally caught light and exploded, sinking the vessel. The survivors continued to camp on the beach for the following few days, with Judy protecting them from snakes.

Five days after Grasshopper was bombed, a tongkang arrived which took the survivors to Singkep Island, the largest of the Lingga Islands. There they left their wounded, and Judy along with the other survivors travelled two days later on a Chinese junk to Sumatra where it was hoped that a British force remained which could take them to Sri Lanka. Upon arrival, they took the vessel up a series of rivers until they narrowed so much that the junk could not pass. They then embarked on a 200 miles (320 km) cross-country trek across the island in an attempt to reach Padang. During the journey through the jungle, Judy was attacked by a crocodile and suffered a cut to her shoulder. The survivors patched up the 6 inches (15 cm) cut with their limited first aid supplies. She continued to warn them of approaching predators, and one crewman claimed she saved him from a Sumatran tiger. They emerged from the jungle at Sawahlunto, where they caught the train towards Padang. The group missed the last evacuation ship by nine days, with the Japanese due to arrive to take over the city at any moment. After the arrival of the Japanese, the survivors from Grasshopper along with Judy, were taken into custody as prisoners of war on 18 March.

=== Prisoner of war ===
==== Medan ====
The crew became prisoners of war, initially held in Padang, but were soon moved onto Belawan. They smuggled Judy on board the transport trucks, hidden under empty rice sacks. After five days they arrived at the Gloegoer prisoner of war camp in Medan. Chief Petty Officer Leonard Williams recorded, "thus began 3–4 years of the most horrific labour, torture, starvation, and every degradation the Japanese could inflict on us". She was looked after by Les Searle from Grasshopper, and a Private named Cousens who had a job making leather goods for the guards. Cousens would feed scraps of leather to Judy, but died of malaria a short time after the two servicemen had stolen a large quantity of rice from the Japanese.

In August, Judy met Leading Aircraftman Frank Williams, who adopted her and shared his daily handful of rice. In the camp Judy would intervene by distracting the guards when they were administering punishment. She was the only animal to have been officially registered as a prisoner of war during the Second World War, after Frank William's intervention to protect the dog from the guards, who would often threaten to shoot Judy as the dog growled and barked at them. Williams managed to convince the camp Commandant, who was drunk on sake, to sign the registration papers with the promise of one of Judy's future puppies. Judy's official prisoner-of-war name was '81A Gloegoer Medan'.

During her stay at the camp, she would alert the prisoners to the approach of the Japanese guards and also if other animals such as snakes or scorpions were around. She also made excursions from the camp, looking for food, and would bring back rats and snakes to Williams. Judy had another group of puppies, of which five survived. One of them was given to the camp Commandant as promised and another puppy was smuggled into the women's camp along with any food that the men could spare. A further puppy was given to the Red Cross in Medan, one more was beaten to death by a drunken guard, and the final one remained in the camp after Judy and Williams left.

In June 1944, the men were to be transferred to Singapore aboard the hell ship Harugiku Maru. Dogs were not allowed aboard, but Frank Williams taught Judy to lie still and silent inside a rice sack. When he boarded the ship, Judy climbed into a sack and Williams slung it over his shoulder to take aboard. For three hours the men were forced to stand on deck in the searing heat, and for the whole time Judy remained still and silent in the bag on Williams' back. The conditions aboard ship were cramped, with more than 700 prisoners. On 26 June 1944 HMS Truculent torpedoed the ship. Williams pushed Judy out of a porthole in an attempt to save her life, even though there was a 15 feet (4.6 m) drop to the sea. Over 500 of the passengers did not survive.

==== Return to Sumatra ====
Frank Williams was recaptured and was sent to a new camp without news of Judy's survival. However, stories began being told of a dog helping drowning men reach pieces of debris on which to hold, and others recalled how the dog would bring them flotsam to keep them afloat. She had been found in the water by other survivors of the sinking, and once again hidden from the Japanese. Upon arrival at a dock, she was found by Les Searle who tried to smuggle her onto a truck with him. However, she was discovered by a Japanese Captain who threatened to kill her – whose order was countermanded by the newly arrived former Commander of the Medan camp and she was allowed to travel with Searle onto the new camp.

Williams was giving up hope of finding Judy when she arrived in his new camp. After four weeks at the new camp, they were moved back to Sumatra by paddle steamer. They had been told that it was a "special mission" to pick fruit. Instead they spent a year in Sumatra, with the Japanese using the men to cut through the jungle to lay railway track. She also proved useful in conducting trades with the locals, as she would indicate when someone was hiding near to the track. Her barking deliberately alerted the guards to when there was something too large for her to handle in the jungle, such as tigers or elephants.

The experience saw a change in the dog, with Frank later writing, "She wasn't that tame, obedient dog anymore, she was a skinny animal that kept herself alive through cunning and instinct." Because of the remoteness of the work camp, she was at a reduced risk from the local population who Frank feared would eat her. A radarman named Tom Scott later wrote that Frank and Judy shared an unusual bond, with Frank able to send the dog into the jungle with a click and recall her with a whistle. On one occasion, Frank found Judy attempting to bury an elephant's leg bone.

In early 1945, Frank began to find that Judy was more aggressive towards the Japanese and Korean guards. Although he'd normally send her into the jungle to avoid them, on one occasion, the guards gave chase and shot at the dog. He later found Judy bleeding from the shoulder where she had been grazed by the bullet. He covered the wound with some palm fronds, but could do nothing else to treat or reward her. After moving camps once more, Judy was sentenced to death by the Japanese as part of a plan to control a lice breakout. She disappeared for three days, with guards conducting sweeps in an attempt to find her. She only reappeared when the Japanese forces abandoned the camp.

== Post war and awards ==
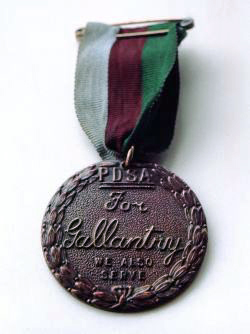
An example of a Dickin Medal.

Two members of the Royal Air Force (RAF) parachuted in, and informed the residents to remain until allied troops arrived. Judy was smuggled aboard the troopship Antenor heading to Liverpool. Together with Williams, Searle, and two others, Judy managed to avoid the dock police and was delivered into the care of the ship's cook, who ensured that she was fed on the voyage home. Frank revealed Judy to the crew after six weeks, as the ship was three days from arriving in Liverpool. Although some low-ranking crew members had become aware of the dog before this, the Captain had not. Initially angry, he was talked around by Frank. Between the Captain and RAF serviceman Brian Comford, whose father was a barrister, the authorities were convinced to allow the dog to land. Upon her return to the UK, Judy stayed for six months in quarantine in Hackbridge, Surrey. Frank visited regularly, as did a number of servicemen who had known the dog during their internment in Asia. The quarantine was not free, and Frank was required to pay £12 to cover the costs. He could not afford this, so an advert was placed in the December 1945 edition of the Tail-Waggers Club magazine. A total of £18, 18 shillings and eight pence was raised from 61 donations. Judy was released from quarantine on 29 April 1946 to Frank, and the pair headed immediately to London. A ceremony was organised by the Kennel Club, with chairman Arthur Croxton Smith awarding her a "For Valor" medal.

During his posting to Sunninghill Park with Judy, where he underwent refresher training from the RAF, Frank would sell photographs of the dog to raise money for the People's Dispensary for Sick Animals. They were then posted to a base in West Kirby, Merseyside. The story of Judy grew over time, with features in national newspapers calling her "Gunboat Judy". At an event held in Cadogan Square by the PDSA in May 1946 and attended by Maria Dickin, Judy was awarded the Dickin Medal, which is often referred to as the animal metaphorical equivalent of the Victoria Cross. Williams was given the White Cross of St Giles, with each awarded by Major Viscount Tarbat MC, chairman of the Returned British POW Association. Judy was enrolled as the association's only canine member.

For magnificent courage and endurance in Japanese prison camps, which helped to maintain morale among her fellow prisoners and also for saving many lives through her intelligence and watchfulness

— Judy's Dickin Medal citation

She was interviewed by the BBC for their radio coverage of the London Victory Celebrations of 1946 on 8 June and her barks were broadcast around the world as part of the programme In Town Tonight. The pair appeared at the "Stars of Blitz and Battlefront" event held at Wembley Stadium, in front of over 82,000 spectators along with fellow Dickin Medal winner Rob. The two dogs had become friendly at various events where they appeared together, and at Wembley when a Borzoi bit Judy backstage, Rob came to her defence. In response, the Borzoi's appearance was cancelled.

Frank and Judy spent the year after the war visiting the relatives of PoWs who had not survived; Frank remarked that Judy always seemed to give a comforting presence. They raised money for charities and appeared at dog shows throughout the country. Upon meeting David Niven, he remarked that she was the "loveliest bitch he had ever clapped eyes on". On 22 July 1946, the pair were demobilised. Frank took Judy home to Portsmouth.

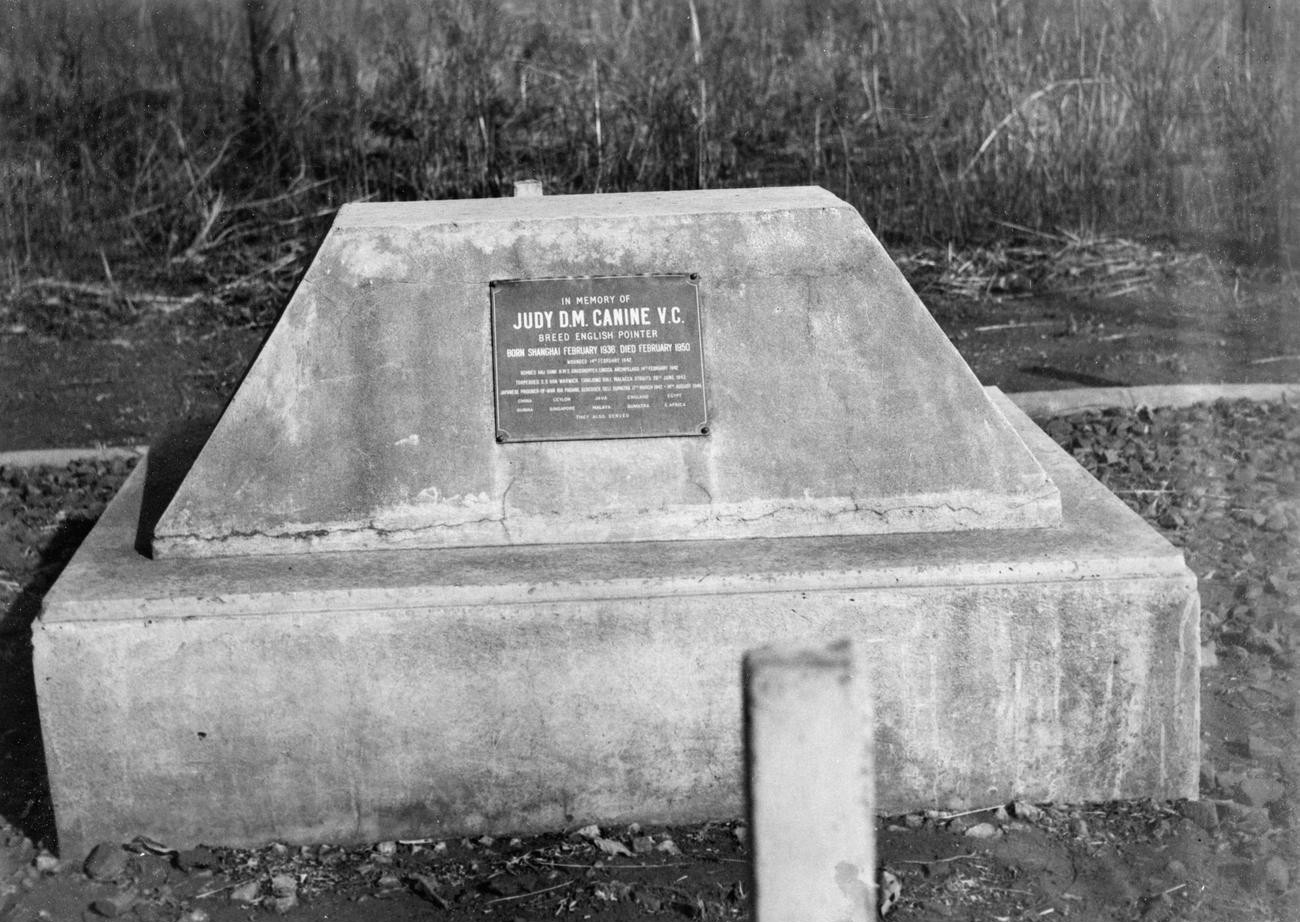
Judy's grave in Tanzania, Africa.

On 10 May 1948, the pair left to work on a government-funded groundnut food scheme in East Africa. There was some difficulty in getting permission for Judy to travel, and it was feared that she and Williams would be split up. This issue was promoted in the Evening Standard, and after the involvement of William Lever, 2nd Viscount Leverhulme, permission was given for Judy to travel with Williams. She had a third and final litter of puppies during her time in Africa. After two years there, Judy was discovered to have a mammary tumour; an operation removed the growth, but a tetanus infection soon set in, and she was euthanized on 17 February 1950 at the age of nearly 14. She was buried in her RAF jacket, with her campaign medals, the Pacific Star, the 1939–1945 Star, and the Defence Medal. Frank built a monument with a metal plaque that described Judy’s life. The memorial, in Nachingwea, had lost its plaque and was in disrepair by 2016. The church of St. Andrew’s in Stapleford, Cambridgeshire, which has a 40 year link with a sister church in Nachingwea, Tanzania and is involved with many projects in the area, held a public appeal for the funding of a new plaque. In 2018, the new plaque was installed and the memorial to Judy fully restored.

On 27 February 1972, Judy was remembered in church services across Gosport and Portsmouth. Her story was told in a book entitled The Judy Story in 1973, and in 1992 it was featured in the British children's TV show Blue Peter. In 2006 her collar and Dickin Medal went on public display for the first time in the Imperial War Museum, London, as part of "The Animals' War" exhibition. It was presented to the IWM by Alan Williams, Frank's son.

== See also ==
- List of individual dogs
- Sergeant Reckless
