= HMS Truculent (P315) =

T-class submarine of the Royal Navy, in service from 1942 to 1950

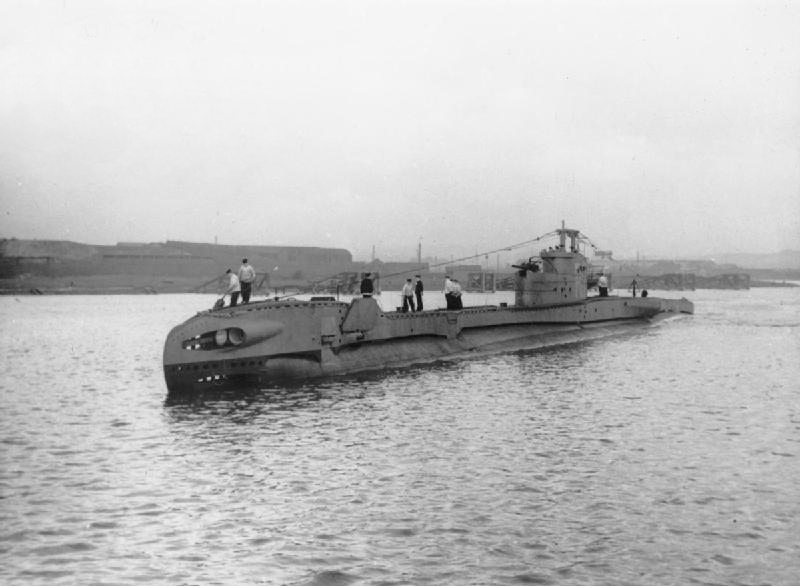
- HMS Truculent at Barrow in December 1942

History

United Kingdom
- Name: HMS Truculent
- Builder: Vickers-Armstrongs, Barrow
- Laid down: 4 December 1941
- Launched: 12 September 1942
- Commissioned: 31 December 1942
- Identification: Pennant number P315
- Fate: Accidentally sunk 12 January 1950
- Badge

General characteristics
- Class & type: T-class submarine
- Displacement: 1,290 long tons (1,311 t) (surfaced); 1,560 long tons (1,585 t) (submerged)
- Length: 276 ft 6 in (84.28 m)
- Beam: 25 ft 6 in (7.77 m)
- Draught: 12 ft 9 in (3.89 m) forward; 14 ft 7 in (4.45 m) aft
- Installed power: 5,000 hp (3,700 kW) (diesel engines); 2,900 hp (2,200 kW) (electric motors)
- Propulsion: 2 × diesel engines; 2 × electric motors; 2 × shafts
- Speed: 15.5 kn (17.8 mph; 28.7 km/h) (surfaced); 9 kn (10 mph; 17 km/h) (submerged)
- Range: 4,500 nmi (5,200 mi; 8,300 km) at 11 kn (13 mph; 20 km/h) (surfaced)
- Test depth: 300 ft (91 m) max
- Complement: 61
- Armament: Six internal, forward-facing 21-inch (533 mm) torpedo tubes; Two external, forward-facing torpedo tubes; Two external, amidships, rear-facing torpedo tubes; One external, rear-facing torpedo tube (six reload torpedoes); One 4-inch (102 mm) deck gun; Three anti-aircraft machine guns

HMS Truculent was a British submarine of the third group of the T-class. She was built as P315 by Vickers-Armstrongs, Barrow, and launched on 12 September 1942. She sank nine enemy vessels.

The submarine was funded by donations from the town of Glossop in Derbyshire, whose population raised £175,000 in 1942-3 to fund warships.

Truculent struck a Swedish oil tanker outside the mouth of the Medway in January 1950, and sank, with the loss of 64 men. The number was unusually high, as the submarine was ferrying workers in addition to the crew. In March 1950, the wreck was towed to the destined nearby dockyard then sold for scrap.

Regional navigation rules thereafter mandated a Truculent Light – a panoramic white light on the bow of submarines moving under their own power.

== Wartime service ==
Truculent spent much of her World War II wartime service in the Pacific Far East, save for early 1943, operating on the European shelf. Here, in the Norwegian Sea she sank the German submarine U-308, with all hands on its first patrol.

She took part in Operation Source, towing the X-class midget submarine X-6 to Norway to attack the heavy Kriegsmarine warships Tirpitz, Scharnhorst and Lützow.

On her transfer to the Pacific, she sank the Japanese army cargo ship Yasushima Maru; the small vessel Mantai; the Hell ship Harugiku Maru with 180 of 720 POWs killed; and five Japanese sailing vessels. She also laid mines, one of which damaged the Japanese minelayer Hatsutaka.

She survived the war and returned to the United Kingdom to continue in service with the Royal Navy.

== Sinking ==
On 12 January 1950, Truculent was returning to Sheerness, having completed trials after a refit at Chatham. In addition to her peacetime complement, she was carrying 18 dockyard workers. She was delving into the Thames Estuary at night. At 19:00, a ship showing three lights appeared ahead. It was decided it must be stationary, and because Truculent could not pass to the starboard side without running aground, the order was given to turn to port. At once, the situation became clear; the Swedish oil tanker Divina – on passage from Purfleet and bound for Ipswich – came out of the darkness. The extra light indicated that she was carrying a very combustible cargo. The two collided, the Divina's bow striking Truculent by the starboard bow hydroplane, and remained locked together for a few seconds before the submarine sank.

Fifty-seven of her crew were swept away in the current from a later-deemed premature escape – 15 survivors were picked up by a boat from the Divina and five by the Dutch ship Almdijk. Most of the crew survived the collision and escaped, but died in the freezing cold mid-winter conditions on the mud islands that litter the estuary.

Sixty-four men died. Truculent was salvaged on 14 March and beached at Cheney Spit. The wreck was moved inshore the next day, where 10 bodies were recovered. She was refloated on 23 March and towed into Sheerness Dockyard. An inquiry attributed 75% of the blame to Truculent and 25% to Divina.

Truculent was then sold to be broken up for scrap on 8 May 1950.

Her loss led Peter de Neumann of the Port of London Authority to develop plans for a port control system, and the later introduction of the 'Truculent light', an extra steaming all-round white light on the bow, on British submarines, to ensure they remained highly visible to other ships.

== Commemoration in coinciding film ==
On 21 February 1950, the film Morning Departure was released. The story, of a British submarine on a training cruise that sinks after encountering a loose mine, is told from the perspective of the small group of survivors trapped under the sea. Filming finished shortly before HMS Truculent sank, and the film was almost withdrawn. The decision was made to release the film as planned, and to add the following message that appears in the opening credits:

This film was completed before the tragic loss of HMS Truculent, and earnest consideration has been given as to the desirability of presenting it so soon after this grievous disaster. The Producers have decided to offer the film in the spirit in which it was made, as a tribute to the officers and men of H.M. Submarines, and to the Royal Navy of which they form a part.

== See also ==
- HMS Affray (P421)
- HMS Thetis (N25)
- List of United Kingdom disasters by death toll

== Publications ==
- Colledge, J. J.; Warlow, Ben (2006) [1969]. Ships of the Royal Navy: The Complete Record of All Fighting Ships of the Royal Navy from the 15th Century to the Present (3rd Rev ed.). London: Chatham Publishing. ISBN 978-1-86176-281-8. OCLC 67375475.
- Hutchinson, Robert (2001). Jane's Submarines: War Beneath the Waves from 1776 to the Present Day. London: HarperCollins. ISBN 978-0-00-710558-8. OCLC 53783010.
- Johnson-Allen, John. They Were Just Skulls, The Naval Career of Fred Henley, Last Survivor of HM Submarine Truculent. Whittles Publishing. ISBN 978-184995-404-4.
