= HMS Scorpion (T67) =

British River gunboat of WWII

HMS Scorpion was a river gunboat of the Royal Navy constructed in 1938. Built at Whites in Cowes, launched on 20 December 1937 and completed in November 1938, she served on the China Station at Shanghai from 1938 until December 1940, when she sailed to Singapore. She was sunk on 13 February north of the Banka Straits by the Japanese cruiser Yura and the destroyers Fubuki and Asagiri while attempting to flee Singapore.
