= Bob the Railway Dog =

Part of South Australian folklore

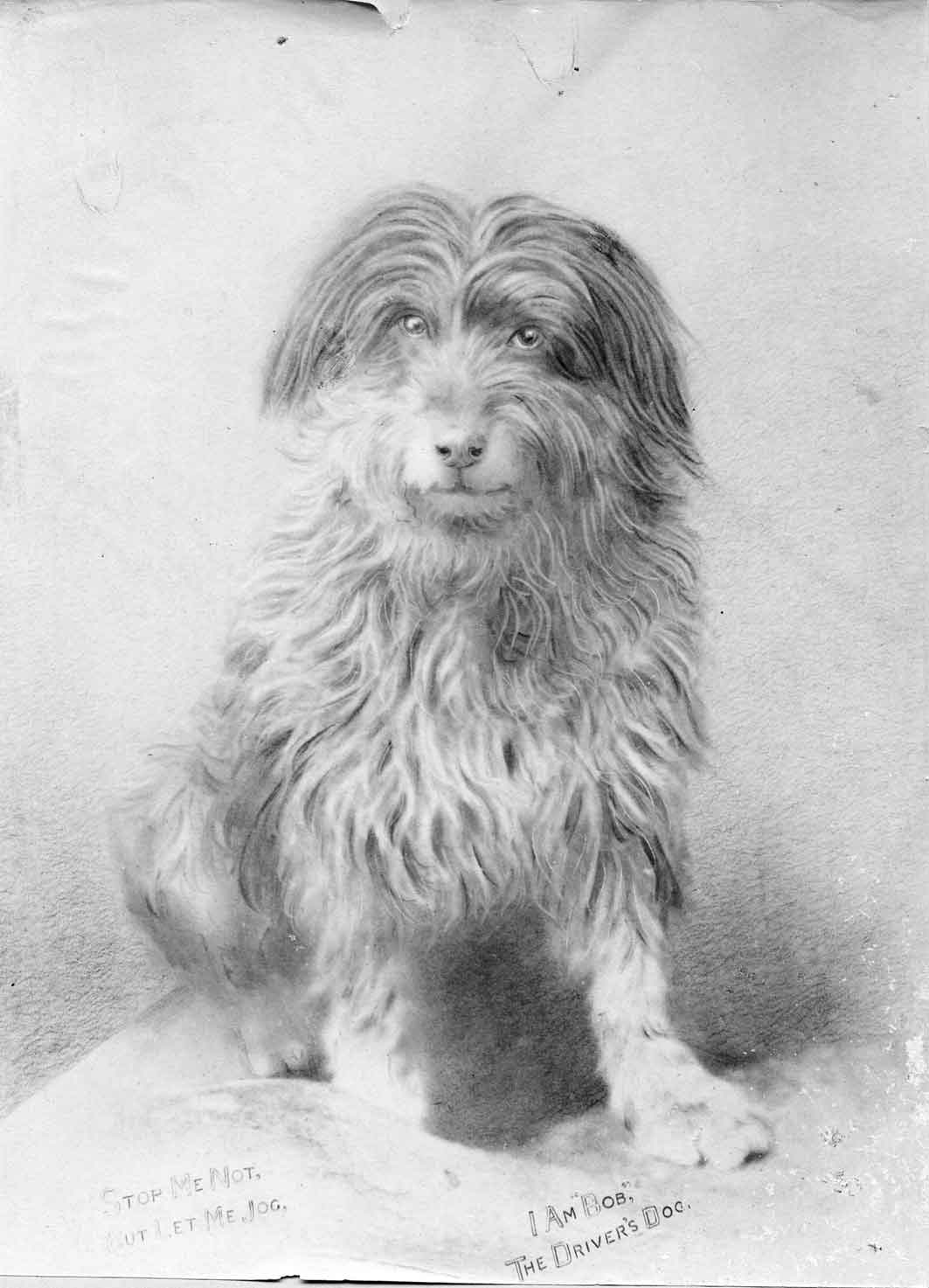
- Other names: Bob, Terowie Bob
- Species: Canis familiaris
- Breed: Koolie/ Smithfield cross
- Sex: Male
- Born: c. 1878; Adelaide Hills, near Macclesfield
- Died: 29 July 1895 (aged 16–17); Hindley Street, Adelaide
- Occupation: Railway traveller
- Employer: South Australian Railways
- Notable role: Driver's companion
- Years active: 1881–1894
- Owners: Railwaymen, Terowie

Bob the Railway Dog (also known as "Terowie Bob") is part of South Australian Railways folklore. He travelled the South Australian Railways system in the latter part of the 19th century, and was widely known to railwaymen of the day; he is part of the folklore in the area, and has been commemorated over the years.

== Life ==
Bob first experienced the railway life when, as a young dog, he took a fancy to the workers building the railway near Strathalbyn and followed some of the navvies to the line. He was brought back to his owner, the publican of the Macclesfield Hotel, two or three times before finally disappearing. He was about nine months old at the time.

His true railway career appears to have commenced not long after being consigned from Adelaide, along with fifty other dogs, to Quorn, to be used to exterminate rabbits near Carrieton. Bob was, it was believed, picked up as a stray in Adelaide. He was swapped (though it has been suggested he "broke pack") for another dog, obtained as a stray from the police in Port Augusta by William Seth Ferry, then working as a special guard at Petersburg as Peterborough was then known. Ferry "registered him right away" and is recorded as noting he acquired Bob on 24 September 1884.

Eventually William Ferry, a nephew of Seth Ferry, the noted horse trainer, was promoted to Petersburg Assistant Station Master in February 1885, by which time Bob had become accustomed to train travel.

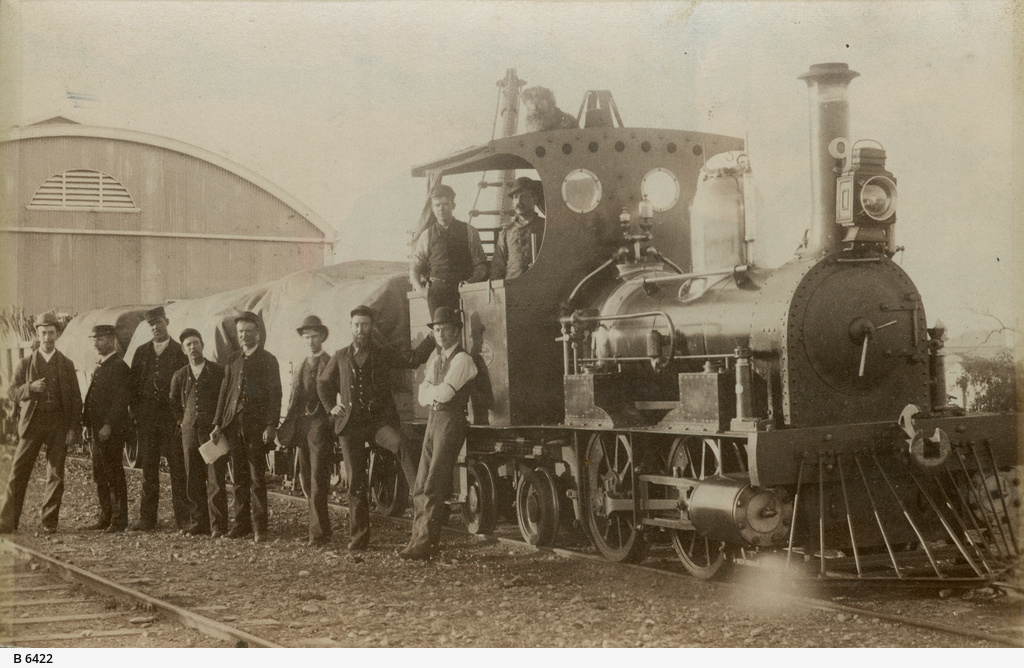
Bob, the railway dog, atop a train at Port Augusta

Bob was known to venture to and from Petersburg, often sitting in the front of the coal space in the locomotive tender, travelling many thousands of miles. According to the Petersburg Times, "His favourite place on a Yankee engine; the big whistle and belching smokestack seem(ed) to have an irresistible attraction for him... he lived on the fat of the land, and was not particular from whom he accepted his dinner."

Bob did not like suburban engines because of their cramped cabs, but was known to clear out third class compartments for his sole use by "vigorously barking at all stations, usually succeeding in convincing intending passengers that the coach had been reserved of his special benefit". "His bark was robust and often caused strangers to believe that he was being aggressive when he really intended to be friendly." He had no master, but was befriended and enabled by the engineers (for whom he seemed to have a special affinity) and trainmen, and permitted to "ride for free, like a politician."

Some sources suggest that Bob's travels took him to all mainland states of Australia, being seen as far afield as Oodnadatta, Queensland, and even Western Australia (given there was no railway connection at the time, this is unlikely). However, he was noted as having "several river trips up the Murray and around the coast". He was present at the opening of the railway between Petersburg and Broken Hill, as a "distinguished guest at the Melbourne Exhibition in 1881". (Note: See Melbourne International Exhibition (1880)) Given that he was not acquired by Ferry until 1884, it is not clear if this was indeed "Bob" (although the source may have confused the 1880 event with the 1888 Melbourne Centennial Exhibition which was held in the building constructed for the 1880 event).

== Accidents ==
Bob is noted as having several accidents in his career. In his early career, Bob had a number of falls, after which he refined his skills jumping up onto, or from one locomotive to another, even as they moved. On one occasion he is reported to have fallen from an engine travelling between Manoora and Saddleworth, and managed to walk two miles to Saddleworth with an injured leg.

In Port Pirie, his tail became jammed – just where is not known. In another incident, Bob is reported as losing an inch off his tail after slipping off, and on another journey, his coat caught fire.

During a stay in Adelaide, Bob is reported to have spent time at Goodwood Cabin, and, after tripping down the cabin's stairs, started rolling under and out the other side of a passing train.

During one of his visits to Port Augusta, Bob is said to have caught a steamship to Port Pirie after apparently confusing the ship's whistle with that of a locomotive.

The Petersburg Times records that "only during one winter did he look miserable, when some employé (on probation) cut off all his hair except that of his neck and tip of his tail. He was supposed to look like a diminutive lion, but his voice betrayed him".

== Bloodline ==
Various reports over the years suggest that while Bob was "well bred", he was most likely a Koolie crossed with a Smithfield. Others claim he was a Bearded Collie.

One correspondent, Henry Hollamby of Macclesfield, claimed in the Southern Argus that he was the breeder, and that "Bob's father was a German collie dog". He writes that he passed the dog to the owner of the Macclesfield Hotel, James Mott. Later research by Parker appears to support this.

== Poem ==
The following poem was published in The Advertiser on 17 August 1895: (Note: Authorship of the poem has been claimed by T. B. Oliver (Thomas Benjamin Oliver, died 1934) of Queenstown, who attributes the photograph on the card mentioned in the reference above, to one Robert Maelor, presumably Robert James Marlor (died 1919). The Children's Hour referred to was an Education Department publication.)

Home-keeping dogs have homely wits,
Their notions tame and poor;
I scorn the dog who humbly sits
Before the cottage door,
Or those who weary vigils keep,
Or follow lowly kine;
A dreary life midst stupid sheep
Shall ne'er be lot of mine.

For free from thrall I travel far,
No fixed abode I own;
I leap aboard a railway car;
By every one I'm known;
Today I'm here, tomorrow brings
Me miles and miles away;
Borne swiftly on steam's rushing wings,
I see fresh friends each day.

Each driver from the footplate hails
My coming with delight;
I gain from all upon the rails;
A welcome ever bright;
I share the perils of the line
With mates from end to end,
Who would not for a silver mine
Have harm befall their friend

Let other dogs snarl and fight,
And round the city prowl,
Or render hideous the night
With unmelodious howl.
I have a cheery bark for all,
No ties my travels clog;
I hear the whistle, that's the call
For Bob, the driver's dog.

== Collar ==
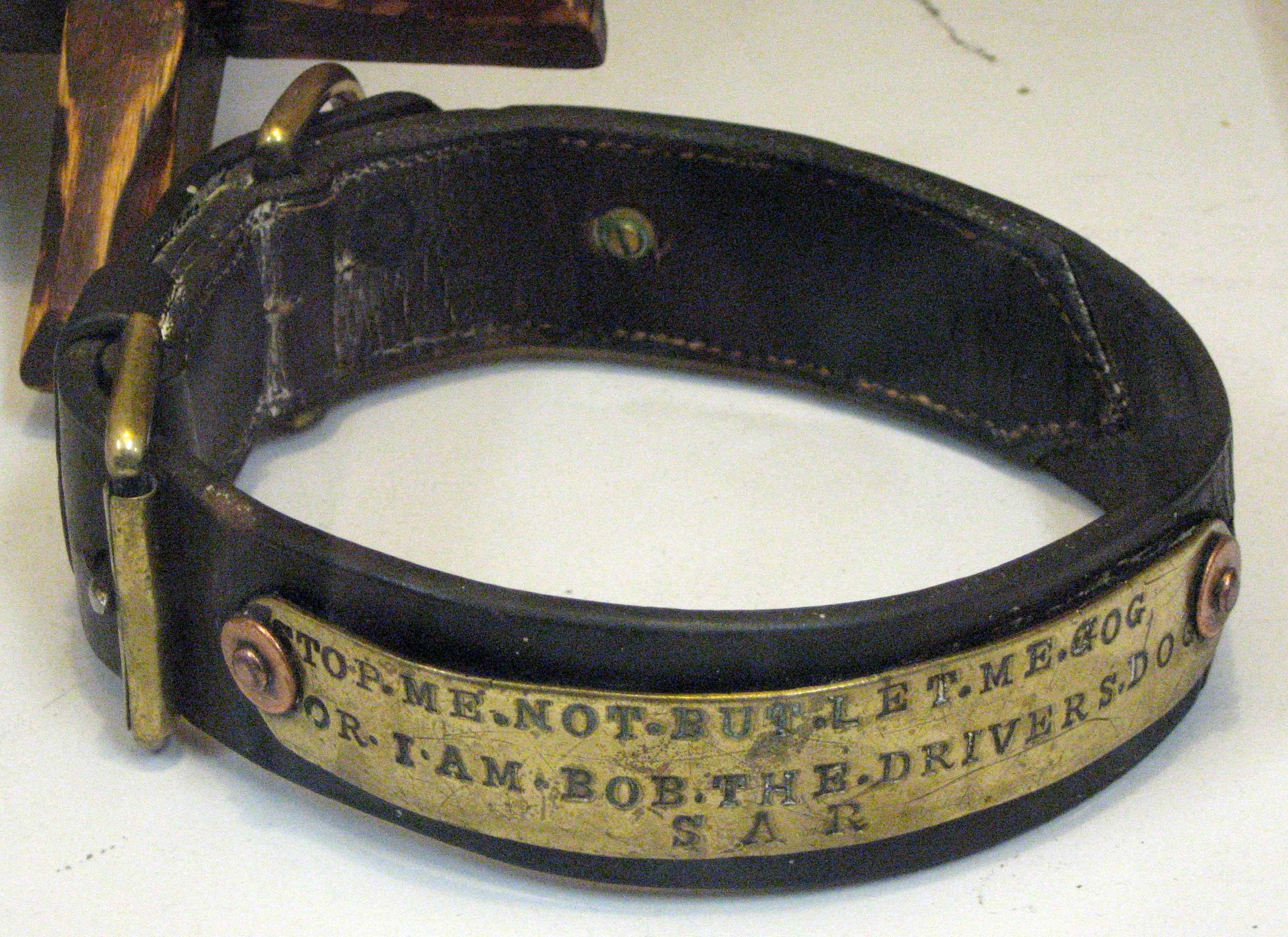
Bob's collar on display at NRM Adelaide

Bob was provided with a collar bought by a commercial traveller who had taken a fancy to him after he had been "dognapped" by a farmer. In addition to two tags, two brass plates were rivetted to the collar itself. They were inscribed with:

Stop me not, but let me jog, For I am Bob, the drivers dog

and;

Presented by McLean Bros & Ricc

It was reported that the brass plate was made by "a brass worker in the service". It has been suggested that the couplet was written by Ferry and his nephew.

Parker also notes that the railwaymen in Terowie had always maintained his registration after Ferry left (Ferry took up a role as Assistant Stationmaster with the WA Land Company at Mt Barker WA in 1889); he notes that "somebody hid him at Alberton, so I should not get him. I never saw him again after that".

== Death ==
It was reported that Bob died on 29 July 1895.The Advertiser reported he had retired to Adelaide where he was known to dine regularly at a butcher's shop, run by a Mr. Evans, in Hindley Street, until his death at the age of 17. The Chronicle notes that after his afternoon tea, Bob was "heard to bark at a passing dog, and then with a pitiful howl dropped dead". He was eulogized around the world, as far away as Great Britain, and was lauded as "the king of outcasts".

Others record that Bob lived out his days on the Silverton Tramway Company Ltd, which connected Broken Hill to the South Australian Railways, and Petersburg.

On his death, his body was preserved and later displayed at the Exchange Hotel, Adelaide. His collar was initially given to the Lord Mayor of Adelaide, but was later passed on to the Australian Federated Union of Locomotive Enginemen.

== Present ==
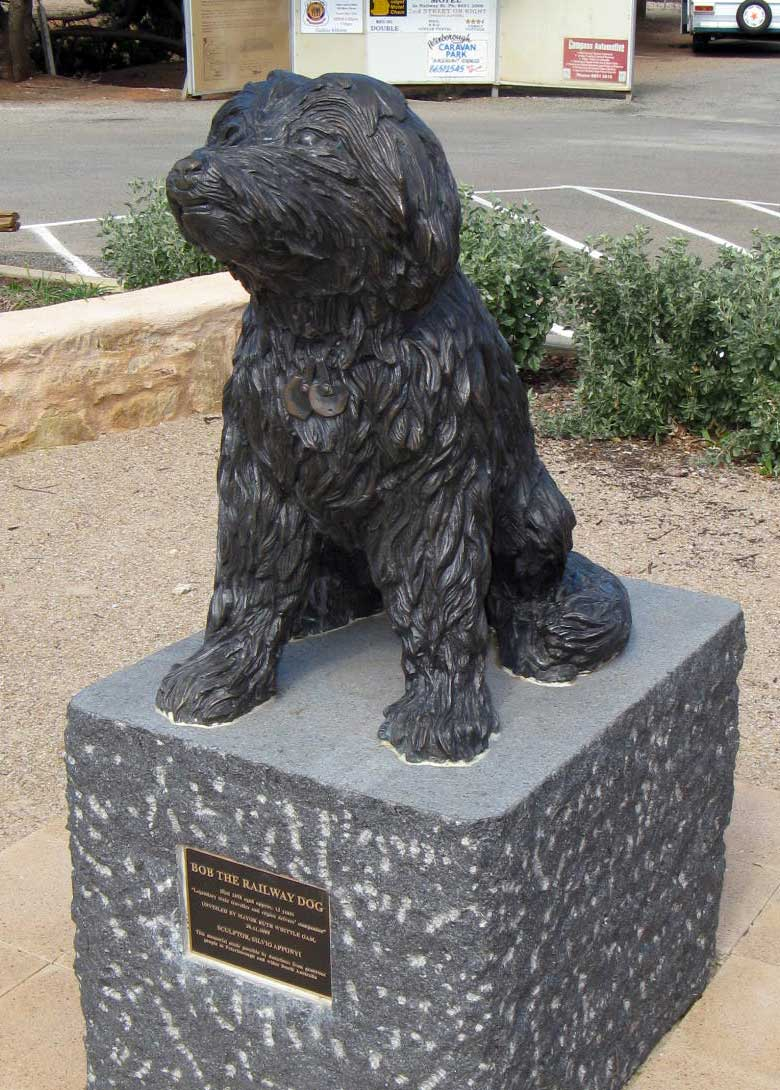
Bob's statue – Main Street, Peterborough

Bob is remembered today by railway workers and historians alike. His collar is on display in the National Railway Museum, Port Adelaide, along with photographs and other artifacts.

In 2009, the local community of Peterborough, as Petersburg is now known, raised funds for a statue of Bob. This was unveiled in November, and it is at the eastern end of Main Street.

Bob is commemorated in Terowie via a series of information boards, labelled "Bob the Railway Dog Trail", at various points of interest in the town.

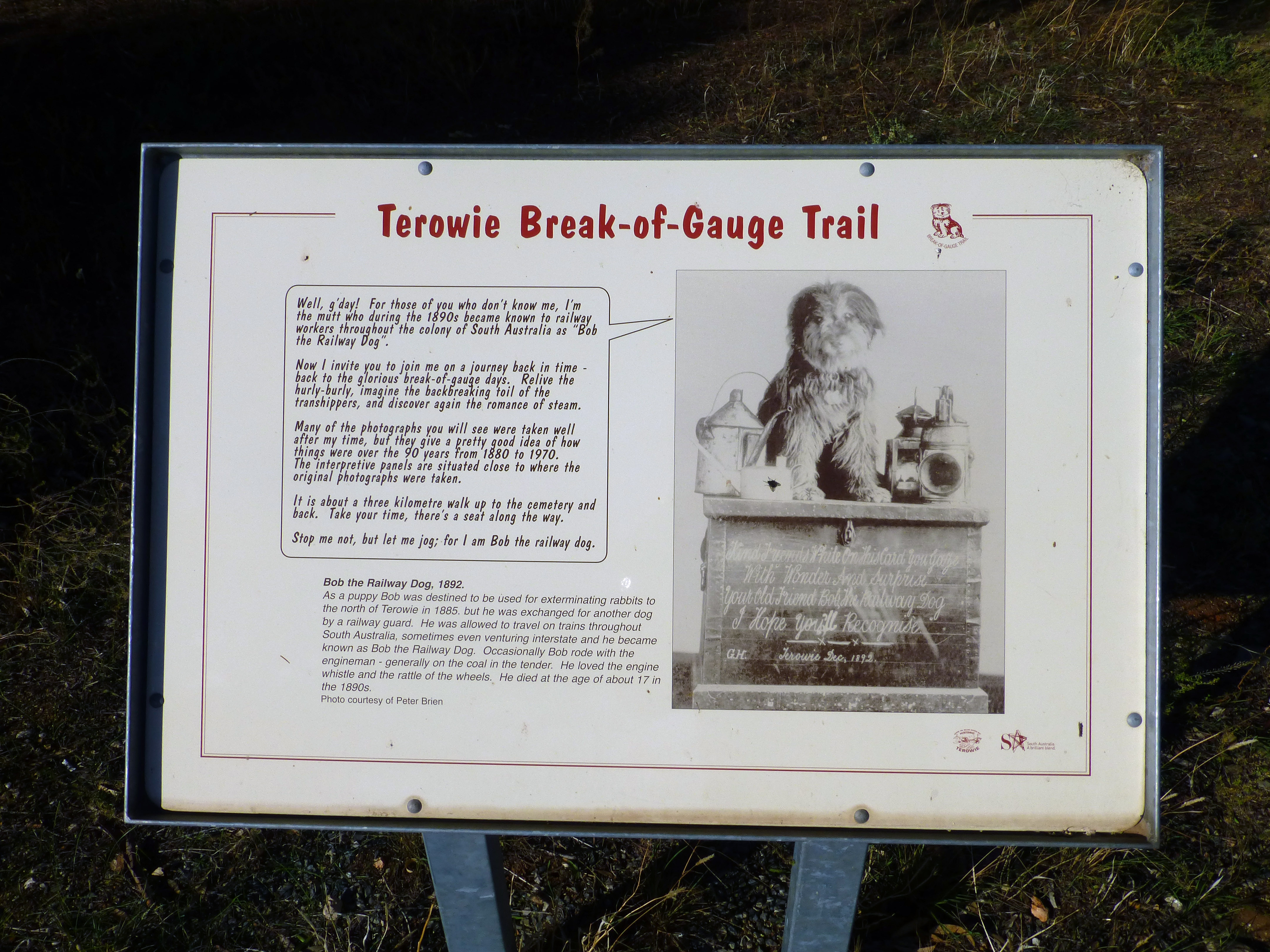
Bob's Trail – Terowie SA

Bob's story has been romanticised in a fictional work published in 2011.

== Other "Bobs" ==
Patsy Adam-Smith suggested that the couplet on Bob's collar may not be unique. She notes that correspondence in an "Adelaide paper" recalled seeing an 18th-century book which described a dog working with a fire brigade. The picture notes a similar couplet, "Stop me not but onward let me jog, for I am Bob, the London Firemans Dog."

A poem relating to Bob the Firemens Dog, published in a New Zealand newspaper in 1877, gives some credence to the story.

There was also Bob, Her Majesty's Scots Fusilier Guards Dog, and Greyfriars Bobby of Scotland, also immortalised in bronze.

Bobbie the Wonder Dog was heralded for his loyalty in a trek of 2,551 miles (4,105 km) to return to his master's home.

== See also ==
- Animals taking public transportation
- Brown Dog affair
- Dog on the Tuckerbox
- Fido (Italian dog)
- List of famous dogs
- Owney the Postal Dog, a contemporary and kindred-spirited American mascot, and also the subject of poetry.
- Red Dog, a recent independent Australian dog
- Station Jim – a popular and successful collector for the Widows' and Orphans' fund of the Great Western Railway.
- Street dogs in Moscow, train-riding dogs in Moscow

== Bibliography ==
=== Further reading ===
- Fenton, Corinne (8 November 2016). Bob the Railway Dog: The True Story of an Adventurous Dog (Hardcover). Illustrated by Andrew Mclean. United States: Candlewick Press. ISBN 9780763680978.
- Parker, Olwyn M. (2014). The Railway Dog: The True Story of an Australian Outback Dog (Paperback). Australia: Brolga Publishing. ISBN 9781922175397.
- Wilson, John (2019) [2016]. Bob's Railway: turbulent political times in South Australia and a remarkable railroading dog. John Wilson and Sarlines Railway Books.
