= Dog on the Tuckerbox =

Historical monument at Snake Gully, NSW, Australia

Coordinates: 35°00′01.84″S 148°06′39.97″E

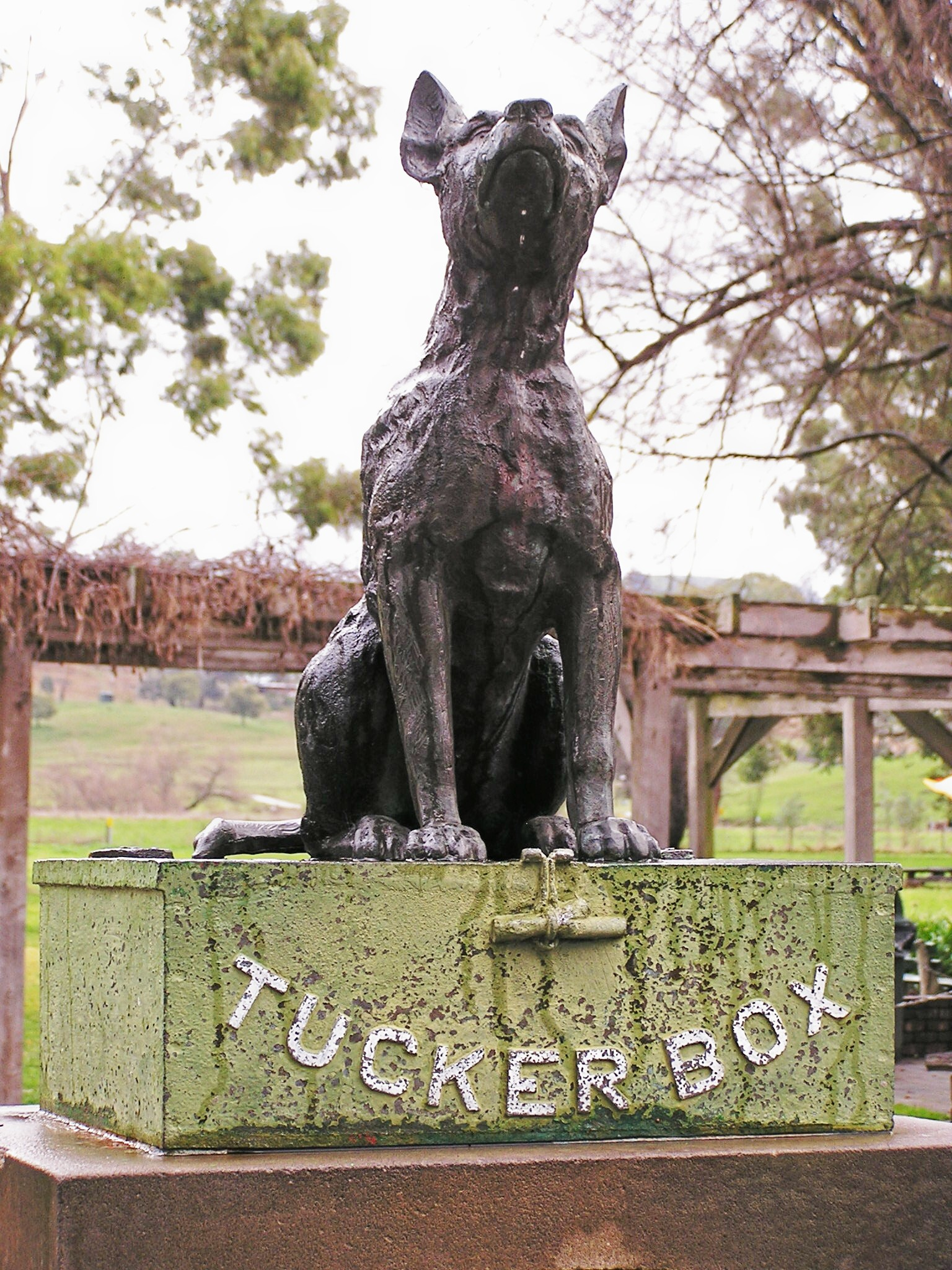
The Dog on the Tuckerbox

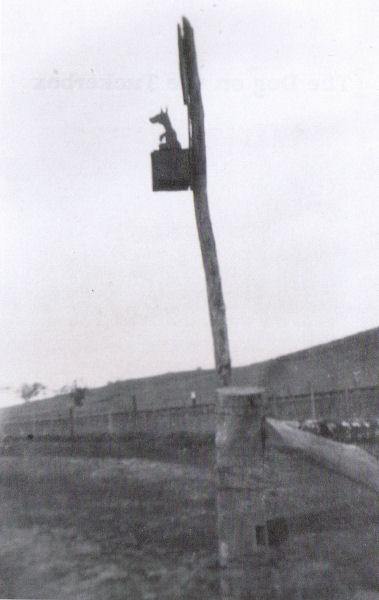
The earlier monument photographed in 1926

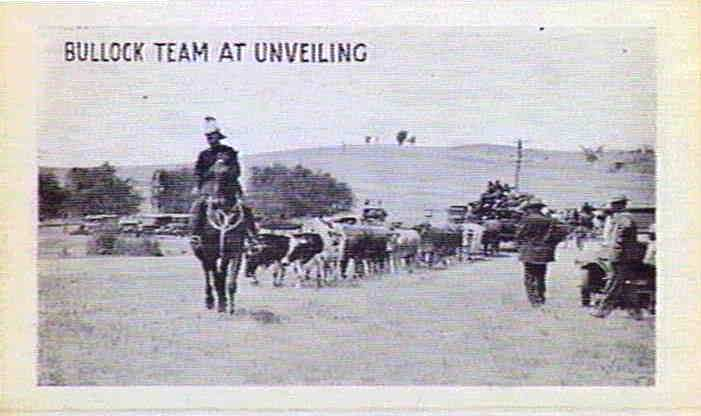
Bullock team at the unveiling of the monument in 1932

The Dog on the Tuckerbox is an Australian historical monument and tourist attraction, located at Snake Gully, approximately eight kilometres from Gundagai, New South Wales as described in the song of the same name.

== Cultural origin ==
The inspiration for the statue has been traced to a doggerel poem, "Bullocky Bill", published anonymously by "Bowyang Yorke" in 1857. Other references state that the poem was published in 1880, in the Gundagai Times, but confirmation of either date is hard to find. The poem humorously describes a series of misfortunes faced by a bullock driver, culminating in his dog either sitting on or spoiling the food in his tucker-box - an Australian colloquialism for a box that holds food, similar to a lunchbox, but larger.

BILL THE BULLOCKY
(By "Bowyang York").
As I was coming down Conroy's Gap
I heard a maiden cry:
"There goes Bill the Bullocky,
He's bound for Gundagai.
A better poor old dog
Never cracked an honest crust;
A tougher poor old dog
Never drug a whip through dust.
"His team got bogged at the five mile creek,
Bill lashed and swore and cried,
'If Nobby don't get me out of this
I'll tattoo the old dogs hide.'
But Nobby strained and broke his yoke,
And poked out the leader's eye;
And the dog sat in the tucker box
Five miles from Gundagai."

That poem was generally considered rude and vulgar, although still less so than popularly sung versions, where the dog shat in instead of sat on the tucker-box.

A less offensive and more accomplished poem by Jack Moses, published in the 1920s, made reference to the Bowyang Yorke poem although, for an unknown reason, he titled it "Nine Miles from Gundagai". Moses' poem has the dog guarding the tuckerbox by sitting on it. The poem was very popular and was the inspiration for the statue. Jack O'Hagan's song, "Where the Dog Sits on the Tuckerbox (5 miles from Gundagai)", was published in 1937, and Moses' poem was included in his collection, Nine Miles from Gundagai, published in 1938.

== The monument ==
A dog monument was first erected at a site nine miles from Gundagai in 1926.

Gundagai stonemason Frank Rusconi suggested a memorial using the legend of the Dog on the Tuckerbox in 1928; and in 1932 the proposal was taken up by the community. The Gundagai Independent of 11 August 1932 wrote:

A monument should be erected at the nine mile peg, dedicated to the pioneers and bullockys, who made the highway of to-day posible [sic], and there should be an unveiling ceremony during "Back to Gundagai Week".

The Back to Gundagai Committee chose the Five Mile camping site rather than the Nine Mile Peg as a location for the monument on the basis that it was more convenient to the Hume Highway and closer to the town, thereby more beneficial to tourism.

A nationwide competition was held to obtain the most suitable inscription for the monument. The chosen inscription on the base of the monument was written by Brian Fitzpatrick of Sydney. The inscription says:

"Earth's self upholds this monument
"To conquerors who won her when
"Wooing was dangerous, and now
"Are gathered unto her again."

The dog section of the monument was modelled by Rusconi and cast at 'Oliver's Foundry' in Sydney. The base was created by a pattern maker at Oliver’s Foundry by the name of Richard Fowler.

The Dog on the Tuckerbox monument was erected in 1932 as part of 'Back to Gundagai' week, and a large crowd "gathered to her again" to witness the unveiling by Prime Minister Joseph Lyons on 28 November 1932. It was planned to donate money placed in the wishing well at the base of the monument to the Gundagai District Hospital. A souvenir shop was also opened nearby. Copyright on the monument was vested in the Gundagai Hospital, who for many years received a useful income from receipt of royalties from firms using the iconic image.

== Later history ==
A "Dog on the Tuckerbox" festival has been held each year since 1992, the 60th anniversary of the monument. In November 2005, the annual festival included a two-day Snake Gully Cup Racing Carnival and festivities at the Dog on the Tuckerbox Centre.

The statue was vandalised on 28 July 2019 by being dislodged from its plinth, suffering minor damage, and had its grand re-unveiling on 17 August 2019 following repairs.

A more deliberate piece of vandalism was perpetrated a few months after its unveiling in 1933, when the name of Prime Minister Lyons was chiselled away from the base of the monument, presumably as a political act. Rusconi reported that the only proper repair was to take the marble slab away to be reworked.

A memorable event happened in 1981 during Stone Week celebrations at CCAE (Canberra College of Advanced Education), when students kidnapped the Dog and brought it to the College campus.

The dog was clothed with a College shirt and spent part of the day sitting on the concourse outside building 1.

== See also ==
- List of individual dogs
- Balto, sled dog
- Bob the Railway Dog, an Australian precursor
- Bobbie the Wonder Dog, journey home dog
- Hachikō, Japanese faithful dog
- Just Nuisance, Great Dane and able seaman
- Owney, postal dog
- Rags, doughboy dog
- Red Dog (Pilbara)
- Sergeant Stubby, WWI war dog
- Togo, sled dog
