= English Sheepdog =

English Sheepdog may refer (vaguely) to either of two dog breeds:

- English Shepherd
- Old English Sheepdog
