= Animals taking public transportation =

Unassisted animal use of public transport

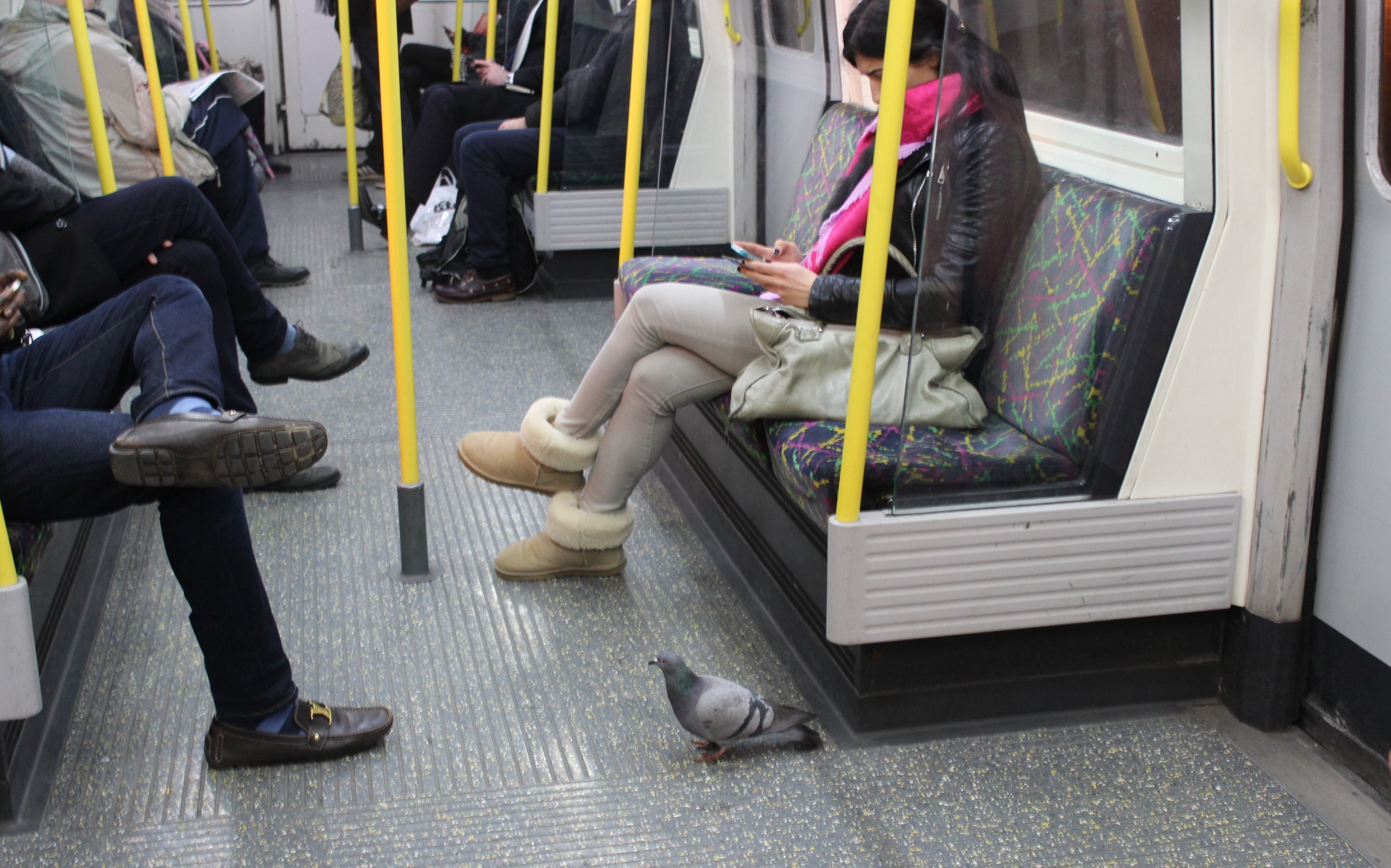
A feral pigeon travelling on a carriage on the London Underground

Some domestic pets, feral animals and wild animals have learned to use human public transportation to travel independently. This is tolerated or even celebrated by passengers, although most public transportation systems only allow service animals and forbid pets.

According to urban wildlife specialist Suzanne MacDonald, animal "commuters" are usually motivated by food and security available on the vehicle rather than its ability to take them to a destination.

== Notable examples ==
=== Food and security ===
Examples of animals relying on public transportation for food or a secure environment include:

- Boji, a street dog in Istanbul, is notable for riding all forms of public transportation, including ferries, buses, metros and trams. The Istanbul metro has reported that he visits at least 29 metro stations each day.
- Dodger, an elderly cat in Dorset, England, took round trips on several buses and was suspected to be motivated by the warmth.

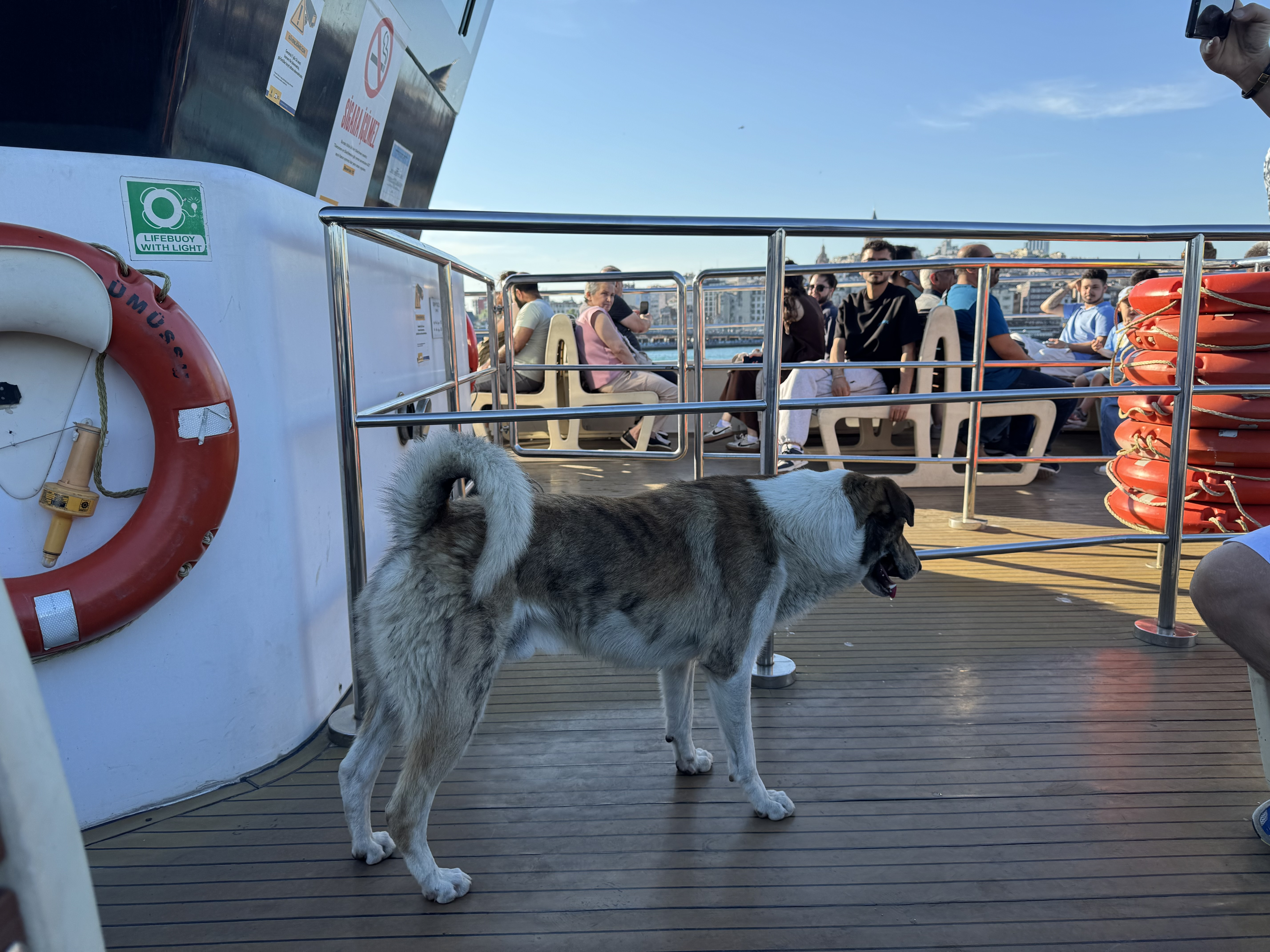
A stray dog traveling on the Eminönü-Kadıköy ferry.

- Pigeons have been reported to scavenge New York City subway trains for food. In addition, urban wild animals such as coyotes in the US and monkeys in India have been spotted on public transportation, although they are typically not encouraged to return.

=== Travel ===
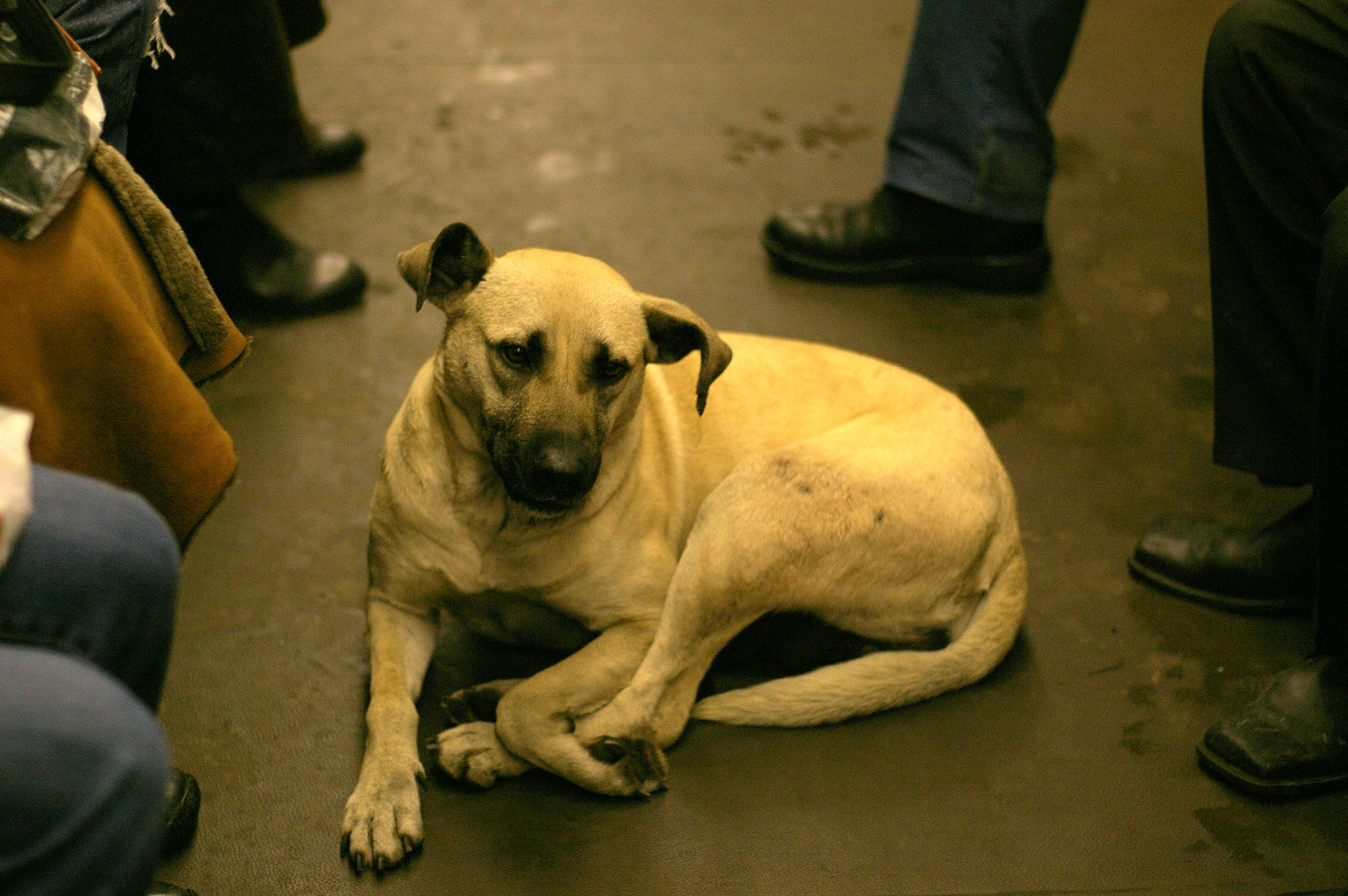
A street dog on the Moscow Metro

Animals have been observed numerous times to ride public transport as a means to reach a desired destination:

- Street dogs in Moscow use the subway as a means of transportation, and Malchik, a subway stray dog, has its own statue in Mendeleyevskaya station.
- Casper, a cat in Plymouth, England took 11-mile (18 km) round trips to the city centre via bus. His owner authored a children's book about his exploits, Casper the Commuting Cat.
- Eclipse, a black labrador in Seattle, would occasionally ride the bus ahead of its owner when eager to get to the dog park.
- Ratty, a Jack Russell terrier in Yorkshire, England, traveled 5 mi (8.0 km) by bus to be fed at two pubs.
- Macavity, a cat in Walsall, rode the bus 400 m (1,300 ft) several times a week to a destination near a fish and chip shop.
- Canuck the Crow, a northwestern crow, took the SkyTrain in Vancouver, British Columbia, Canada several days a week to forage in different stations with little effort.
