= Owney (dog) =

Late 1800s U.S. Railway Mail Service mascot

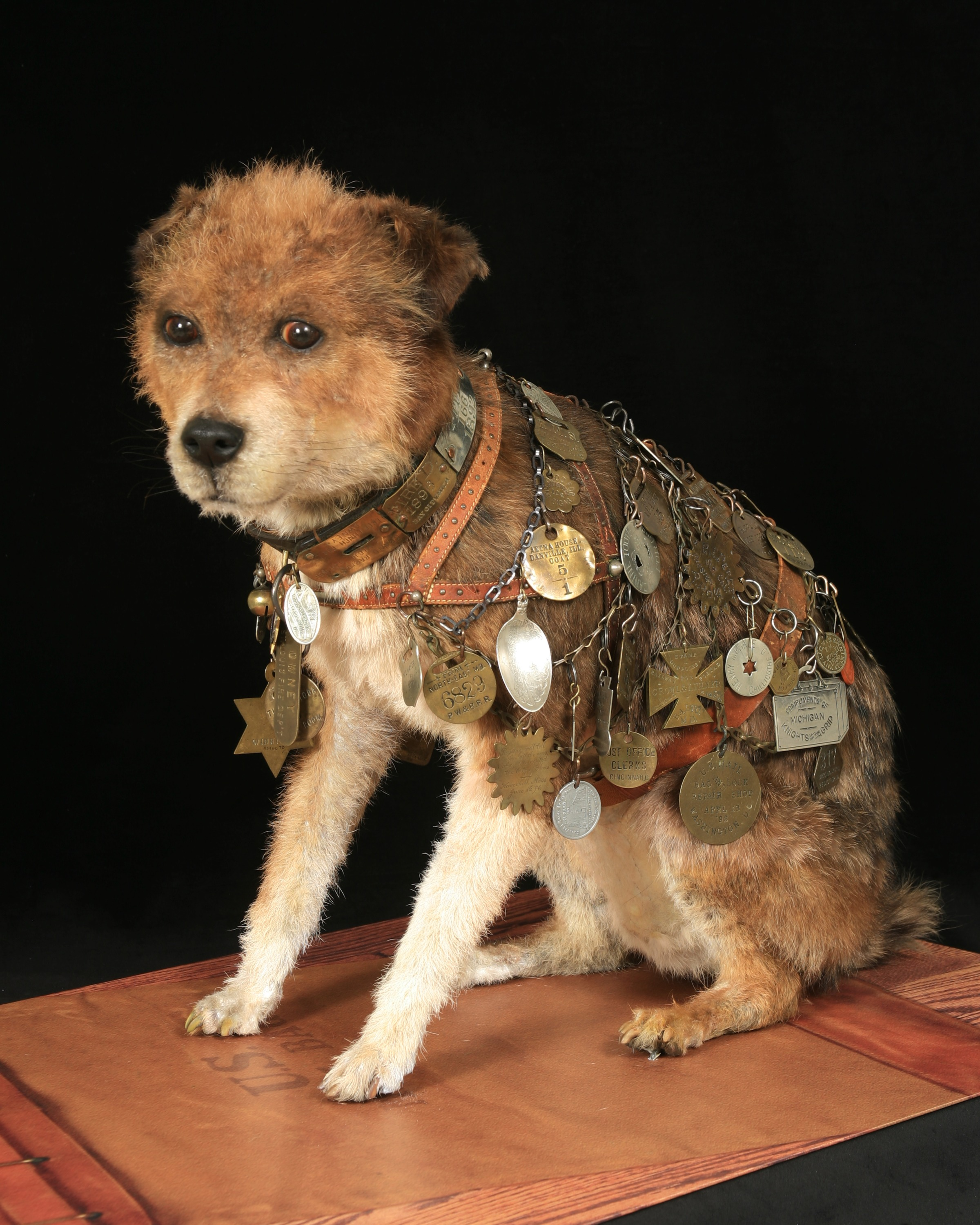
- Owney displayed at the National Postal Museum
- Other names: Owney, the Postal Dog
- Species: Canis familiaris
- Breed: Terrier mix
- Sex: Male
- Died: June 11, 1897 (aged 10 est.); Toledo, Ohio
- Resting place: Smithsonian Institution; 38.898°N 77.008°W
- Occupation: Railway Mail Service, Railway Post Office Guardian, Traveller
- Employer: U.S. Post Office
- Notable role: Companion
- Years active: 1887–1897
- Owners: Mail Clerk, Albany, New York
- Awards: 1,017 medals

Owney (ca. 1887 – June 11, 1897) was a terrier mix adopted in the United States as a postal mascot by the Albany, New York, post office about 1888. The Albany mail professionals recommended the dog to their Railway Mail Service colleagues, and he became a nationwide mascot for nine years (1888–1897). He traveled over 140,000 miles throughout the 48 contiguous United States and around the world as a mascot of the Railway Post Office and the United States Postal Service. He was the subject of commemorative activities, including a 2011 U.S. postage stamp.

== Story ==
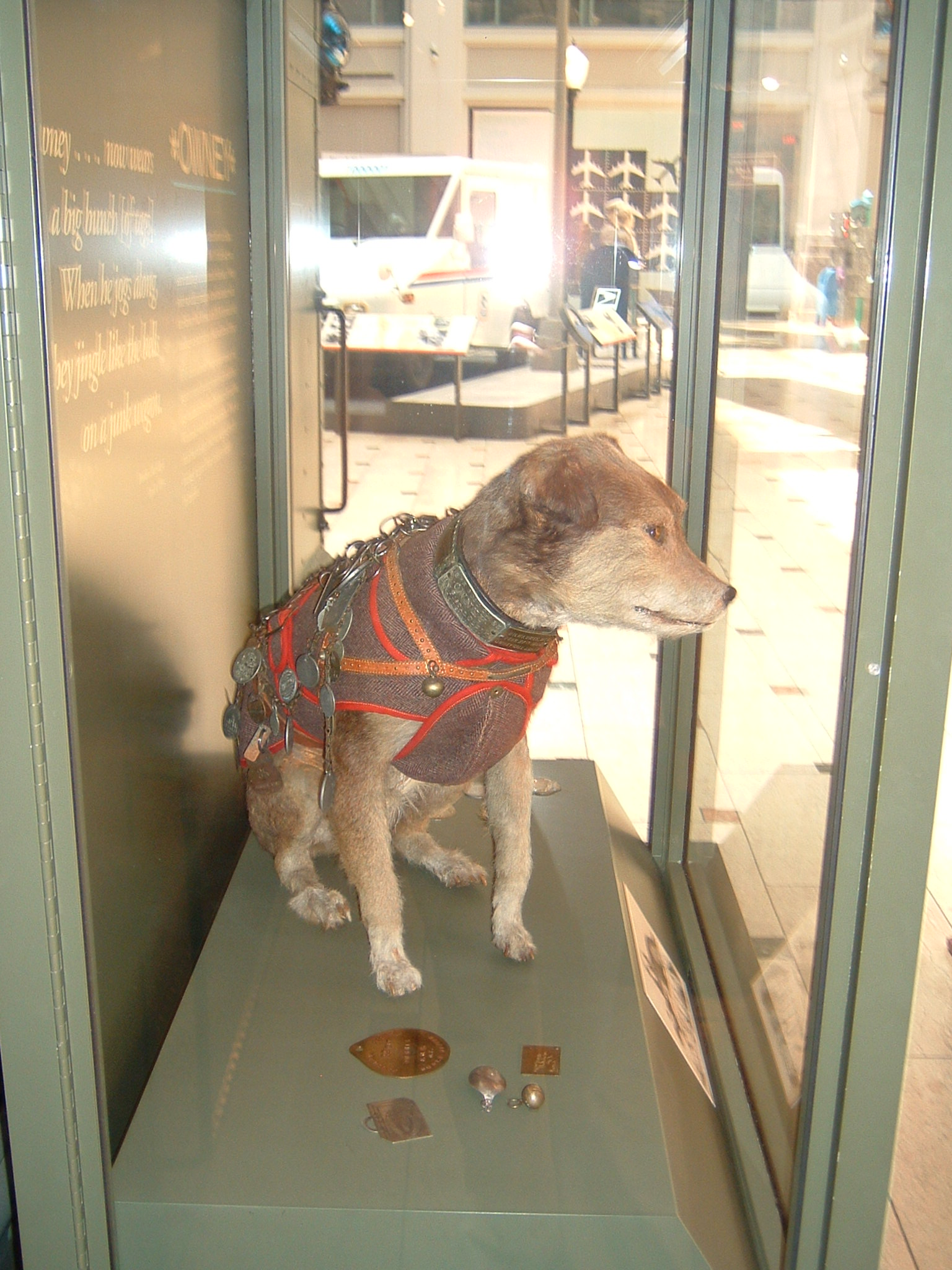
Owney's preserved body is on display at the Smithsonian National Postal Museum (NPM) in Washington, D.C.

=== Unofficial mascot ===
Owney belonged to a clerk at the Albany post office who would often come with him to work. Owney seemed to love the smell of the mail bags and would often sleep on them. The clerk quit the Albany post office but knew that Owney was happier there with the mail bags.

Owney continued to sleep on the bags and would ride on trains wherever they were taken. He was considered to be good luck by postal railway clerks, since no train he rode on was ever in a wreck. He was a welcome addition in any railway post office; he was a faithful guardian of railway mail and the bags holding it, and would not allow anyone other than mail clerks to touch the bags.

This was an important duty and Owney was well-situated for it, as the Albany train station was a key division point on the New York Central railroad system, one of the two largest railroads in the U.S. at that time. Mail trains from Albany rolled eastward to Boston, south to New York City, and westward to Buffalo, Cleveland, Toledo, Chicago, and points further west. As a contemporary book recounted: "The terrier 'Owney' travels from one end of the country to the other in the postal cars, tagged through, petted, talked to, looked out for, as a brother, almost. But sometimes, no matter what the attention, he suddenly departs for the south, the east, or the west, and is not seen again for months." In 1893 he was feared dead after having disappeared, but it turned out he was involved in an accident in Canada.

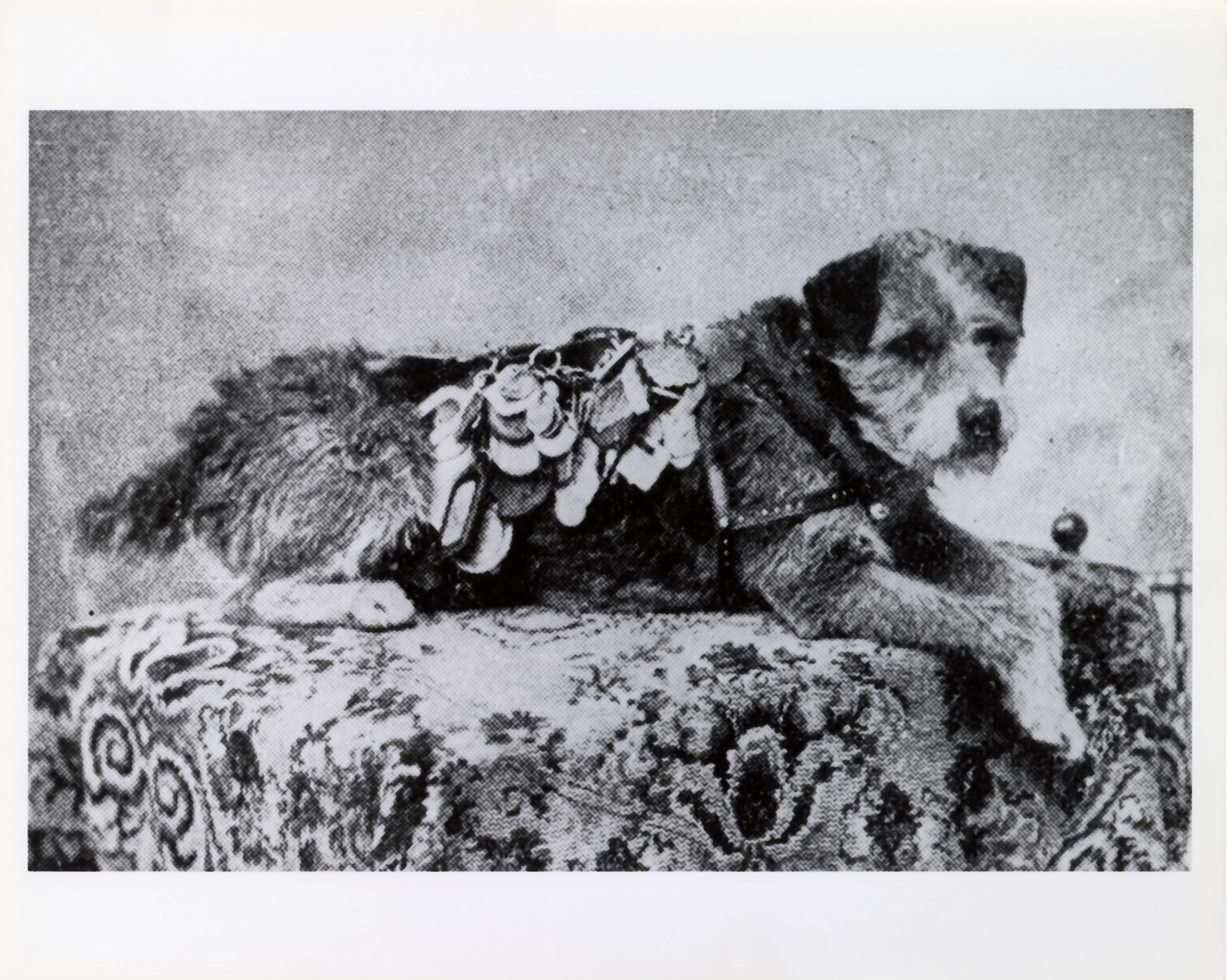
Owney with some of his dog tags

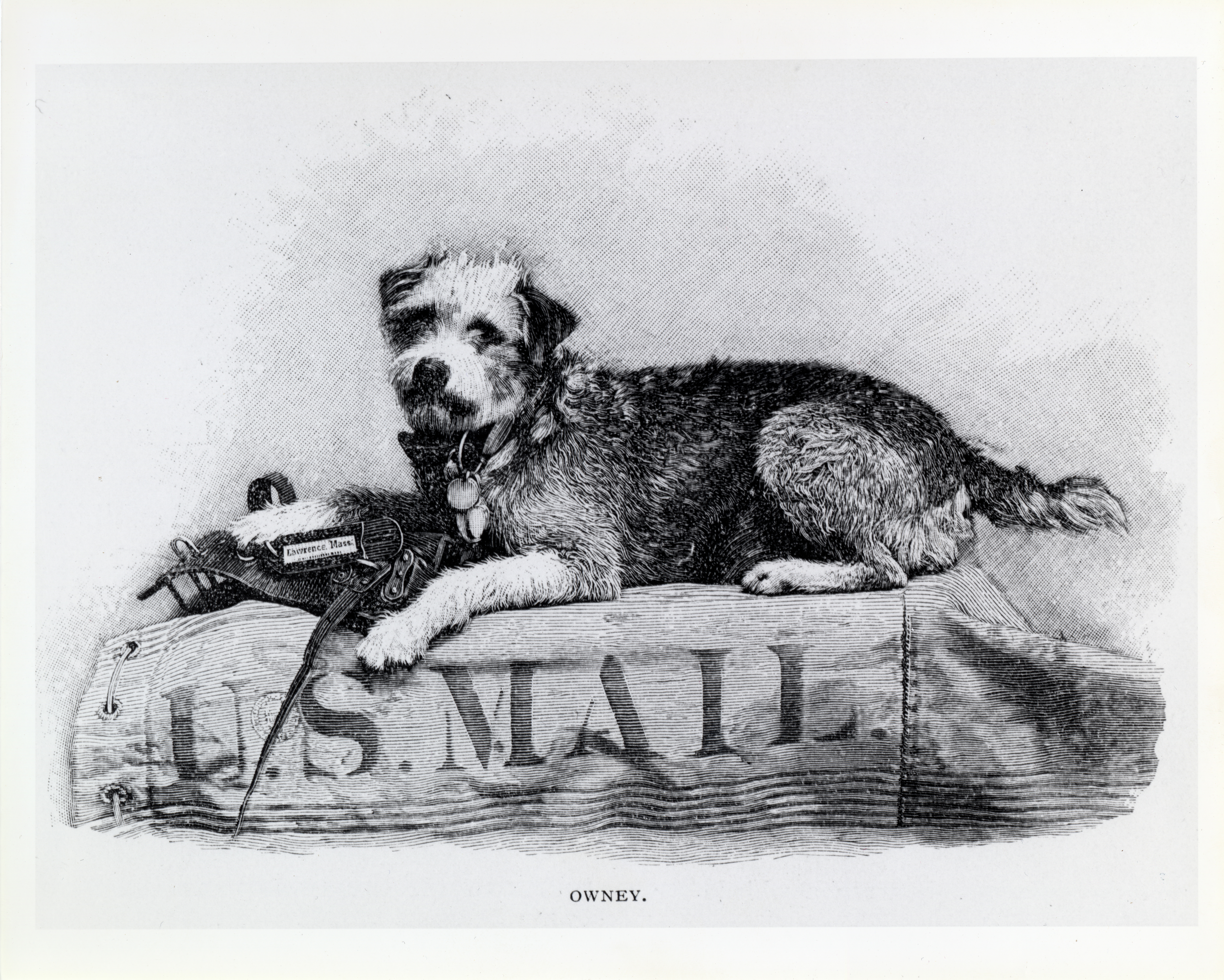
Owney on mail pouch

As Owney's trips grew longer, the postal clerks at Albany became concerned for his safety. To ensure that he could be returned if he became lost, they bought him a dog collar with a metal tag that read: "Owney, Post Office, Albany, New York". Other post offices would attach tags of their own to his collar as he visited them. The collar and tags made the mixed-breed terrier the unofficial mascot of the U.S. Railway Mail Service, and as shown by the 2011 postage stamp issued in his honor, his identifications became an essential element of his identity.

Owney received tags everywhere he went, and as he moved they jingled like sleigh bells. As the tags accumulated, he was given a jacket to hold them so that their weight would not injure his neck or shoulders. Once the tags became too heavy for Owney to carry even with the help of the jacket, clerks adding tags would remove others and forward them to Albany or Washington D.C. for safekeeping. One source suggests that 1,017 medals and tokens were bestowed upon the mascot, but the exact number is unknown. Some of these tags did not survive; the National Postal Museum currently has 372 Owney tags in its collections. Other Owney tokens, trinkets, and medals are also in the NPM collection and are displayed there.

=== International mail ===
One of Owney's more famous trips was to Montreal, Quebec, Canada. The city postmaster kept him in a kennel, incurring a total expense of $2.50 for his care and feeding, and sent a request to Albany for reimbursement. Once the money had been collected, Owney was sent home.

The Universal Postal Union was created by treaty in 1874 to standardize the shipping and handling of international mail; adherence to this pact by an increasing number of countries around what was then called the "civilized world" made it possible to extend Owney's horizons a bit. In 1895, the terrier enjoyed an around-the-world trip, riding with mail bags aboard trains and steamships. Starting from Tacoma, Washington, on August 19, he traveled for four months throughout Asia and across Europe, before returning to New York City on December 23 and from thence to Albany. Upon his return during Christmas week, the Los Angeles Times reported that he visited Asia, North Africa, and the Middle East. Another report claimed the Emperor of Japan awarded the dog two passports and several medals bearing the Japanese coat of arms. Owney's triumphant return to American shores was covered by newspapers nationwide. Owney became world famous after the trip, even though he broke no speed records in doing it.

=== Death and honors ===
As Owney aged, Post Office management came to believe that his traveling days were over. Mail clerk J. M. Elben, of St. Louis, agreed to take him in, and the influential Chicago manager of the Railway Mail Service, using insulting language to refer to the "mongrel cur", asked his employees not to allow him to ride on future mail trains. Owney had by this time traveled more than 143,000 miles (230,000 km) in his lifetime.

The exact details of the incident which led to Owney's death are unclear. Newspapers around the country carried the story of Owney's death. They reported that Owney had been ill and had become aggressive in his old age. In June 1897, after allegedly attacking a postal clerk and a U.S. Marshal in Toledo, Ohio, Owney was shot and killed on the orders of the local postmaster. The Chicago Tribune termed it "an execution". The contemporary accounts suggest that a postal clerk in Toledo chained Owney to a post in the corner of a basement at a post office in Toledo, which was not his normal treatment. That clerk then called in a reporter for the local paper to get a story. Owney may not have been used to that treatment and that may have contributed to his aggression. Whatever the reason, it is not disputed that Owney was put down in Toledo on 11 June 1897.

Owney's death symbolized a gap between the attitudes of U.S. postal clerks and their management. The 1890s were a foundational decade for the new discipline of scientific management, with consultants like Frederick Winslow Taylor seeking to help managers reduce what they saw as industrial inefficiencies by examining workers' "wasted time" and "slacking". Postal clerks used Owney's death, and the expressions of sadness contained in press obituaries in honor of the dog, to make a statement: "Postal clerks refused to bury their beloved mascot. Clerks across the country asked that the dog receive the honor they considered he was due by being preserved and presented to the Post Office Department's headquarters." Owney's remains were preserved and sent for taxidermy. In 1904, Owney's effigy was displayed by the Postal Service at the St. Louis World's Fair. A commemorative silver spoon was commissioned by Cleveland, Ohio postal workers and fashioned by "Webb C. Ball Co. Cleveland.O."

Owney is the subject of an exhibit at the Smithsonian Museum. He was sent there in 1911, and has been called one of the museum's "most interesting" artifacts. (Note: The Smithsonian has 137 million artifacts, works of art and specimens in its collection. Porter, Jessica. "Smithsonian Snapshot: Owney the Dog, 1911". Smithsonian Institution. Archived from the original on June 23, 2012.) His remains deteriorated over the intervening century, and were (along with associated artifacts) given an extensive makeover in 2011. (Note: The National Postal Museum is rated "worth a detour". "Owney, Stuffed Dog Postal Mascot". Roadside America. Archived from the original on July 30, 2012.) One of the Smithsonian's employees opined the makeover a success, and called its culmination "the big reveal".

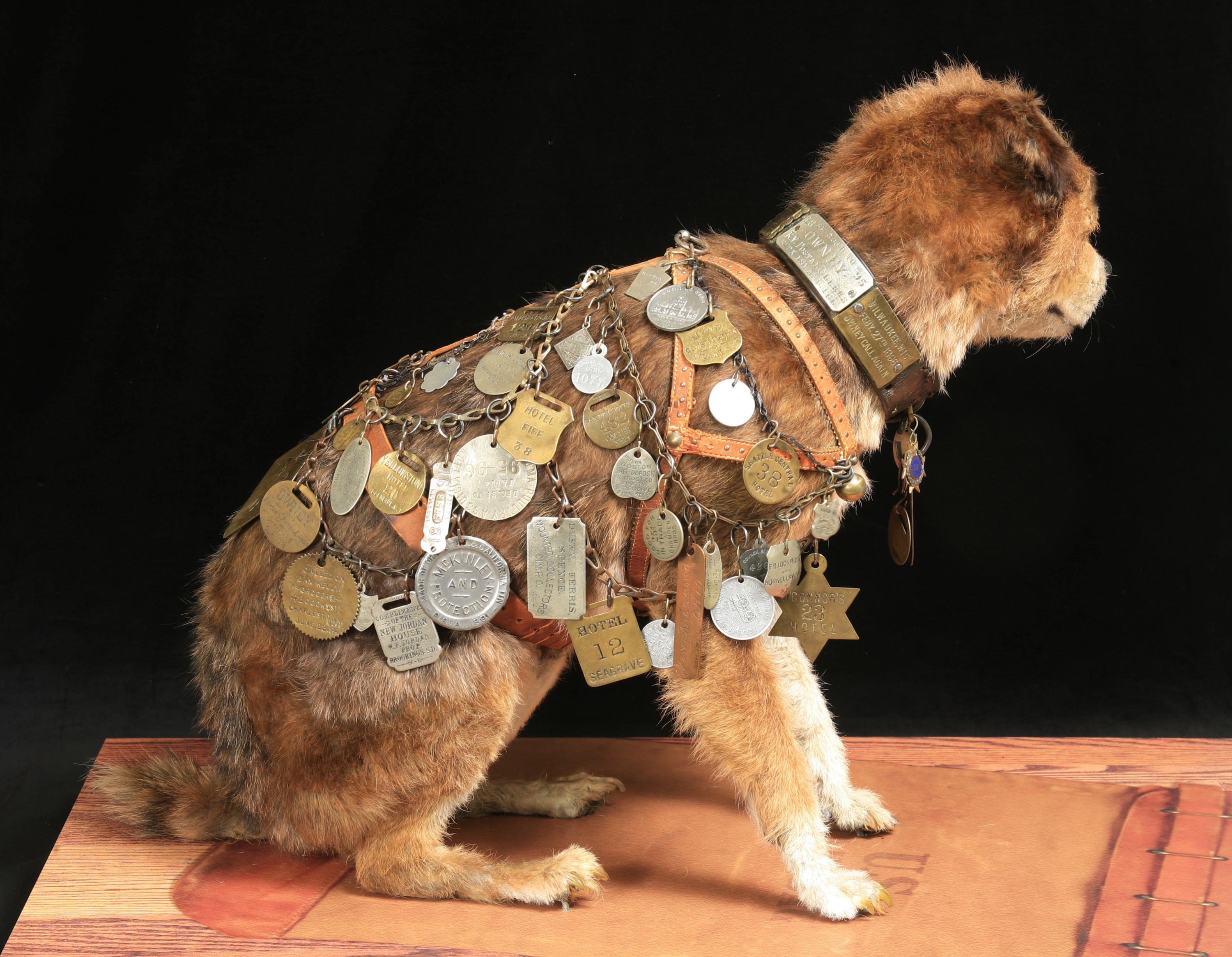
Medals displayed on Owney at the National Postal Museum.

On July 27, 2011, the United States Postal Service issued a forever stamp honoring Owney. Artist Bill Bond said he wanted to render the dog "in a spirited and lively" presentation, and that he wound up working from the mounted remains, as numerous trips to dog parks left him uninspired. Owney was also honored locally at the Albany, New York post office. The stamp was also central to an augmented reality app for Windows, Apple iPhone, iPad 2 and iPod Touch.

Like his contemporary Australian counterpart—Bob the Railway Dog, active from 1881–1894—he was the subject of poetry. One was from a clerk in Detroit:

Owney is a tramp, as you can plainly see.
Only treat him kindly, and take him 'long wid ye."

Another was penned by a clerk in Minnesota:

"On'y one Owney, and this is he;
the dog is aloney, so let him be."

Owney is featured in six books, including a digital edition published by the Smithsonian Institution's National Postal Museum in 2012. Owney: Tales from the Rails, written by Jerry Rees with songs by Stephen Michael Schwartz and illustrations by Fred Cline, is narrated by Trace Adkins, who also performs the songs.

== See also ==
- List of individual dogs
- Balto, sled dog
- Bob the Railway Dog
- Bobbie the Wonder Dog, journey home dog
- Dog on the Tuckerbox
- Hachikō, Japanese faithful dog
- Just Nuisance, Great Dane and able seaman
- Rags, mixed breed terrier who became a dog-mascot in World War I
- Red Dog (Pilbara)
- Sergeant Stubby, a Boston bull terrier, the most decorated war dog of World War I and the only dog to be nominated for rank and then promoted to sergeant through combat. Among other exploits, he is said to have captured a German spy. Also on display at the Smithsonian. He was also a mascot at Georgetown University.
- Station Jim – a popular and successful collector for the Widows' and Orphans' fund of the Great Western Railway.
- Togo, sled dog

== Bibliography ==
=== Sources ===
- "Owney, the Railway Mail Dog". Topics in Chronicling America. Library of Congress.
- Biemiller, Carl L. (2000) [1966]. Any Friend of Owney's. Putnam Publishing Group. ISBN 978-0-399-60032-6.
- Cushing, Marshall (1893). The Story of Our Post Office: The Greatest Government Department in all its Phases. Boston, Massachusetts: A. M. Thayer & Co. p. 84 – via Internet Archive.
- Hall, Lynn (1977). Owney:The Traveling Dog. Champaign, Illinois: Olympic Marketing Corp. ISBN 978-0-8116-4860-8.
- Kelly, Irene (2005). A Small Dog's Big Life: Around the World With Owney. New York: Holiday House. ISBN 978-0-8234-1863-3.
- Kerby, Mona; Barasch, Lynne, illustrator (2008). Owney, the Mail Pouch Pooch. New York: Farrar, Straus and Giroux. ISBN 978-0-374-35685-9. Archived from the original on 2012-06-30.
- Neumann, Tanja (2015). "Vom Streuner zum Maskottchen – Owney, der Bahnposthund". Das Archiv: Magazin für Post-und Telekommunikationsgeschichte (in German) (1). Heft: 50–53. ISSN 1611-0838.
- Rees, Jerry; Schwartz, Stephen Michael (2011). "Owney: Tales from the Rails". National Postal Museum Smithsonian Institution. Archived from the original (E-book) on December 12, 2013. Free children's E-book narrated and sung by Trace Adkins.
- Wales, Dirk (2003). A Lucky Dog: Owney, U.S. Rail Mail Mascot. Chicago, Illinois: Great Plains Press. ISBN 978-0-9632459-0-8.
