= Boji (dog) =

Dog known for riding public transport in Istanbul, Turkey

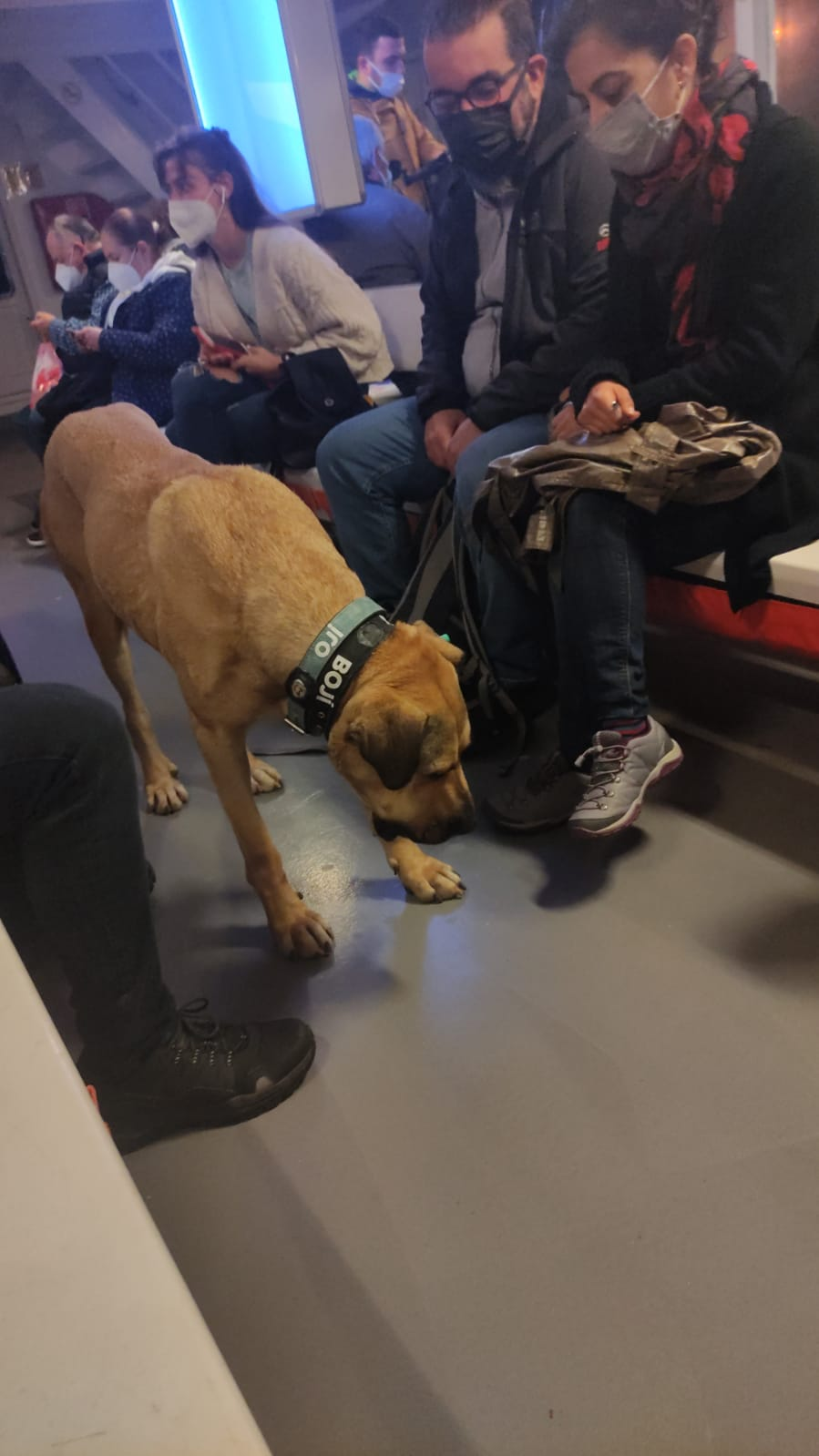
- Species: Dog
- Sex: Male
- Years active: 2021
- Known for: Using public transport in Istanbul
- Owner: Ömer Koç
- Weight: 42 kg (93 lb)

Boji is a street dog in Istanbul, Turkey, known for regularly riding on the city's public transport. He is described as being an "Anatolian shepherd mix" and having "golden-brown fur, dark eyes and floppy ears". He makes use of buses, metro trains, trams, and ferries. He is one of several examples of animals taking public transportation.

City officials arranged for him to be vaccinated, and be fitted with a microchip which enables them to track where he has been. They found him to use up to 29 metro stations in a day, travelling up to 30 kilometres (20 miles). On one occasion he reached the Princes' Islands.

His name is the Turkish word for bogie.

His adventures first came to public notice in mid 2021. A spokesperson for Metro Istanbul said:

We noticed a dog using our metros and trains and he knows where to go. He knows where to get out... It's like he has a purpose.

A Twitter account is operated in Boji's name, with tweets in Turkish and English, and with almost 60,000 followers as of 6 October 2021. There is also an Instagram account. Many people post pictures of him, or selfies with him, to their own social media channels.

Boji was adopted by Ömer Koç in 2022 after an image with feces on a tram seat was shared on social media with the title "IBB's permanent dog BOJI defecated on the tram". IBB Spokesperson Murat Ongun shared a video on the same social media channel, taken by tram security cameras, showing a person putting feces he had brought with him on the seat. It was revealed that Boji was in the shelter during the day of the incident.

In March 2024, Boji was spotted out in public again, this time in London with Koç on a London bus.
