= Koolie =

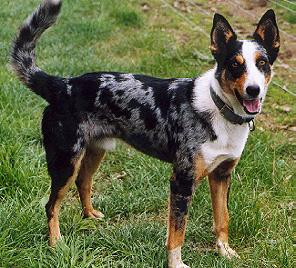
- A Blue Merle short coat Koolie.
- Other names: Australian Koolie; German Koolie; Coulie; German Collie
- Origin: Australia
- Breed status: Not recognized as a breed by any major kennel club.
- Notes: Australian Koolies have been recognised on the Australian Sporting Registrar, the American Herding Breed Association's Registrar and the New Zealands Obedience Registrar. Koolies registered with the Koolie Club of Australia are accepted to the Canine Control Sporting registers in Victoria, New South Wales and Queensland.

The Koolie (also known as the Australian Koolie or by the historic misnomer "German Coolie") is an Australian dog breed. The Koolie is a working or herding dog which has existed in Australia since the early 19th century when it was bred from imported British working dogs. Robert Kaleski, in an article on Cattle Dogs in the August 1903 issue of the Agricultural Gazette of New South Wales, describes the "Welsh heeler or merle, erroneously known as the German collie," as a "blue-gray dog about the size and build of a smooth-haired collie, generally with wall eyes." The British background predominated in the dogs that came to be associated with the "German collie" name.

There is substantial variation in the Koolie population, as Koolies were bred to exhibit different characteristics in different regions. The breed is based on its ability to work rather than on its conformation. However, most Koolie breeders refer to the Koolie as a breed rather than as a type, and assert that it "breeds true", with various types or strains.

The Koolie is a "herding dog", one which has a natural instinct to circle widely round sheep and bring them back to their owner. Koolies are known as silent, upright, working dogs. They are used for herding sheep and also for quiet careful work at close quarters at lambing time or for "shedding" (cutting out) sheep.

With the demand for farming dogs no longer being what it was, the Koolie is used in many other fields, where it is valued for its sensitivity, athleticism and obedience. Koolies are used in agility, tracking, therapy, disability and emotional support services, and as companion dogs, provided they are well trained.

== Description ==
=== Appearance ===
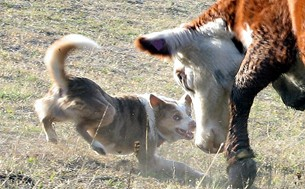
A Red Merle short coat blocking cattle.

The Koolie is as diverse as the country it originates from, Australia. In the north of Queensland and New South Wales they are tall, medium boned and agile, bred for mustering cattle over many miles. In New South Wales, they are thicker set and shorter to flush low lying cattle from the dense bush and gullies. In Victoria, one finds the smallest variety of the Koolie, primarily used for sheep. Koolies are bred to meet the needs of the stockman, grazier and farmer; all agile, all with the same ability to adapt to any situation, all with a strong willingness drive. Male Koolies stand between 17 and 20 inches (43 to 51 cm) tall at the shoulder, while females typically measure slightly smaller, ranging from 16 to 19 inches (41 to 48 cm). Most often, they are seen in the merle coat pattern, but can exhibit any combination of colour and coat lengths. The solid red or black Koolie are often mistaken for Kelpies, and some bi-coloured Koolie have been taken for Border Collies by the general public. As all of these breeds share Collie ancestry, they resemble each other.

=== Coat ===
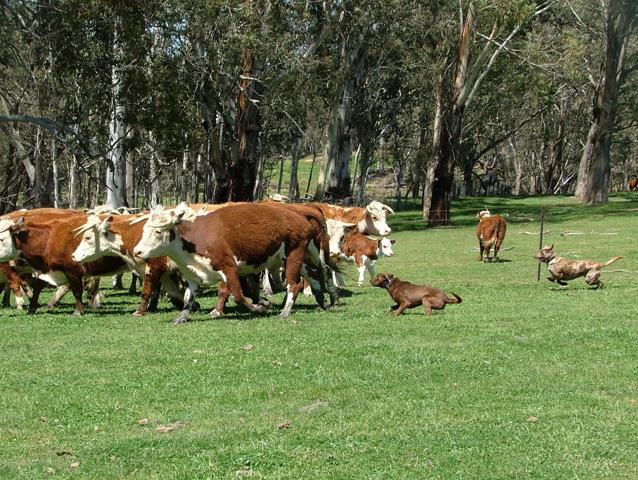
A Solid Red short coat and a Red Merle short coat mustering cattle

The Koolie coat ranges from short/smooth (like that of the original blue merle Collies from Scotland), short (like a working Kelpie), medium and, not common, long (like the show Border Collie). Koolies are typically slightly longer than tall. The majority of owners prefer the short/smooth coats as they do not pick up grass seed, and are very easy to maintain, with the occasional swim to keep the coat glossy and free of parasites.

=== Colouring ===
Koolie colours are classed as Solid or Merle.

A Solid does not show any Merle pattern, and can come in any colour such as all one colour black, red, chocolate, cream, dilute red (lilac), dilute black (blue), with tan points, black & white, dilute & white or red & white, or "Tri" -solid red or black, with white markings, normally with brown points.

Any of these can then have the Merle pattern i.e. usually with large splashes of darker colourings of red/chocolate for red merles or black/grey for blue merles. Black Koolies will commonly have a black nose with black eyes, or tones of black including blue. Red or chocolate Koolies will commonly have a red or chocolate nose with brown eyes, or tones of brown, including yellow, and there can be combinations of both black or brown with the added blue eye/s. There are also dilute colours of slate/blue for black Koolies and lilac/fawn for red Koolies. Yellow/cream can also be displayed when the dog is homozygous recessive on the "E locus." This recessive red (also known as Australian Red in some breeds) is considered a masking gene in that it prevents the production of black coat pigment (base skin pigment remains unaffected). Because of this, it is considered a masking gene that prevents the expression of the merle gene (and some others).

In 2019, many Koolie breeders took part in the research project to find a DNA test for the Merle gene, as it was believed many non Merle looking dogs could be genetically a Merle and therefore have issues when bred to a Merle.

The breeding of two Merle dogs runs a high risk (in all breeds) of sight and hearing defects in the offspring.

As a “solid” (dog not showing the Merle pattern) may still genetically be a Merle, it is vital to perform a full DNA Merle sequence test to determine the “lengths” of Merle in each dog so that the safest breeding practices are used.

=== Temperament ===
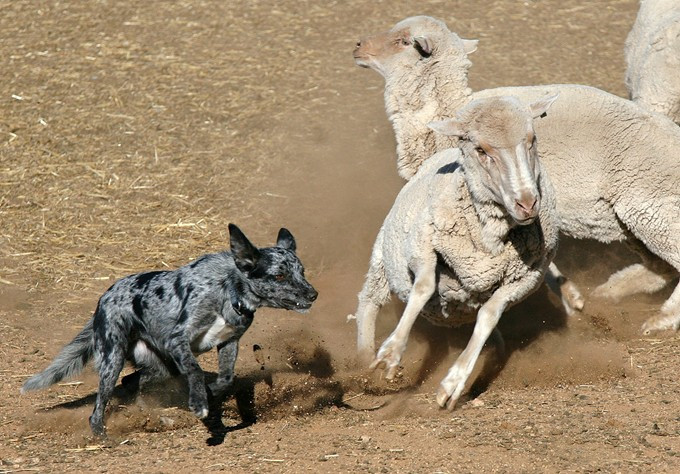
A Blue Merle short coat heading sheep

Graziers, stockmen and dairy farmers across Australia since days long past have typically selected breeds which display the abilities required to meet their working needs. The temperament found in a Koolie is a culmination of these much sought-after abilities. The optimal worker possesses a combination of working skills and bonding temperament.

Some dog owners or new enthusiasts interpret the Koolie's behavior as shy, reserved, or timid. The Koolie's temperament can be evaluated to match its skills and demeanor with an owner. Koolies require training guidance, and a consistent approach allows the animal to adapt to different situations over time.

Koolies are used in varied roles such as work situations, sporting activities, service, or companionship. They are known to be patient, temperate, dedicated, with a willingness to work. They show enthusiasm for work and hardiness when the job or circumstance requires.

Given their nature, it is paramount that pups are well trained for obedience and are given both mentally challenging goals as well as physical exercise.

== Health ==
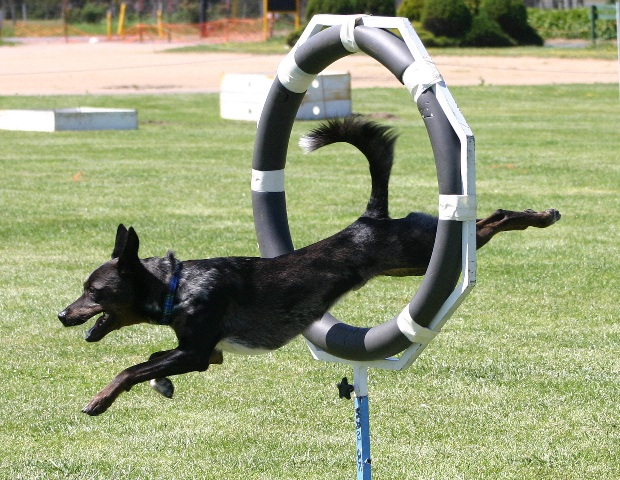
A Blue Merle short coat in Agility

The median longevity of Koolies is about 15 years, which is a typical lifespan for this breed. Koolies have a diverse but small gene pool and can suffer from the many genetic problems found in recognised breeds. Many of these problems have genetic tests currently available, but hip and elbow scoring is necessary to reduce the incidence of Hip and Elbow Dysplasia. The merle for which the Koolie is most recognised by can produce blind and/or deaf white pups, if 2 merles are bred together, so merle testing should be performed prior to breeding.

The Australian Koolie Association is the only Koolie breed registry which has mandatory DNA breed ID testing before a dog of unverified breeding can be registered and also requires all stud dogs to be fully health screened by DNA & hip and elbow dysplasia tested.

=== Medical research ===
- In 2003, DNA testing carried out on 56 individual Koolie bloodlines from Australia by Dr. Mark Neff of the University of California at Davis in the USA cleared those bloodlines tested for the presence of the mutant gene mdr1-1, which causes malfunction in the canine multidrug resistance gene; Collie bloodlines were chosen to be tested because they showed a reaction, even death, to chemicals, such as Ivermectin, used in the treatment of intestinal parasites.
- In 2004, the Koolie Club of Australia in conjunction with Genetic Science Service of Australia launched the collection and processing of Koolie DNA.
- There are several common genetic disorders that are found in the breed but which can be easily managed with safe breeding practices thanks to simple testing.
- The Australian Koolie Association has distinct sections for both purebreds and part bred Koolies, whereas other registries do not make this distinction.

== Herding technique ==
A Red Merle smooth coat backing sheep

Koolies are much sought after in rural Australia, and interest is now being shown in America, Canada, Germany, Finland, New Zealand, Switzerland and Holland. According to Geoff Broughton, past president of the Koolie Club of Australia for 7 years, the Koolie will head (move to the front or head of the stock to push them back towards you), heel or drive, (push the stock from behind), cast (move out and around the stock), block (hold the stock or block them from in front, in three sheep trials this action is called the pick up) and back (literally jump onto the backs of their charges to herd them if necessary). Koolies have a reputation for being upright workers with a good eye, who can easily shift their focus from holding the group to casting around a flock or gathering breakaways. They are not known for having "sticky eyes" (focusing on the sheep in front only). Unlike other working breeds, which are noted for their crouched form or style and preference for either yard or field work, Koolies are at ease working in closed surroundings such as yards or trucks and being out in paddocks and droving. As well as working anything from ducks to bulls, like all dogs of their kind they will herd family members and children in the absence of other charges.

Herding instincts and trainability can be measured at non-competitive herding tests. Koolies exhibiting basic herding instincts can be trained to compete in stock dog trials.

== History ==
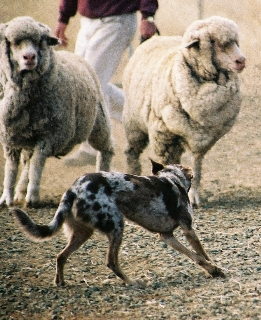
A Red Merle short coat blocking sheep

The Koolie's ancestors are thought to be the collies imported from Scotland.

During the industrial era, some bloodlines were influenced by Kelpie and Border Collie, as explained by one grazier in Western Australia, “You bred from the good workers which were around and Koolies were not always to be found, so you bred to the next best worker that was and this was either the Kelpie or Border depending on the region you lived and the stock you worked.” Many breeders still out cross both Kelpie and Border Collie lines, which are accepted practices with the Koolie breed registries.

In 2000, the Koolie Club of Australia was formed to preserve and promote the Koolie breed. Later the Working Koolie Association & Australian Koolie Association were formed as well. None of these registries actively work towards bench standard recognition, feeling this would only be detrimental to the breeds working future. As of (2013), no bench standard exists.

In 2004, the Koolie breed was recognised by the Australian Sporting Registrar, judges from the Australian National Kennel Council (ANKC) may judge Koolies in all ANKC sanctioned sporting trials. In the states of Victoria, New South Wales, and Queensland, registered Koolies may compete in, herding, obedience, tracking, jumping, gambles and dog agility events through registration on their State's Sporting Register as members of the Koolie Club of Australia or the Australian Koolie Association.

A Solid Tri short coat, U.S. import

In May 2006, the Stockdog Committee of the Australian Shepherd Club of America voted to accept the "Koolie/German Coolie" into their list of recognised and accepted herding breeds, admission was granted June 2006.

In 2006, the American Herding Breed Association accepted the Australian Koolie onto their list of recognised and accepted breeds.

== See also ==
- List of dog breeds
- Bob the Railway Dog

== Bibliography ==
- Aleta Curry (2003). "The All-Australian Dog: The Koolie", one of a series of articles appearing in The Southern Village View Magazine, © 2003.
- Koolie Club of Australia (2003). " The Reemerging Breed", one of a series of articles appearing in Dogs Life Magazine, © 2003
- Chris Howe (1996) "The Origin of the German Koolie" one of a series of articles appearing in The Working Stock Dog Magazine of Australia © 1996
- Australian Shepherd Club of America: Admissions of Koolie/German Coolie breed of Australia effective 1 June (2006) located on page 37 of ASCA Rules and regulations
- Linda Rorem, (1997) "Collie Family Tree" first published 1997 © Linda Rorem
- Carol Ann & Ernest Hartnagle "The Total Australian Shepherd: Beyond the Beginning" © 2007
- Jeanne Joy Hartnagle "All About Aussies" © 1985, 1996, 2005
- The Merle Gene (2006)- Department of Pathobiology at the College of Veterinary Medicine and Biomedical Sciences of Texas A&M University © 2006
