= Street dogs in Moscow =

Stray animals in Moscow

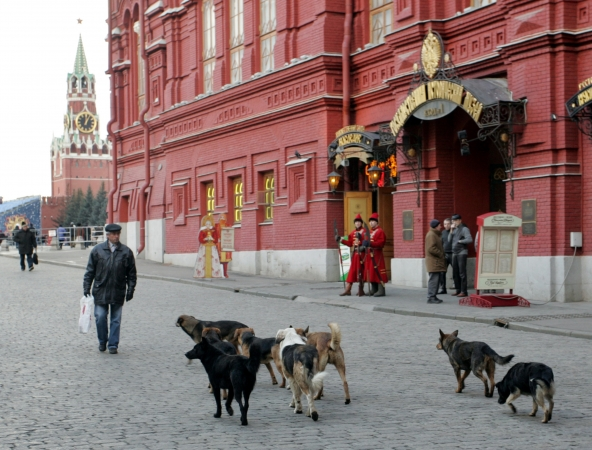
A pack of stray dogs at Red Square in Moscow

The city of Moscow, Russia, hosts a large population of free-ranging dogs. Many operate in packs and have become accustomed to seeking food from passersby. Some of them who frequent or inhabit the subway have attracted international attention for learning how to use the trains to commute between various locations. The most famous Muscovite street dog is Laika (Russian: Лайка), who ended up being one of the first animals in space and the first to orbit the Earth.

== Background ==
The issue of Moscow's stray dogs was first mentioned by Russian writers such as journalist Vladimir Gilyarovsky in the late 19th century. Their sad lot was dramatised by Anton Chekhov in the famous short story Kashtanka, by Mikhail Bulgakov in the novella Heart of a Dog, and by Gavriil Troyepolsky in the novel White Bim Black Ear. As of March 2010, there were an estimated 35,000 free-ranging dogs living within Moscow's city limits, or approximately one dog for every 300 people, and about 32 per square km (84 per square mile).

According to Andrei Poyarkov of the A.N. Severtsov Institute of Ecology and Evolution, a biologist and wolf expert who has studied Moscow's dogs for over 30 years, the quantity of food available to them keeps the total population of homeless dogs steady at between 35,000 and 50,000. Most pups don’t reach adulthood, and those that do essentially replace adults who have died. A life of more than 10 years is considered rare. Many, if not most, street dogs share certain physical similarities: medium-sized with thick fur, wedge-shaped heads and almond eyes, with long tails and erect ears.

Most dogs are born homeless; others arrive on the streets as rejected or abandoned house pets. Poyarkov estimates that fewer than 3 percent of abandoned pet dogs live long enough to breed.

Over the years that Poyarkov observed the dogs, he noticed that the population has lost such features as spotted coats, wagging tails, and friendliness, characteristics known to distinguish dogs from wolves.

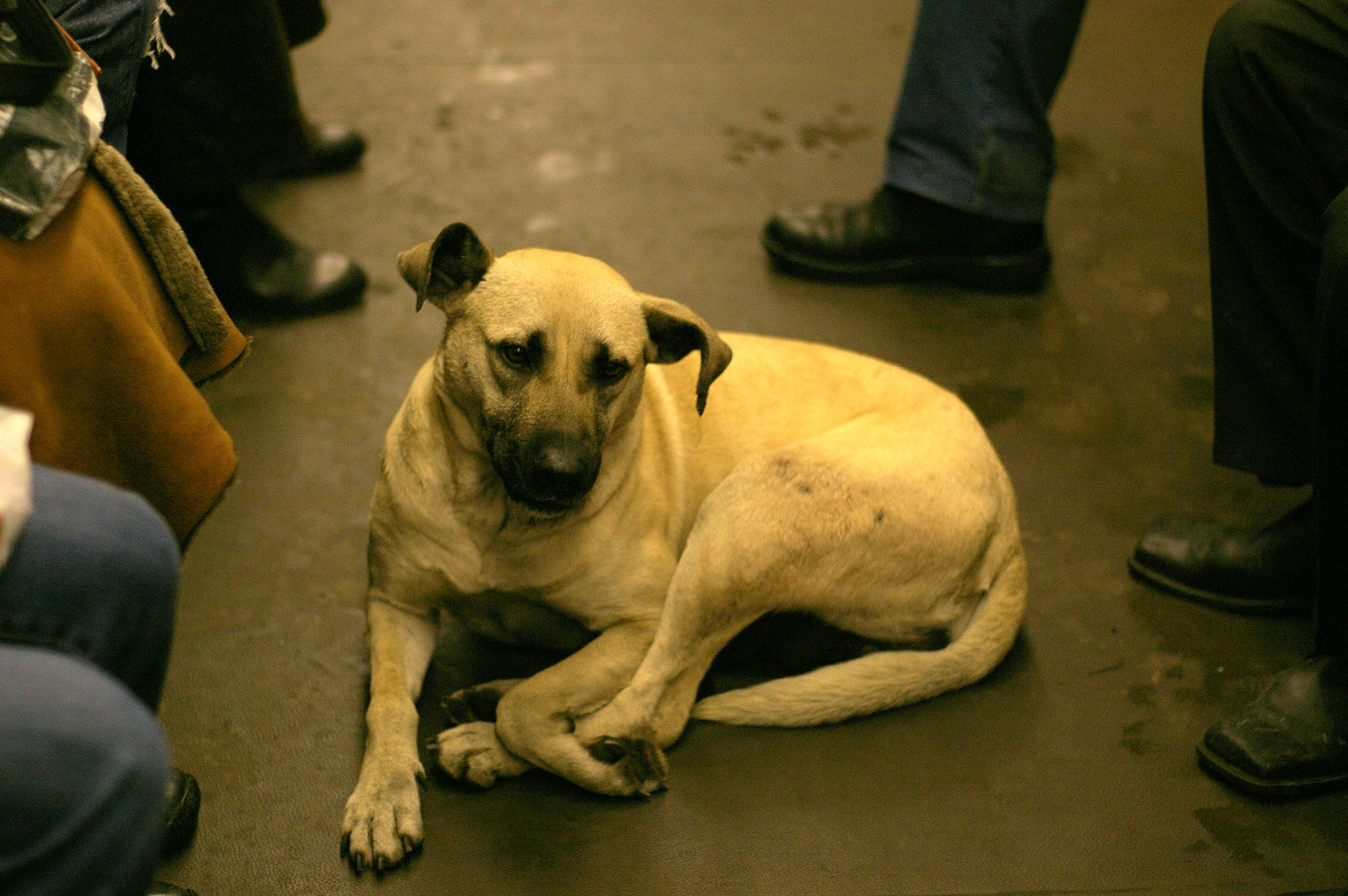
A Moscow free-roaming dog riding the Metro.

When the number of street dogs massively increased in the nineties and they began to bite humans, the dogs were hunted and killed. In recent years the attitude and strategy towards street dogs has changed. The dogs are caught and neutered, and are given enough to eat. The dogs keep the city free of food leftovers and rats. Stray dogs in Moscow have adapted their behavior to the traffic and life of Moscow. The dogs ride the Metro and understand the rules of traffic lights. The stray dogs of Moscow are often called Moscow's Metro dogs.

== Types of street dogs ==
Poyarkov classified their evolving social structures into four groups:

- Wild dogs (feral and nocturnal, avoiding humans and viewing them as a threat)
- Foragers (semi-feral)
- Beggars (the most socialized to people, but not affectionate or personally attached)
- Guard dogs (who view certain humans as their leaders. Commonly met at mills or construction yards, may be fed on a regular basis yet have no official owner).

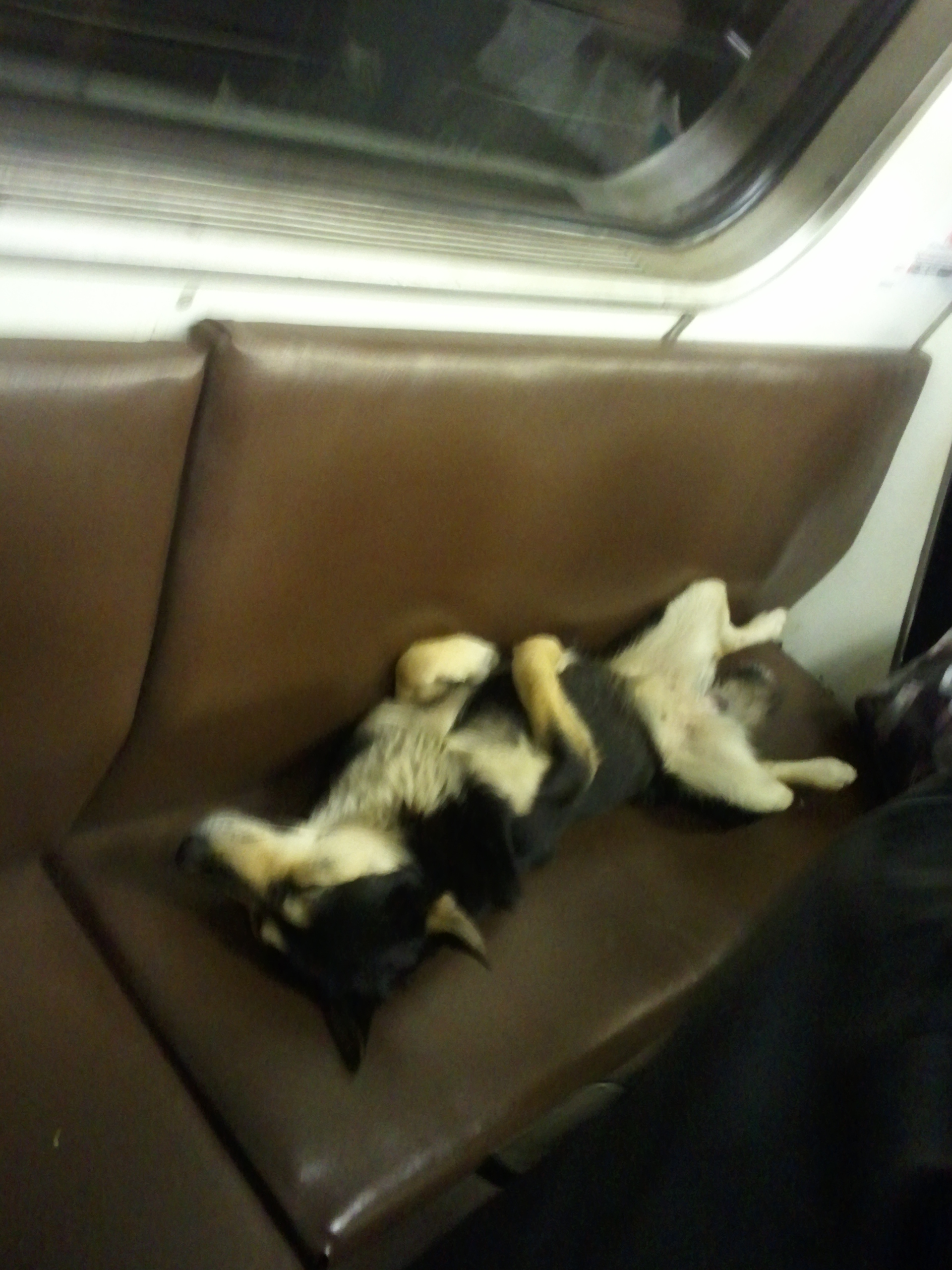
A dog asleep aboard the Moscow Metro

=== Beggars' techniques ===
The urbanized beggars in particular are unfazed by high levels of activity going on around them, even managing to sleep in the midst of busy areas. They also have the most specialized behaviors, which differentiate them from both domesticated dogs and wolves. Beggars may live in packs, but a pack's leader will interact with other packs. The leaders are not necessarily the strongest or most dominant dog, but rather the most intelligent, and are acknowledged as such by the other dogs in the pack who depend on them for survival.

One technique some dogs have for getting food is to sneak up behind a person who is holding some. The dog will then bark, which sometimes startles the human enough to drop the food.

The dogs have learned to cross the street with pedestrians and have been observed obeying traffic lights. Since dogs have dichromatic vision, researchers theorize that the dogs recognize other cues, such as the shapes or positions of the changing signals.

The dogs have become adept at intuiting the psychology of individual humans in order to determine which techniques will work best on whom. Dogs who locate themselves in high traffic areas realize that, in such places, they often won't need to make any effort to procure food, as pedestrians will simply toss it as they pass by. Malnourished-looking dogs are uncommon. Food is often easy to come by, allowing dogs the luxury of being selective.

The reduced need to compete for food has contributed to stable social behavior, although incidents in which humans were harmed by packs of dogs have been known to occur, particularly in less urban areas.

According to Alexei Vereshchagin, a graduate student of Poyarkov's who has studied them, the dogs generally go out of their way to avoid conflict with humans, and rarely defecate in busy areas or onto pavements. Among the general human population, the dogs are simultaneously viewed affectionately and as a problem, but moreover they are generally tolerated. Many people choose to feed them and some people will even build basic shelters for them in the winter. They have come to be considered by many a component of the city's character. Sterilization efforts have had little effect on curtailing the population.

== Subway-dwelling dogs ==
The Moscow Metro is the second most heavily used in the world by daily ridership, behind the Beijing Subway. On average, about 500 dogs live in its stations, especially during colder months. Of these dogs, about 20 are believed to have learned how to use the system as a means of commuting. Theories to explain how they are able to correctly determine their routes include a combination of:

- an ability to judge the length of time spent on the train in between stations (time intervals)
- recognition of the place names announced over their train's loudspeaker
- the scents of particular stations.

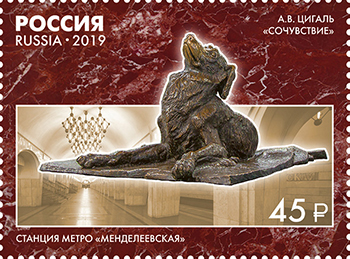
Compassion monument on a 2019 postage stamp of Russia

Author Eugene Linden, a specialist in the subject of animal intelligence, believes the dogs' behavior exhibits "flexible open-ended reasoning and conscious thought". There are also instances when these metro dogs gave birth to pups during their commuting time.

=== Malchik ===
In 2001, a woman mortally stabbed a dog named Malchik, a black feral dog who had made Mendeleyevskaya station his home, guarding it against other dogs and drunks, because he had barked at her dog. The incident, which occurred in front of rush-hour commuters, provoked outrage among celebrities and the general public. The woman was arrested, tried and underwent a year of psychiatric treatment. Funds were raised to erect a bronze statue of Malchik in memoriam, which now sits at the station's entrance.

== Dog attack rates ==
One effect of the large feral population is a high and rising level of dog attacks on humans. In 2023 official statistics suggest that 238,000 individuals sought medical attention for dog bites. At least one attack was fatal in 2021. In part, the problem is traced to status dogs that are abandoned when they become troublesome, and in part due to those dogs living in forested areas that are poorly socialized and more prone to aggressive territorialism.

== See also ==
- Animals taking public transportation
- Bob the Railway Dog, a train riding dog in Australia
- Ivan Mishukov, notable for being a feral child who lived with dogs for about two years
- Soviet space dogs
