= Smithfield (dog) =

- Other names: Smithfield Collie, Smithfield Sheepdog
Traits
- Color: Black, grey or red with a white collar or entirely white

The Smithfield, Smithfield Collie or Smithfield Sheepdog is a breed of herding dog. It is a large, strong dog of the collie type. The Smithfield can be black, grey or red with a white collar, or wholly white and they always possess floppy ears and shaggy hair on the body, face and legs. Two varieties exist, with one having a natural bobtail and the second with a longer tail. It was used for droving cattle in the southeast of England, especially the Smithfield Market in London, and although this breed of dog is believed to be extinct and was never recognised by any of the major kennel clubs before its extinction, dogs of a similar type are shown under the same name in Tasmania, Australia as well as farm herding dogs throughout New Zealand.

== Overview ==
The Smithfield was first introduced to Australia during colonial times. It was a handy dog that was used to work the meat market in Smithfield, London. It is a dog standing from 18 to 21 inches (46 to 53 cm) and has a shaggy appearance. Very little has been documented about this breed, and although it is not a recognised pure breed in the Australian National Kennel Council, it is shown at the Campbell Town Show in Tasmania. Many older farmers still own the breed, as well as some breeders who want to keep the original lines going and maintain effort in the future of the breed.

== Characteristics ==

=== Appearance ===
The Smithfield is different in appearance from the Australian Stumpy Tail Cattle Dog. They are sometimes referred to as 'the British Smithfield'. The coat of the Smithfield grows long, coarse and shaggy in nature. As this dog was originally found in England, and was a street dog, this is consistent with staying warm.

Smithfield dog

=== Personality ===
The Smithfield displays characteristics which can be interpreted as friendly, patient, and good with children. However, they are a working breed and require exercise to satisfy this and ensure a relaxed demeanor at home. Chasing a ball, learning tricks, catching a Frisbee will all satisfy a Smithfield which is not being actively used as a herding dog. At home, and as long as they receive an outing and some exercise each day, they will enjoy being with the family and will be happy to lounge around and alert the family to visitors with a friendly bark.

== See also ==
- Bob the Railway Dog
