= Casper the Commuting Cat =

2010 book by Susan Finden about her cat

- First edition cover
- Author: Susan Finden
- Language: English
- Subject: Cats
- Genres: Non-fiction, biography, children's literature
- Publisher: Simon & Schuster
- Publication date: 5 August 2010
- Publication place: United Kingdom
- Media type: print (hardcover)
- Pages: 240
- ISBN: 0-85720-008-9

Casper the Commuting Cat is an English non-fiction book by Susan Finden about her cat, Casper who attracted worldwide media attention when he became a regular bus commuter in Plymouth in Devon, England. The book was ghost-written by Scottish writer Linda Watson-Brown, and was first published in the United Kingdom by Simon & Schuster UK on 5 August 2010. Subtitled: The True Story of the Cat Who Rode the Bus and Stole Our Hearts, the book was translated into six languages, and was generally well received by reviewers.

== Synopsis ==
Casper the Commuting Cat is the story of an adventurous cat, Casper, that the author, Susan Finden had adopted from a rescue centre in 2002. She describes how Casper liked to wander from her house and was not afraid of people or traffic. Casper used to walk into office blocks and doctors' consulting rooms and find a chair to sleep on. Then he started queuing with people at a bus stop across the road from his house and boarding buses that took his fancy. He would curl up on a seat and go to sleep, and when the bus had completed its 11-mile round-trip to the city centre and returned to his bus stop, the driver would let him off. Casper's commuting habits made him a celebrity and Finden describes the worldwide media attention that she and Casper received. In January 2010 Casper died after being struck by a speeding taxi while crossing the road outside his house. Finden tells how she coped with her loss and the renewed media attention that followed.

In addition to covering Casper's exploits, Finden includes in the book a brief story of her own life, and discusses the other cats she had adopted from rescue centres. Also present are several light-hearted chapters "written" by Casper from "the other side" in which he gives advice to other cats on how to handle humans, catch a bus, and deal with the media.

== Background ==
Susan Finden was born in 1954 and is a mother of three children who lives and works as a part-time health care worker in Plymouth in Devon, England. After the worldwide media coverage of Casper's death, New York-based publishing house Simon & Schuster expressed an interest in buying the rights to Casper's story, and sent representatives from their London office to secure a deal with Finden. Scottish ghostwriter Linda Watson-Brown, also a crime fiction writer and columnist in The Scotsman, assisted Finden with the book. Watson-Brown, an animal lover herself who had previously ghostwritten The Pet Whisperer by Sarah-Jane le Blanc, said that Finden's book "is such a positive and uplifting story, and it's all told in Sue's voice." Casper the Commuting Cat was aimed at both adults and children, and was published with photographs of Casper.

Before the launch of the book, Finden said she intended donating "every penny" she made from the proceeds of the book to animal rescue charities. She also remarked that she found it "very weird seeing my name as an author on Amazon; I was useless at English at school."

== Reception ==
Casper the Commuting Cat was published in August 2010, and by November it had sold 10,500 copies. The book was also translated into six other languages, Dutch, German, Portuguese, Italian, Cantonese and Mandarin. It reached number two in Plymouth's Christmas bestseller list, and it was selected by the Herald Sun in Australia as their "top cat book" for 2010.

The Bookbag website in the UK said the book was "well written and told with honesty and love", and called it "a sweet tale of a unique cat who touched many people's hearts all over the world". Television New Zealand said animal lovers will find the book "a charming and heart-warming tale", although the reviewer did find the chapters "written" by Casper "a little odd and off-putting". The News in New Zealand described the book as "a heart-warming look at the joy animals can bring to a whole community", but also felt that the sections by Casper were weak. The reviewer wrote that while some stories told from an animal's perspective work well, here the idea was "ill-conceived" as Casper never had anything interesting or clever to say.

== Work cited ==
- Finden, Susan (2010). Casper the Commuting Cat. London: Simon & Schuster UK. ISBN 978-0-85720-008-2.
