= Casper (cat) =

Cat from Plymouth that commuted by bus

- Casper commuting by bus
- Other name: Cassie
- Species: Felis silvestris catus
- Sex: Male
- Born: c. 1997
- Died: 14 January 2010 (aged 12–13); Plymouth, Devon, England
- Years active: 2006–2010
- Owner: Susan Finden (2002–2010)

Casper (c. 1997 – 14 January 2010) was a male domestic cat who attracted worldwide media attention in 2009 when it was reported that he was a regular bus commuter in Plymouth in Devon, England. He appeared on BBC News, was the subject of a newspaper editorial in The Guardian, and had a book written about him, Casper the Commuting Cat. Casper died on 14 January 2010 after being hit by a taxi.

== Biography ==
Casper was adopted from an animal rescue centre in Weymouth, Dorset, in 2002 by Susan Finden, a 48-year-old health care worker. He had been at the centre for about ten months and the owners called him Morse, after Inspector Morse, a TV program they had been watching when he arrived. But after a few days with him in her Weymouth house, Finden changed his name to Casper, after Casper the Friendly Ghost, because he kept disappearing. She soon realised that he was a very independent and determined cat, and he frequently wandered off. She also discovered that he was not afraid of people or traffic, and seemed to love being around large vehicles. It was not long before she started hearing reports that he was visiting nearby office blocks, doctor's consulting rooms and pharmacies. Fearing for his safety while crossing roads, Finden tried to keep Casper locked indoors, but he always found a way out.

In 2006, Finden moved to Plymouth, Devon, and when she went to work each day she had no idea what Casper did while she was away. It was not until early 2009 that she discovered that he was riding on buses. The drivers told her that he would politely queue along with other passengers at the bus stop opposite her house, and when a bus came that he liked, he would get on and jump on his favourite seat. Casper would remain on the bus for its 11-mile (18 km) round-trip to the city centre and back to the bus stop opposite his house, where the drivers would let him exit, ensuring that he did not get off at any other stop. When Finden learned of Casper's bus excursions, she contacted the bus company, First Devon & Cornwall, who alerted their drivers to be on the lookout for him. She was touched by how the drivers and passengers went out of their way to accommodate Casper and his unusual behaviour, and wrote a letter to The Plymouth Herald thanking them for their kindness. Her letter led to The Herald publishing an article on Casper in April 2009. British news agencies picked up The Herald article, and Casper's story quickly spread nationally, and then internationally.

Casper became a celebrity and appeared in newspapers and on websites across the world. He featured on BBC News, who had filmed him boarding a bus. First Devon & Cornwall adorned the side of some of their buses with a huge picture of Casper, and said they had no intention of charging Casper a bus fare. Public relations manager Karen Baxter said: "In cat years he's an OAP so he'd get a free bus pass anyway".

== Death ==
On 14 January 2010, Casper was hit by a taxi, whose driver did not stop to help him. He died of his injuries before Finden could get him to a vet. News of the accident spread quickly around the world, with some newspapers calling it a hit and run. Finden later contacted the taxi company, but could not press charges as British traffic regulations do not make it mandatory for drivers to stop after hitting a cat (although they must stop after hitting a dog). She had Casper cremated at a vet's crematorium, but she did not keep his ashes, as she had never kept the ashes of any of her other cats. Plymouth bus drivers and passengers who knew Casper paid tribute to him, and Finden posted a notice at his bus stop:

Many local people knew Casper, who loved everyone. He also enjoyed the bus journeys. Sadly a motorist hit him ... and did not stop. Casper died from his injuries. He will be greatly missed ... he was a much-loved pet who had so much character. Thank you to all those who befriended him.

Finden also received condolences from all over the world, including Australia, Argentina, Indonesia and the United States. The Guardian wrote in an editorial entitled "In praise of... Casper the commuting cat": "Casper had a thing about HGVs, but otherwise little road sense. That could have been his undoing. But, all things considered, what a ride it was."

== Legacy ==
After Casper's death in January 2010, Susan Finden wrote a book called Casper the Commuting Cat with the help of ghostwriter Linda Watson-Brown. It describes Casper's exploits, his rise to fame, and his untimely death. The book was first published in the United Kingdom by Simon & Schuster UK in August 2010, and was later translated into six other languages.

In October 2010 The Plymouth Herald reported that a full-length feature film on Casper's story was being considered, and that a British film director was said to be looking into the story. The Herald said that a production company was believed to be arranging funding, and that two "high-profile actresses" had been identified to play the role of Finden.

== See also ==
- List of individual cats
