= Bobbie the Wonder Dog =

Dog who traveled 2,551 miles to return home

Bobbie
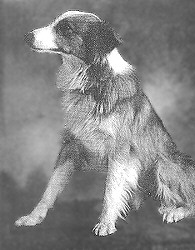
- Species: Dog (Canis lupus familiaris)
- Breed: Scotch Collie-English Shepherd mix
- Sex: Male
- Born: 1921
- Died: 1927 (aged 5-6)
- Resting place: Oregon Humane Society
- Nationality: United States
- Known for: Traveling over 2,500 miles across the United States (Note: Based on odometer reading. Ripley's estimated he may have traveled as much as 2,800 miles (4,500 km). "Silverton Bobbie".)

Bobbie the Wonder Dog (1921–1927) was a dog who is acclaimed for walking 2,551 miles (4,105 km) on his own to return home to Silverton, Oregon, United States, after he was lost while his owners were visiting family in Wolcott, Indiana. Ripley's Believe It or Not! estimated the journey may have been as long as 3,000 miles (4,800 km).

== Life ==
=== Separation ===
In August 1923, Frank and Elizabeth Brazier were visiting relatives in Wolcott, Indiana. They had driven from Oregon on an only recently connected highway system, including the now Historic Columbia River Highway in their new 1923 Willys-Overland Model 92 Red Bird, accompanied by their two year old Scotch Collie-English Shepherd mix dog Bobbie. With the speed limit typically at 15 miles per hour (24 km/h), Bobbie was able to ride on the sideboard and would frequently run along the car as they traveled. They would frequently stay at auto or tourist camps, or park the car at a gas station and stay at a local hotel. These stays would later become important to Bobby's ability to track them.

While stopped in Wolcott, Bobbie was chased by three other dogs from a gas station. He didn't return and couldn't be found. After a few days' search and publishing a newspaper notice asking for help without success, the Brazier family was unable to find Bobbie and continued its trip before returning home to Oregon.

=== Journey home ===
On February 15th 1924 (six months later), Bobbie returned to Silverton. He showed all the signs of having walked the entire distance, including swimming rivers and crossing the Continental Divide during the coldest part of winter. He crossed 2,551 miles (4,105 km) to return home, an average of approximately 14 miles (23 km) per day.

=== Global fame ===
After his return to Silverton, he experienced a rise to fame after the local paper published news of his return. His story drew attention and was featured in numerous newspapers around the world. He was also the subject of Ripley's Believe It or Not!, books, and film.

Bobbie played himself in the 1924 silent film The Call of the West. The film was not based upon the actual events of his journey and wasn't well received.

He received hundreds of letters from people around the world and was honored with a jewel-studded harness and collar, ribbons, and keys to cities.

=== Fosters ===
People who had fed and sheltered Bobbie on his journey wrote the family to tell about their time with Bobbie. The Humane Society of Portland was able to use these stories to assemble a relatively precise description of the route Bobbie took. The Humane Society concluded that after returning to Wolcott, Bobbie initially followed their further travels into Indiana. He then struck out in several directions, apparently seeking their scent. He eventually headed west. The Braziers had parked their car in a service station each night. Their dog visited each of these stops on his journey, along with a number of homes, and a hobo camp. In Portland, an Irish woman took care of him for a period of time, helping him recover from serious injuries to his legs and paws.

=== Death and legacy ===
Upon his death in 1927, he was buried at the Oregon Humane Society's pet cemetery in Portland. German Shepherd film star Rin Tin Tin laid a wreath at his grave. His grave is sheltered by a "fancy white and red dog house" received during an appearance at the Portland Home Show. The gravestone has been moved outside the house for better viewing.

=== Silverton memorialization ===
Bobbie's demonstration of loyalty is celebrated during Silverton's annual children's pet parade that serves as a reminder of the place animals and pets have in people's lives. The event was started in 1932, five years after Bobbie's death as a way to give joy to local children amidst the Great Depression. The first parade was led by his son Pal, one of fifteen surviving puppies sired by Bobbie after his return.

A 70-foot-long (21 m) outdoor mural was completed by Lori L. Rodrigues in 2004 commemorating the 80th anniversary of Bobbie's return home. The mural, located at 206 South Water Street, features several elements of Bobbie's story.It is part of a series of murals honoring local heroes, locations and events painted upon the walls of Silverton businesses.

In 2012, responding to public sentiment that his burial location in Portland did not properly honor his story and his connection to his hometown, a grassroots movement was started by a group of Silvertonians with the goal of repatriating Bobbie's remains to Silverton, for reburial and memorialization. However the descendants of Elizabeth Brazier asked the group to allow Bobbie’s remains to stay at the Oregon Humane Society. The initiative was then transformed to keep his legacy alive.

== See also ==
- List of individual dogs
- A Dog's Way Home – a movie with similar themes to Bobbie's story
