= English Shepherd =

American herding dog

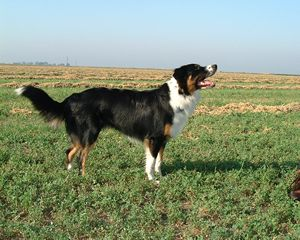
- Tricolor English Shepherd
- Other names: Farm Collie, Farm Shepherd, Old Farm Collie, American Farm Shepherd
- Origin: United States
Traits
Height	Males	19–23 in (48–58 cm)
	Females	18–22 in (46–56 cm)
Weight	Males	45–65 lb (20–29 kg)
	Females	40–50 lb (18–23 kg)
- Coat: Long
- Color: Black & white, black & tan, sable & white, tan & white or tricolor (black, white & tan)
Kennel club standards
- United Kennel Club: standard

The English Shepherd is a breed of herding dog from the United States.

== Description ==
The English Shepherd is a medium-sized breed of dog, it weighs between 40 and 65 pounds (18 and 29 kg) and stands between 18 and 23 inches (46 and 58 cm), males are typically larger than females. The breed has a long, straight or wavy double coat with feathering on the legs and tail, traditionally it has four different color combinations, black and white, black and tan, sable and white or tricolor (black, white and tan), although shades of fawn and red tan to white are also seen in the breed. According to the breed standard, the coat may be straight, wavy or curly, except on the face, skull and front of legs where it is short and smooth.

== History ==
The progenitors of the English Shepherd were collies of various types brought to the New World by early settlers from Britain and Ireland, as such it shares ancestry with the modern Border Collie, Rough Collie and Australian Shepherd. The ancestors of the English Shepherd were used extensively on farms throughout the eastern states, principally as a sheep and cattle herder, although it also performed the roles of watchdog, ratter and companion.

The United Kennel Club (UKC) has been registering English Shepherds since 1927, originally the UKC called the breed the American Farm Shepherd but in 2003 renamed it the English Shepherd. The breed is not recognized by the American Kennel Club.

== See also ==
- List of dog breeds
