= Action of 26 April 1944 =

Naval battle during the Second World War

- Part of Second World War, Battle of the Atlantic
Date	25–26 April 1944
Location	English Channel, off Jentilez
Result	Allied victory

Belligerents
United Kingdom; Canada	(Nazi Germany) Germany

Strength
1 Dido-class cruiser 4 Tribal-class destroyers	3 Elbing-class torpedo boats

Casualties and losses
2 destroyers damaged 2 destroyers lightly damaged	1 Elbing-class torpedo boat (T29) sunk 2 torpedo boats damaged

The action of 26 April 1944 occurred as a part of Operation Tunnel, Allied destroyer sweeps of the coast of Brittany in preparation for Operation Overlord. On the night of 25–26 April, a sweep was conducted by the Dido-class cruiser HMS Black Prince and the Tribal-class destroyers HMS Ashanti, HMCS Athabaskan, HMCS Haida and HMCS Huron. They engaged the Elbing-class torpedo boats T24, T27 and T29 off the île de Batz until T29 was destroyed. Both of the other torpedo boats were damaged in the engagement. T29 caused some casualties on Haida and Huron before sinking with a loss of 135 men. Huron and Ashanti collided with each other near the end of the action.
