= John Hamilton Stubbs =

Canadian navy officer (1912–1944)

Lieutenant-Commander John Hamilton Stubbs, DSO DSC (June 5, 1912 – 1944) was a Royal Canadian Navy officer. He was killed in the sinking of the destroyer HMCS Athabaskan in 1944.

== Biography ==
Born in Kaslo, British Columbia, Stubbs was the son of an electrical engineer. From an early age, he expressed an interest in becoming a sailor, and joined the Navy League Sea Cadets aged 10. After attending the Brentwood College School, he applied to join the Royal Canadian Navy, and joined the service as a cadet in 1930.

After initial training, Stubbs was sent to the Royal Navy for further training. He was posted to the Mediterranean Fleet, and served in ships including in the battleship HMS Revenge. In 1935, he was appointed navigation officer in the Canadian destroyer HMCS Skeena, and was promoted to lieutenant the following year. He was then sent to the United Kingdom to receive the Long Navigation Course in HMS Dryad. After finishing the course, he was posted to the destroyer HMCS Ottawa as navigation officer. In 1940, Stubbs was posted to the destroyer HMCS Assiniboine as executive officer under Commodore Leonard W. Murray, taking over as commanding officer from Murray in September that year.

For the next two years, Stubbs was mainly engaged in convoy escort duties in Assiniboine, though in August 1941 he escorted the battleship HMS Prince of Wales to Placentia Bay where British prime minister Winston Churchill met US President Franklin Roosevelt for the first time.

Whilst escorting Convoy SC 94 in early August 1942 as part of Escort Group C1, Assiniboine's Type 286 radar spotted the German submarine U-210 in a heavy fog on 6 August. After attacking the submarine with machine gun fire, Stubbs rammed it twice and finally sank it with depth charges. For his actions, Stubbs was appointed a Companion of the Distinguished Service Order.

In 1944, whilst in command of the destroyer HMCS Athabaskan, Stubbs took part in the Action of 26 April 1944, which resulted in the destruction of the German torpedo boat T29. For this action, Stubbs was awarded the Distinguished Service Cross.

Three days later, Athabaskan was torpedoed and sank, with heavy loss of life. Stubbs was one of those killed. He reportedly refused rescue and shouted to HMCS Haida, which was searching for survivors, to get to safety. Stubbs is buried in Plouescat Communal Cemetery, France.

Mount Stubbs in British Columbia and École John Stubbs Memorial School in Colwood, British Columbia are named in his honour.
