= HMCS Athabaskan (G07) =

Tribal-class destroyer, launched 1941

Coordinates: 48°43′N 4°32′W

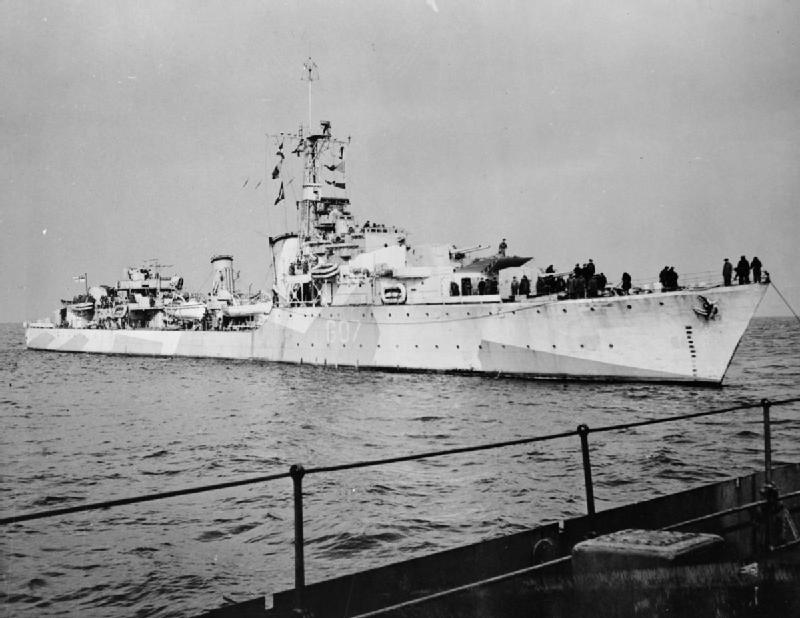
- HMCS Athabaskan, date unknown.

History

Canada
- Name: Athabaskan
- Namesake: The First Nations peoples who share the Athabaskan language
- Ordered: 5 April 1940
- Builder: Vickers-Armstrongs, High Walker
- Laid down: 31 October 1940
- Launched: 15 November 1941
- Commissioned: 3 February 1943
- Out of service: 29 April 1944
- Identification: Pennant number: G07
- Motto: "We fight as one"
- Honours and awards: Arctic 1943-44, English Channel 1944
- Fate: Sunk by German torpedo boats in the English Channel, 29 April 1944 (north of Île Vierge and off the coast of Brittany)
- Badge: On a field argent, a North American Indian mounted bareback upon an Indian pony, holding a red bow and arrow in the "ready" position

General characteristics
- Class & type: Tribal-class destroyer
- Displacement: 1,850 long tons (1,880 t) (standard); 2,520 long tons (2,560 t) (full)
- Length: 377 ft (115 m) length overall
- Beam: 37 ft 6 in (11.43 m)
- Draught: 9 ft (2.7 m)
- Installed power: 44,000 shp (33,000 kW)
- Propulsion: 2 × Parsons steam turbines; 3 × Admiralty 3-drum boilers; 2 × shafts
- Speed: 36 kn (67 km/h; 41 mph)
- Range: 5,700 nmi (10,600 km; 6,600 mi) at 15 kn (17 mph; 28 km/h)
- Capacity: 524 short tons (475 t) fuel oil
- Complement: 190 (219 as leader)
- Armament: 3 × twin 4.7 in (120 mm) guns; 1 × twin 4 in (102 mm) DP guns; 1 × quadruple 2-pdr (40 mm (1.6 in)) AA guns; 4 x twin and 2 × single 20 mm (1 in) AA guns; 1 × quadruple 21 in (533 mm) torpedo tubes; 1 × Depth charge rack, 2 × throwers, 30 depth charges

HMCS Athabaskan was the first of three destroyers of the Royal Canadian Navy to bear this name. It was a destroyer of the Tribal class which served in the Second World War. She was named for the First Nations peoples who make up the Athabaskan language group. She was torpedoed in the English Channel and sunk in 1944.

Athabaskan was ordered 5 April 1940 as part of the 1940–1941 building programme. She was laid down in the United Kingdom on 31 October 1940 by Vickers-Armstrongs of High Walker and built in consort with CA Parsons engine works. She was launched on 18 November 1941 and commissioned into the Royal Canadian Navy on 3 February 1943.

== Service history ==
HMCS Athabaskan had a relatively short service of about 14 months between her commissioning and sinking. The ship also experienced several major mishaps and battle damage that required her being taken out of service for repairs for a total of about five months. When these repair periods are taken into account, Athabaskan was available for actual service at sea for a total of only nine months prior to her sinking.

After a short work-up subsequent to commissioning on 3 February 1943, Athabaskan sailed on 29 March 1943 to patrol the Iceland–Faeroes Passage for blockade runners, but heavy seas damaged her hull, which took five weeks to repair at South Shields. Shortly after returning to service, in early June 1943 she took part in Operation Gearbox III, the relief of the garrison at Spitsbergen.

On 18 June 1943, Athabaskan sustained damage during a collision with the boom defence vessel Bargate at Scapa Flow, resulting in a month under repair at Devonport. In July and August 1943, she was based in Plymouth, carrying out anti-submarine patrols in the Bay of Biscay.

Athabaskan was heavily damaged by a Henschel Hs 293 glider bomb, dropped by a KG 100 aircraft, during an anti-submarine chase off Cape Ortegal, in the Bay of Biscay, on 27 August 1943. HMS Egret was sunk in the same incident. The glider bomb passed entirely through Athabaskan before detonating on the outside of the ship.

Returning to Scapa Flow in December 1943 she escorted convoy JW55A to the Soviet Union but in February 1944, rejoined Plymouth command and was assigned to the newly formed 10th Destroyer Flotilla carrying out Operation Hostile (minelaying) and Operation Tunnel (patrol) missions off the coast of France. On 26 April, she assisted in the destruction of the German Elbing-class torpedo boat T29 in the English Channel off Ushant as part of an Operation Tunnel mission that included the British cruiser Black Prince, destroyer Ashanti and Canadian Tribals Haida, Huron and Athabaskan. Three days later Athabaskan was sunk in another action.

== Final action, sinking ==
On 29 April 1944 at about 0300 hours Athabaskan was patrolling with her sister Tribal-class destroyer Haida in support of a British minelaying operation off the coast of France near the mouth of the Morlaix River. She received the first of a series of Admiralty orders to intercept German warships near Ile de Bas (sometimes Île de Batz) as spotted by coastal radar in southern England. During the subsequent engagement with German naval vessels, Athabaskan was torpedoed and sank. 128 men were lost, 44 were rescued by Haida and 83 were taken prisoner by three German minesweepers sortied from the coast after the departure of Haida.

As might be expected with a night-time naval battle, various sources and even eyewitnesses provide widely differing accounts of the events surrounding the sinking of Athabaskan. Some survivors recount that the ship was initially struck by shore-battery gunfire, and then by a torpedo. It is established, that at 0417 hours Athabaskan was first torpedoed in a port stern by the German torpedo boat T24. (Note: Bukała) At least one survivor tells of a second torpedo hit fifteen minutes after the first, but the official history of the Royal Canadian Navy attributes the second major explosion to the fires touching off the ammunition magazine. According to an analysis of one author, however, the second explosion was probably friendly fire, torpedoed again by the MTB 677 torpedo boat, which was one of two torpedo boats covering the Hostile 26 minelaying operation. (Note: Bukała)

Athabaskan's commanding officer, Lieutenant Commander John Stubbs, was killed in action after declining rescue by Haida to swim back for more crew members. In 2004, the Royal Canadian Navy provided a brass plaque to be laid on the wreck to commemorate the loss. The expedition found more information about the sinking but did not clarify the actual cause. The wreck is in a shattered condition spread over the sea bed.

== HMCS Haida motor cutter rescue ==
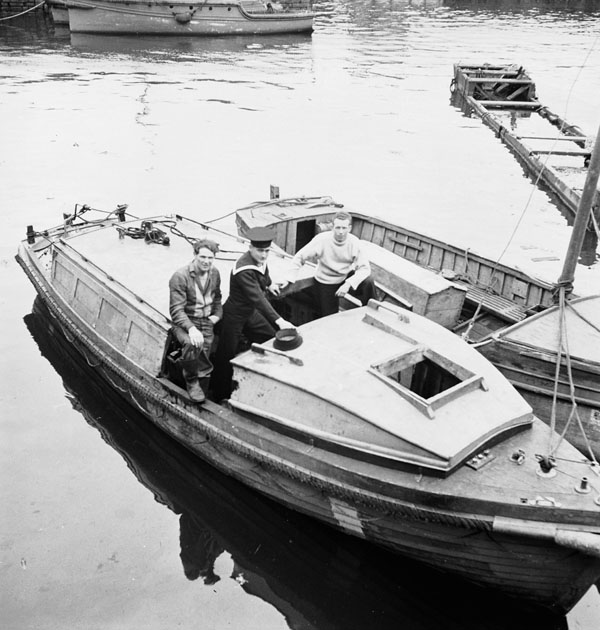
The motor cutter of HMCS Haida, which was used to rescue survivors of the sinking of Athabaskan

When Haida quickly departed the area due to the onset of daylight and heightened risk from air and sea attacks, she left behind her motor cutter manned by Leading Seaman W. A. MacLure, Jack Hannam and three volunteers. MacLure and his comrades rescued six Athabaskan survivors along with two Haida crew who had been washed from the scramble nets as the ship departed. As recounted in Canada's official naval history, the German minesweepers chased the motor cutter but gave up for unknown reasons. After a series of breakdowns and encounters with enemy aircraft, MacLure's motor cutter eventually made landfall in England under Royal Air Force escort just before midnight on 29 April 1944.

== Legacy ==
Athabaskan Island, near Bella Bella on the Central Coast of British Columbia, was named in memory of Athabaskan.

École John Stubbs Memorial School near Victoria, British Columbia is named for Lieutenant Commander John Stubbs.

A memorial to the loss of the Athabaskan can be found at Port de Porsguen (near Roscoff).
