= Battle of Ushant (1944) =

Naval battle of the invasion of Normandy in WWII

- Part of the Invasion of Normandy
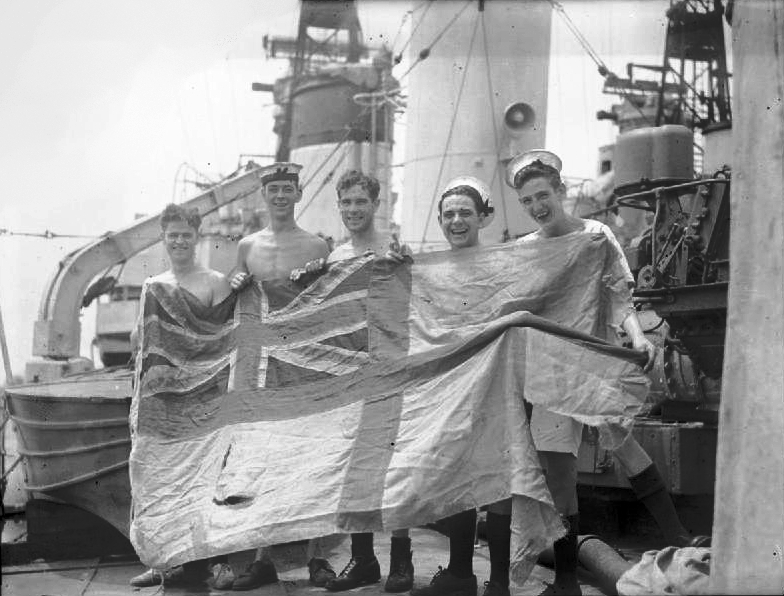
- Crew members of HMS Tartar display their torn White Ensign
Date	9 June 1944
Location	English Channel
Result	Allied victory

Belligerents
United Kingdom; Canada; Poland	Germany

Commanders and leaders
Basil Jones	Theodor von Bechtolsheim

Strength
8 destroyers	3 destroyers; 1 torpedo boat

Casualties and losses
1 destroyer damaged	39 killed; 140 captured; 1 destroyer sunk; 1 destroyer scuttled

The Battle of Ushant, also known as the Battle of Brittany, occurred on the early morning of 9 June 1944 and was an engagement between German and Allied destroyer flotillas off the coast of Brittany. The action came shortly after the initial Allied landings in Normandy. After a confused engagement during the night the Allies sank one of the German destroyers and forced another ashore, where she was wrecked.

== Background ==
On 6 June 1944, the day of the first landings in Normandy, the remnants of the German 8th destroyer flotilla, consisting of the Type 36A Z24 and Z32, and the ZH1 (formerly the Dutch destroyer Gerard Callenburgh) were ordered by Vizeadmiral Theodor Krancke to sail from the Gironde estuary to Brest. The order was intercepted by the British which detailed Canadian Beaufighter aircraft from RAF Coastal Command to attack the German ships as they sailed through the Bay of Biscay. In the ensuing raid, the destroyer Z32 was slightly damaged. The German ships made port at Brest, where Z24 and Z32 had their anti-aircraft armament increased. They then put to sea again on 8 June in company with the Elbing-class torpedo boat T24 (Theodor von Bechtolsheim) the sole survivor of the 4th torpedo boat flotilla, bound for Cherbourg, where they would reinforce German positions.

The Allied forces learned of the German intentions through Ultra intercepts, and detailed the 10th Destroyer Flotilla to intercept the German ships as they sailed up the English Channel. The 10th Destroyer Flotilla was at this time under the overall command of Captain Basil Jones, who had his flag aboard the Tribal-class destroyer HMS Tartar. With them were HMS Ashanti, Eskimo and Javelin, the Canadian ships HMCS Haida and Huron, and the Polish vessels ORP Piorun and Błyskawica. Jones decided to split his flotilla in two; the 19th Division consisted of Eskimo, Javelin, Piorun and Błyskawica, the 20th Division consisted of Tartar, Ashanti, Huron and Haida.

== Engagement ==
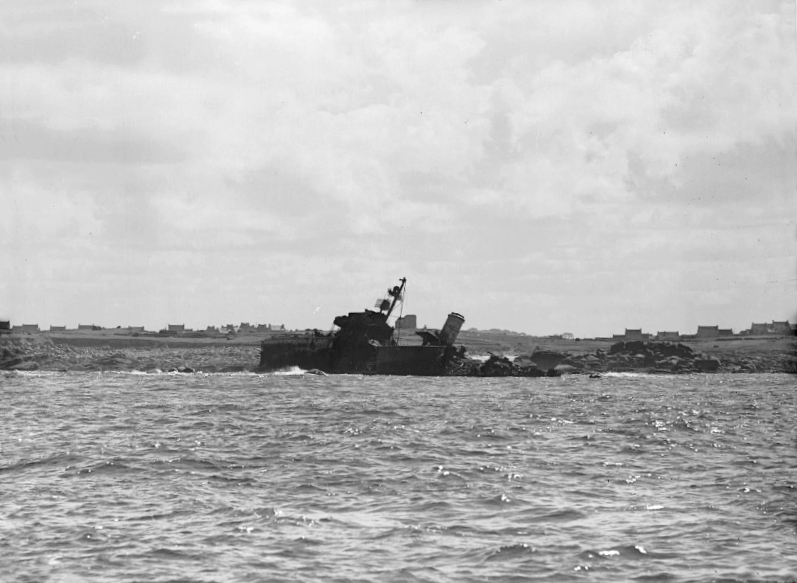
Z32 wrecked on the Île-de-Batz

The British flotilla were moving westward down the Channel when the German ships were detected by radar just after 01:00 on 9 June. Jones turned his force to meet the Germans, who were by now 30 nmi (56 km; 35 mi) east-north-east of the Ile de Batz. The two flotillas clashed intermittently thereafter, exchanging gunfire and salvos of torpedoes. Tartar was struck several times, but was able to put out fires and restore her speed. ZH1 was then engaged by both Tartar and Ashanti, with Ashanti launching two torpedoes at point-blank range. One struck ZH1, blowing off her bows. With the ship crippled, her captain, Klaus Barckow gave the order to abandon ship, then scuttled her with depth charges at 02:40. Barckow was among the 39 killed. Twenty-eight managed to reach France, the remaining 140 were picked up by the British.

Haida and Huron had been pursuing Z24 and T24 until the German ships ran into a British minefield. The Canadians tried to detour around it but eventually lost touch with the Germans. Z24 and T24 regrouped, with the intention of returning to engage the British, but finding they were not being followed, they left the area. Haida and Huron returned to the scene and came across Bechtolsheim's Z32, which had received a heavy pounding and lost contact with the rest of the Germans. There was some confusion over establishing each other's identity, but when the Canadians discovered she was a German ship they opened fire. Bechtolsheim fled at high speed, but Z32, having sustained heavy damage, was driven ashore on the Ile de Batz, and then finished off by a squadron of Beaufighter aircraft the next day. Z32 lost 19 men killed during the battle.

== Surviving ships ==
Two destroyers from the battle survive as museum ships, Haida in Hamilton, Ontario, Canada and Błyskawica in Gdynia, Poland.
