= German torpedo boat T29 =

German World War II torpedo boat

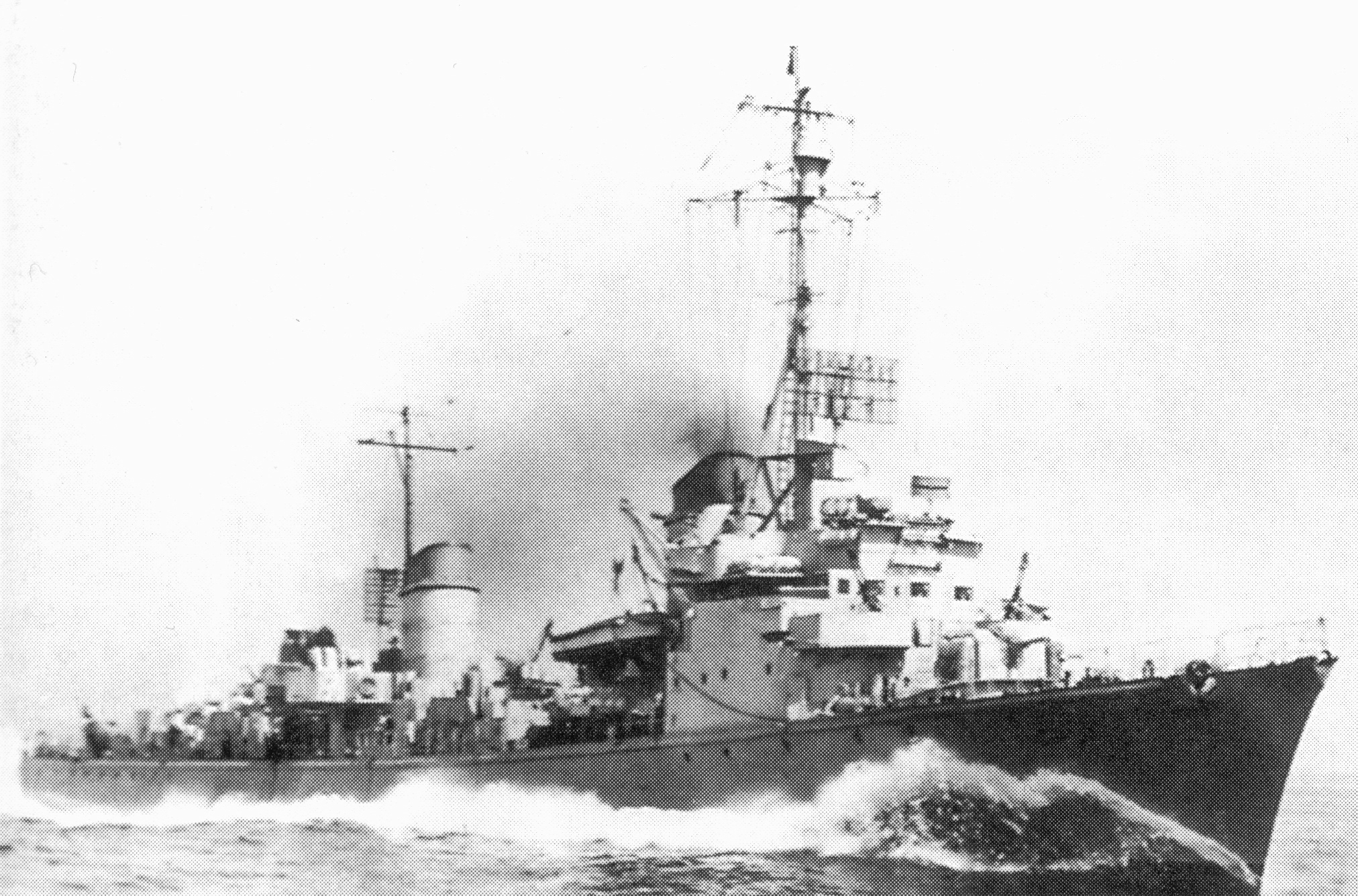
- Sister ship T35 in US service, August 1945

History

Nazi Germany
- Name: T29
- Ordered: 10 November 1939
- Builder: Schichau, Elbing, East Prussia
- Yard number: 1488
- Completed: 21 August 1943
- Fate: Sunk by gunfire, 26 April 1944

General characteristics (as built)
- Class & type: Type 39 torpedo boat
- Displacement: 1,294 t (1,274 long tons) (standard); 1,754 t (1,726 long tons) (deep load)
- Length: 102.5 m (336 ft 3 in) o/a
- Beam: 10 m (32 ft 10 in)
- Draft: 3.22 m (10 ft 7 in)
- Installed power: 4 × water-tube boilers; 32,000 shp (24,000 kW)
- Propulsion: 2 × shafts; 2 × geared steam turbine sets
- Speed: 33.5 knots (62.0 km/h; 38.6 mph)
- Range: 2,400 nmi (4,400 km; 2,800 mi) at 19 knots (35 km/h; 22 mph)
- Complement: 206
- Sensors & processing systems: S-Gerät sonar; FuMO 21 radar
- Armament: 4 × single 10.5 cm (4.1 in) guns; 2 × twin 3.7 cm (1.5 in) AA guns; 1 × quadruple, 2 × single 2 cm (0.8 in) AA guns; 2 × triple 533 mm (21 in) torpedo tubes; 30–60 mines; 4 × depth charge launchers

The German torpedo boat T29 was one of fifteen Type 39 torpedo boats built for the Kriegsmarine (German Navy) during World War II. Completed in mid-1943, the boat was transferred to France in January 1944. She fought in the Action of 26 April off the coast of Brittany, and was sunk by four Allied destroyers with the loss of 137 crewmen.

== Design and description ==
The Type 39 torpedo boat was conceived as a general-purpose design, much larger than preceding German torpedo boats. The boats had an overall length of 102.5 meters (336 ft 3 in) and were 97 meters (318 ft 3 in) long at the waterline. They had a beam of 10 meters (32 ft 10 in), a draft of 3.22 meters (10 ft 7 in) at deep load and displaced 1,294 metric tons (1,274 long tons) at standard load and 1,754 metric tons (1,726 long tons) at deep load. Their crew numbered 206 officers and sailors. The Type 39s were fitted with a pair of geared steam turbine sets, each driving one propeller, using steam from four high-pressure water-tube boilers. The turbines were designed to produce 32,000 shaft horsepower (24,000 kW) which was intended give the ships a maximum speed of 33.5 knots (62.0 km/h; 38.6 mph). They carried enough fuel oil to give them a range of 2,400 nautical miles (4,400 km; 2,800 mi) at 19 knots (35 km/h; 22 mph).

As built, the Type 39 ships mounted four 10.5 cm (4.1 in) SK C/32 guns in single mounts protected by gun shields; one forward of the superstructure, one between the funnels, and two aft, one superfiring over the other. Anti-aircraft defense was provided by four 3.7 cm (1.5 in) SK C/30 AA guns in two twin-gun mounts on platforms abaft the rear funnel, six 2 cm (0.8 in) C/38 guns in one quadruple mount on the aft superstructure and a pair of single mounts on the bridge wings. They carried six above-water 533 mm (21 in) torpedo tubes in two triple mounts amidships and could also carry 30 mines; the full complement of 60 mines made the ships top-heavy which could be dangerous in bad weather. For anti-submarine work the boats were fitted with a S-Gerät sonar and four depth charge launchers. The Type 39s were equipped with a FuMO 21 (Note: Funkmess-Ortung (Radio-direction finder, active ranging)) radar and various FumB (Note: Funkmess-Beobachtung (Passive radar detector).) radar detectors were installed late in the war.

== Construction and career ==
Originally ordered as a Type 37 torpedo boat on 30 March 1939, T29 was reordered on 10 November 1939 from Schichau. She was laid down at their Elbing, East Prussia, shipyard as yard number 1488, and commissioned on 21 August 1943. After working up, T29 and her sister T28 arrived in Western France during late January 1944. En route the two torpedo boats were shelled by British coastal artillery and attacked by a pair of British Fairey Albacore torpedo bombers that caused some minor damage to T28.

=== Action of 26 April 1944 ===
On the night of 21/22 April 1944, the 4th Torpedo Boat Flotilla, now consisting of T29 and her sisters T24 and T27, transferred from Cherbourg to Saint-Malo. After laying a minefield off the Sept-Îles on the north coast of Brittany on the night of 25/26 April, the flotilla was engaged by an Allied force that consisted of the light cruiser HMS Black Prince and the destroyers HMS Ashanti, HMCS Athabaskan, HMCS Haida and HMCS Huron off the Île de Batz. The Allied ships were engaged by German coastal artillery without effect and Korvettenkapitän Franz Kohlauf headed west in search of the Allied ships, but the Germans were spotted first by Black Prince's radar at a range of 21,000 yards (19,000 m) at 02:07. They detected the Allied ships shortly afterwards and reversed course. The Allied ships were faster than the torpedo boats and had closed the range to 13,000 yards (12,000 m) by 02:20 when Black Prince began firing star shells. The destroyers began firing at T24 and T27 at a range of 9,000 yards (8,200 m) as Black Prince hung back in support until one of her forward turrets jammed. The Allied fire was accurate and one shell struck T27 at 02:31 and reduced her speed to 12 knots (22 km/h; 14 mph); Kohlauf ordered her into Morlaix Bay and the Allies lost her radar reflection among the rocks of the bay. T24 had fruitlessly fired her aft torpedo tubes at her pursuers and was then hit by two shells in her superstructure that started fires that were quickly doused. She fired her remaining torpedoes to no effect at 02:54 and, about that same time, a shell disabled T29's rudder. Ashanti and Huron concentrated on T29, initially hitting her stern which caused her to veer off-course, while Haida and Athabaskan continued their pursuit of T24.

Ashanti and Huron hit their target repeatedly at close range; these hits set T29 on fire, caused an explosion and blew the forward torpedo mount overboard. Haida and Athabaskan were unable to catch T24 and returned to help sink T29, but were initially unable to do so despite firing 15 torpedoes. The destroyers paused to allow the surviving crew to abandon ship around 04:00. When they moved in to recover survivors, a single 2 cm gun opened fire and damaged Huron and Haida. The Allied ships returned fire and sank T29 at 04:20 at 48°53′N 03°33′W with the loss of 137 crewmen. A patrol boat later rescued 73 men.
