= HMCS Haida =

1943 Tribal-class destroyer

Coordinates: 43.27531°N 79.85538°W

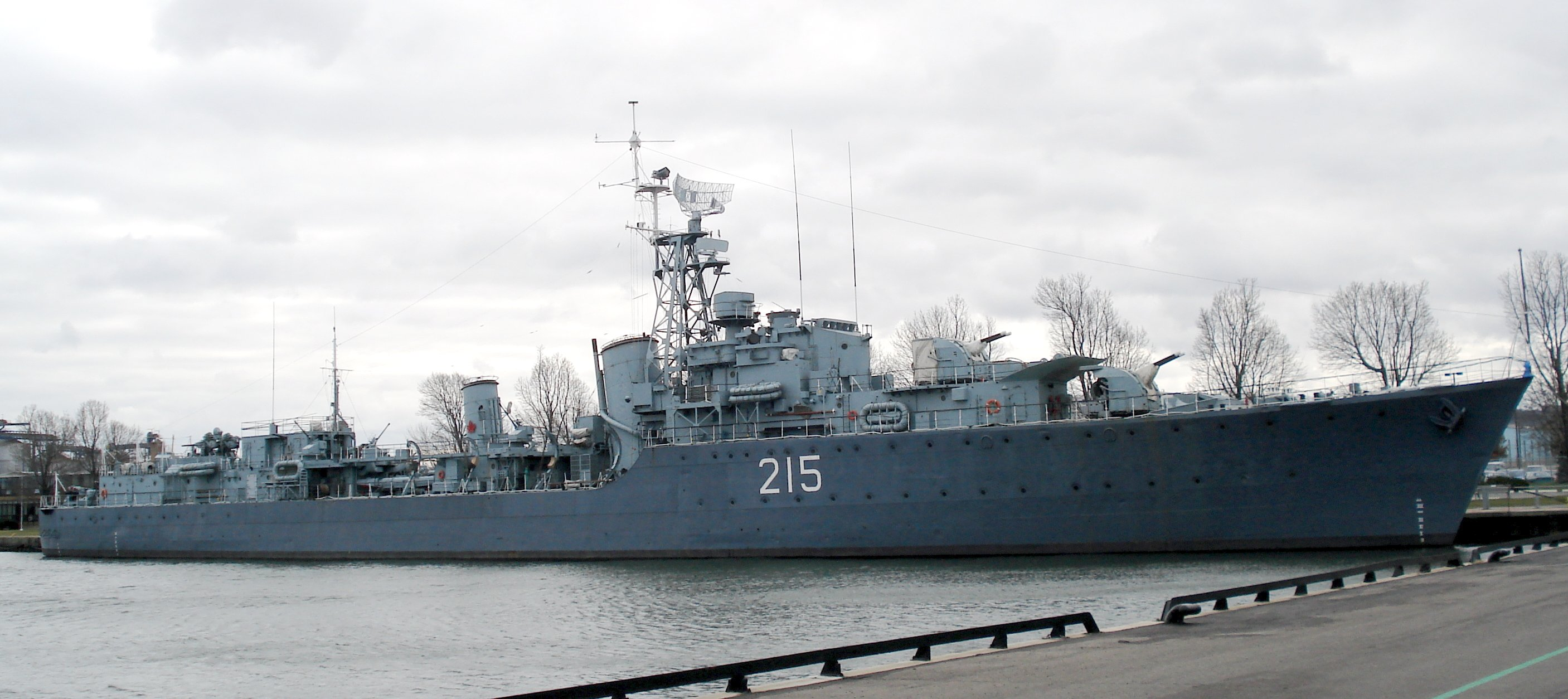
- HMCS Haida docked in Hamilton, Ontario, as a museum ship

History

Canada
- Name: Haida
- Namesake: Haida
- Ordered: 5 April 1940
- Builder: Vickers-Armstrongs, Ltd., Newcastle-upon-Tyne
- Yard number: 41
- Laid down: 29 September 1941
- Launched: 25 August 1942
- Commissioned: 30 August 1943
- Decommissioned: 20 March 1946
- Recommissioned: 15 March 1952
- Decommissioned: 11 October 1963
- Out of service: 22 February 1964
- Identification: G63 (August 1943); DDE 215 (February 1952)
- Honours and awards: Arctic 1943–1945; English Channel 1944; Normandy 1944; Biscay 1944; Korea 1952–1953
- Status: Museum ship

General characteristics
- Class & type: Tribal-class destroyer
- Displacement: 1,959 long tons (1,990 t) standard; 2,519 long tons (2,559 t) deep load
- Length: 377 ft (114.9 m)
- Beam: 37 ft 6 in (11.4 m)
- Draught: 13 ft (4.0 m)
- Propulsion: 2 shafts; 3 × Admiralty 3-drum type boilers; 2 × Parsons geared steam turbines, 44,000 shp (33,000 kW)
- Speed: 36.5 knots (67.6 km/h; 42.0 mph) (maximum), 32 knots (59 km/h; 37 mph) (service)
- Complement: 259 (14 officers, 245 ratings)
- Sensors & processing systems: As G63 (1943–1952): 1 type 268 radar; 1 type 271 radar; 1 type 291 radar; 1 × Mk.III fire control director with Type 285 fire control radar; 1 type 144 sonar; 1 type 144Q sonar; 1 type 147F sonar; As DDE 215 (1952–1963): 1 SPS-6C air search radar; 1 Sperry Mk.2 navigation radar; 1 × Mk.63 fire control director with SPG-34 fire control radar; 1 type 164B sonar; 1 type 162 (SQS 501) sonar; SQS 10 sonar
- Armament: As G63 (1943–1952): 3 × 4.7-inch (119 mm)/45 Mk.XII twin guns; 1 × 4-inch (102 mm)/45 Mk.16 twin guns; 1 × quadruple mount 40 mm/39 2-pounder gun; 6 × 20 mm Oerlikon twin cannons; 1 quad launcher with Mk.IX torpedoes (4 × 21-inch (533 mm) torpedo tubes); 1 rail + 2 Mk.IV throwers (Mk.VII depth charges); As DDE 215 (1952–1963): 2 × 4-inch/45 Mk.16 twin guns; 1 × 3-inch (76 mm)/50 Mk.33 twin guns; 4 × 40 mm/56 Bofors guns; 1 quad launcher with Mk.IX torpedoes (4 × 21 inch (533 mm) torpedo tubes); 2 × Squid ASW mortars

National Historic Site of Canada
- Official name: HMCS Haida National Historic Site of Canada
- Designated: 1984

HMCS Haida is a Tribal-class destroyer that served in the Royal Canadian Navy (RCN) from 1943 to 1963, participating in World War II and the Korean War. She was named after the Haida people.

The only surviving Tribal-class destroyer out of 27 vessels constructed for the RCN, the Royal Navy, and the Royal Australian Navy between 1937 and 1945, Haida sank more enemy surface tonnage than any other Canadian warship and as such is commonly referred to as the "Fightingest Ship in the Royal Canadian Navy".

Designated a national historic site of Canada in 1984, she now serves as a museum ship, berthed next to HMCS Star, an active Royal Canadian Naval Reserve Division, in Hamilton, Ontario. In 2018, Haida was designated the ceremonial flagship of the RCN.

== Design and description ==
The Tribals were fully designed to fight heavily armed enemy destroyers, such as the Japanese Fubuki class. Canada chose the design based on its armament, with the size and power of the Tribal class allowing them to act more like small cruisers than as fleet destroyers. Haida was among the first batch of Tribal-class destroyers ordered by the RCN in 1940–1941. They were ordered with modified ventilation and heating systems for North Atlantic winter service. Haida's design was modified after deficiencies were noted in the lead ship of the Canadian Tribals, HMCS Iroquois.

Haida, one of the British-built Tribal-class destroyers, was 335 feet 6 inches (102.26 m) long between perpendiculars and 377 feet (115 m) long overall with a beam of 36 feet 6 inches (11.13 m) and a draught of 13 feet (4.0 m). The destroyer displaced 1,927 long tons (1,958 t) standard and 2,745 long tons (2,789 t) at deep load. Haida had a complement of 14 officers and 245 ratings.

The destroyer was propelled by two shafts driven by two Parsons geared turbines powered by steam created by three Admiralty-type three-drum boilers. This created 44,000 shaft horsepower (33,000 kW) and gave the ship a maximum speed of 36.5 knots (67.6 km/h; 42.0 mph). The destroyers could carry 505–516 long tons (513–524 t) of fuel oil.

Haida was fitted with six quick-firing 4.7-inch (119 mm) Mk XII guns placed in three twin turrets, designated 'A', 'B' and 'Y' from bow to stern. (Note: Mark XII = Mark 12. Britain used Roman numerals to denote Marks (models) of ordnance until after World War II.) The turrets were placed on 40° mountings with open-backed shields. The ship also had one twin turret of QF 4-inch (102 mm) Mk XVI guns in the 'X' position. For secondary anti-aircraft armament, the destroyer was equipped with four single-mounted 2-pounder "pom-pom" guns. The vessel was also fitted with four 21-inch (533 mm) torpedo tubes for Mk IX torpedoes.

== Construction and career ==
Haida's keel was laid down by Vickers-Armstrongs, Ltd. at their shipyard in Newcastle-upon-Tyne on 29 September 1941 with the yard number 41.

The destroyer was launched on 25 August 1942 and commissioned into RCN service on 30 August 1943. Haida was inspected by High Commissioner for Canada in the United Kingdom Vincent Massey shortly after her commissioning in 1943. She underwent workups under her first commanding officer, H. G. DeWolf before reporting to the British Home Fleet at Scapa Flow in October 1943.

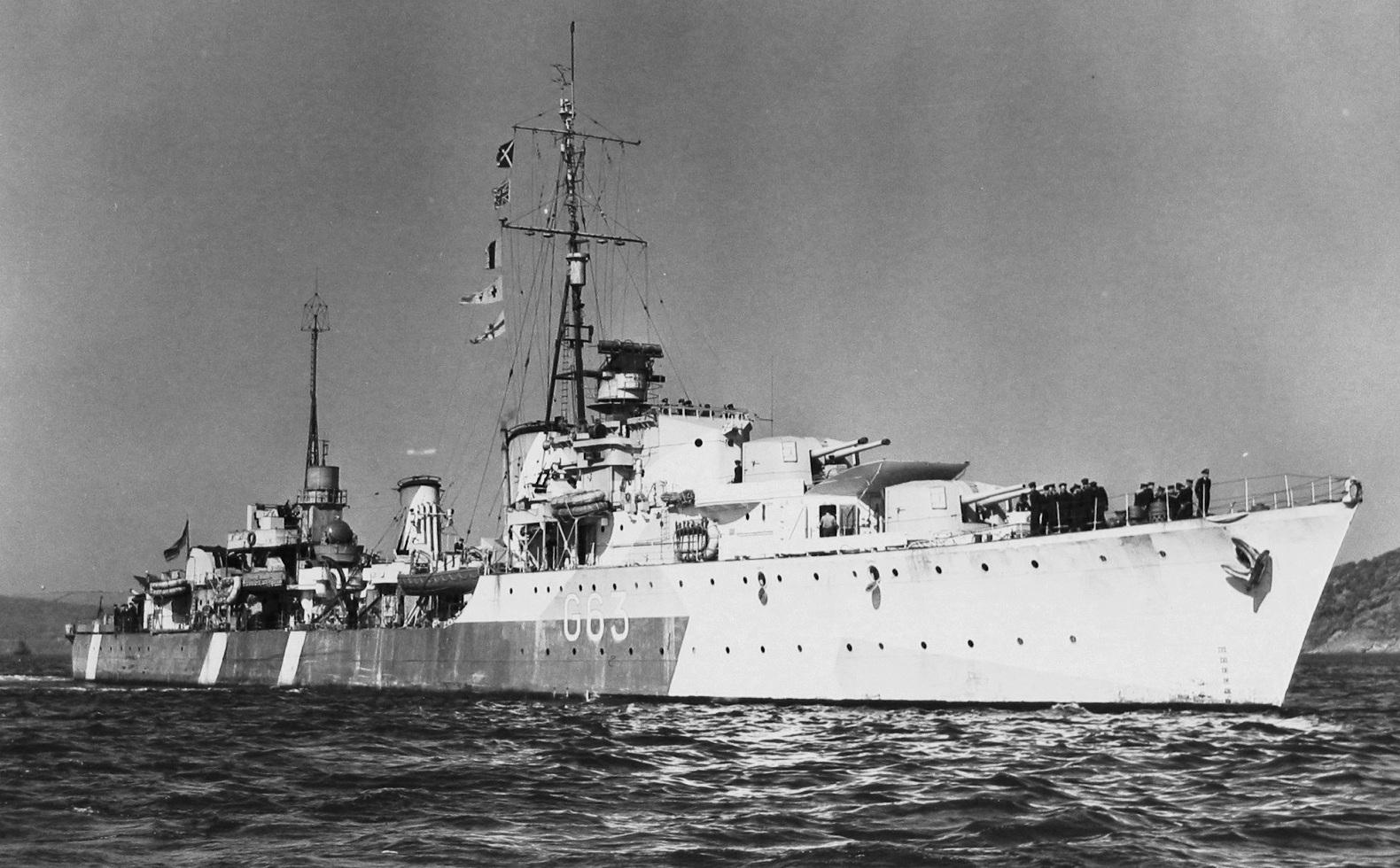
Haida during World War II

On 15 November the convoy JW 54A sailed from Loch Ewe. Haida was among the destroyers that joined the escort from 18 to 24 November 1943. On 28 November Haida was among the destroyer escort for the Russian convoy RA 54B, protecting it until it reached Loch Ewe on 9 December without loss. The convoy JW 55B sailed from Loch Ewe for Russia on 20 December. Haida was a member of its ocean escort. The German battleship Scharnhorst was deployed to intercept the convoy. While the cruisers escorting the convoy kept the German vessel at bay, Haida and the other escorting destroyers shepherded the convoy away from danger until the German battleship was sunk by a British force. On 23 December the convoy was attacked by Junkers Ju 88 bombers, but escaped unscathed. Haida joined the escort of RA 55B on the return journey to the UK which sailed from Kola Inlet on 31 December and arrived on 8 January 1944.

=== Operations along the French coast ===
On 10 January 1944, she was reassigned to the 10th Destroyer Flotilla at Plymouth and took part in the Operation Tunnel and Operation Hostile sweeps in the Bay of Biscay and along the French coast of the English Channel. The 10th Flotilla, with the cruisers Black Prince and Bellona, formed Force 26. By April, Haida had sailed on nineteen of the Operation Tunnel/Hostile missions.

During the night of 25/26 April, Haida, with Black Prince and the destroyers Ashanti, Athabaskan, and Huron engaged the German 4th Torpedo Boat Flotilla comprising the German Elbing-class torpedo boats T29, T24, and T27. Despite the German designation as 'torpedo boat', the Elbings were essentially on a par with mid-sized Allied destroyers, having just slightly smaller armament. T27 was hit early and retired to Morlaix, Haida sank T29, and T24 was damaged before making St. Malo.

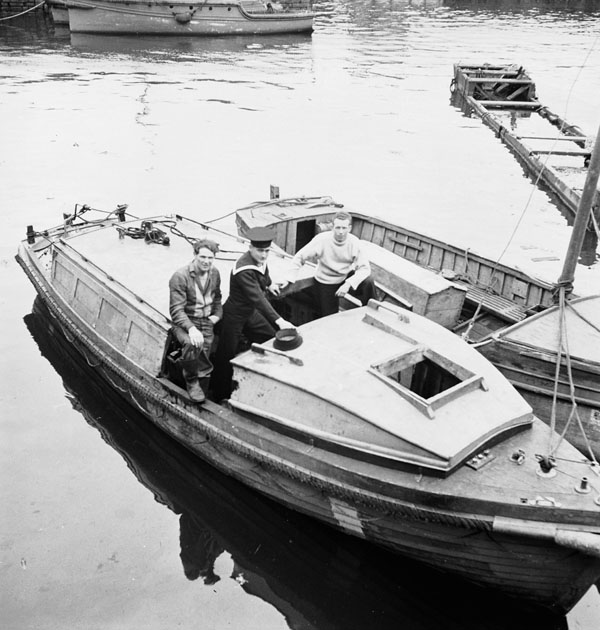
Haida's motor cutter, which was used to rescue survivors of the sinking of HMCS Athabaskan on 29 April 1944

On the night of 28/29 April T24 and T27 attempted to move from St. Malo to Brest and encountered the destroyers Athabaskan and Haida off St. Brieux, which were performing a covering sweep as part of Operation Hostile. Athabaskan was torpedoed and sunk in the engagement. T24 is credited with the sinking the ship. Haida ran T27 aground and set the vessel afire with shelling, to be later destroyed by MTB 673. Of the Athabaskan's crew 128 were lost, 44 survivors were recovered by Haida, and 83 survivors became prisoners of war of the Germans in France.

Haida continued the Operation Hostile sorties in company of sister ship Huron during the weeks leading up to Operation Overlord. The 10th Destroyer Flotilla were part of the covering force for surface attacks at the western entrance of the English Channel during the invasion of Normandy. On 8–9 June, Haida was part of Task Force 26 which engaged the German 8th Destroyer Flotilla, comprising Z32, Z24, ZH1 and T24 northwest of the Île de Bas. Haida and Huron combined to sink Z32 in the Battle of Ushant. Following the fall of Cherbourg to the Allies, the German E-boats were transferred to Le Havre, freeing up the 10th Flotilla. The flotilla was then given the dual role of covering Allied motor torpedo boat flotillas, and search and sink missions against German shipping along the French coast.

On 24 June, while on patrol in the English Channel off Land's End, investigated a 311 Squadron's Liberator bomber dropping depth charges on a target. Haida and the British destroyer Eskimo began their own depth charge attacks after being informed that a submarine had been spotted. After several attacks, the submarine surfaced and attempted to run. Haida and Eskimo fired all their guns and sank U-971;Haida rescued six survivors. On 14/15 July 1944, Haida and ORP Błyskawica intercepted a group of German ships in the Île de Groix area near Lorient. The battle saw two submarine chasers, UJ 1420 and UJ 1421, destroyed, one German merchant ship sunk, and two others set afire. On 5–6 August, Haida was part of a force engaged in an Operation Kinetic sweep. The force attacked a German convoy north of the Île de Yeu and sank the minesweepers M 263 and M 486, the patrol boat V 414 and the coastal launch Otto. During the battle a shell exploded in one of Haida's turrets and started a fire, killing two and injuring eight, knocking the turret out of action. Staying in the line of battle, the destroyers were engaged by shore batteries when they attempted to take on a second convoy and were forced to withdraw without doing much damage to the German merchant vessels.

=== Refit and northern operations ===
Haida departed Western Europe on 22 September for Halifax, Nova Scotia, arriving on 29 September. The destroyer returned to Scapa Flow in mid-January 1945 after refitting to receive new radar. On 19 March Haida escorted aircraft carriers in minelaying operations off Granesund, Norway, and assisted in attacks on shipping off Trondheim from 24 to 28 March. On 7 April, Haida escorted seven anti-submarine warfare vessels from Greenock, Scotland, destined for Soviet use at Vaenga, on the Kola Inlet. The destroyer was among the escort for convoy JW 66 that set out from the River Clyde on 16 April. Haida experienced one of the last RCN engagements of the Second World War when she escorted convoy RA 66 from Vaenga from 29 April to 2 May. The convoy was attacked in transit, and Haida and Huron were attacked by torpedoes fired by U-boats, which narrowly missed. In the skirmish, two German U-boats and the British frigate Goodall were sunk, and the convoy escaped in a snowstorm. Haida and Huron returned to Scapa Flow on 6 May and were assigned to relief operations at Trondheimsfjord, Norway, on 17 May. From 29 to 31 May, Haida, Huron, the cruiser Berwick and the 5th Escort Group were sent to Trondheim to take over custody of surrendered U-boats.

Haida, Huron and Iroquois, left for Halifax on 4 June to refit as part of Canada's contribution to Operation Downfall. They arrived on 10 June, and Haida started a tropicalization refit, which was suspended after the surrender of Japan later that summer. Haida was paid off on 20 March 1946.

=== Cold War operations ===
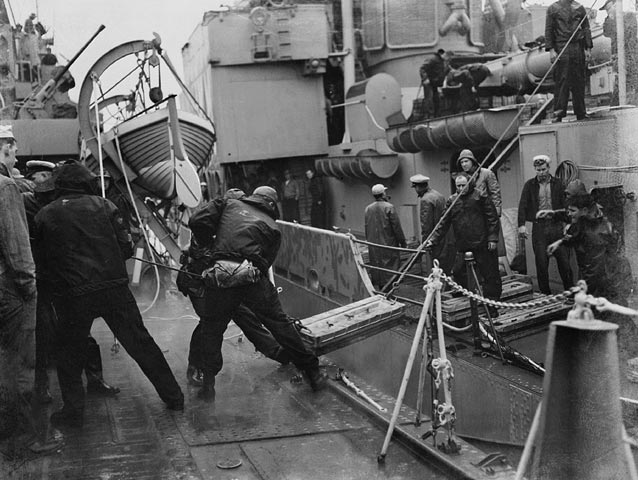
USS Buck transferring four-inch ammunition to Haida

Haida was in inactive reserve for approximately one year but was prepared for reactivation in 1947 and underwent a refit for updated armament and sensors. This involved replacing the main armament, with the 4.7-inch guns removed and two twin Mk XVI 4-inch gun mounts installed forward and a twin 3-inch (76 mm)/50 calibre gun mount installed aft. (Note: The 50 calibre denotes the length of the gun. This means that the length of the gun barrel is 50 times the bore diameter.) The ship was given a Mk 63 fire control director for its guns. One turret was completely removed and replaced by two Squid anti-submarine mortars placed on the quarterdeck. A short aluminum mast was installed and the funnels were fitted with caps.

Haida was equipped with Type 275, SPS-10, SPS-6, Type 293 and 262 radars and Type 140 and 174 sonars. While in refit, fire gutted the wheelhouse and boiler tubes burst later during speed trials. She returned to the fleet, still carrying the pennant number G63, in May 1947.

Haida and her sister ship HMCS Nootka participated in exercises between the Royal Canadian Navy’s Atlantic Fleet and the United States Navy and Royal Navy over the next several years. They were the first Royal Canadian Navy ships to penetrate Hudson Bay in the fall of 1948. On 4 June 1949, Haida and Nootka were participating in exercises with the aircraft carrier HMCS Magnificent off Port Mouton, Nova Scotia, when the carrier ran aground. Both destroyers attempted to free the ship from the rocks but were unsuccessful. Ultimately, the carrier used ballast to move off the rocks and limped back to its home port in Halifax, approximately 120 kilometres northeast, escorted by the destroyers. In November 1949, Haida rescued the 18 crew members of a United States Air Force B-29 bomber that had crashed in the Atlantic Ocean. That December, Haida was downgraded to a depot and accommodation ship in Halifax.

When the Korean War started on 25 June 1950, Haida was once again activated for war duty. She was converted to a destroyer escort and began refit in July 1950, with various new armaments, sensors and communications systems. She was recommissioned on 15 March 1952 and carried the pennant DDE 215. She departed Halifax on 27 September for Sasebo, Japan, arriving there on 6 November after passing through the Panama Canal.

Haida relieved Nootka on 18 November off the west coast of Korea, and had an uneventful patrol, performing aircraft carrier screening and inshore patrol missions, returning to Sasebo to replenish on 29 November. She patrolled off the east coast of Korea beginning on 4 December and took part with the destroyer escort USS Moore in shelling of a railway yard in Songjin, a coastal battery, and North Korean troops. On 18–19 December, Haida failed to join the exclusive "Trainbusters Club" when an enemy train she attacked managed to hide in a nearby tunnel. Haida returned to patrol on 3 January 1953, escorting aircraft carriers and bombarding the coast. On 29 January, Haida entered the "Trainbusters Club", destroying a train north of Riwon. The destroyer eliminated a second train on 26 May, and detonated a drifting anti-ship mine on her return to Paengyang-do. She departed Sasebo on 12 June, heading west through the Suez Canal and arrived in Halifax on 22 July 1953.

Haida departed Halifax for a second Korean tour on 14 December 1953, passing through the Panama Canal and arriving in theatre on 5 February 1954. North Korea and China were not respecting the cease fire; infractions necessitated a naval presence around South Korea. The destroyer departed the Korean theatre on 12 September 1954 and headed for Halifax via the Suez Canal once again, arriving on 1 November.

Following the Korean operations, Haida embarked on Cold War anti-submarine warfare duties with other NATO units in the North Atlantic and West Indies. In May 1956, Haida, accompanied by Iroquois and Huron made port visits to cities and towns along the Saint Lawrence River.

Haida's aging hull and infrastructure was becoming troublesome, and in January 1958 she went into refit for hull repairs and protection for electronic equipment. Further refits in 1959 corrected various problems, and she sailed for the West Indies in January 1960; however, further equipment failures culminating in the failure of her steering gear on 3 April forced her to return to Halifax. A hull survey in May found extensive corrosion and cracking, forcing her into drydock for the remainder of the year. She undertook further repairs in June and July 1961 after further cracking was found during operations in heavy seas that March. More cracks were detected in March 1962, which forced a refit through February 1963.

== Preservation ==
With the writing on the wall, Haida undertook her last assignment, a summer tour of the Great Lakes. She departed Halifax on 25 April 1963 with a mobile television studio on board. She undertook various public tours and weapons training during the tour; one of the individuals to tour her was a former RCN rating named Neil Bruce. Bruce foresaw that she was destined for scrapping and formed Haida Inc. with four others as a means of attempting to acquire her for preservation. On 30 April 1963, the ship was paid off for the last time.

Haida returned to Halifax and was placed in Category C reserve at the navy base HMCS Protector in Sydney. Crown Assets announced Haida would be scrapped in 1964 as part of cutbacks to the RCN. Haida Inc. bid $20,000 and won possession on the grounds of restoration. After preparing the ship, the RCN towed the vessel to Marine Industries Limited shipyard at Sorel, Quebec, where she became civilian property.

The Naval Reserve Division HMCS York provided a skeleton crew for Haida as she was towed to Toronto by two tugboats. Haida was supposed to have been greeted by a civilian flotilla that included Toronto's new fireboat giving water spray salute. However, delays meant the flotilla plan was cancelled and she arrived in the midnight hour and docked at the foot of York Street at Pier 6. She was officially handed over in a ceremony on 25 August 1964 with the guests of honour being three of her former captains: retired Vice-Admiral Harry DeWolf, who was the destroyer's first commanding officer (1944–1945); Rear-Admiral Robert Philip Welland, 1945; and Commodore John Charles, the ship's captain during the Korean War.

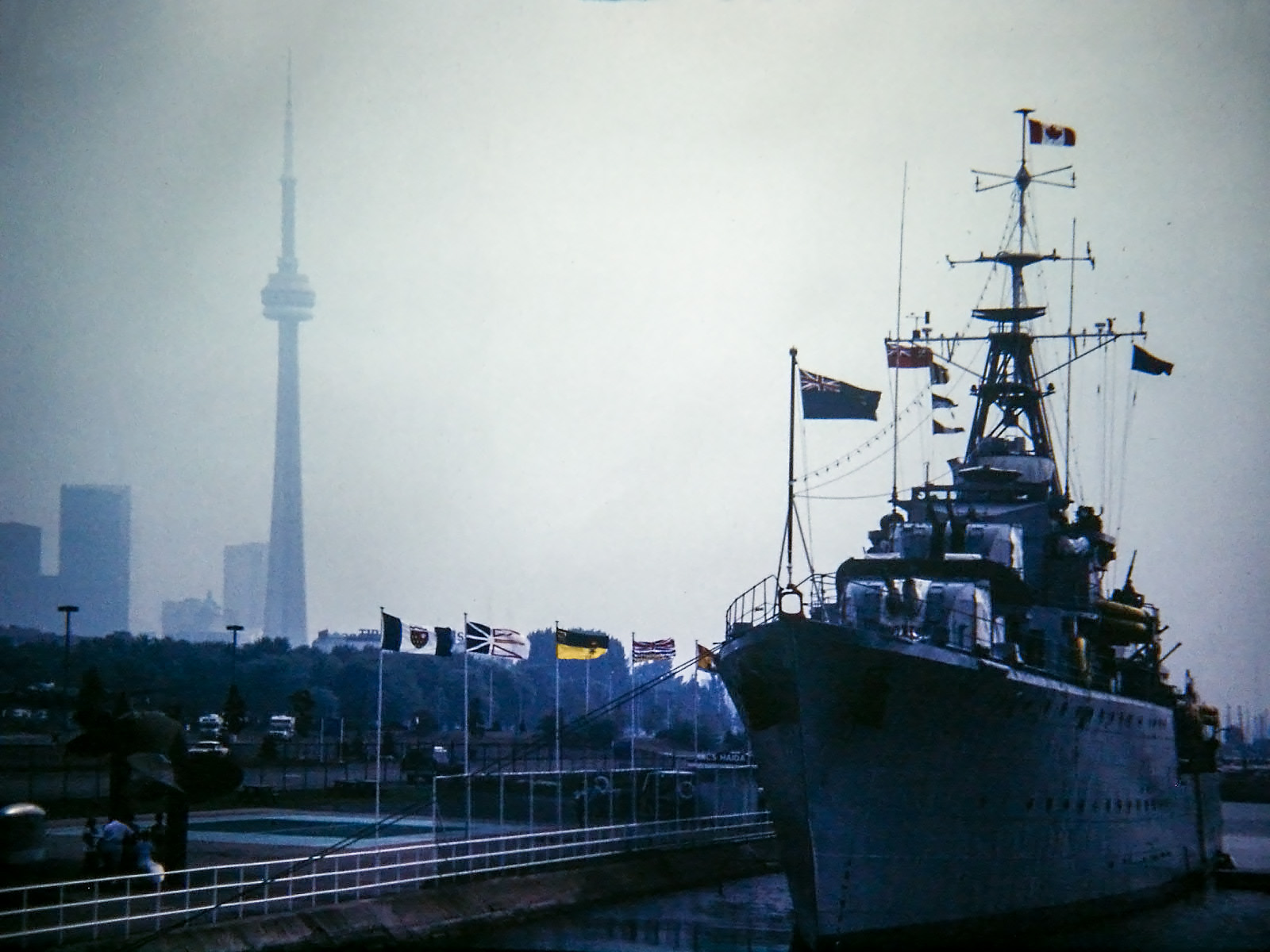
HMCS Haida docked in Toronto in 1983

She opened as an attraction in August 1965 at the pier on York Street. Initially the city of Toronto had planned to build a "Serviceman's Memorial Park" near the Princes' Gates at nearby Exhibition Place to link with the Haida preservation efforts. The organization Haida Inc. ran into financial difficulties during the late 1960s, and title to the ship was transferred to the provincial government for $1. In 1970, Haida was moved to Ontario Place at the west end of the Toronto waterfront, where it was turned into an attraction until 2002.

The guns on the vessel were fired whenever the Toronto Symphony Orchestra (TSO) played Tchaikovsky's 1812 Overture at the nearby Forum, the outdoor in-the-round concert stage at Ontario Place. During the 1970s, the vessel was also used as a Royal Canadian Sea Cadets training facility during the months that ship was open to the public. In November 1984, she was designated an historic site by the Government of Canada, "to recognize her role in naval combat; because she is the last of the Tribal Class Destroyers."

== Move to Hamilton Harbour ==
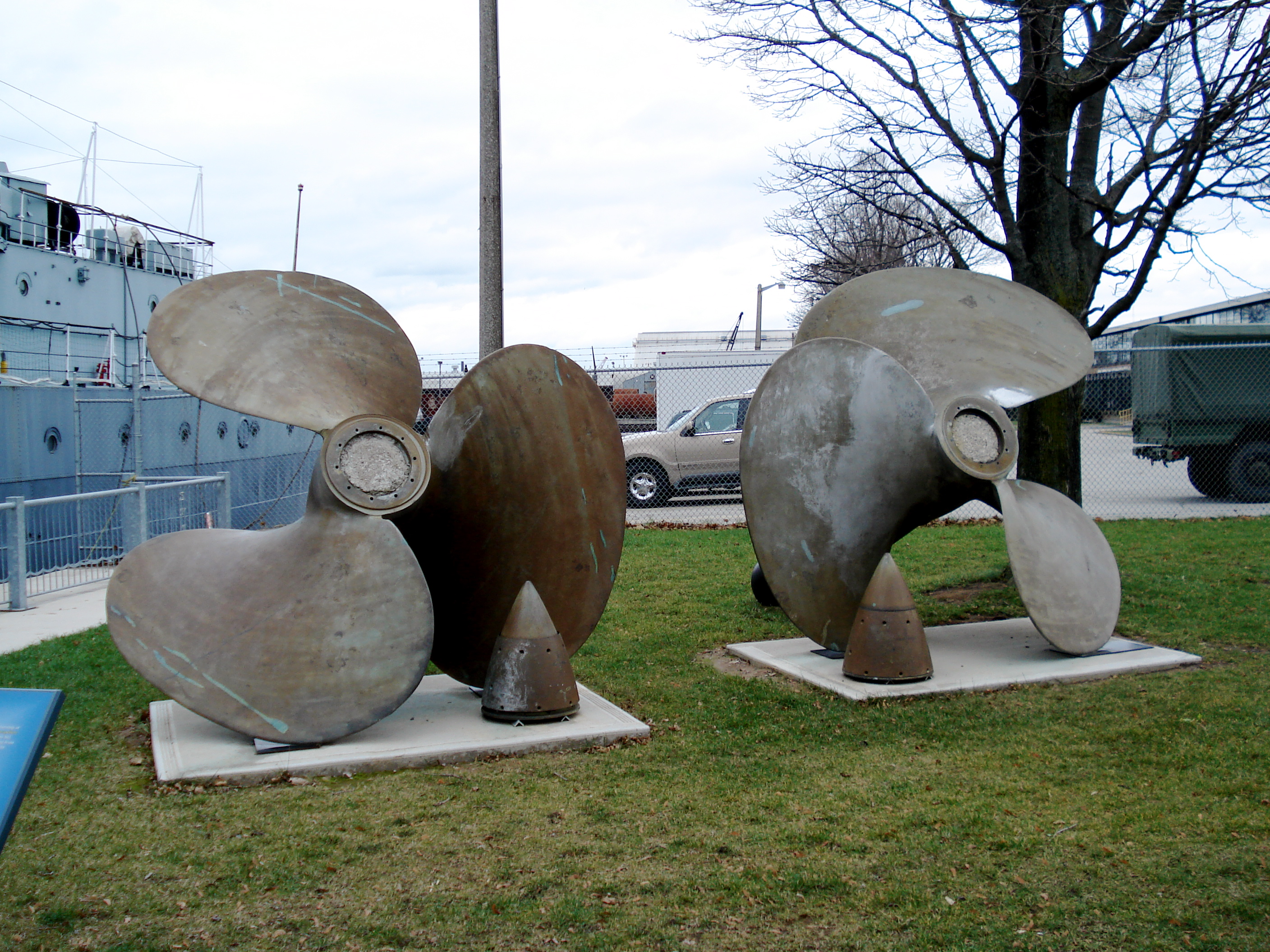
Haida's propellers on display at the historic site

Over many years and administrations, the provincial government ceased to provide adequate attention to the ship’s maintenance. By the late 1990s, it was in a state of disrepair that threatened its continued existence. Parks Canada engineers inspected the ship in spring 1998 and determined that it required approximately $5 million in repairs to remain seaworthy. They also estimated that the ship had approximately five more years of safe public use remaining.

Sheila Copps, the then Minister of Canadian Heritage and a Hamilton Member of Parliament, advocated for Parks Canada to purchase Haida from the Ontario government. The purchase was announced on 18 December 2001. Plans had to be made to get the ship to open water, as an Ontario Place causeway prevented access to the lake. To free the ship, Parks Canada spent $1 million on digging a channel through the causeway to allow the ship to be towed from its Ontario Place dock. The ship departed from Ontario Place on 11 December 2002 and was towed by two tugboats to a shipyard at Port Weller, where it underwent a $5 million hull refit.

After many months of repairs, the ship was towed from St. Catharines to its new home on the Hamilton waterfront. The welcoming ceremony for Haida included a victory lap of Hamilton Harbour, escorted by two Canadian coastal defence vessels, HMCS Glace Bay and HMCS Shawinigan. A flotilla of civilian boats also joined the party in the harbour. Onshore, a planned 11-gun salute between a gun battery and the ship's guns ended up being only a five-gun salute instead. An estimated 10,000 people lined the harbour’s various beaches to view the flotilla, which was the largest such spectacle in the harbour’s history, according to The Hamilton Spectator newspaper. Bayfront Park was the location where 200 former veterans of the ship or Tribal Class ships gathered under a tent to hear Minister Copps deliver the official welcoming remarks and to hear from Jim DeWolf, the son of the ship’s first captain, Harry DeWolf. The date was significant as 30 August 2003 also marked the 60th anniversary of the ship’s commissioning into the Royal Canadian Navy. The destroyer serves as a Parks Canada museum ship on the Hamilton waterfront at Pier 9, next to the Hamilton Naval Reserve Division, HMCS Star.

In July 2006 Haida was "twinned" with the Polish destroyer Błyskawica in a ceremony in Gdynia, Poland. Both ships served in the 10th Destroyer Flotilla during the Second World War. The ceremony was attended by former crew members of both ships and the general public. The ship was visited in 2009 by Charles, Prince of Wales, and his wife, Camilla, Duchess of Cornwall, and, on 29 June 2010, at Government House in Nova Scotia, Prince Philip, Duke of Edinburgh, presented to representatives of HMCS Haida the World Ship Trust Certificate. In September 2016, the ship was towed to Heddle Marine to undergo repairs and upgrades. The repairs took until December 2016 to complete. In February 2018, Haida was designated the ceremonial flagship of the Canadian Navy, now marked by the hoisting of a Haida tribal flag.

=== Affiliations and organizations ===
There is also a Sea Cadet Corps named after the ship, in Streetsville, Mississauga. 186 Royal Canadian Sea Cadet Corps Haida, was established on 9 January 1963. The museum is affiliated with the Canadian Museums Association, Canadian Heritage Information Network, Organization of Military Museums of Canada and the Virtual Museum of Canada.

== See also ==
- List of attractions in Hamilton, Ontario
- List of museum ships
