= German submarine U-971 =

German World War II submarine

History

Nazi Germany
- Name: U-971
- Ordered: 5 June 1941
- Builder: Blohm & Voss, Hamburg
- Yard number: 171
- Laid down: 15 June 1942
- Launched: 22 February 1943
- Commissioned: 1 April 1943
- Fate: Sunk on 24 June 1944

General characteristics
- Class & type: Type VIIC submarine
- Displacement: 769 tonnes (757 long tons) surfaced; 871 t (857 long tons) submerged
- Length: 67.10 m (220 ft 2 in) o/a; 50.50 m (165 ft 8 in) pressure hull
- Beam: 6.20 m (20 ft 4 in) o/a; 4.70 m (15 ft 5 in) pressure hull
- Draught: 4.74 m (15 ft 7 in)
- Installed power: 2,800–3,200 PS (2,100–2,400 kW; 2,800–3,200 bhp) (diesels); 750 PS (550 kW; 740 shp) (electric)
- Propulsion: 2 shafts; 2 × diesel engines; 2 × electric motors
- Speed: 17.7 knots (32.8 km/h; 20.4 mph) surfaced; 7.6 knots (14.1 km/h; 8.7 mph) submerged
- Range: 8,500 nmi (15,700 km; 9,800 mi) at 10 knots (19 km/h; 12 mph) surfaced; 80 nmi (150 km; 92 mi) at 4 knots (7.4 km/h; 4.6 mph) submerged
- Test depth: 230 m (750 ft); Crush depth: 250–295 m (820–968 ft)
- Complement: 4 officers, 40–56 enlisted
- Armament: 5 × 53.3 cm (21 in) torpedo tubes (four bow, one stern); 14 × torpedoes or 26 TMA mines; 1 × 8.8 cm (3.46 in) deck gun (220 rounds); 1 × twin 2 cm (0.79 in) C/30 anti-aircraft gun

Service record
- Part of: 5th U-boat Flotilla; 1 April 1943 – 31 May 1944; 3rd U-boat Flotilla; 1 – 24 June 1944
- Identification codes: M 41 942
- Commanders: Oblt.z.S. Walter Zeplien; 1 April 1943 – 24 June 1944
- Operations: 1 patrol: 8 – 24 June 1944
- Victories: None

German submarine U-971 was a Type VIIC U-boat built for Nazi Germany's Kriegsmarine for service during World War II. She was laid down on 15 June 1942 by Blohm & Voss, Hamburg as yard number 171, launched on 22 February 1943 and commissioned on 1 April 1943 under Oberleutnant zur See Walter Zeplien.

== Design ==
German Type VIIC submarines were preceded by the shorter Type VIIB submarines. U-971 had a displacement of 769 tonnes (757 long tons) when at the surface and 871 tonnes (857 long tons) while submerged. She had a total length of 67.10 m (220 ft 2 in), a pressure hull length of 50.50 m (165 ft 8 in), a beam of 6.20 m (20 ft 4 in), a height of 9.60 m (31 ft 6 in), and a draught of 4.74 m (15 ft 7 in). The submarine was powered by two Germaniawerft F46 four-stroke, six-cylinder supercharged diesel engines producing a total of 2,800 to 3,200 metric horsepower (2,060 to 2,350 kW; 2,760 to 3,160 shp) for use while surfaced, two Brown, Boveri & Cie GG UB 720/8 double-acting electric motors producing a total of 750 metric horsepower (550 kW; 740 shp) for use while submerged. She had two shafts and two 1.23 m (4 ft) propellers. The boat was capable of operating at depths of up to 230 metres (750 ft).

The submarine had a maximum surface speed of 17.7 knots (32.8 km/h; 20.4 mph) and a maximum submerged speed of 7.6 knots (14.1 km/h; 8.7 mph). When submerged, the boat could operate for 80 nautical miles (150 km; 92 mi) at 4 knots (7.4 km/h; 4.6 mph); when surfaced, she could travel 8,500 nautical miles (15,700 km; 9,800 mi) at 10 knots (19 km/h; 12 mph). U-971 was fitted with five 53.3 cm (21 in) torpedo tubes (four fitted at the bow and one at the stern), fourteen torpedoes, one 8.8 cm (3.46 in) SK C/35 naval gun, 220 rounds, and one twin 2 cm (0.79 in) C/30 anti-aircraft gun. The vessel had a complement of between 44 and 60.

== Service history ==
U-971 did not succeed in sinking or damaging any Allied ships.

On 24 June 1944 she was just west of the English Channel on her first patrol when she was depth charged by Liberator C Mk VI heavy bomber FL961/O of the Czechoslovak-manned No. 311 Squadron RAF and two Tribal-class destroyers: the Royal Navy's HMS Eskimo and Royal Canadian Navy's HMCS Haida. U-971 was sunk at 49°01′N 05°53′W with the loss of one member of her crew. 51 men survived and were rescued.

== Bibliography ==
- Busch, Rainer; Röll, Hans-Joachim (1999). German U-boat commanders of World War II: a biographical dictionary. Translated by Brooks, Geoffrey. London, Annapolis: Greenhill Books, Naval Institute Press. ISBN 1-55750-186-6.
- Busch, Rainer; Röll, Hans-Joachim (1999). Der U-Boot-Krieg, 1939-1945: Deutsche U-Boot-Verluste von September 1939 bis Mai 1945 [German U-boat losses from September 1939 to May 1945] (in German). Vol. IV. Hamburg, Berlin, Bonn: Mittler. ISBN 3-8132-0514-2.
- Gough, Barry M; Wood, James A (2001). ""One More for Luck". The Destruction of U971 by HMCS Haida and HMS Eskimo 24 June 1944". Canadian Military History. 10 (3).
- Gröner, Erich; Jung, Dieter; Maass, Martin (1991). U-boats and Mine Warfare Vessels. German Warships 1815–1945. Vol. 2. Translated by Thomas, Keith; Magowan, Rachel. London: Conway Maritime Press. ISBN 0-85177-593-4.
- Vančata, Pavel (2013). 311 Squadron. Sandomierz: Stratus, for Mushroom Model Publications. p. 63. ISBN 978-83-61421-43-6.
