= Tribal-class destroyer (1936) =

Class of 27 British, Australian and Canadian destroyers (1938–63)

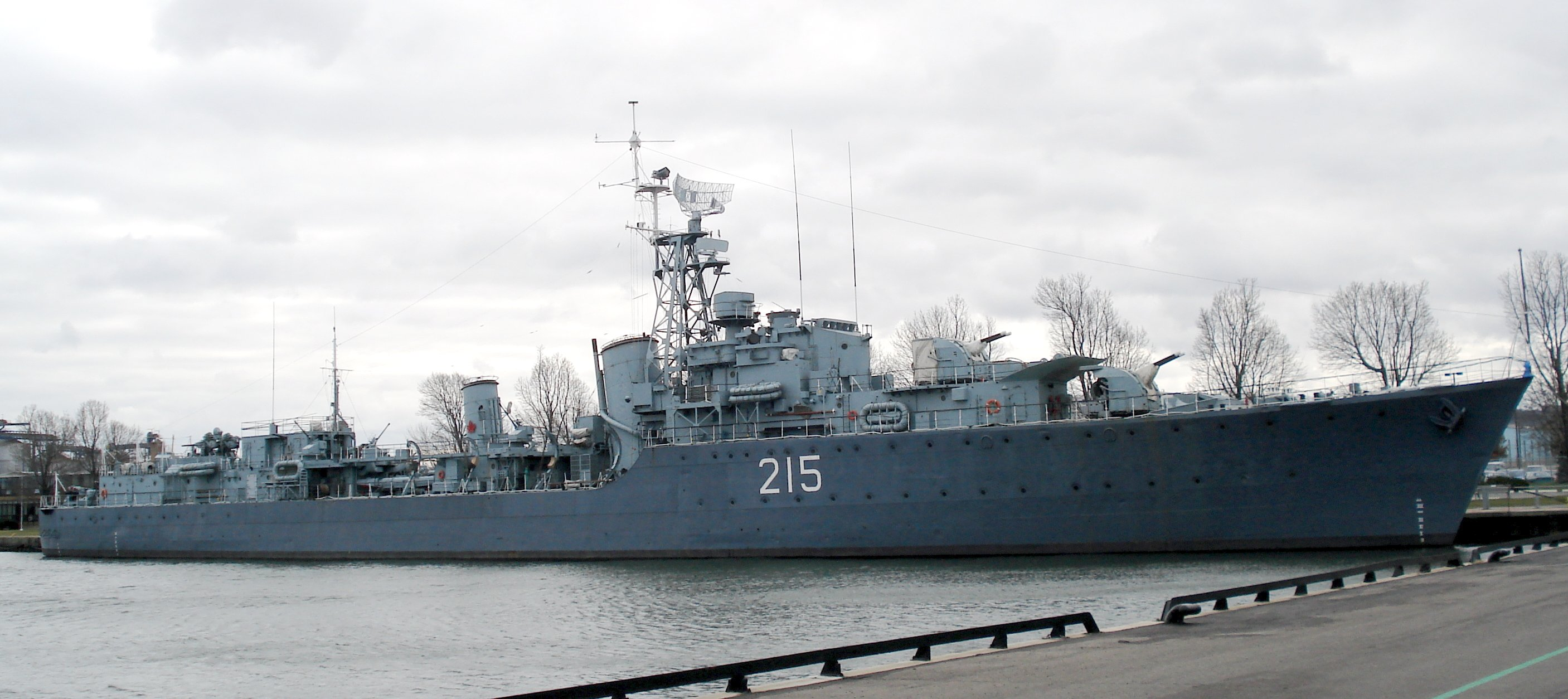
- HMCS Haida, a Canadian Tribal-class destroyer, the only Tribal-class destroyer still existing, at her museum ship mooring in Hamilton, Ontario (2006)

Class overview
- Builders: Vickers Armstrongs; William Denny & Brothers; Fairfield Shipbuilding & Engineering Company; Scotts Shipbuilding & Engineering Company; John I. Thornycroft & Company; Alexander Stephen & Sons; Swan Hunter & Wigham Richardson; Halifax Shipyards; Cockatoo Dockyard
- Operators: Royal Navy; Royal Australian Navy; Royal Canadian Navy
- Preceded by: I class
- Succeeded by: J class
- In commission: 1938–1963
- Planned: 32
- Completed: 27
- Cancelled: 5
- Lost: 13
- Scrapped: 13
- Preserved: 1

General characteristics
- Type: Destroyer
- Displacement: 1,854 long tons (1,884 t) (standard); 2,520 long tons (2,560 t) (deep load)
- Length: 377 ft (115 m) (o/a)
- Beam: 36 ft 6 in (11.13 m)
- Draught: 11 ft 3 in (3.43 m)
- Installed power: 3 × Admiralty 3-drum boilers; 44,000 shp (33,000 kW)
- Propulsion: 2 × shafts; 2 × geared steam turbines
- Speed: 36 knots (67 km/h; 41 mph)
- Range: 5,700 nmi (10,600 km; 6,600 mi) at 15 knots (28 km/h; 17 mph)
- Complement: 190 (219 in flotilla leaders)
- Sensors & processing systems: ASDIC
- Armament: 4 × twin 4.7 in (120 mm) guns; 1 × quadruple 2-pdr (40 mm (1.6 in)) AA guns; 2 × quadruple 0.5 in (12.7 mm) AA machineguns; 1 × quadruple 21 in (533 mm) torpedo tubes; 1 × Depth charge rack, 2 × throwers, 20 depth charges; War modifications: 3 × twin 4.7 in (120 mm) guns; 1 × twin 4 in (102 mm) DP guns; up to 4 × single and twin 20 mm (1 in) AA guns; Cayuga, Athabaskan as built: 4 × twin 4 in DP guns; 1 × twin, 4 × single 40 mm (1.6 in) AA guns; 1 × quadruple 21 in torpedo tubes; 1 × rack, 2 × throwers for DCs; Canadian DDE modernisation: 2 × twin 4 in DP guns; 1 × twin 3 in (76 mm) guns; 4 × single 40mm/56 Bofors guns; 1 × quadruple 21 in torpedo tubes; 2 × Squid anti-submarine mortars

The Tribal class, or Afridi class, is a class of destroyers built for the Royal Navy, Royal Canadian Navy and Royal Australian Navy that saw service in World War II. Originally conceived during design studies for a light fleet cruiser, the Tribals evolved into fast, powerful destroyers, with greater emphasis on guns over torpedoes than previous destroyers, in response to new designs by Japan, Italy, and Germany. The Tribals were well admired by their crews and the public when they were in service due to their power, often becoming symbols of prestige while in service.

As some of the Royal Navy's most modern and powerful escort ships, the Tribal class served with distinction in nearly all theatres of World War II. Only a handful of Royal Navy Tribals survived the war, all of which were subsequently scrapped from hard use, while Commonwealth Tribals continued to serve into the Cold War, serving with distinction in the Korean War. Only one Tribal survives: HMCS Haida, as a museum ship in Hamilton Harbour, Ontario, Canada.

== Design history ==
From 1926, all Royal Navy destroyers had descended from a common lineage based upon the prototypes Amazon and Ambuscade. During the interwar period, advances in armament and machinery meant that by the mid-1930s these "interwar standard" destroyers were being eclipsed by foreign designs, particularly from Japan, Italy, and Germany. To counteract this trend, the Admiralty decided on a new destroyer type, with an emphasis on gunnery over torpedo warfare. The destroyer was based on 'Design V', a design study for a small fleet cruiser (another variant of this design evolved into the Dido-class cruiser). This design envisioned a 1,850-ton ship with a speed of 36.25 knots (67.14 km/h; 41.72 mph), an endurance of 5,500 nautical miles (10,200 km; 6,300 mi), and five twin 4.7 inch guns as main armament.

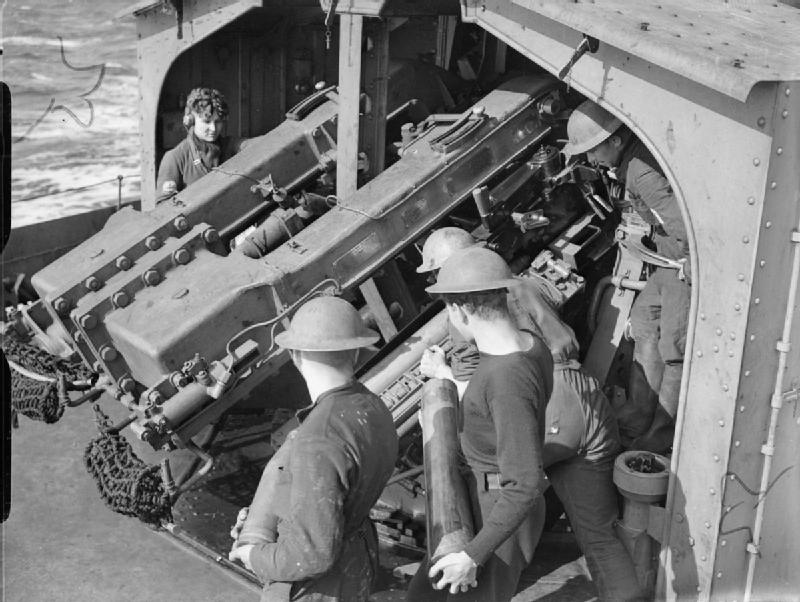
A twin Mk.XII mounting on HMS Javelin

Although the design was rejected for the fleet cruiser role, by August 1935, after no fewer than eight design proposals, it had evolved to present a destroyer with eight 4.7 inch Quick Firing Mark XII guns, in four twin mountings, with a maximum elevation of 40°, controlled by a low-angle (LA) director and high-angle / low-angle (HA/LA) rangefinder director above the bridge. To provide close range anti-aircraft protection the design was fitted with a quadruple Mark VII QF 2 pdr "pom pom" mounting, and two quadruple Vickers .50-inch machine guns. These ships introduced the Fuze Keeping Clock High Angle Fire Control Computer, which was used on all subsequent British wartime destroyers. The ships were also armed with a quadruple bank of torpedo tubes. They were considered to be handsome ships, with a clipper bow that provided excellent seakeeping and two raked funnels and masts. They are still remembered with great affection.

== Construction ==
The Royal Navy placed an order for seven Tribals on 10 March 1936, with a second group of nine Tribals ordered on 9 June for two flotillas' worth of ships. The Royal Australian Navy and Royal Canadian Navy both ordered a flotilla of Tribals. The eight Australian ships were to be built in Australian shipyards. Three were completed, two in 1942 and one in 1945, but the rest were cancelled. The Canadian order was for four ships from British yards in 1940 (completed in 1942 and 1943) and another four from Canadian yards at Halifax in 1942. The latter were not completed until after the war.

Between 1937 and 1945, twenty-seven Tribals were built. Estimated cost per ship was around £340,000 excluding weaponry, and £520,000 overall.

== Modifications ==
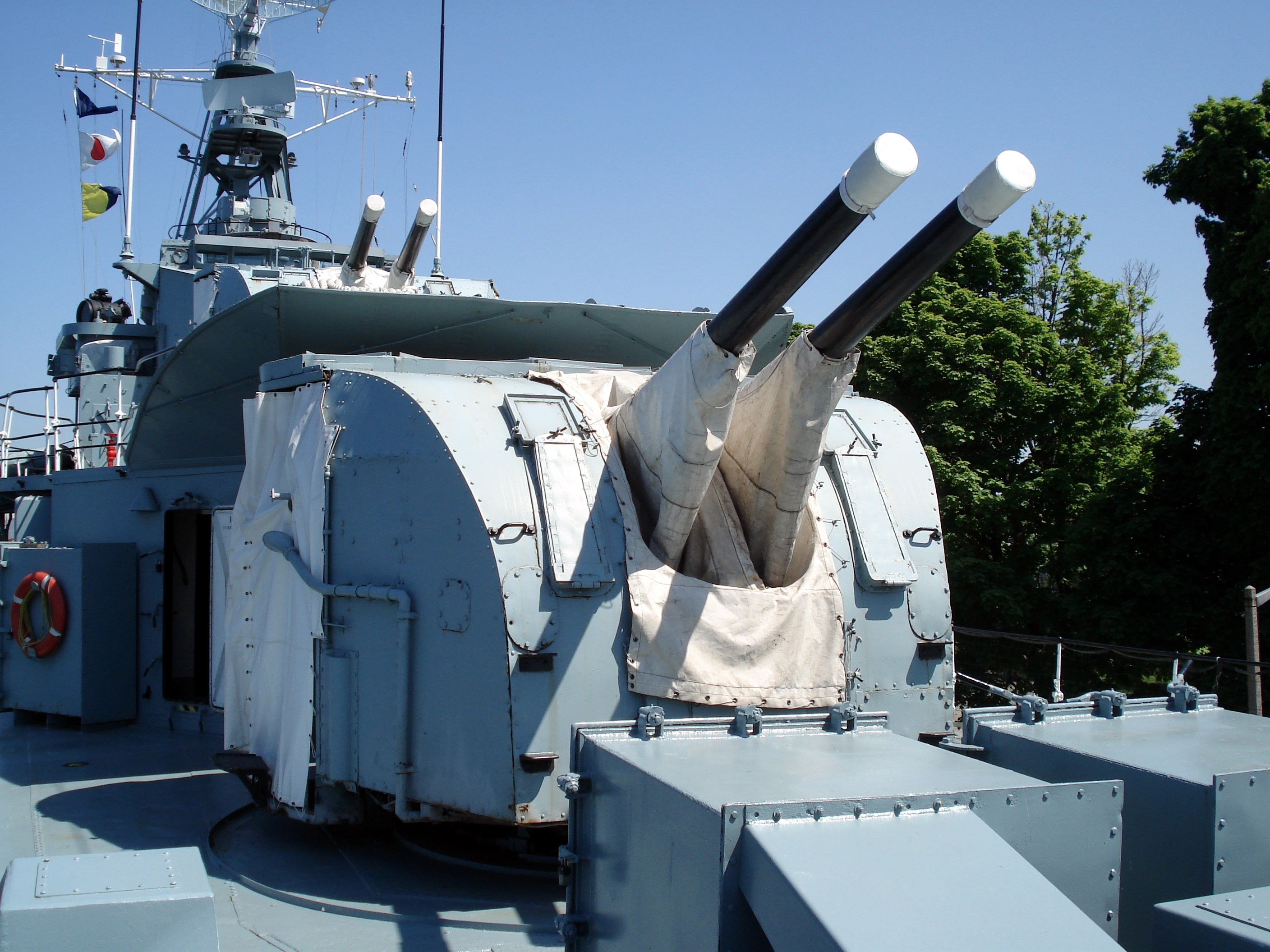
Twin QF 4-inch Mk XVI naval guns of HMCS Haida

=== Wartime modifications ===
The Royal Navy equipped the Tribal class with a comparatively heavy anti-aircraft armament; all eight 4.7in guns could engage aircraft with predicted fire using the FKC computer, and thus provide a powerful augmentation to the battle-fleet's AA defence. The close range AA armament of a quad 2pdr and two quad Vickers machine guns was a marked advance over previous destroyer classes and heavier than most other nations' close range destroyer armament in 1939. However, prewar, the Royal Navy assumed that destroyers would be acting mainly as escorts for the battle-fleet, and would not be the primary focus of aerial attack and would not require more than 40-degree elevation for the main armament. Events soon showed that destroyers often functioned independently and so became the main target of Luftwaffe attack, especially by dive bombers. After the loss of Afridi and Gurkha, the remaining ships were taken in hand to improve the situation. Each ship's 'X' turret, which held a 4.7-inch mounting, was removed and replaced by two QF 4-inch (102 mm) Mark XVI guns on the twin HA/LA Mark XIX mounting. The mainmast was cut down and the rear funnel was lowered to improve the arcs of fire for the anti-aircraft weapons. As they became available, the more effective 20 mm Oerlikon guns were added, at first adding to and eventually replacing the .50 in./12.7 mm machine guns. Depth charge storage was also increased, from 30 to 46 charges. Furthermore, the class initially had problems with leaks in feedwater tanks; this was traced to issues with the turbine blades caused by structural stress when steaming at high speed in rough weather.

By 1944, the four surviving British Tribals were given a tall lattice foremast to carry a Type 293 radar target indication and Type 291 air warning, with Type 285 radar added to the rangefinder-director. The first two Canadian built Tribals, Micmac and Nootka, were armed with the then standard armament of three 4.7-inch twin mountings and a single twin 4-inch mount, with the 4.7-inch mounts being given improved A.A. fuze setters, while the last two Canadian-built Tribals were equipped with eight Mark XVI guns with R.P.C. and four to six Bofors 40 mm guns as standard, along with a Mk VI Director.

=== Post-war modifications ===
Post war, survivors of the class met different fates: Royal Navy Tribals were retired by the 1950s, while Tribals in service with the Australian and Canadian navies continued in service, with many refitted as anti-submarine destroyers. The British-built Canadian Tribals landed their 4.7-inch guns, and received a pair of 4-inch Mark XVI guns in twin mounts in the 'A' and 'B' positions instead, improving anti-aircraft capabilities, a pair of Squid mortars for anti-submarine warfare, and a twin 3 inch/50 Mark 33 gun on the 'X' position as an anti-aircraft weapon. Sensors were also upgraded for their new roles. Refitted Canadian Tribals continued to serve until the 1960s.

Two of the Australian Tribals, Arunta and Warramunga, were modernised during the early 1950s. The aft-most 4.7-inch (120 mm) gun mounting was removed, with the space modified to accommodate a Squid anti-submarine mortar. New sonar and radar units were fitted, the latter requiring the replacement of the tripod radar mast with a stronger lattice structure. Although the modernisation was intended to take less than six months per ship, it took two years for each ship to be refitted, by which time their modifications had already become obsolete. Financial restrictions meant that the third Australian Tribal, Bataan, was not modernised, and a combination of manpower shortages and rapid obsolescence saw all three ships decommissioned by the end of the 1950s.

== Ships ==
=== Royal Navy ===
Construction data
Name	Builder	Laid down	Launched	Commissioned	Fate
Afridi	Vickers Armstrongs, Walker	9 June 1936	8 June 1937	3 May 1938	Lost 3 May 1940 to aircraft attack
Ashanti	William Denny & Brothers, Dumbarton	23 November 1936	5 November 1937	21 December 1938	Sold for scrap, 12 April 1949
Bedouin	William Denny & Brothers, Dumbarton	13 January 1937	21 December 1937	15 March 1939	Lost 15 June 1942 to torpedo bomber attack after being disabled by Italian cruisers Raimondo Montecuccoli and Eugenio di Savoia
Cossack	Vickers Armstrongs, Walker	9 June 1936	8 June 1937	7 June 1938	Lost 24 October 1941, torpedoed by U-563
Eskimo	Vickers Armstrongs, Walker	5 August 1936	3 September 1937	30 December 1938	Sold for scrap, 27 June 1949
Gurkha	Fairfield Shipbuilding & Engineering Company, Govan	6 July 1936	7 July 1937	21 October 1938	Lost 9 April 1940, to aircraft attack
Maori	Fairfield Shipbuilding & Engineering Company, Govan	6 July 1936	2 September 1937	2 January 1939	Lost 12 February 1942 to aircraft
Mashona	Vickers Armstrongs	5 August 1936	3 September 1937	28 March 1939	Lost 28 May 1941 to aircraft attack
Matabele	Scotts Shipbuilding & Engineering Company, Greenock	1 October 1936	6 October 1937	25 January 1939	Lost 17 January 1942, torpedoed by U-454
Mohawk	John I. Thornycroft & Company, Woolston	16 July 1936	15 October 1937	7 September 1938	Lost 16 April 1941, torpedoed by Italian destroyer Luca Tarigo
Nubian	John I. Thornycroft & Company, Woolston	10 August 1936	21 December 1937	6 December 1938	Sold for scrap, 11 June 1949
Punjabi	Scotts Shipbuilding & Engineering Company, Greenock	1 October 1936	18 December 1937	29 March 1939	Lost 1 May 1942, rammed by King George V
Sikh	Alexander Stephen & Sons, Linthouse	24 September 1936	17 December 1937	12 October 1938	Lost 14 September 1942 to coastal artillery
Somali	Swan Hunter & Wigham Richardson, Wallsend	26 August 1936	24 August 1937	12 December 1938	Lost 20 September 1942, torpedoed by U-703, sank while under tow
Tartar	Swan Hunter & Wigham Richardson, Wallsend	26 August 1936	21 October 1937	10 March 1939	Sold for scrap, 6 January 1948
Zulu	Alexander Stephen & Sons, Linthouse	10 August 1936	23 September 1937	7 September 1938	Lost 14 September 1942 to aircraft attack

=== Royal Canadian Navy ===
Construction data
Name	Builder	Laid down	Launched	Commissioned	Fate
Iroquois (ex-Athabaskan)	Vickers Armstrongs, Newcastle	19 September 1940	23 September 1941	10 December 1942	Sold for scrap, 1966
Athabaskan (I) (ex-Iroquois)	Vickers Armstrongs, Newcastle	31 October 1940	18 November 1941	3 February 1943	Lost 29 April 1944, torpedoed by German torpedo boat T24
Huron	Vickers Armstrongs, Newcastle	15 July 1941	25 June 1942	28 July 1943	Sold for scrap, 1965
Haida	Vickers Armstrongs, Newcastle	29 September 1941	25 August 1942	18 September 1943	Preserved as museum ship, 1964
Micmac	Halifax Shipyards, Halifax	20 May 1942	18 September 1943	14 September 1945	Sold for scrap, 1964
Nootka	Halifax Shipyards, Halifax	20 May 1942	26 April 1944	9 August 1946	Sold for scrap, 1964
Cayuga	Halifax Shipyards, Halifax	7 October 1943	28 July 1945	20 October 1947	Sold for scrap, 1964
Athabaskan (II)	Halifax Shipyards, Halifax	15 May 1944	4 May 1945	12 January 1947	Sold for scrap, 1969

=== Royal Australian Navy ===
Construction data
Name	Builder	Laid down	Launched	Commissioned	Fate
Arunta	Cockatoo Island Dockyard, Sydney	15 November 1939	30 November 1940	30 April 1942	Sold for scrap 1969, foundered en route to breakers off Broken Bay
Warramunga	Cockatoo Island Dockyard, Sydney	10 February 1940	2 February 1942	23 November 1942	Sold for scrap, 1963
Bataan (ex-Kurnai)	Cockatoo Island Dockyard, Sydney	18 February 1942	15 January 1944	25 May 1945	Sold for scrap, 1958

== Service ==
As some of the Royal Navy's most modern and powerful escorts, they were widely deployed in World War II, and served with great distinction in nearly all theatres of war. The Tribals were often selected for special tasks, and as a result losses were heavy, with 12 of the 16 Royal Navy Tribals and one Canadian ship sunk. Gurkha has the rare and unfortunate distinction of being the name of two ships that were sunk in World War II: the L-class destroyer Larne was renamed to honour the lost Tribal-class ship, and was herself lost in 1942.

=== 1940 ===
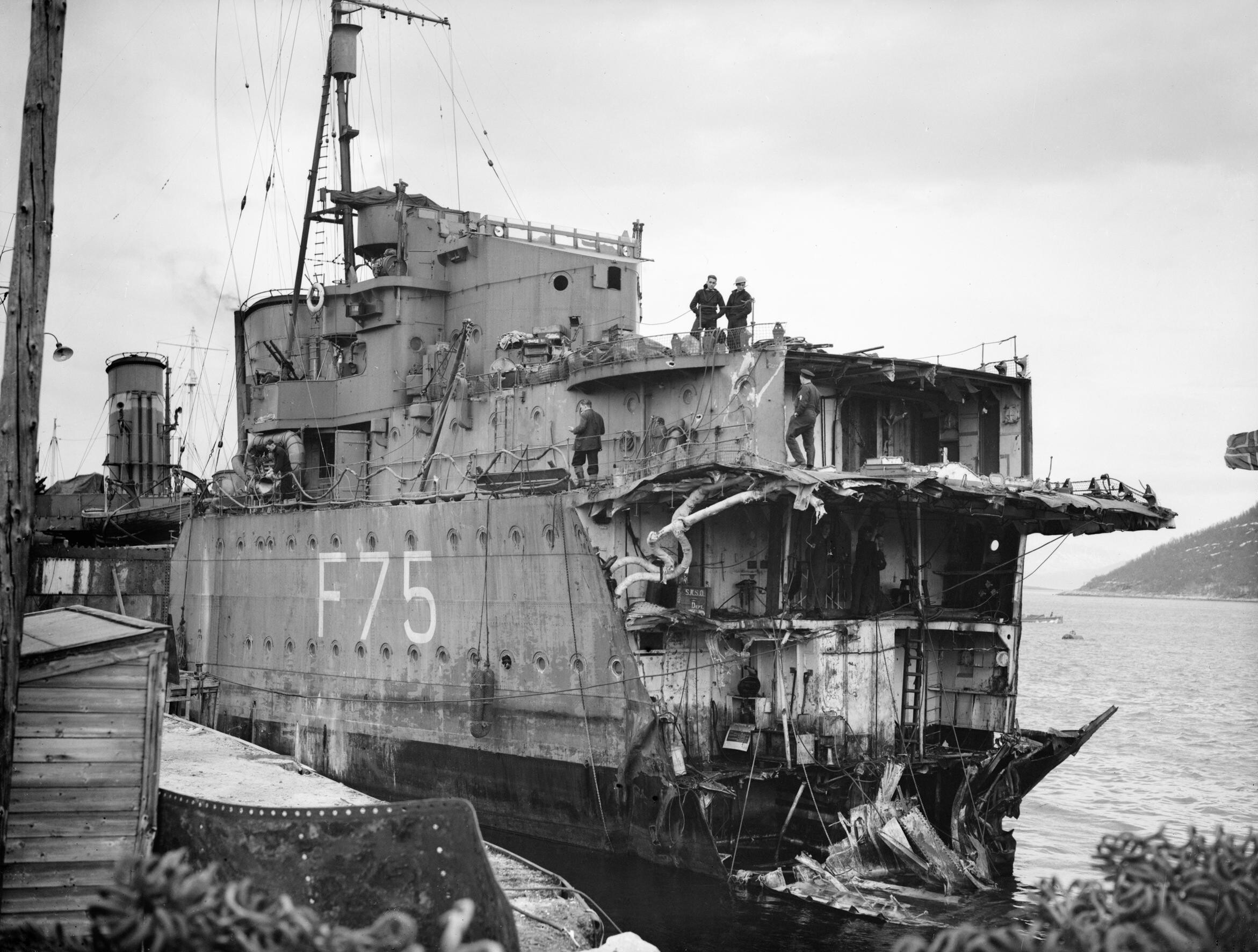
HMS Eskimo showing bow damage, Norway May 1940. This image shows the Director Control Tower (D.C.T.), which controlled the main armament when engaging surface targets, immediately abaft the open bridge. Abaft, and above the D.C.T. is the Rangefinder-Director which housed a 12ft rangefinder. The Rangefinder-Director provided ranges to the D.C.T. and directly controlled the main armament when engaging aircraft.

Cossack earned fame early on in the war, when on 6 February 1940, commanded by Captain Philip Vian, she pursued and then boarded the German tanker Altmark in neutral Norwegian waters in a daring attack to rescue around 300 British prisoners-of-war on board. Referred to as the Altmark Incident, this was the last true naval boarding action for the Royal Navy. Gurkha was an early loss, being sunk by German bombers off Stavanger. Afridi was lost soon afterwards to dive bombers while evacuating troops from Namsos. Bedouin, Punjabi, Eskimo and Cossack took part in the Second Battle of Narvik, where Eskimo had her bow blown off.

=== 1941 ===
In May 1941, Somali, Bedouin, and Eskimo, along with the N-class destroyer HMAS Nestor, and Royal Navy cruisers Edinburgh, Manchester, and Birmingham boarded the German weather ship München, retrieving vital Enigma cypher codebooks. In the same month, Zulu, Sikh, Cossack, Maori and Polish ORP Piorun (N-class destroyer) were in action against the German battleship Bismarck, with Mashona being sunk by German aircraft during these operations. In the Mediterranean Sea, Mohawk was lost as part of "Force K", torpedoed by the Italian destroyer Luca Tarigo in April, while Cossack, Sikh, Zulu, and Maori took part in Operation Substance, a relief convoy heading to Malta. Cossack was torpedoed by U-563 in October while escorting Convoy HG 74 in the Atlantic Ocean, west of Gibraltar, sinking later under tow. Maori and Sikh were amongst the victors at the Battle of Cape Bon in December. Bedouin took part in Operation Archery, a British combined operations raid which diverted German resources to Norway for the rest of the war.

=== 1942 ===
In 1942, Matabele was torpedoed and sunk by U-454 in the Barents Sea and Maori was hit in the engine room by a bomb whilst lying in Grand Harbour, Valletta, in February, catching fire and later blowing up where she lay. Punjabi was accidentally rammed and sunk by the battleship King George V in May, whilst performing close escort in thick weather. In June, Bedouin was disabled in action with Regia Marina's cruisers Raimondo Montecuccoli and Eugenio di Savoia during Operation Harpoon. Although later taken in tow by HMS Partridge the tow had to be cast when the Italian cruisers reappeared and, dead in the water, Bedouin was sunk by aircraft torpedo attack. Ashanti was assigned to Operation Pedestal of August 1942. In September, the final two Tribals lost in the Battle of the Mediterranean were sunk; Sikh and Zulu during a disastrous raid on Tobruk. Also that month, Somali was torpedoed by U-703 while covering the returning Russian Convoy QP 14. Although taken under tow by Ashanti, she sank four days later after heavy weather broke her back. This was the last Royal Navy Tribal lost during the war.

=== 1943 ===
In 1943, the four remaining British Tribals (Ashanti, Eskimo, Tartar, and Nubian) participated in Operation Retribution to prevent the Afrika Korps from being evacuated to Italy. Tartar, Nubian and Eskimo then covered the Allied invasion of Sicily. After the invasion of Sicily, the four then covered the Allied invasion of Italy at Salerno. Ashanti and Athabaskan then covered Arctic convoy RA 55A, which was involved in the Battle of North Cape, where the German battleship Scharnhorst was sunk.

At the same time, the two active Australian Tribals, Arunta and Warramunga, were attached to the joint Australian-American Task Force 74 and supported a series of landings in New Britain, and deployed to support a series of landings in Operation Cartwheel.

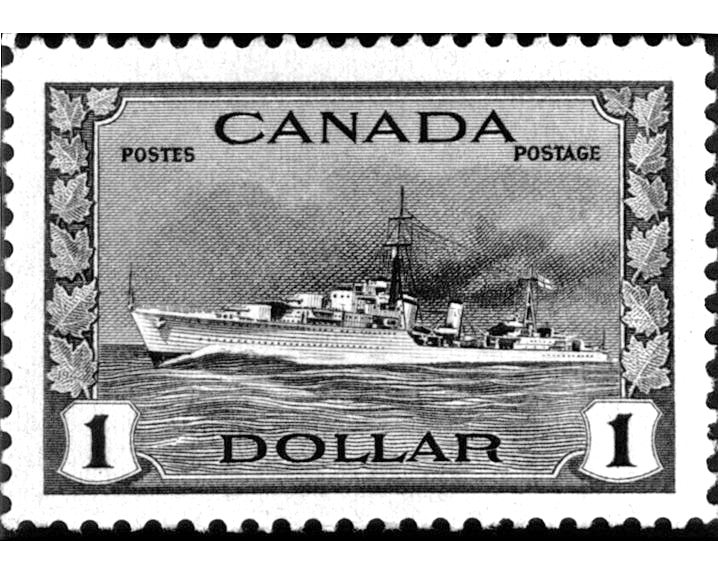
A 1944 Canadian postage stamp showing a Tribal-class destroyer

The Canadian Tribals were also heavily engaged; Athabaskan was hit by German glide bombs while conducting operations in the Bay of Biscay and was put out of action for almost three months, while Haida and Huron escorted the various Arctic convoys.

=== 1944 ===
Eskimo, Ashanti, Athabaskan, Haida, Huron, Nubian, Tartar and later Iroquois saw extensive action in the English Channel before and after Operation Overlord, sinking or damaging a variety of enemy ships.

In April, HMCS Athabaskan and Haida engaged two Elbing-class torpedo boats in the Channel. Athabaskan was sunk by a torpedo from T24, while Haida pursued and forced aground T27. Afterward, Haida returned and managed to rescue 42 personnel from Athabaskan. One of the under-construction Canadian Tribals was then renamed Athabaskan as a tribute to the lost ship. During the Normandy invasion, Eskimo, Tatar, Ashanti, Haida and Huron sank, damaged, or drove ashore the Elbing-class torpedo boat T24, the Narvik-class destroyers Z24 and Z32, and the ex-Dutch destroyer Gerard Callenburgh in a series of battles. Haida and Eskimo also sank the German U-boat U-971 with depth charges and close-in gunfire, rescuing 53 survivors. Afterwards Eskimo was involved in a collision with the destroyer HMS Javelin, which kept Eskimo out of action for five months.

After the Normandy invasion, Nubian was sent to screen Royal Navy Home Fleet units engaged in the protection of the Russian Convoy JW 59, and carrier-based aerial attacks on the German battleship Tirpitz and elsewhere in Norway. Iroquois and Haida met up with the Free French cruiser Jeanne d'Arc which was sailing from Algiers to Cherbourg carrying members of the French Provisional Government. Iroquois then escorted the liner RMS Queen Mary which was carrying the British Prime Minister Winston Churchill to the Second Quebec Conference.

=== 1945 ===
Eskimo, Nubian, and Tartar were given some minor tropicalisation refits and were sent east to join the British Eastern Fleet in the Indian Ocean as the Atlantic war wound down. There, Eskimo, Nubian, and Tartar engaged in escort of the Royal Navy major surface units and shore bombardment. Afterward, Nubian, and Tartar were waiting as backup for Battle of the Malacca Strait, where the Japanese cruiser Haguro was sunk. Eskimo and Nubian were then engaged in anti-shipping patrols, sinking a Japanese merchant ship and a submarine-chaser near Sumatra. This was the last Royal Navy surface action against shipping in World War II. In July, Nubian and Tartar prepared for Operation Zipper, the planned British landings in Malaya.

During this period, the Canadian Tribals continued to be engaged; Haida, Huron and Iroquois escorted Russian convoys until May 1945, when Germany surrendered. The Canadian Tribals then engaged in the escort of British warships liberating Norway following the German surrender. Iroquois then joined the British cruisers Dido and Devonshire and destroyer Savage at Copenhagen and headed to Wilhelmshaven, as escort for the surrendered German cruisers Prinz Eugen and Nürnberg. Following this the Canadian Tribals returned to Halifax harbour for tropicalisation refits, which were suspended when the Japanese surrendered; they were sent into reserve.

== Post-war ==
Twenty-three Tribal-class destroyers were constructed before and during World War II; sixteen for the Royal Navy, four for the Royal Canadian Navy, and three for the Royal Australian Navy. Thirteen were lost during the war; six British Tribals to aircraft attack, four British and one Canadian Tribal to torpedo attacks, one British Tribal to shore batteries off Tobruk, and one British Tribal in a collision with a British battleship.

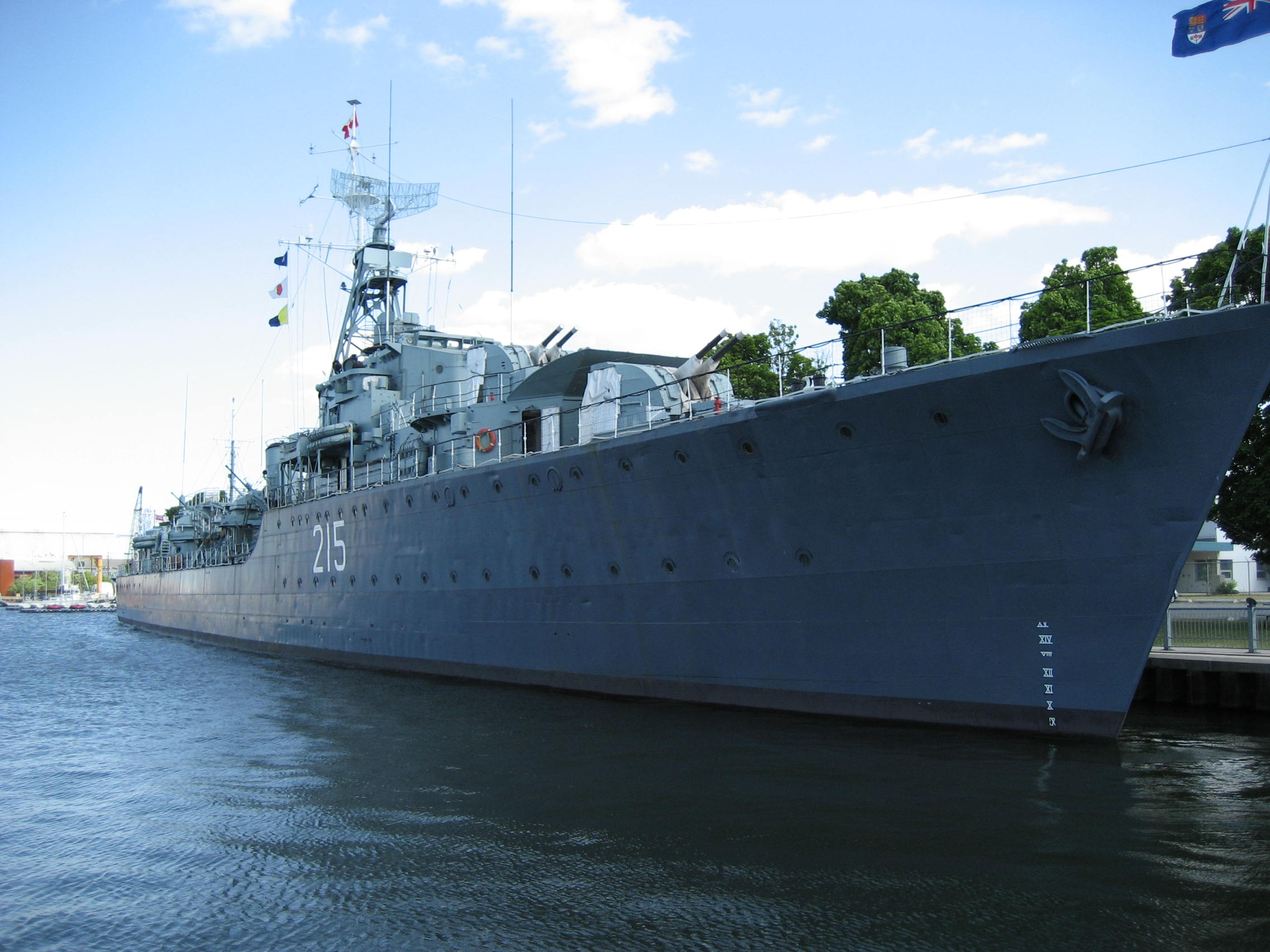
HMCS Haida, museum ship in Hamilton, Ontario

The surviving four British destroyers were paid off and sold for scrap during 1948 and 1949, while the Australian and Canadian Tribals were refitted and modernised for post-war service. Four destroyers still under construction in Canada when World War II ended were completed and then modernised, while five ships under construction in Australia were cancelled.

The Australian and Canadian ships, with the exception of Micmac, served during the Korean War, with Bataan at one point escorting a United States aircraft carrier with the same name. The Australian and Canadian Tribals continued in service until the late 1950s and early 1960s, when they were gradually decommissioned and sold for scrapping.

Only one ship of the class has been preserved. HMCS Haida was restored and is docked in Hamilton Harbour, Ontario, Canada as a museum ship. The bow of HMS Maori, sunk on 12 February 1942 by German aircraft, rests 13 m (43 ft) below sea level in Valletta's Marsamxett Harbour, Malta, and is a popular scuba diving site.

== In fiction ==
The fictional Tribal-class destroyer Hakka is the setting for the 2001 Douglas Reeman novel For Valour.
