= HMS Black Prince (81) =

British World War II light cruiser

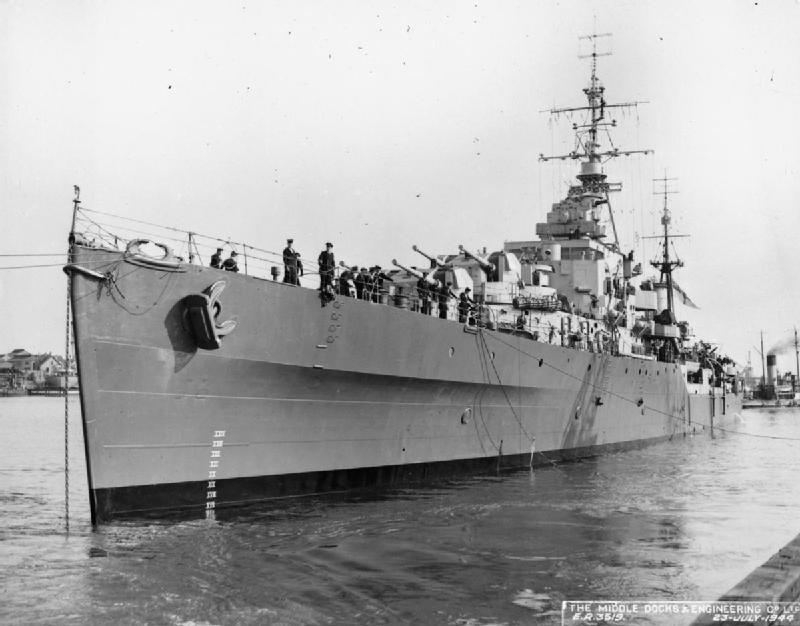
- Black Prince at anchor on the River Tyne, July 1944

History

United Kingdom
- Name: Black Prince
- Namesake: Edward, the Black Prince
- Builder: Harland & Wolff, Belfast, Northern Ireland
- Yard number: 1049
- Laid down: 2 November 1939
- Launched: 27 August 1942
- Completed: 20 November 1943
- Commissioned: 30 November 1943
- Decommissioned: March 1962
- Out of service: Loaned to the Royal New Zealand Navy, 25 May 1946
- Fate: Scrapped, 2 May 1962
- Notes: Pennant number: 81

New Zealand
- Name: HMNZS Black Prince
- Commissioned: 25 May 1946
- Out of service: Returned to Royal Navy control, 1 April 1961

General characteristics (as built)
- Class & type: Dido-class light cruiser
- Displacement: 5,950 tons (standard); 7,200 tons (full load)
- Length: 485 ft (148 m) (pp); 512 ft (156 m) (oa)
- Beam: 50.5 ft (15.4 m)
- Draught: 14 ft (4.3 m)
- Installed power: 4 Admiralty 3-drum boilers; 62,000 shp (46 MW)
- Propulsion: 4 shafts; 4 geared steam turbines
- Speed: 32.25 knots (59.73 km/h; 37.11 mph)
- Range: 6,824 km (3,685 nmi; 4,240 mi) at 16 knots (30 km/h; 18 mph)
- Complement: 530
- Armament: 8 × QF 5.25-inch (133 mm) dual guns, 6 × 20 mm dual AA guns, 3 × 2-pounder (40-mm) pom-poms quad guns, 2 × 21-inch (530 mm) triple torpedo tubes
- Armour: Belt: 3 in (76 mm); Deck: 1 in (25 mm); Magazines: 2 in (51 mm); Bulkheads: 1 in (25 mm)

HMS Black Prince was a Dido-class light cruiser of the Royal Navy, of the Bellona subgroup. The cruiser was commissioned in 1943, and served during World War II on the Arctic convoys, during the Normandy landings, and as part of the British Pacific Fleet. In 1946, the cruiser was loaned to the Royal New Zealand Navy, becoming HMNZS Black Prince. The cruiser was docked for modernisation in 1947, but in April, her sailors walked off the ship as part of a series of mutinies in the RNZN. The shortage of manpower resulting from these mutinies meant that the modernisation had to be cancelled, and Black Prince was placed in reserve until 1953. She returned to service after refitting with simplified secondary armament with a single quad "pom pom" in Q position and eight Mk3 40mm Bofors guns. The ship was decommissioned again two years later, and returned to the Royal Navy in 1961. Black Prince did not re-enter service, and was towed from Auckland to Osaka for scrapping in 1962.

== Design and construction ==
"Black Prince" was a modified Dido design, sometimes called Dido Group 2, or the Bellona subgroup with only four 5.25-inch mounts instead of five, and improved anti-aircraft armament. She was built by Harland & Wolff of Belfast, Northern Ireland, with her keel being laid down on 2 November 1939. She was launched on 27 August 1942, and completed on 20 November 1943.

Black Prince was named after Prince Edward (1330-1376), the eldest son of King Edward III.

== Operational history ==
=== Royal Navy ===
After commissioning, Black Prince served on Arctic convoys and then came south in preparation for the invasion of Europe, being employed on offensive sweeps against German coastal convoy traffic. On the night of 25 and 26 April 1944, accompanied by Canadian destroyers, she was involved in the action which sank the torpedo boat T29 and damaged T24 and T27 off the north Brittany coast.

During the Normandy landings, she was part of Force "A" of Task Force 125 in support of Utah Beach. Task Force 125 at this time consisted of the battleship USS Nevada, the cruisers USS Quincy, USS Tuscaloosa, Black Prince, the monitor HMS Erebus and several destroyers and destroyer escorts. Black Prince's target was the battery at Morsalines. In August, she moved to the Mediterranean for the invasion of Southern France. She was then sent to Aegean waters in September 1944. On 8 September, Black Prince arrived in Alexandria, Egypt, where she was ordered to sweep the area around Scarpanto and the Gulf of Salonica. On one occasion she bombarded the airfield at Maleme on the island of Crete to prevent German aircraft from taking off.

On 21 November 1944, Black Prince left Alexandria, passed through the Suez Canal into the Red Sea and then on into the Indian Ocean. She arrived at Colombo in Ceylon on 30 November to join the East Indies Fleet where she covered the aircraft carrier raids against Japanese oil installations and airfields in Sumatra and Malaya (Operation Meridian).

On 16 January 1945, she sailed as part of the British Pacific Fleet, seeing action off Okinawa and in the final bombardments of the Japanese mainland before withdrawing to repossess Hong Kong in September.

=== Royal New Zealand Navy ===
After the Japanese surrender, she remained in the Far East, and was transferred to the Royal New Zealand Navy on 25 May 1946. During 1947, the cruiser was docked for modernisation, but this was cancelled following a series of mutinies in April (which included the sailors from Black Prince), as the RNZN no longer had the manpower to operate her. Black Prince was placed in reserve. Work on reactivating the ship began in January 1952, to reduce crew the two multiple Pom Pom AA mounts were temporarily removed and 8 of the unique RNZN 40 mm single electric Toadstool CIWS, installed, in place of Mk 5 twin Oerilikons and she was recommissioned in February 1953. In the same year she took part in the Fleet Review to celebrate the Coronation of Queen Elizabeth II.

The cruiser was decommissioned again in August 1955, and after the decision in the British 1957 Defence White Paper to strike the remaining Royal Navy Dido and Improved Didos as too outdated to be used again or modernized, Black Prince was reduced to extended 3rd class reserve, and used as an accommodation ship for refitting warships and spare part source for Royalist's 1960-1 refit, before reverting to Royal Navy control for disposal in line with its loan terms.

== Fate ==
She was sold for scrap in March 1962 and towed from Auckland on 5 April to the Mitsui & Company, Osaka breakage yards, Japan, by the tug Benten Maru, arriving there on 2 May 1962.
