= HMCS Huron (G24) =

Royal Canadian Navy destroyer

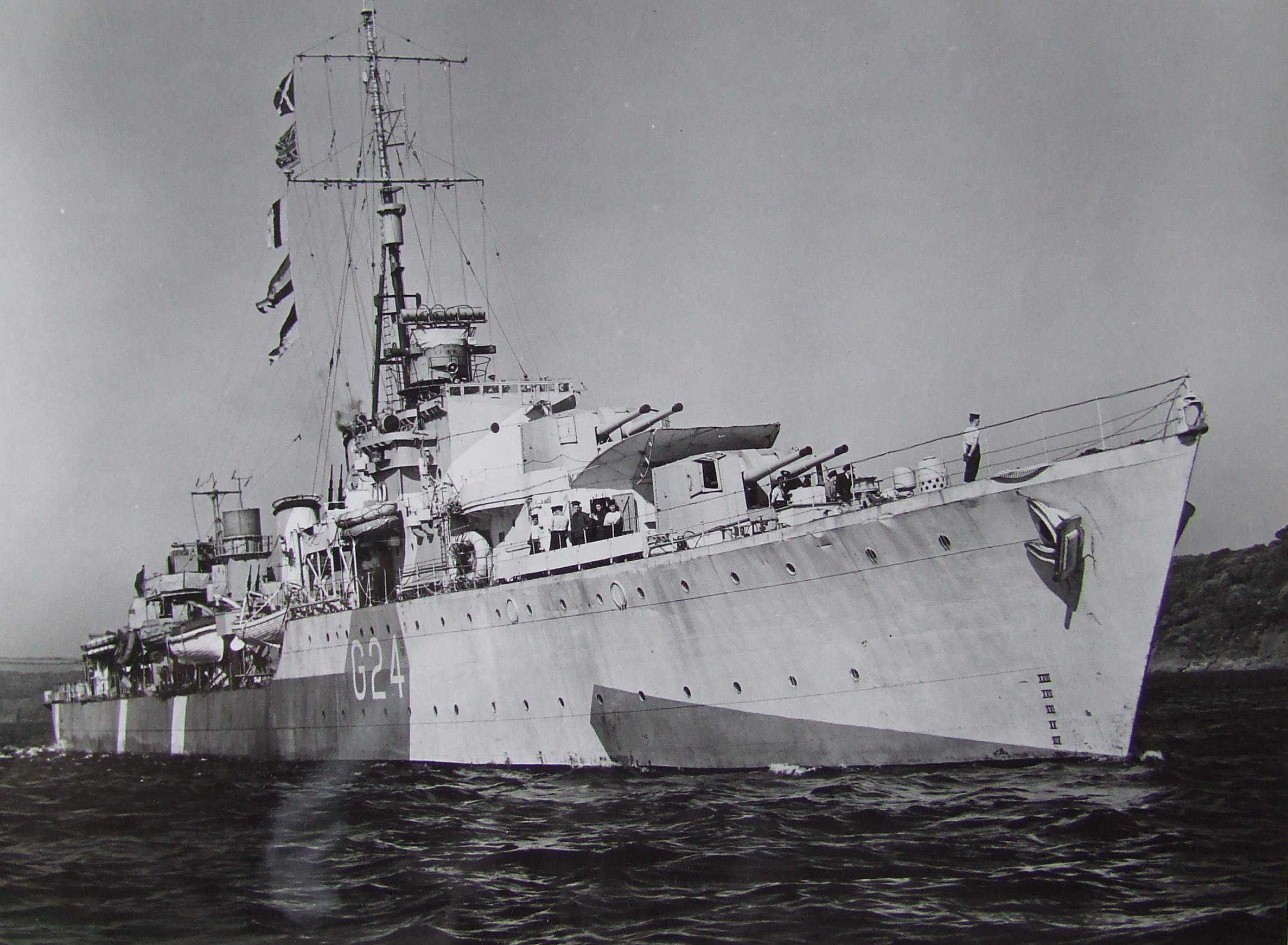
- Huron underway

History

Canada
- Name: Huron
- Namesake: Huron people
- Ordered: 5 April 1940
- Builder: Vickers-Armstrongs, Newcastle upon Tyne
- Laid down: 15 July 1941
- Launched: 25 June 1942
- Commissioned: 28 July 1943
- Decommissioned: 9 March 1946
- Identification: Pennant number: G24
- Recommissioned: 1950
- Decommissioned: 30 April 1963
- Identification: Pennant number: DDE 216
- Motto: Ready the brave
- Honours and awards: Arctic, 1943–1945; English Channel, 1944; Normandy, 1944; Korea, 1951–1953
- Fate: Scrapped, La Spezia, 1965
- Notes: Colours: Gold and crimson
- Badge: Or nicotine bloom Gules seed pod Vert and stamens Or.

General characteristics
- Class & type: Tribal-class destroyer
- Displacement: 1,927 long tons (1,958 t) standard; 2,559 long tons (2,600 t) full load
- Length: 335 ft 6 in (102.3 m) pp; 377 ft (114.9 m) oa
- Beam: 36 ft 6 in (11.1 m)
- Draught: 13 ft (4.0 m)
- Propulsion: 2 shaft Parsons geared steam turbines, 3 Admiralty boilers, 44,000 hp (32,811 kW)
- Speed: 36.5 knots (67.6 km/h; 42.0 mph)
- Range: 5,700 nmi (10,600 km) at 17 kn (31 km/h; 20 mph)
- Complement: 259
- Armament: 6 × 4.7 in (119 mm) guns (3×2); 2 × 4 in (102 mm) guns (1×2); 4 × 2-pounder QF guns (1x4); 6 × 20 mm cannon (6X1); 4 × 21 in (533 mm) torpedo tubes (1×4)

HMCS Huron was a Tribal-class destroyer that served in the Royal Canadian Navy in the Second World War and the Korean War. She was the first ship to bear this name, entering service in 1943. She was named for the Huron people. During the Second World War the vessel saw service in Operation Neptune in the Bay of Biscay and along the French coast in support of the invasion of Normandy and escorted convoys to the Soviet Union. Following the war, the ship was placed in reserve. The destroyer was activated in 1950 as a training ship, but with the onset of the Korean War, was modernized and deployed twice to Korea. Following the war, Huron reverted to a training ship and took part in Cold War-era North Atlantic Treaty Organization (NATO) naval exercises until being paid off for the final time in 1963 and broken up for scrap in 1965.

== Design and description ==
The Tribals were designed to fight heavily armed destroyers of other navies, such as the Japanese Fubuki class. Canada chose the design based on its armament, with the size and power of the Tribal class allowing them to act more like small cruisers than as fleet destroyers. Huron was among the first batch of Tribal-class destroyers ordered by the Royal Canadian Navy in 1940–1941. They were ordered with modified ventilation and heating systems for North Atlantic winter service. Design modifications were made after deficiencies were noted in Iroquois, the lead ship of the Canadian Tribals. Canadian Tribals were a foot longer than their British counterparts and carried an auxiliary boiler for heating and additional power requirements.

Huron, as one of the British-built Tribal-class destroyers, was 335 feet 6 inches (102.3 m) long between perpendiculars and 377 feet (114.9 m) long overall with a beam of 36 feet 6 inches (11.1 m) and a draught of 13 feet (4.0 m). As built, the destroyer had a standard displacement of 1,927 long tons (1,958 t) and 2,745 long tons (2,789 t) at deep load. Huron had a complement of 14 officers and 245 ratings.

The destroyer was propelled by two shafts driven by two Parsons geared turbines powered by steam created by three Admiralty-type three drum boilers. This created 44,000 shaft horsepower (33,000 kW) and gave the ship a maximum speed of 36.5 knots (67.6 km/h; 42.0 mph). The destroyers could carry 505–516 long tons (513–524 t) of fuel oil.

As built, Huron was fitted with six quick firing 4.7-inch (119 mm) Mk XII guns placed in three twin turrets, designated 'A', 'B' and 'Y' from bow to stern. (Note: Mark XII = Mark 12. Britain used Roman numerals to denote Marks (models) of ordnance until after the Second World War.) The turrets were placed on 40° mountings with open-backed shields. The ship also had one twin turret of QF 4-inch (102 mm) Mk XVI guns in the 'X' position. For secondary anti-aircraft armament, the destroyer was equipped with one quad mount 2-pounder "pom-pom" gun and six single Oerlikon 20 mm cannon. The vessel was also fitted with four 21-inch (533 mm) torpedo tubes for Mk IX torpedoes.

The ship was equipped with Type 291 radar for air search, Type 293 radar for target indication and Type 285 radar for 4.7-inch gun control and a DCT controller for the 4-inch guns (working with the Type 285 radar). The radar was carried on a lattice mast and the HF/DF was situated on a pole aft.

== Construction and career ==
Huron was ordered on 5 April 1940 as part of the 1940 shipbuilding programme. However, due to the increased workload on British shipyards due to losses on the continent, her keel-laying was delayed. She was laid down on 15 July 1941 by Vickers-Armstrongs on the River Tyne in England and launched on 25 June 1942. She was commissioned into the Royal Canadian Navy on 19 July 1943 at Newcastle upon Tyne. She was completed on 28 July.

=== Russian convoys ===
After commissioning, Huron was assigned to the 3rd Destroyer Flotilla of the British Home Fleet. From 1–11 October 1943 she carried special supplies and personnel to Murmansk in the Soviet Union as part of Operation Holder. On her return to Scapa Flow she was damaged in a collision with an oiler and spent a month in repair at Leith. After her return from the dockyard she then spent the rest of the year escorting convoys bound for the Soviet Union. She made six escort trips on the Murmansk Run. The first, convoy JW 54A sailed from Loch Ewe on 15 November and Huron joined the escort from 18–24 November. On 28 November, the destroyer was among the escort of convoy RA 54B returning from the Soviet Union and arriving at Loch Ewe on 9 December. Both convoys arrived without loss. Huron was escorting her next convoy, Convoy JW 55B, when it came under attack by German Junkers Ju 88 bombers on 22 December. The convoy escaped unscathed. Huron was present at the Battle of the North Cape on 26 December 1943, for the sinking of the German battleship Scharnhorst, and observed the Royal Norwegian Navy destroyer HNoMS Stord advance to within 400 yards (370 m) and fire torpedoes at the much larger Scharnhorst. The convoy arrived without loss and Huron escorted the return convoy, also without loss. On the next convoy escort mission, Convoy JW 56B, the convoy came under attack during the night of 25/26 January. Three merchant vessels were sunk and the British destroyer HMS Obdurate damaged.

=== Operations along the French coast ===
Huron continued to escort Arctic convoys until February 1944, when she was transferred to the 10th Destroyer Flotilla based at Plymouth to take part in the lead up to the invasion of Normandy. Two operations were run by Plymouth Command in preparation. The first, Operation Tunnel, were patrols against German convoys in the Bay of Biscay and English Channel. In Operation Hostile, the second, the destroyers and cruisers covered minelayers laying minefields in enemy waters. By late April 1944, Huron had carried out eleven Hostile and Tunnel missions. The time between missions was spent training in night-fighting, radar-controlled gunnery, and radar detection.

On 25 April 1944, Huron, along with several other destroyers, encountered three torpedo boats of the German 4th Torpedo Boat Flotilla while performing an Operation Tunnel mission. The result of the engagement saw the Canadian destroyers sink T29 and severely damage the others. Huron was damaged in the action, colliding with HMS Ashanti. This was followed by several more Tunnel and Hostile missions in May 1944, with no encounters with Germans. At the end of May, the 10th Destroyer Flotilla was assigned to the Hurd Deep Patrol, maintaining a patrol line to intercept German surface craft still based at Brest, Cherbourg, and ports in the Bay of Biscay. On D-day, Huron was performing a Hurd Deep patrol, returning to Plymouth that afternoon. Within an hour of their arrival, German naval movement was detected, and the following day Huron and sister ship HMCS Haida sailed to relieve destroyers already on patrol.

On 9 June 1944, as a result of Ultra intercepts, Huron and several other destroyers intercepted a force of German destroyers heading for the Allied invasion fleet in what became known as the Battle of Ushant, off the coast of Brittany. After a fierce gun battle, she assisted Haida in running Z32 aground and pummeling the wreck. Later that month, on 27 and 28 June 1944, while on patrol with fellow Tribal-class destroyer HMS Eskimo, they intercepted a German detachment composed of a heavily armed minesweeper and two naval trawlers. After the destroyers were detected, the Germans attempted to get in closer to shore under the protection of their coastal artillery. Huron sank the minesweeper and a trawler. However, the second trawler severely damaged Eskimo, knocking that destroyer out of action. (Note: Rohwer on page 336 claims the force was a converted trawler M 4611 and one patrol boat V 213. M 4611 was sunk and V 213 was the ship that damaged Eskimo and escaped.) On 8 July 1944, Huron and HMS Tartar attacked two naval trawlers before being driven off by coastal artillery. Rohwer states that Huron and Tartar attacked the German 4th Minesweeping Flotilla off the Channel Islands during the night of 7/8 July. The two destroyers combined to sink two of the minesweepers, M 4605 and M 4601. Plymouth Command ran a final operation in support of the Normandy landings, Operation Kinetic, which was designed to break up German coastal supply. On 31 July 1944, the 10th Destroyer Flotilla sailed from Plymouth and returned on 3 August. They sailed again the next day on what was to be Huron's final patrol before departing for Canada.

=== Refit and end of war ===
In August 1944, Huron returned to Canada to undergo a refit at Halifax, Nova Scotia. She returned to UK waters in November 1944, carrying out escort duties in the Western Approaches. In March 1945, she was transferred to the Home Fleet for screening duties, traveling from Scapa Flow and the River Clyde. On 16 April 1945, Huron sailed for Murmansk on one final Arctic convoy to the Soviet Union, returning to Scapa Flow on 6 May 1945. On the return convoy to Scapa Flow, the last convoy battle of the European war took place. The convoy was attacked by German U-boats, with one member of the escort, HMS Goodall being sunk. Huron, Haida and the cruiser HMS Berwick departed Scapa Flow for Trondheim, Norway, calling in fjords with relief supplies. Upon reaching Trondheim, the Allied units took over custody of surrendered U-boats. Huron returned to Greenock, Scotland on 24 April 1945. In May 1945 she returned to Canada. She began a tropicalization refit to prepare her for possible service in the southern Pacific Ocean. However, this was cancelled due to the surrender of Japan. Following the end of the war, she was decommissioned into the reserve on 9 March 1946.

=== Postwar service ===
In 1950, Huron was recommissioned with the new pennant number 216 for training purposes, but with the onset of the Korean War she was sent overseas. She sailed for her first tour in Korean waters on 22 January 1951. She arrived in theatre on 15 March 1951 and in early April, Huron and sister ship HMCS Athabaskan screened aircraft carriers on the east coast of Korea while they performed airstrikes on Wonsan. In May, Huron transferred to the west coast, screening carriers and performing inshore patrols. During one of her patrols, the destroyer captured a large Chinese junk and its eight crew. In late June, the destroyer switched to the east coast, screening carriers and performing shore bombardment and inshore patrol missions. Huron screened the aircraft carriers HMS Glory and USS Sicily during airstrikes on North Korea, which became known as the "Han River Demonstration" during truce talks in July. Huron left for Canada on 14 August, relieved by Athabaskan.

Upon her return to Canada on 21 September 1951, Huron underwent a major refit, completing in 1953. The refit changed her armament, replacing the 'Y' gun mount with a double Squid anti-submarine mortar mount. Huron's main guns became uniform, with the 4.7-inch guns replaced with 4-inch guns. This was later changed to the guns in mounts 'A' and 'B' remaining as 4-inch guns, but the 'X' mount became a twin 3-inch (76 mm)/50 calibre mount. The anti-aircraft armament was upgraded as well, with four single 40 mm Bofors guns. The DCT was upgraded to a US Mark 63 fire control system and the radars to SPS-6 air search and Sperry surface search models. Her second tour of duty as a member of the Commonwealth Task Force lasted from 18 June 1953 until 5 February 1954. The latter part of that tour was spent during the Armistice period. Her third tour from 1 October to 26 December 1954 was spent with the United Nations fleet monitoring Korean waters. Following her Korean tours she reverted to her training role, taking part in NATO activities until she was paid off into reserve at Halifax on 20 April 1963 and scrapped at La Spezia, Italy in August 1965.

== Legacy ==
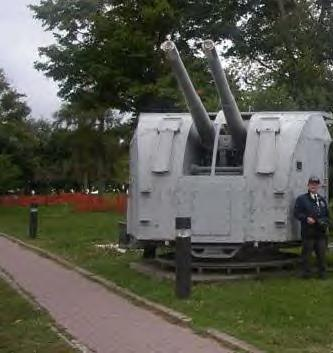
Huron's 'X' turret, Royal Military College of Canada

The 4-inch (102 mm) twin high-angle Mk XIX naval gun turret was removed from Huron and presented to the Royal Military College of Canada in Kingston, Ontario.
