= HMS Ashanti (F51) =

Destroyer of the Royal Navy

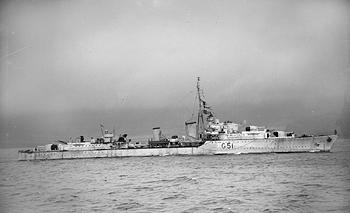
- Ashanti departing Hvalfjörður, Iceland, 6 February 1942

History

United Kingdom
- Name: Ashanti
- Namesake: Ashanti people
- Ordered: 19 June 1936
- Builder: William Denny, Dumbarton
- Cost: £340,770
- Laid down: 23 November 1936
- Launched: 5 November 1937
- Commissioned: 21 December 1938
- Identification: Pennant numbers: L51, F51, G51
- Motto: Kum Apim Beba; (Ashanti: "Kill a thousand and a thousand will come"); Also: Wo kum apim a, apim bз ba
- Honours and awards: 8 battle honours
- Fate: Scrapped, 1949

General characteristics (as built)
- Class & type: Tribal-class destroyer
- Displacement: 1,891 long tons (1,921 t) (standard); 2,519 long tons (2,559 t) (deep load)
- Length: 377 ft (114.9 m) (o/a)
- Beam: 36 ft 6 in (11.13 m)
- Draught: 11 ft 3 in (3.43 m)
- Installed power: 3 × Admiralty 3-drum boilers; 44,000 shp (33,000 kW)
- Propulsion: 2 × shafts; 2 × geared steam turbines
- Speed: 36 knots (67 km/h; 41 mph)
- Range: 5,700 nmi (10,600 km; 6,600 mi) at 15 knots (28 km/h; 17 mph)
- Complement: 190
- Sensors & processing systems: ASDIC
- Armament: 4 × twin 4.7 in (120 mm) guns; 1 × quadruple 2-pdr (40 mm (1.6 in)) AA guns; 2 × quadruple 0.5 in (12.7 mm) anti-aircraft machineguns; 1 × quadruple 21 in (533 mm) torpedo tubes; 20 × depth charges, 1 × rack, 2 × throwers

HMS Ashanti was a Tribal-class destroyer of the Royal Navy. Following the style of her sister ships she was named for an ethnic group, in this case the Ashanti people of the Gold Coast in West Africa. She served in the Second World War and was broken up in 1949. She was the first of two Royal Navy ships to bear the name Ashanti.

== Description ==
The Tribals were intended to counter the large destroyers being built abroad and to improve the firepower of the existing destroyer flotillas and were thus significantly larger and more heavily armed than the preceding I class. The ships displaced 1,891 long tons (1,921 t) at standard load and 2,519 long tons (2,559 t) at deep load. They had an overall length of 377 feet (114.9 m), a beam of 36 feet 6 inches (11.13 m) and a draught of 11 feet 3 inches (3.43 m). The destroyers were powered by two Parsons geared steam turbines, each driving one propeller shaft using steam provided by three Admiralty three-drum boilers. The turbines developed a total of 44,000 shaft horsepower (33,000 kW) and gave a maximum speed of 36 knots (67 km/h; 41 mph). During her sea trials Ashanti made 37.4 knots (69.3 km/h; 43.0 mph) from 45,031 shp (33,580 kW) at a displacement of 2,020 long tons (2,050 t). The ships carried enough fuel oil to give them a range of 5,700 nautical miles (10,600 km; 6,600 mi) at 15 knots (28 km/h; 17 mph). The ships' complement consisted of 190 officers and ratings, although the flotilla leaders carried an extra 20 officers and men consisting of the Captain (D) and his staff.

The primary armament of the Tribal-class destroyers was eight quick-firing (QF) 4.7-inch (120 mm) Mark XII guns in four superfiring twin-gun mounts, one pair each fore and aft of the superstructure, designated 'A', 'B', 'X', and 'Y' from front to rear. The mounts had a maximum elevation of 40°. For anti-aircraft (AA) defence, they carried a single quadruple mount for the 40-millimetre (1.6 in) QF two-pounder Mk II "pom-pom" gun and two quadruple mounts for the 0.5-inch (12.7 mm) Mark III machine gun. Low-angle fire for the main guns was controlled by the director-control tower (DCT) on the bridge roof that fed data acquired by it and the 12-foot (3.7 m) rangefinder on the Mk II Rangefinder/Director directly aft of the DCT to an analogue mechanical computer, the Mk I Admiralty Fire Control Clock. Anti-aircraft fire for the main guns was controlled by the Rangefinder/Director which sent data to the mechanical Fuze Keeping Clock.

The ships were fitted with a single above-water quadruple mount for 21-inch (533 mm) torpedoes. The Tribals were not intended as anti-submarine ships, but they were provided with ASDIC, one depth charge rack and two throwers for self-defence, although the throwers were not mounted in all ships; Twenty depth charges was the peacetime allotment, but this increased to 30 during wartime.

=== Wartime modifications ===
Heavy losses to German air attack during the Norwegian Campaign demonstrated the ineffectiveness of the Tribals' anti-aircraft suite and the RN decided in May 1940 to replace 'X' mount with two QF 4-inch (102 mm) Mark XVI dual-purpose guns in a twin-gun mount. To better control the guns, the existing rangefinder/director was modified to accept a Type 285 gunnery radar as they became available. The number of depth charges was increased to 46 early in the war, and still more were added later. To increase the firing arcs of the AA guns, the rear funnel was shortened and the mainmast was reduced to a short pole mast.

== Construction and career ==
Authorized as one of nine Tribal-class destroyers under the 1936 Naval Estimates, Ashanti was the first ship of her name to serve in the Royal Navy. The ship was ordered on 19 June 1936 from William Denny and was laid down on 23 November at the company's Dumbarton shipyard. Launched on 5 November 1937, Ashanti was commissioned on 21 December 1938 at a cost of £340,770 which excluded weapons and communications outfits furnished by the Admiralty. The ship's completion was delayed by the late delivery of her gun mounts.

=== Pre-war ===
Although it was initially intended for all Tribal-class destroyers to visit the land of the people after whom they were named, Ashanti was one of the few to actually do this. She sailed to Takoradi, Gold Coast, on 27 February 1939. During the visit, the ship's company was presented with a silver bell and a gold shield by the Asantehene, the ceremonial leader of the Ashanti, then the Chief Osei Tutu Agyeman Prempeh II. The ship also accepted visitors from the tribe, many of whom presented good-luck charms and symbols of valour and survival to the ship.

In May 1939, the ship went to France on a good-will visit as part of the 6th Destroyer Flotilla, the Tribal-equipped flotilla of the Home Fleet. It was in preparation for the threat of war in Europe and for British seamen to make friends with their future allies of the French Navy. The following month, Ashanti, as part of the 6th Destroyer Flotilla, attempted to rescue the stricken submarine Thetis. Although the submarine was found still intact, salvage attempts failed and only four men were saved when the ship sank with the remaining 99 trapped within.

=== Second World War ===
On 3 September 1939, at the outbreak of the Second World War, Ashanti and the 6th Flotilla was escorting an Anglo-French squadron of battlecruisers, but Ashanti spent the rest of the month having damage to her turbine blades repaired. The 6th Flotilla combined operations with the Home Fleet with convoy escort duties, escorting Convoy HX 1, consisting of the troopships Aquitania, Empress of Britain , Empress of Australia, Duchess of Richmond and Monarch of Bermuda, carrying troops of the 1st Canadian Division to Britain. She was forced back to port in March 1940 after seawater leaked in and mixed with the boiler feedwater.

In April, after repairs were completed, she was deployed in the North Sea to support operations in Norway. She achieved little in this capacity, apart from being the target for numerous air attacks by German planes. One attack knocked out her main turbo-generator and the ship's power failed. She managed to zigzag her way out of the fjord and escape the attackers, and by June she was again in her role of escort and anti-submarine duties. On 10 August, she helped other naval vessels and trawlers rescue more than 300 survivors from the armed merchant cruiser HMS Transylvania which had been sunk earlier that day by the German submarine U-56 some 40 miles to the north of the Ulster coast.

When the new battleship King George V was completed, Ashanti formed part of her escort to Scapa Flow. The main threat was mines and Ashanti, together with four other destroyers, took the lead in a secret, suicidal attempt to detonate any mines that might be in the area. In the darkness, Fame ran aground while at high speed in a murky drizzle. Ashanti was right behind her and although only doing six knots, struck her, damaging fuel lines on both ships and then Fame caught fire. The Tribal-class destroyer Maori also ran aground, destroying her ASDIC dome. Feelings were running high on board as no-one knew the objective of the operation. Matters were compounded as the tide was receding and the destroyers were left beached waiting for high-tide. When high-tide came, the destroyers were swung round onto rocks and damaged even more; Ashanti was so badly damaged by the rocks, that Vickers-Armstrongs sent out a repair crew. It took two weeks to refloat Ashanti and move it to Newcastle for extensive repairs and hull stiffening. It was almost a year before the ship was ready for action again.

Her next major deployment was with other Tribal-class destroyers in Operation Archery in the Lofoten Islands in Norway in December 1941. They cleared out the Germans in Vågsøy and used the islands as a base from which they attacked German shipping. Shore targets were hit and small German boats were damaged but the operation was abandoned on 28 December after German air attacks on the island's harbour increased. After the raid, Hitler was convinced that the British were preparing an invasion of Norway, and diverted many precious resources there in preparation for an attack.

The Tribal-class vessels were still together and after escorting Arctic convoys to Murmansk, they were sent to be part of a huge relief effort to Malta. They were then sent back to the Arctic to escort more Russian convoys. She, along with the other Tribal-class destroyers, were later re-equipped for this role, with insulation around vital areas to prevent cold weather damage.

Ashanti was an escort for the Arctic convoy PQ 18 to the Soviet Union which was attacked by numerous U-boats and German aircraft. Forty-two Luftwaffe Heinkel He 111 torpedo bombers and thirty-five Junkers Ju 88 dive bombers simultaneously attacked the convoy, swamping the defenders. U-boats began shadowing the convoy and some were sunk; U-88 was sunk by the destroyer Faulknor, U-457 by Impulsive and U-589 by Onslow and aircraft from the escort carrier Avenger. Eight ships were sunk on 12 September, on 13 September, the Germans lost five Heinkels to Hurricane fighters. The tanker SS Atheltemplar was another casualty, being torpedoed on 14 September and abandoned. Later attacks were beaten off at the cost to the Germans of a further twenty aircraft shot down. Two more merchantmen were sunk by air attack in Murmansk harbour. In total, thirteen merchant ships were lost from the convoy.

The return convoy QP-14 was not spared German attack either, it came under attack by U-703. Ashanti and Somali worked together in hunting the U-boat, an operation which was hindered by lack of fuel. Somali, just after replacing Ashanti's position, was torpedoed by the submarine and severely damaged. Most of her crew were evacuated but of the eighty who stayed aboard to save the ship, most were lost when it eventually sank. Five other ships were sunk in the same day, four by U-435, including the minesweeper HMS Leda.

Her next deployment was for Operation Torch, in which she escorted capital ships in preparation for the invasion of North Africa. Once the invasion had started on 8 November, she was deployed to prevent any interference from Axis ships in the Mediterranean. She remained in the Mediterranean Sea until June 1943, when more problems with her feedwater tanks required a major re-fit in the Thames commercial shipyard in the United Kingdom.

After the re-fit, she operated from Scapa Flow escorting Arctic convoys through the long Arctic nights of late 1943. From 1944, she patrolled the English Channel in preparation for the Normandy Landings. In this capacity, she closely co-operated with the Canadian Tribal-class destroyers Haida and Huron. For the invasion, she patrolled the channel and guarded against German surface ships in the Southwest Approaches and the Bay of Biscay area. On 9 June, a German destroyer group was found off Brittany and engaged by Ashanti, Huron, Haida, as well as Eskimo, Javelin, and the Polish destroyers Piorun and Błyskawica in the Battle of Ushant. The Kriegsmarine ship Z32 was driven ashore and wrecked, Z24 was severely damaged and ZH1, the ex-Dutch destroyer Gerard Callenburgh, was sunk. Her last action in the war was prevention of the evacuation of German personnel from France. On 5 August 1944, she engaged a German convoy off the Île d'Yeu and sank two escort minesweepers and a Patrol Vessel. Haida was damaged in the engagement. Ashanti was then taken in for an extensive and expensive re-fit and played no further part in the fighting. Other Royal Navy Tribal-class destroyers were sent to Asia to fight against the Empire of Japan.

== Fate ==
Ashanti had survived North Atlantic gales, technical trouble, the Norwegian Campaign, running aground, Arctic convoys, the invasion of North Africa, U-boat attacks, aircraft attacks, and some of the toughest destroyer fighting of the Second World War. Yet by the end of the war it was clear that she had out-lived her usefulness. She was paid-off and went into reserve after VJ Day. In 1947, she was put on the disposal list and used for ship target trials. On 12 April 1948 she arrived at West of Scotland Shipbreakers for demolition.
