= HMS Triumph (R16) =

1946 Colossus-class aircraft carrier of the Royal Navy

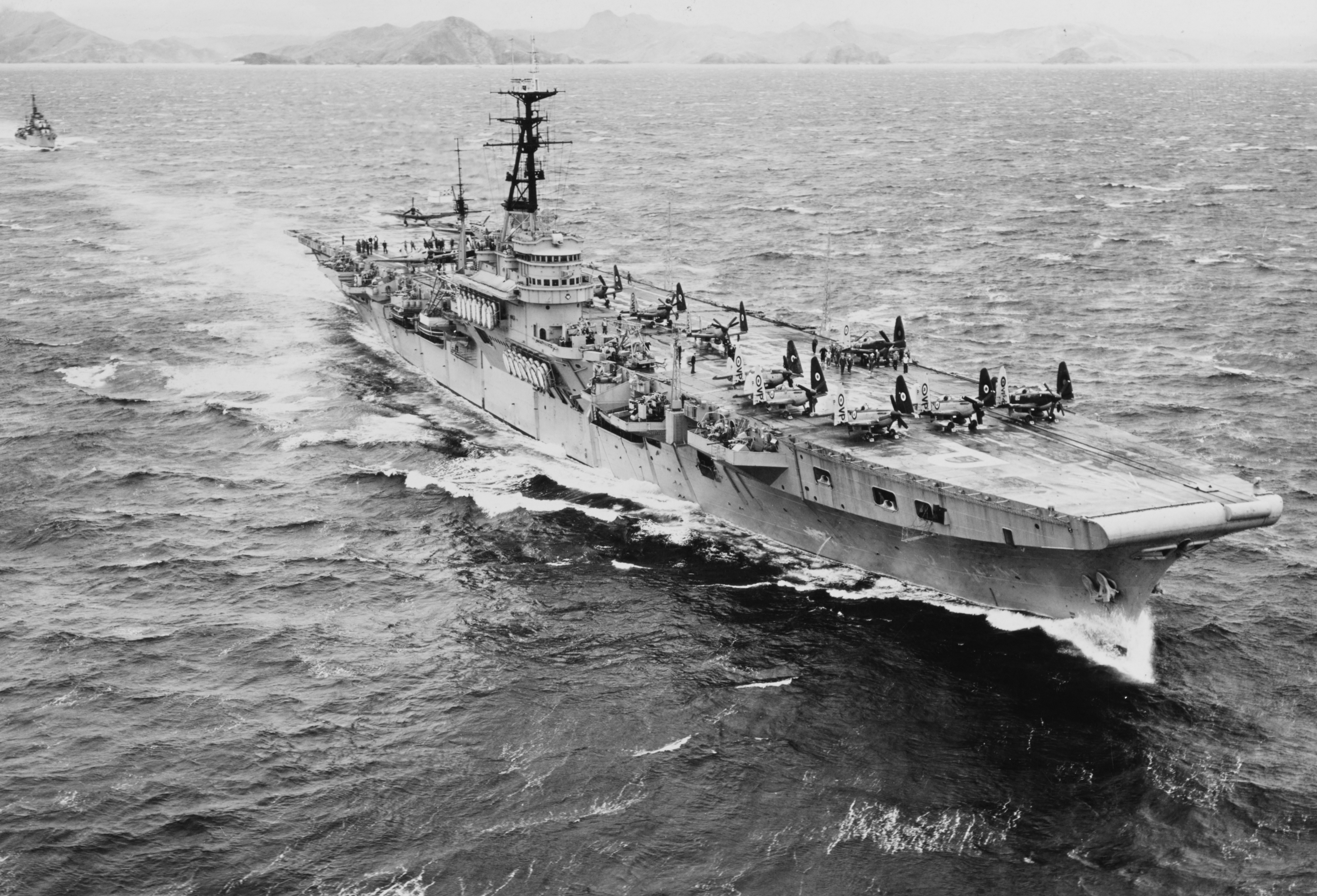
- HMS Triumph at sea, March 1950

History

United Kingdom
- Laid down: 27 January 1943
- Launched: 2 November 1944
- Commissioned: 6 May 1946
- Stricken: 1981
- Fate: Scrapped in Spain 1981

General characteristics
- Class & type: Colossus-class aircraft carrier
- Displacement: 13,350 tons standard
- Length: 695 ft (212 m)
- Beam: 80 ft (24 m)
- Draught: 23.5 ft (7.2 m)
- Propulsion: 2 shafts, Parsons geared Steam turbines.; 4 × Admiralty 3-drum boilers; 40,000 shp
- Speed: 25 knots (46 km/h)
- Range: 12,000 nautical miles (22,000 km)
- Complement: 1,300 (including air group)
- Aircraft carried: 48

HMS Triumph was a Royal Navy Colossus-class light fleet aircraft carrier. She served in the Korean War and later, after reconstruction, as a support ship.

== Construction and design ==
The Colossus class was a class of relatively small aircraft carriers which were designed to be built quickly to meet the Royal Navy's requirements for more carriers to allow it to fight a global war. In order to allow speedy build, they were designed to mercantile rather than navy hull standards, while armour protection and long-range anti-aircraft guns were not fitted. Sixteen ships were ordered by the end of 1942, but the last six were completed to a modified design as the Majestic-class.

Triumph was 695 feet 0 inches (211.84 m) long overall, 650 feet (198.12 m) at the waterline and 630 feet (192.02 m) between perpendiculars. Beam was 80 feet (24.38 m) and draught was 23 feet 6 inches (7.16 m) at deep load. Displacement was 13,190 long tons (13,400 t) standard and 18,040 long tons (18,330 t) deep load. Four Admiralty 3-drum boilers supplied steam to two sets of Parsons geared steam turbines which in turn drove two propeller shafts. The machinery was rated at 40,000 shaft horsepower (30,000 kW), giving a speed of 25 knots (29 mph; 46 km/h). The ships had a range of 12,000 nautical miles (14,000 mi; 22,000 km) at a speed of 14 knots (16 mph; 26 km/h).

The flight deck was 690 feet (210.3 m) long and 80 feet (24.4 m) wide, while the hangar was 275 feet (83.8 m) long (with a 57 feet (17.4 m) extension aft of the rear lift), 52 feet (15.8 m) wide with a clear overhead height of 17 feet 6 inches (5.33 m). Two aircraft lifts (each 45 by 34 feet (14 m × 10 m) and with a capacity of 15,000 lb (6,800 kg) carried aircraft between the hangar and flight deck. A single BH3 catapult capable of propelling a 16,000-pound (7,300 kg) aircraft to a speed of 66 knots (76 mph; 122 km/h) was fitted. 42 aircraft could be carried. Triumph was fitted with a close-in anti-aircraft armament of six quadruple 2-pounder (40 mm) pom-pom autocannon and nineteen single Bofors 40-mm guns. Four 3-pounder (47 mm) saluting guns were also fitted.

Triumph was laid down during World War II on 27 January 1943 at Hawthorn Leslie and Company on the Tyne as Yard number 662. The relatively simple design meant that construction was relatively rapid and Triumph was launched by Lady Mountbatten on 2 October 1944. The ship was commissioned on 9 May 1946, as the ninth ship of that name to serve with the Royal Navy.

== Service ==
On commissioning, Triumph joined the Home Fleet, serving as trials and training carrier, without a dedicated air group. On 26 July 1946, Triumph, accompanied by the destroyer Rapid, visited the Soviet port of Kronstadt, near Leningrad, taking part in the Navy Day celebrations. On 14 August 1946, the Thames barge Beaumont Belle collided with Triumph at Sheerness. Beaumont Belle lost her mainmast but the carrier was undamaged. Triumph was refitted at Portsmouth from September to December 1946, and on 14 January 1947, the Fairey Fireflys of 827 Naval Air Squadron embarked, with the carrier leaving for Gibraltar the next day, arriving there on 18 January. At the end of January, Triumph left Gibraltar for the UK, carrying a suspected German war criminal. The carrier arrived at Glasgow on 5 February, disembarking her passenger, and embarking the Supermarine Seafires of 800 Naval Air Squadron. She left for the Mediterranean on 10 February, arriving at Malta on 16 February and joining the Mediterranean Fleet. In June–July 1948, Triumph was deployed off the coast of Israel to cover the withdrawal of British forces. On 23 March 1949, Triumph left Malta to return to Britain. She was paid off at Sheerness on 5 April 1949, but recommissioned with a new captain and ship's crew on 21 April.

After recommissioning, Triumph was selected to serve with the Far East Fleet. The carrier worked up her air group in the Mediterranean, and left Malta for the Far East on 4 August 1949, arriving at Hong Kong on 3 September. From 3 October to 1 November, Triumph underwent maintenance at Singapore, while her air group, carried out air strikes against Communist insurgents of the Malayan National Liberation Army from RNAS Sembawang, Singapore. On 10 April 1950, Triumph left Hong Kong for a summer cruise off Japan.

=== Korean War service ===
On 24 June 1950, Triumph left Ōminato in Japan to return to Hong Kong at the end of her cruise around Japan. The next day, Triumph was steaming south-west in the Sea of Japan towards the Tsushima Strait when news reached Triumph and her accompanying ships of war breaking out in the Korean peninsula. This forced Triumph into a state of alert, including fully armed aircraft on deck. Triumph, escorted by the destroyer Cossack, who would also act as an escort to Triumph's sister ship Theseus, was refuelled and re-provisioned at the Royal Australian Naval base at Kure, Japan. The C-class destroyer Consort and the cruiser Jamaica, who would both have prominent roles during the Korean War, as well as the Australian River-class frigate Shoalhaven, and the Royal Fleet Auxiliary tanker Wave Conqueror, joined Triumph as she left the base.

The following day, she and her escorts, headed for Okinawa, refuelling at the American base there. Then they proceeded to western Korean waters, where other Royal Navy warships were converging. At this time, she was the sole British carrier in the Far East. She was thus destined to have a vital role in the early months of the Korean War. After joining the US Fleet, 827 Naval Air Squadron, part of Triumph's air group, commenced operations with a number of Fireflies in the strike role, with 800 Naval Air Squadron providing fighter cover and secondary strike capability with their Seafires, a naval variant of the Spitfire.

The Seafires and Fireflies of Triumph, in conjunction with aircraft from the American carrier Valley Forge, hit airfields at Pyongyang and Haeju on 3 July, the first carrier strikes of the war, with Triumph launching twelve Fireflies and nine Seafires, all armed with rockets, against Heaju. The Seafires, though agile and fast, had an appearance that was a liability when operating with allied forces. The aircraft had a remarkable similarity to the Yak-9, a Second World War Soviet fighter aircraft, in service with the North Korean forces. Such similarities would play to an almost tragic incident further into Triumph's deployment during the Korean War.

On 19 July 1950, Lieutenant P. Cane, flying a Sea Otter, an air-sea rescue aircraft, performed the last operational sea rescue of that type, when a F4U Corsair had been shot down by anti-aircraft fire, forcing the American pilot to ditch into very rough seas. The Sea Otter landed despite the adverse conditions and the American pilot was soon rescued. The Sea Otter returned to Triumph successfully, thanks mainly to the skill of the pilot, who was awarded the US Air Medal as a result.

On 28 July, an almost tragic event occurred, when a flight of Seafires were deployed to an area to investigate possible enemy air activity. They discovered that the activity was a flight of American B-29 bombers. One of the Seafires was hit by one of the bombers in its fuel tank forcing the pilot to bail out and land in terrible sea conditions. Rescue by Sea Otter was impossible due to the appalling conditions. The pilot was forced to wait about an hour until he was rescued by the American destroyer Eversole.

Further combat air patrol (CAP) and anti-submarine operations continued until she left Korean waters for Kure in Japan, where she spent her eight days there in refit. On 9 July, Triumph was back on the west coast of Korea, accompanied by the cruiser Kenya, the destroyer Comus and two Canadian warships, Athabaskan and Sioux. Seafires launched numerous photographic reconnaissance operations around areas such as Mokpo, Kunsan, Chinnam, as well as Incheon. Over the next few days, Seafires destroyed two North Korean gunboats, attacked railway tracks, small coaster vessels and oil tanks.

On 23 August, Triumph, with just nine operational aircraft left, returned to Sasebo, Japan, where she joined two other carriers, Valley Forge and Philippine Sea. While in harbour the North Koreans launched an unexpected air attack, hitting Comus, causing damage to her hull and killing one sailor in the process. She was escorted to Kure for repair by her sister ship Consort. This caused the carriers to be extra vigilant in the aftermath of the attack, with an increase in CAP operations.

On 29 August, another incident occurred, when a Fairey Firefly landed without an arrestor hook and was stopped by the safety barrier. A large piece of propeller blade broke off, hurtled towards the surface of the flying control position, breaking the glass of the operations room and entering the compartment with tragic consequences, striking Lieutenant Commander I. M. McLachlan, the commanding officer of 800 Naval Air Squadron, who later died from the injuries sustained in this freak incident. He was buried at sea off the coast of South Korea with full naval honours.

On 30 August, after a four-day patrol, Triumph returned to Sasebo, where she received 14 aircraft from the support carrier Unicorn. On 3 September, Triumph departed Sasebo for the West Coast of Korea. When she got there, her aircraft performed the now routine CAP missions along with reconnaissance duties and bombardment spotting for the Fiji-class cruiser Jamaica and the destroyer Charity.

After 6 September, Triumph, accompanied by Athabaskan, Warramunga and Bataan, proceeded to the east coast of Korea to replace the carriers of the US 7th Fleet. Operations commenced on the 8th, with Fireflies and Seafires attacking numerous targets, causing much havoc for the North Korean forces.

On the 9th, bad weather forced operations to limit themselves to just eight sorties, with four Fireflies attacking the airfield at Koryo, causing a large amount of damage. 800 NAS's aircraft was decreased yet again, now to just six aircraft, after four others had been written off. The following day, Triumph returned once again to Sasebo.

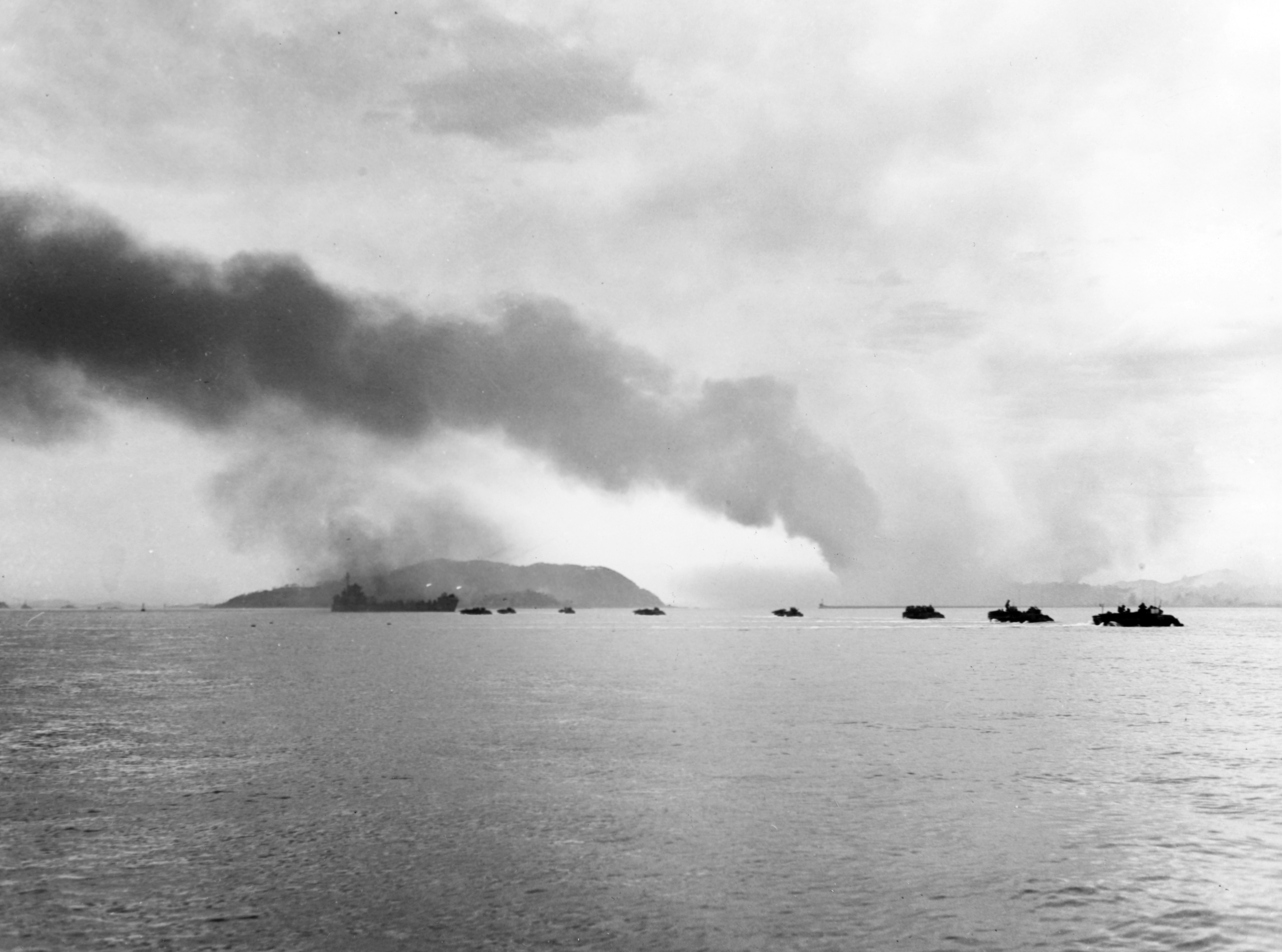
Battle of Inchon, 1950

On 12 September, Triumph departed Sasebo, accompanied by Warramunga and the Royal Navy C-class destroyers - Charity, Cockade and Concord. Their objective, though unknown to the crews of the ships at that time, was to cover the landings at Incheon. The group, part of CTF 91, a Commonwealth Task Force, was joined by the cruiser Ceylon and RAN warship, Bataan, and was now known as the Northern Group. There was also a much smaller Southern Group which comprised the Canadian ships Athabaskan, Cayuga and Sioux.

Triumph's aircraft provided vital air cover for the attacking forces in the first few days before the landings. After the landings took place, Triumph and her accompanying escort, provided anti-submarine patrols, while her aircraft commenced interdiction and spotting operations. The latter operations proved very successful, with Fireflies spotting for the cruisers Jamaica and Kenya. Thanks to the spotting by the Fireflies, Jamaica launched a devastating bombardment on North Korean positions, destroying a hidden cache of weapons, which resulted in the top of a hill being obliterated, creating a large plume of smoke that reached 8,000 feet.

The end of the day's operations led to a message to the commander of the Commonwealth naval forces, Admiral Andrewes, from the United Nations' overall commander, General Douglas MacArthur, "My heartiest felicitations on the splendid conduct of the Fleet units under your command. They have added another glamorous page to the long and brilliant histories of the Navies of the British Commonwealth."

By the end of D-Day an astonishing 13,000 troops and all their equipment had been landed. On 17 September, North Korean aircraft bombed the American warship Rochester, as well as strafing the British cruiser Jamaica, killing one and wounding two. Shortly afterwards, both warships managed to carry out a brief bombardment of North Korean troops.

On 21 September, Triumph entered Sasebo for the last time in her deployment during the Korean War. She spent two days there in dry dock for temporary repairs, before departing for Hong Kong on 25 September, her role in the conflict being replaced by Theseus.

=== Remainder of service ===
After her Korean service Triumph was selected as the replacement for HMS Devonshire as a cadet training ship. She carried two terms each of 100 RN and Commonwealth cadets on three cruises each year, in the Spring to the West Indies, in the summer to Scandinavia and around the UK, and in the autumn to the Mediterranean. She carried three Sea Balliol aircraft with which to inculcate air-mindedness in the cadets.

In 1952, Triumph was used for the first trials of an angled flight deck. Her original deck markings were obliterated and replaced with new ones at an angle to the long axis of the ship. The success of these trials led to the development of the now-standard design, with additional areas of the flight deck added to the port side of the ship.

In 1954 she was diverted to ferry survivors of the troopship Empire Windrush from North Africa to Gibraltar for repatriation. In 1955 she replaced HMS Albion on a 'goodwill' visit to Leningrad. This terminated in her captain, Varyl Begg, carrying out a sternboard down the Neva against a beam gale after her hastily laid Soviet sternbuoy had dragged. Her cadet training duties ended with the autumn cruise of 1955, when changes in the system of training RN officers rendered her redundant. Shortly before arriving home to Devonport, Triumph executed the last axial-deck landing in the RN.

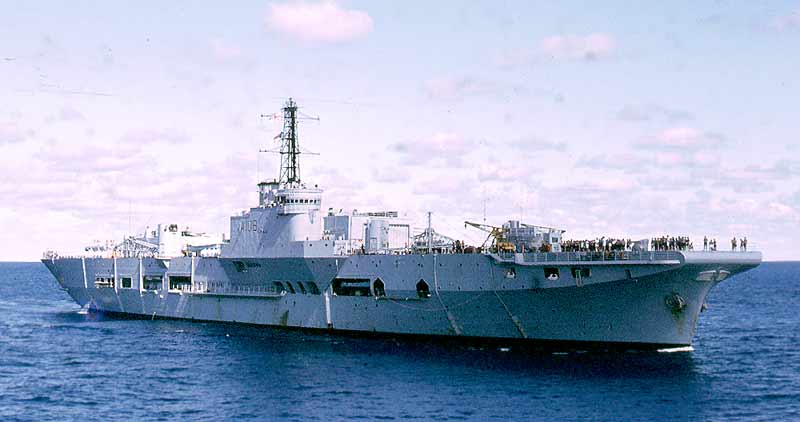
HMS Triumph as a heavy repair ship.

Triumph was then converted, between 1956 and 1965, into a heavy repair ship, emerging from the work with the pennant number "A108". Triumph was based in Singapore after her conversion, being involved in a major exercise in 1968 in the Solomon Sea (Exercise Coral Sands?), with numerous capital ships from the United Kingdom and other nations taking part, as well as dozens of destroyers and frigates. Triumph was used as a heavy repair and transport ship for troops. In 1975 she was placed in reserve at Chatham Dockyard. In 1981 she was struck and sold for scrapping in Spain that December. The Ministry of Defence did enquire into the possibility of buying her back following the Falklands Crisis in April 1982 but dismantling was already too far advanced.
