= Canada in the Korean War =

Aspect of Canadian military history from 1950 to 1953

The Canadian Forces were involved in the 1950–1953 Korean War and its aftermath. 26,791 Canadians participated on the side of the United Nations (the third highest total of any non-Korean country, behind the United Kingdom who brought 56,000 men and the United States who brought 1,789,000 men), and Canada sent eight destroyers. Canadian aircraft provided transport, supply and logistics. 516 Canadians died, 312 of which were from combat. After the war, 7,000 Canadian troops remained until 1957 as military observers.

== Background ==
Japan's defeat in World War II brought an end to 35 years of Japanese colonial rule of the Korean Peninsula. The surrender of Japan to the Allied forces on 2 September 1945 led to the peninsula being divided into North and South Koreas, with the North occupied by troops from the Soviet Union, and the South, below the 38th parallel, occupied by troops from the United States.

The Soviet forces entered the Korean Peninsula on 10 August 1945, followed a few weeks later by the American forces who entered through Incheon. U.S. Army Lieutenant-General John R. Hodge formally accepted the surrender of Japanese forces south of the 38th Parallel on 9 September 1945 at the Government House in Seoul.

Although both rival factions tried initially to diplomatically reunite the divided nation, the Northern faction eventually tried to do so with military force. The North hoped that they would be able to unify the peninsula via insurgency, but the success of South Korea (Republic of Korea: ROK) in suppressing insurgency brought about the realization for the North that they would require military force. North Korea (Democratic People's Republic of Korea: DPRK) had expanded their army and Korean volunteers fighting in Manchuria in the Chinese Civil War had given their troops battle experience. The North expected to win with the war in a matter of days. Troops from North's Korean People's Army (KPA) crossed the 38th parallel on 25 June 1950 beginning a civil war.

The invasion of South Korea came as a surprise to the United Nations. The day the war began, the United Nations immediately drafted UNSC Resolution 82, which called for:

1. all hostilities to end and North Korea to withdraw to the 38th Parallel;
2. a UN Commission on Korea to be formed to monitor the situation and report to the Security Council;
3. all UN members to support the United Nations in achieving this, and refrain from providing assistance to the North Korean authorities.

When the KPA crossed into South Korea on 25 June 1950, they advanced for the capital Seoul, which fell in less than a week.

North Korea's forces continued toward the port of Pusan, a strategic goal and the seat of the ROK government. The Korean People's Army conquered all of Korea except for this tiny enclave at the end of the peninsula. The war was nearly won by the DPRK. In two days, the United States offered assistance and the United Nations Security Council asked its members to help repel the North Korean attack. Canada, the United States, Australia, United Kingdom, New Zealand, South Africa, India, the Philippines, Ethiopia, France, and other countries sent troops to Korea under a United Nations security council resolution.

== Canadian Army involvement ==
=== Special Force ===
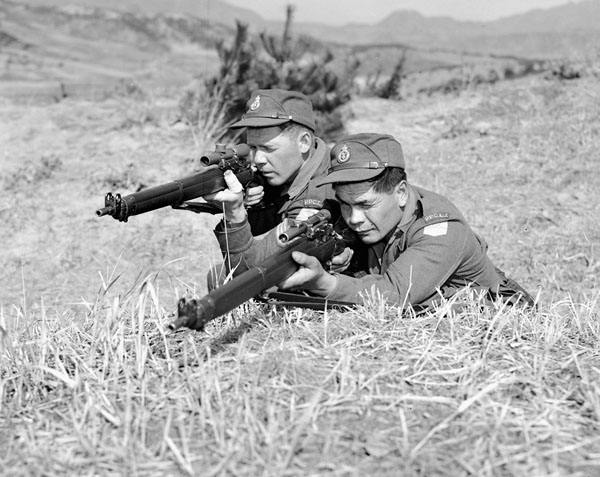
Two snipers of Princess Patricia's Canadian Light Infantry in Korea

Lieutenant-General Charles Foulkes, then Chief of the General Staff was in favour of Canada providing an infantry brigade for the 1st Commonwealth Division. Since Foulkes favoured keeping the Canadian Army's Mobile Striking Force intact for the defence of North America, he recommended recruiting a separate Special Force for the Korean War.

Recruits for the Special Force were enlisted for a period of eighteen months with recruits coming from both the Active Force, World War II veterans and adventure seeking young men. The normal recruitment standards were lowered since "the army would not wish to retain the 'soldier of fortune' type of personnel on a long term basis'". Units of the Special Force would be second battalions of the existing three Permanent Force regiments.

On 15 August 1950, the 2nd Battalion was created within Princess Patricia's Canadian Light Infantry (PPCLI) as a component of the Canadian Army Special Force in response to the North Korean invasion of South Korea. The new battalion trained in Calgary and at CFB Wainwright, before boarding USNS Private Joe P. Martinez on 25 November 1950, to Pusan in South Korea. The battalion landed in Korea in December and trained in the mountains for eight weeks before finally taking part in the war on 6 February, becoming a component of the 27th British Commonwealth Brigade of the IX Corps in the 8th US Army. The 2nd Battalion of the PPCLI was the first Canadian infantry unit to take part in the Korean War.

Special Force Second Battalions of the Royal Canadian Regiment and Royal 22nd Regiment were formed and sent to Korea in 1951.

By spring 1951, 8,500 Canadians troops were supporting the United Nations, alongside 12,500 British, 5,000 Filipino troops and 5,000 Turkish troops.

=== Area of operations ===
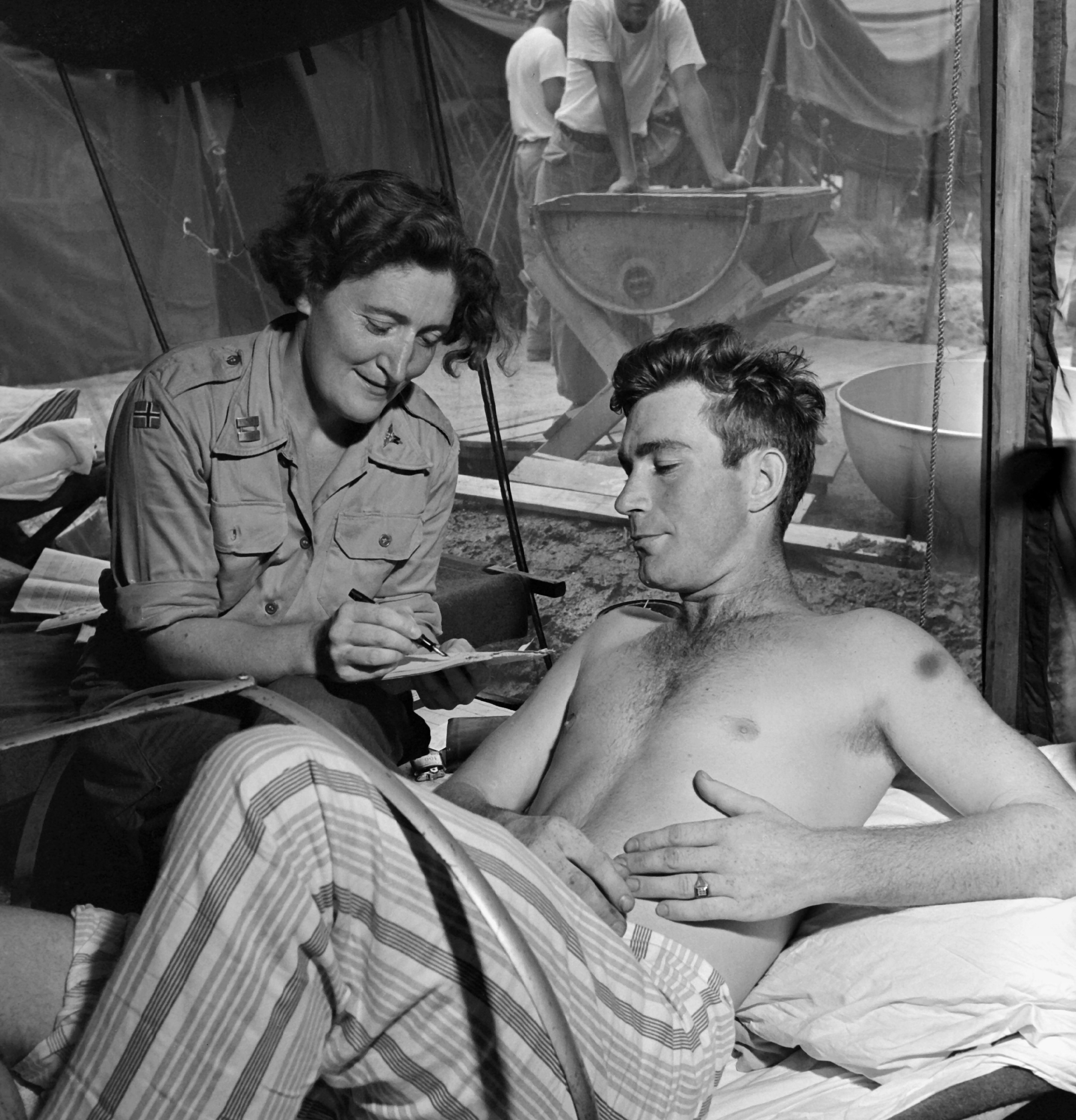
A lance corporal of the Canadian Army being tended to in the Norwegian Army Surgical Hospital, January 1951

From the summer of 1951 to the end of the war, most of the Canadian involvement centered on a small area north of Seoul "between the 38th parallel on the south and the town of Chorwon on the north, and from the Sami-Chon River east to Chail-li". The Canadian war front was about 48 kilometres (30 mi) across and was a section of the United Nations front occupied by British Commonwealth forces. Most of the Canadians' combat missions took place within that zone. The Canadians' two main adversaries during the war were the Korean People's Army and the Chinese People's Volunteer Army in the Battle of Kapyong. Canada's military objective was to give military support towards the resolution of the war on the central front, which was central Korea.

=== Operation Killer ===
Operation Killer was a counter-offensive by the United Nations forces to push Communist Chinese and North Korean armies back behind the Han River and recover the South Korean capital. The operation began on 21 February 1951. The 900 Canadians of the 2PPCLI set off to the front on 15 February, 240 km (150 mi) away. It was cold and men sat in trucks for 48 hours before arriving. They suffered frostbite and numbed limbs, and the lubricants on their weapons froze during the journey.

The Canadians arrived 17 February at 3:00pm. Their goal was to advance toward Hill 404. On their way, they were flanked on both sides but managed to continue up to the hill to have the high ground on the enemy for Operation Killer. On 21 February, the Patricias left the small village of Sangsok and headed north to their assigned objective of a new hill called Hill 419. This hill was defended by the Chinese. The Patricias D Company led by Captain J. G. Turnbull were to attack but the ridge of the hill gave an easy line of sight for the Chinese. The Canadians took fire from every direction from cannons, rockets and small arms fire. They were under intense fire. Their attack was postponed for 36 hours but they kept up aggressive patrols and eventually the Australians gained control of Hill 619. The Australians taking Hill 619 made the Chinese leave Hill 419 and the Canadians took the hill without serious opposition. From 21 to 28 February, the Patricias suffered 10 killed and more than 21 wounded. The operation ended on 6 March 1951.

The Canadians learned a strong lesson about the People's Volunteer Army during this Operation. They were told by British intelligence that there "was nothing surprising about the enemy: the concealment, mobility, poor marksmanship and stamina". The Canadians learned during the operation that the Chinese were very good at concealing automatic weapons along approach lines. Finally, the operation was successful in the objective that it had set with the United Nations forces.

=== Battle of Kapyong ===
In April 1951, Chinese forces of the 118th Division and the 60th Division attacked the Kapyong Valley in force, and pushed South Korean and New Zealand troops into retreat. Under heavy pressure, the Korean 6th Division broke, and the line collapsed. American and South Korean men poured through a gap under protective covering fire from Australians who were holding their section of the line despite heavy pressure.

The 3rd Battalion, Royal Australian Regiment (3 RAR) and 2nd Battalion, Princess Patricia's Canadian Light Infantry (2 PPCLI) were ordered to halt this Chinese advance. The mission of the men of the 27th Commonwealth Brigade was to block the two approaches to Kapyong. In only a few hours, they managed to prepare defensive positions.

On 22 April 1951 the Chinese advanced towards Kapyong Valley defeating the ROK positions in their way. The 2 PPCLI became aware of the Chinese advance from two regiments of the 6th ROK who were retreating past their positions. As one Canadian recalled it, "[W]e looked out and all we could see were South Korean troops flying past us along with all these monstrous American Vehicles they were supplied with". With this overwhelming alarm, the Canadians started digging trenches and positioning themselves on Hill 677. They also put positions on the mile-long ridge that was connected to it. Hill 677 for the Canadians was positioned on the west side of the Kapyong River. On Hill 504, dug in were the 3 RAR which was on the other side of Hill 677 and who were also ready for the Chinese attack.

The Chinese 118th Division engaged their two forward battalions on 23 April. In the early part of the battle the 1st Battalion of the Middlesex Regiment and the 16th Field Regiment of the Royal New Zealand Artillery were all but cut off. The resistance of forward positions, held by the 2 PPCLI and 3 RAR, permitted the Middlesexes to withdraw. It moved into place to provide a reserve.

The initial Chinese attack at Kapyong engaged 3 RAR on Hill 504. The Chinese then struck at the Canadian front. Waves of massed Chinese troops kept up the attack throughout the night of 23 April. After a night of fierce fighting Major Bernard O'Dowd, Officer Commanding, A Company, 3 RAR, managed to get through on a radio phone to a general of the 1st U.S. Marine Division. The general was incredulous, thinking it was an enemy agent speaking. He told O'Dowd that the unit no longer existed, that it had been wiped out the night before.

The Chinese had managed to infiltrate the brigade position by the morning of 23 April. The Australians and Canadians were facing the whole of the Chinese 118th Division and 60th Division, a force of about 20,000 men, while the 3 RAR and 2 PPCLI each had about 700 men. Throughout 24 April the battle was unrelenting. It devolved on both fronts into hand-to-hand combat with bayonet charges. The Australians, facing encirclement, were ordered to make an orderly fall back to reserve positions late in the day of 24 April and did not engage the enemy further.

2 PPCLI was completely surrounded and outnumbered by about 30 to 1. During the course of the fighting, 2 PPCLI was completely exhausted of ammunition, medical supplies, and food, and forced to defend their positions with bayonets. Captain Mills, in command of D Company, was forced to call down artillery fire on his own positions on Hill 677 several times during the early morning hours of 25 April to avoid being overrun. It had to be resupplied by air drops during this time. By dawn the Chinese attack on the Canadian position had abated, and in the afternoon of 25 April the road through to the Canadians had been cleared of Chinese, and following a Canadian offensive to clear Hill 677 on 26 April, the 2nd Battalion was relieved.

The 16th Field Regiment, Royal New Zealand Artillery, also managed to withdraw and link up with the U.S. Army's 72nd Heavy Tank Battalion. These units provided close heavy gun support during the early stages of the battle, and the RNZA provided long distance support for the 2 PPCLI during the mass attacks on the night of 25 April, targeting the overrun Canadian positions from a distance of about 7.2 kilometres (4.5 mi) away.

Canada lost 12 soldiers killed (out of allied losses of 59) and 35 wounded at this battle.

=== Patrols and skirmishes ===
On 25 May 1951, the 2nd Battalion PPCLI was transferred to the 25th Canadian Infantry Brigade within the 1st Commonwealth Division. For the rest of the war, the various infantry battalions of the PPCLI, the Royal 22nd Regiment, and the Royal Canadian Regiment, tank squadrons of Lord Strathcona's Horse, regiments of the Royal Canadian Horse Artillery, and various units of the Royal Canadian Army Medical Corps rotated in and out of the war.

== Royal Canadian Navy in Korea ==
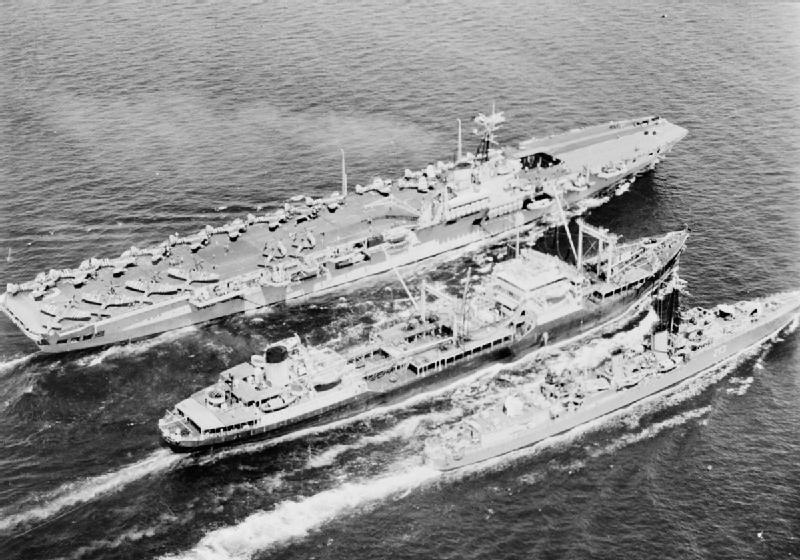
RFA Wave Sovereign resupplying HMCS Nootka (right foreground) and HMS Ocean (left background) off Korea in 1952.

Three Royal Canadian Navy (RCN) destroyers were dispatched as Canada's initial response to the United Nations' call for assistance during the Korean War, and were sent to Korean waters to join other UN naval forces. The eight Canadian ships' duties included shore bombardments and the destruction of North Korean trains and railway lines. Initially dispatched in 1950, Canadian destroyers maintained a presence off the Korean peninsula until 1955.

The ships were first under fire during the bombardment of Inchon in the middle of January 1951. The coastal defence fire was inaccurate, and the ships doubled back and silenced the guns. Another bombardment at Inchon two days later was also successful, without damage. The only Canadian naval casualties of the Korean War occurred on 2 October 1952 during an inshore patrol by Iroquois on the east coast, inflicted by a coastal defence battery: 3 sailors died and 10 were wounded. Canadian ships destroyed 8 of the 28 trains destroyed by United Nations forces, and Crusader alone hit 3 trains.

The first dispatch was HMCS Cayuga, Athabaskan and Sioux, which were followed by HMCS Nootka, Iroquois, Huron, Haida and Crusader. 3621 Canadian sailors participated. HMCS Sioux was the last RCN ship to depart Korean waters, in September 1955. One RCN aviator flew with the U.S. Navy.

== Royal Canadian Air Force in Korea ==
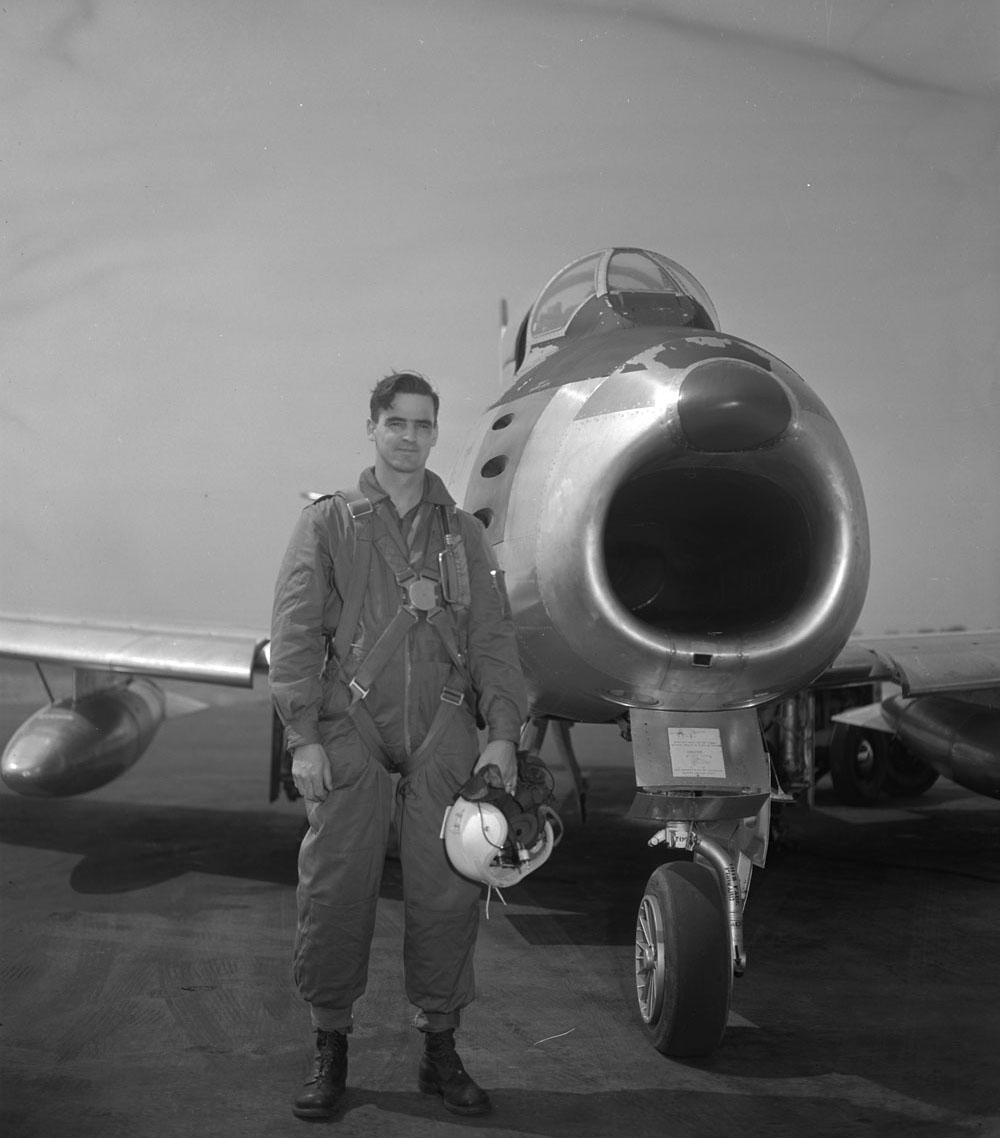
Flight Lieutenant Ernie Glover of the Royal Canadian Air Force in front of the F-86 Sabre he flew while attached with the United States Air Force during the Korean War.

In 1950, the Royal Canadian Air Force (RCAF) was heavily involved with the transportation of personnel and supplies in support of the Korean War. No. 426 Transport Squadron was attached to the Military Air Transport Service. During Canada's involvement in the Korean War, 600 trans-Pacific flights were flown in Canadair North Stars, carrying 3,000 tons of cargo and 13,000 passengers. The squadron suffered no losses.

The RCAF was not involved with a combat role since no jet fighter squadrons capable of the type of combat required in Korea were yet in service, and capable fighter squadrons that later did become operational were allocated to NATO duty in Europe. Twenty-two RCAF fighter pilots, however, flew the North American F-86 Sabre on exchange duty with the United States Air Force (USAF) in Korea so that they could gain combat experience. Between them, these pilots were credited with nine Mikoyan-Gurevich MiG-15s destroyed, two probable kills, and ten damaged in the course of 1036 sorties. They were awarded seven Distinguished Flying Crosses, one Commonwealth Distinguished Flying Cross, and four Air Medals. One was shot down and captured due to friendly fire. One Canadian famously known for being awarded the Distinguished Flying Cross was Ernie Glover. He was also a World War II veteran who flew Hurricane fighter planes. He was known for shooting down three enemy planes in less than two days and contributing a major effort to the South Korean air support throughout the war. During the war, the United Nations had air dominance, giving them an advantage in air to ground offences.

When the USAF experienced a shortage of F-86s, Canada supplied sixty Canadair Sabres.

== Cessation of hostilities ==
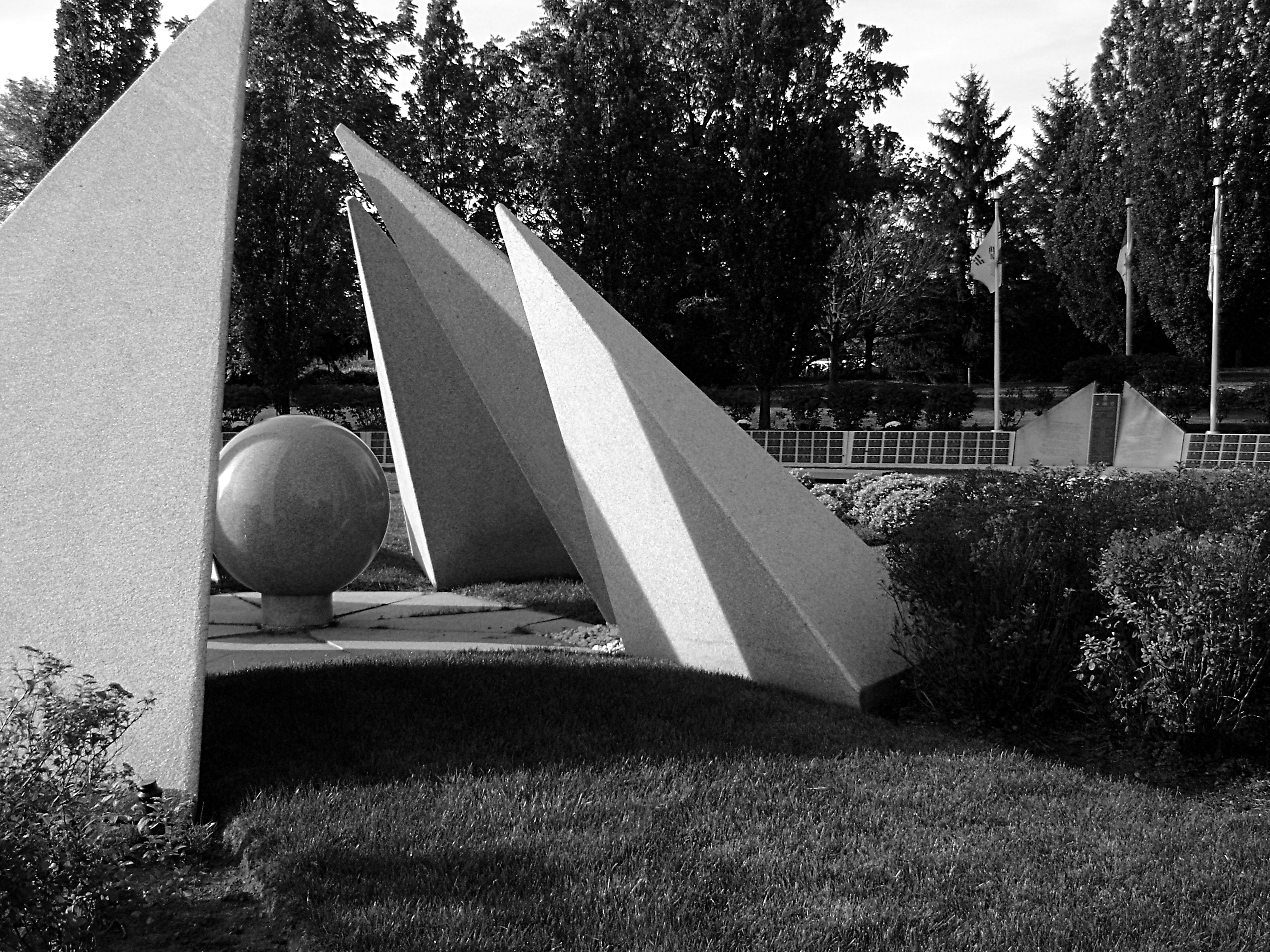
Korean War Memorial Wall

On 29 November 1952, U.S. President-elect Dwight D. Eisenhower fulfilled a campaign promise by going to Korea to find out what could be done to end the conflict. With the UN's acceptance of India's proposal for a Korean armistice, a cease-fire was established on 27 July 1953, by which time the front line was back around the 38th parallel, and so a demilitarised zone (DMZ) was established around it, defended by North Korean troops on one side and by South Korean, American and UN troops on the other. The DMZ runs north of the parallel towards the east, and to the south as it travels west. The site of the peace talks, Kaesong, the old capital of Korea, was part of the South before hostilities broke out but is currently a special city of the North. North Korea and the United States signed the Armistice Agreement, which Syngman Rhee refused to sign.

After the war ended, Canadians remained in Korea for three years as military observers.

Altogether, more than 26,000 Canadians served in the Korean conflict from 1950 to 1953 — and another 7,000 Canadians served in the Korean theatre between the cease-fire of 1953 and the end of 1955. 516 died, due to enemy action, illness or accident. The United Nations Memorial Cemetery in Busan, South Korea has the remains of 378 Canadians who died during the war.

== War crimes ==
Canadian forces committed a small number of atrocities during the Korean War. Several soldiers were convicted by Canadian military courts for murder, rape, manslaughter, robbery, and attempted murder. However, upon their return to Canada, many of those convicted were released from prison within a year or two. Historian Chris Madsen concluded that, "Once the immediate need of providing a deterrent for other soldiers contemplating such behaviour was fulfilled and the general public lost interest, the Department of National Defence quietly returned the disgraced soldiers back to civilian life as quickly as possible." Brent Byron Watson found that Canadian military commanders exercised correct military discipline and acted quickly to punish their men for atrocities. However, the Canadian government would regularly release the perpetrators upon their return to Canada, where they were supposed to serve out their sentences.

Suffice it to say that very few men who were actually found guilty of these crimes served their full sentences after being returned to Canada; in fact, most were released within a year or two. This travesty of justice was yet another example of the institutional racism that seems to have permeated the upper echelons of the Department of National Defence. Yet the failure of Canadian military justice at the highest levels can hardly be blamed on Canadian field commanders. The evidence clearly indicates that they immediately took the appropriate disciplinary action in cases involving serious criminal offences, whether perpetrated against civilians or fellow soldiers.

== The Forgotten War ==
Many scholars have referred to the Korean War by its western nickname, the “Forgotten War” due to overall lack of political, martial, and societal attention towards it.

=== Political indifference ===
From the beginning, the Korean War was one the Canadian government wanted to remain uninvolved with. Because of major disarmament, a significantly reduced military defence budget, and Canadian citizens’ dissatisfaction with conscription during World War I and World War II, the St. Laurent Cabinet that held office during the 1950s was cautious to participate in the Korean War and insisted on minimal contributions. It was not until increasing pressures from the Canadian press, the United States, and the United Nations, that the government first conceded to provide naval aid on July 5, 1950. Even after, the government continued to hesitate on further involvement, especially on deploying infantry, where St. Laurent refused to conscript Canadian soldiers and was adamant on deploying only those who volunteered. On June 30 1950, with the war just beginning days prior, St. Laurent firmly declared that Canada was not at war and merely participating in a “collective police action”. This conference followed that of U.S. politicians who also used the same term. St. Laurent’s party was also careful to mention Canadian successes in Korea, and were strategic to flaunt them only minimally during pre-election campaigns in 1952 to 1953, in fear of “a revival of the old-anti-war hysteria”. This devaluing treatment of the war continued even after the return of Canadian forces, and prefaced the attitudes and treatments veterans would experience upon returning. Views that North Korea’s aggression was actually a Soviet plan in disguise also drew focus from Korea towards the communist power instead. The war ending in an armistice instead of a peace treaty or definitive victory also helped further bury interest in the Korean War.

=== Public indifference ===
Public attitude echoed the government’s lack of political sentiment. Despite the outcry of media outlets and the lines of volunteers for the war at recruitment centres, general public participation was marginal and more were concerned with matters such as a booming economy, increased taxation and improving social programs. Upon returning to Canada, no major parades were held to honour the Korean War veterans, only small community receptions. The few papers covering the war, such as Rossignol’s Parliament, the National Defence Act, and the decision to participate in1992, would echo politicians and continue to refer to it as "police action", “conflict” and “peacekeeping” even decades after its end. Such terminology also followed in the public.

=== Military indifference ===
Fellow World War II veterans often disparaged Korean War veterans’ experiences in comparison to the scale and atrocities of the prior war. Many Korean War veterans have recounted that local veteran associations, such as the Royal Canadian Legion, would deny their pensions, loans, and veteran status, expressing that the Korean War did not count as a war. Although Korean War veterans were officially granted the same benefits as those of World War II, veteran accounts indicate they were not well-aware of their benefits and of those that applied: only 3% in Britain and Canada actually received their pensions. Romeo Daley, for example, testified that he did not receive his until 2007 after giving the government much grief.

=== Improved recognition ===
The late 1900s and onwards saw an elevation in the status and recognition of Korean War veterans. In response to associations denying their membership, the veterans founded the Korea Veterans Association of Canada (KVA) in 1974 to support their fellow servicemen. In 1982, the Korean War was added to the National War Memorial. The KVA successfully lobbied for the Canadian Volunteer Service Medal for Korea, which was established in 1991, to recognize those who served in 1950 to 1954 in the Korean Peninsula. Several memorials have since been erected for or rededicated to include Korean War veterans, and many organizations, such as CBC and the Canadian War Museum, now commemorate the veterans by publishing videos of their testimonies on their experiences during and after the war.

== Timeline of Canadian involvement in Korea ==
1950	25 June – Korean People's Army crosses 38th parallel north, invading South Korea.; 25 June – United Nations drafts UNSC Resolution 82 calling for cessation of hostilities, and withdrawal of North Korean forces.; 30 July – HMCS Cayuga, HMCS Sioux and HMCS Athabaskan arrive in Japan.; 15 September – The Battle of Inchon halts the communist advance.; October – UN forces drive the Korean People's Army back beyond the 38th parallel, and continue to pursue them.; 19 October – Chinese forces enter North Korea, joining the war on North Korea's side.; 25 October – First contact between UN and Chinese forces.; 21 November – Dozens of soldiers en route to Fort Lewis for training are killed or injured in the Canoe River train crash.; 26 November – 13 December – Battle of Chosin Reservoir is fought, resulting in the first Chinese victory.
1951	January – 2nd Battalion, PPCLI joins the 27th Infantry Brigade (United Kingdom) and trains near Miryang; 6 February – 2nd Battalion, PPCLI enters combat.; 21 February - Operation Killer begins.; 22–25 April – Battle of Kapyong is fought, resulting in a decisive UN victory.; 25 May – The full 25th Canadian Infantry Brigade enters the line.; July – Commonwealth forces in Korea form the 1st Commonwealth Division.
1952	July – British Commonwealth Forces Korea supersedes the British Commonwealth Occupation Force.
1953	3 May - Battle of Hill 187 is fought between 3rd Battalion, The Royal Canadian Regiment and Chinese forces.; 27 July – Korean Armistice Agreement is declared, ending hostilities in the Korean War.; 5 August 1953 – Operation Big Switch began, 30 Canadian POWs returned.

== See also ==
- United Nations Forces in the Korean War
- Medical support in the Korean War
- Korean War Memorial Wall (Canada)
- Korean War in popular culture
- List of Korean War weapons
- Military history of Australia during the Korean War
- United Kingdom in the Korean War
- Australia in the Korean War
- New Zealand in the Korean War
