= HMCS Antigonish =

Canadian naval vessel

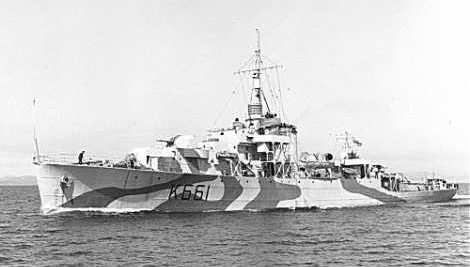
- HMCS Antigonish

History

Canada
- Name: Antigonish
- Namesake: Antigonish, Nova Scotia
- Ordered: 1 February 1943
- Builder: Yarrows Ltd., Esquimalt
- Laid down: 2 October 1943
- Launched: 10 February 1944
- Commissioned: 4 July 1944
- Decommissioned: 2 May 1946
- Identification: Pennant number: K661
- Recommissioned: 26 April 1947
- Decommissioned: 15 January 1954
- Recommissioned: 12 October 1957
- Decommissioned: 30 November 1966
- Identification: Pennant number: FFE 301
- Motto: Be worthy
- Honours and awards: Atlantic 1945; Gulf of St. Lawrence 1944
- Fate: Broken up in Japan, 1968
- Notes: Colours: Gold and black
- Badge: Blazon Argent, a bear rampant sable, langued gules, grasping and breaking with its forepaws a beech bough proper.

General characteristics
- Class & type: River-class frigate
- Displacement: 1,445 long tons (1,468 t) standard
- Length: 283 ft 0 in (86.26 m) p/p; 301 ft 4 in (91.85 m) o/a
- Beam: 36 ft 7 in (11.15 m)
- Draught: 9 ft 0 in (2.74 m)
- Propulsion: 2 × Admiralty 3-drum boilers, 2 shafts, reciprocating vertical triple expansion, 5,500 ihp (4,100 kW)
- Speed: 20 knots (37 km/h; 23 mph)
- Range: 7,200 nmi (13,300 km; 8,300 mi) at 12 knots (22 km/h; 14 mph)
- Complement: 145
- Sensors & processing systems: Type 147B Sword sonar; ASDIC
- Armament: 2 × 4-inch (102 mm) guns; 1 × 12-pounder naval gun; 4 × twin 20 mm (0.79 in) AA gus; 1 × Hedgehog mortar; up to 145 depth charges

HMCS Antigonish, named for Antigonish, Nova Scotia, was a River-class frigate that served in the Royal Canadian Navy in the Second World War in the Battle of the Atlantic from 1944 to 1945. The vessel was laid down on 2 October 1943 and launched on 10 February 1944. The ship was commissioned on 4 July 1944 and escorted transatlantic convoys providing anti-submarine protection. The frigate remained in service until after the end of the war, being decommissioned on 2 May 1946 placed in reserve. Antigonish was reactivated in 1947 for use as a training ship during the Korean War and remained as such until 1954 when she was decommissioned again. She was recommissioned on 12 October 1957 after undergoing a modernization program that reconfigured the ship into a Prestonian-class frigate. The vessel remained in service until 30 November 1966 and was sold for scrap, and broken up in Japan in 1968.

== Background ==
The River-class frigate design was an upgraded version of the Flower-class corvette, remedying many of the Flower class' issues as an ocean escort. The initial vessels were constructed for the Royal Navy and were named for rivers, however, in Canada, they were named for cities. Canada was informed of the design development in December 1940, but the plans were not delivered until late April 1941. The design was too large to fit through the canals on the St. Lawrence River, restricting the construction of the River-class ships to three shipyards, all with direct access to the sea. The first fifteen Canadian ships followed the standard British design.

The frigates measured 301 feet 4 inches (91.85 m) long overall and 283 ft 0 in (86.26 m) between perpendiculars with a beam of 36 ft 7 in (11.15 m) and a draught of 9 ft 0 in (2.74 m). They had a standard displacement of 1,445 long tons (1,468 t) and had increased flare and sheer forward to improve the vessel's dryness at sea. They were square amidships with deep bilge keels to alleviate rolling in heavy seas. They had a complement of 10 officers and 135 ratings.

The River class were powered by a steam created by two Admiralty three-drum boilers pumped to a vertical triple expansion engine turning two propeller shafts. The system creating 5,500 indicated horsepower (4,100 kW) giving the ships a maximum speed of 20 knots (37 km/h; 23 mph). They had a range of 7,200 nautical miles (13,300 km; 8,300 mi) at 12 knots (22 km/h; 14 mph).

The first 15 Canadian ships that followed the British design mounted a single 4-inch (102 mm) gun forward and one aft. The remaining Canadian ships mounted twin 4-inch guns forward and a single 12-pounder naval gun aft. The Canadian ships had eight 20 mm (0.79 in) cannon in four twin powered mounts for anti-aircraft defence. They also mounted four heavy machine guns. For anti-submarine warfare (ASW) the ships carried a Hedgehog ASW mortar forward and the frigates initially carried 100 depth charges, later rising to 145, to be fired from four throwers and two stern tracks and rails. Two of the throwers were located on the port side of the ship, and the other two on the starboard side. 30 charges were kept for the rails and racks and 32 for the throwers.

The River-class frigates were equipped with the Type 147B Sword sonar and ASDIC which were used in conjunction to find submarines below the surface. The combination of the two allowed for the frigates to maintain tracking targets even while firing. For tracking surfaced submarines, HFDF was installed. HFDF searched for the communication signals of opposing submarines, which had to surface to communicate.

=== Prestonian conversion ===
Due to the rapid expansion of the Royal Canadian Navy during and following the Korean War, twenty-one retired River-class frigates were reacquired and modified to what became known as the Prestonian conversion. The conversion removed the Hedgehog mortar and replaced it with two Squid anti-submarine mortars placed on the enclosed quarterdeck. The forecastle deck, which initially extended two-thirds the length of the ship, was extended fully aft and walled, creating additional interior space for habitability and anti-submarine equipment. Furthermore, the hull forward was strengthened against ice.

The bridge was made larger and fully enclosed. The taller bridge structure in turn required a taller funnel and the new ASW weaponry required a larger tripod mast. All of the new upper works were constructed of aluminium to save weight. The generating machinery was altered from three steam and one diesel generator to two steam and two diesel generators. The revised figures for the frigates became a 1,570-long-ton (1,600 t) standard displacement and 2,360 long tons (2,400 t) at full load with a draught of 16 feet (4.9 m) at full load. The frigates now had increased range, capable of 9,600 nautical miles (17,800 km; 11,000 mi) at 12 knots.

== Service history ==
Antigonish was ordered as part of the 1943–44 River-class building programme. She was laid down by Yarrows Ltd. at their shipyard in Esquimalt, British Columbia, on 2 October 1943 and launched on 10 February 1944. She was commissioned at Victoria, British Columbia on 4 July 1944 with the pennant K661. After transiting to Halifax, Nova Scotia in Canada's Maritimes, the vessel paused to undergo minor repairs. Antigonish was then sent to Bermuda to work up. Upon the frigate's return to Halifax, Antigonish was assigned to the convoy escort group (EG) 16 to take part in the Battle of the Atlantic. In December 1944, with Antigonish as Senior Officer's Ship, EG 16 was deployed to Canadian waters for operations. The ship remained with the unit for the rest of the European war, making a couple of trips to Gibraltar. After the end of combat in Europe and with the war ongoing against Japan, Antigonish returned to Canada in June 1945 and was selected for a tropicalization refit at Pictou, Nova Scotia on 1 July for possible service in the Pacific Ocean. This refit was completed on 17 November. However, by then the war with Japan had ended and Antigonish was ordered to Esquimalt where she was decommissioned into the reserve on 5 February 1946. For service in the Second World War, Antigonish was awarded the battle honours "Atlantic 1945" and "Gulf of St. Lawrence 1944".

=== Post-war service ===
Antigonish was reactivated on 26 April 1947 for use as a training ship until 15 January 1954. In October 1948, Antigonish joined the cruiser Ontario and destroyers Cayuga, Athabaskan, Crescent in sailing to Pearl Harbor, Hawaii; the largest deployment of the Royal Canadian Navy following the war. In January 1952, Beacon Hill and Antigonish deployed on a training cruise to South America along the Pacific coast, making several port visits. In May, Sioux, Antigonish and Beacon Hill travelled to Juneau, Alaska and in August, to San Diego on training cruises.

She was one of twenty-one River-class frigates chosen to undergo conversion to a Prestonian-class frigate. She was converted in 1956–1957 and was recommissioned with pennant 301 on 12 October 1957. During service with the Fourth Canadian Escort Squadron she was fitted with a midship deckhouse to provide classroom and training facilities for officer candidates. In January 1960, Antigonish and three other Prestonian-class ships made a tour of South American ports, visiting San Diego, Balboa, the Galapagos Islands, Callao and Valparaíso, Talara and Long Beach. Antigonish was a member of the Fourth Canadian Escort Squadron based out of Esquimalt. In June 1960 the Fourth Canadian Escort Squadron performed a training tour of the Pacific, with stops at Yokohama, Japan, Midway Atoll and Pearl Harbor. They returned to Canada in August. She remained in a training role until she was paid off by the RCN on 30 November 1966. She was sold for scrap and broken up in Japan in 1968.

== Ship's badge, bells and colours ==
During her postwar service, Antigonish was awarded a ship's badge with is described as a "Blazon Argent, a bear rampant sable, langued gules, grasping and breaking with its forepaws a beech bough proper." The frigate was also given the official colours of gold and black and took the motto, "Be Worthy".

Two of the ship's known bells of HMCS Antigonish are in the care and custody of the Maritime Museum of British Columbia; the third is in the care and custody of the Chiefs' and Petty Officers Mess at Canadian Forces Base Halifax, Nova Scotia. The bell in Halifax has a list of those christened on board from 1947 to 1964. The Christening Bells Project at Canadian Forces Base Esquimalt Naval and Military Museum in British Columbia includes information from the bell.

== See also ==
- List of ships of the Canadian Navy
