= R79 =

R79 may refer to:

- HMCS Athabaskan (R79), a destroyer of the Royal Canadian Navy
- Small nucleolar RNA R79
