= HMCS Ontario (C53) =

Minotaur-class cruiser

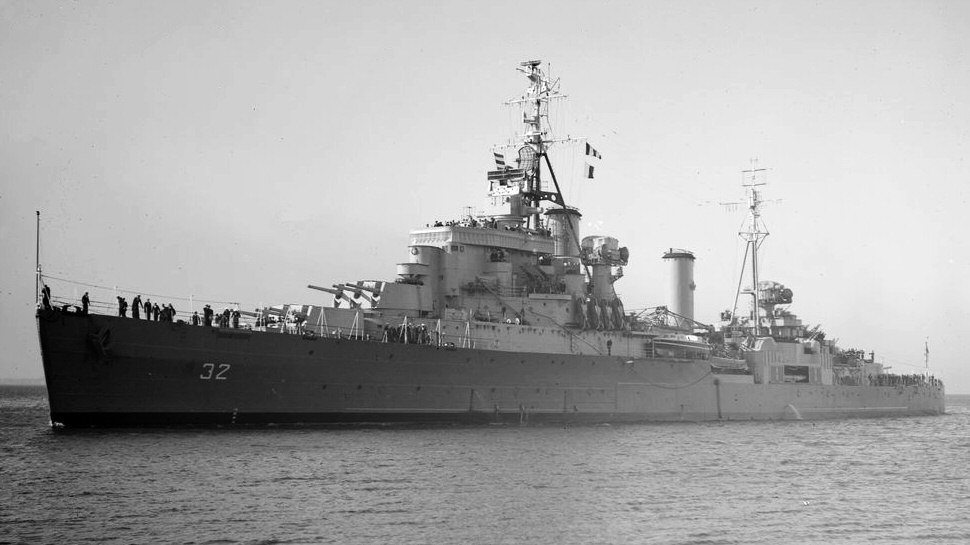
- HMCS Ontario in 1951

History

United Kingdom
- Name: Minotaur
- Builder: Harland & Wolff, Belfast
- Yard number: 1171
- Laid down: 20 November 1941
- Launched: 29 July 1943
- Fate: Transferred to Royal Canadian Navy in July 1944

Canada
- Name: Ontario
- Acquired: July 1944
- Commissioned: 25 May 1945
- Decommissioned: 15 October 1958
- Motto: "Ut incepit fidelis sic permanent" (Loyal she has been and remains so)
- Fate: Scrapped, arriving at Osaka for breaking up on 19 November 1960

General characteristics
- Class & type: Minotaur-class light cruiser
- Displacement: 8,800 tons standard; 11,130 tons full
- Length: 555.5 ft (169.3 m)
- Beam: 63 ft (19 m)
- Draught: 17.25 ft (5.26 m)
- Propulsion: Four Admiralty-type three drum boilers; Four shaft Parsons steam turbines; 72,500 shp (54,100 kW)
- Speed: 31.5 knots (58.3 km/h)
- Range: 2,000 nautical miles (3,700 km) at 30 knots (60 km/h); 8,000 nautical miles (15,000 km) at 16 knots (30 km/h); 1,850 tons fuel oil
- Complement: 867
- Armament: Three triple 6-inch / 50 Mk 23 guns; Five dual 4-inch / 45 QF Mk 16 HA guns; Four quad QF 2-pdr guns; Six single 40 mm AA guns; Two triple 21 inch (533 mm) torpedo tubes
- Armour: 3.25–3.5-inch (83–89 mm) belt; 2-inch (51 mm) deck; 1–2-inch (25–51 mm) turrets; 1.5–2-inch (38–51 mm) bulkheads

HMCS Ontario was a Minotaur-class light cruiser built for the Royal Navy as HMS Minotaur (53), but transferred to the Royal Canadian Navy on completion and renamed Ontario.

HMS Minotaur was laid down on 20 November 1941 by Harland & Wolff of Belfast and launched on 29 July 1943. She was transferred to the Royal Canadian Navy in July 1944, and completed and commissioned as Ontario on 25 May 1945 at Belfast.

== Service history ==
After commissioning she was worked up on the River Clyde in Scotland. She sailed to join the 4th Cruiser Squadron in the Pacific Theatre, but was too late to see active service, although she was employed in the operations at Hong Kong, Manila and in Japan. She returned home for refit, arriving at Esquimalt, British Columbia on 27 November 1945.

In October 1948, Ontario was joined by the destroyers Cayuga, Athabaskan, Crescent and the frigate Antigonish in sailing to Pearl Harbor, Hawaii; the largest deployment of the Royal Canadian Navy following the war. In January 1949, Ontario took part in the largest training cruise by the Royal Canadian Navy to that date which included the aircraft carrier Magnificent, the destroyers Haida, Athabaskan and the frigate Antigonish. The group, designated CTF 215, participated in naval exercises with US and British vessels in the Caribbean Sea. In February 1951, Ontario sailed to Australia, taking part in joint naval exercises with the Royal Australian Navy. On the way the ship made several port visits, returning to Canada in June. In October 1951, Ontario sailed to the east coast where after arrival, Princess Elizabeth and Prince Philip, Duke of Edinburgh sailed on the cruiser from Sydney, Nova Scotia, through the Cabot Strait to Newfoundland during the Royal Visit. The ship returned to Esquimalt following the tour, arriving in December. From September to December 1952, Ontario sailed around South America on a training cruise, making several port visits. While entering the harbour at Buenos Aires, the cruiser was overtaken by the merchant vessel SS Arauco and struck amidships. The ship continued on her cruise until arriving at Rio de Janeiro on 6 November. There it was found that the starboard propellers were damaged. The outer propeller was removed and repairs were made to the inner one. After nearly two weeks at Rio de Janeiro, Ontario was forced to return to Esquimalt at a reduced speed.

On 15 June 1953 the cruiser took part in the Fleet Review to celebrate the Coronation of Queen Elizabeth II. In January 1954, Ontario began a training cruise across the Pacific, visiting Australia, New Zealand and Tonga before returning to Esquimalt in April. Ontario performed a three-month training cruise to Australia and New Zealand in early 1955, returning to Canada on 2 April. The cruiser then departed on 25 April for a four-month cruise of Europe. In June 1956 Ontario departed Esquimalt for a two-month summer training cruise along the coasts of North and South America, going as far south as Ecuador. The cruiser returned to port on 10 August after meeting the Second Canadian Escort Squadron off the coast of California.

Ontario was paid off on 15 October 1958. The ship was sold to a west coast firm which began but did not finish the job of breaking up the ship at Vancouver. The ship was resold, along with HMCS Quebec, to Mitsui and Co. of Japan. She arrived at Osaka for breaking up on 19 November 1960.

== Ship's bell ==
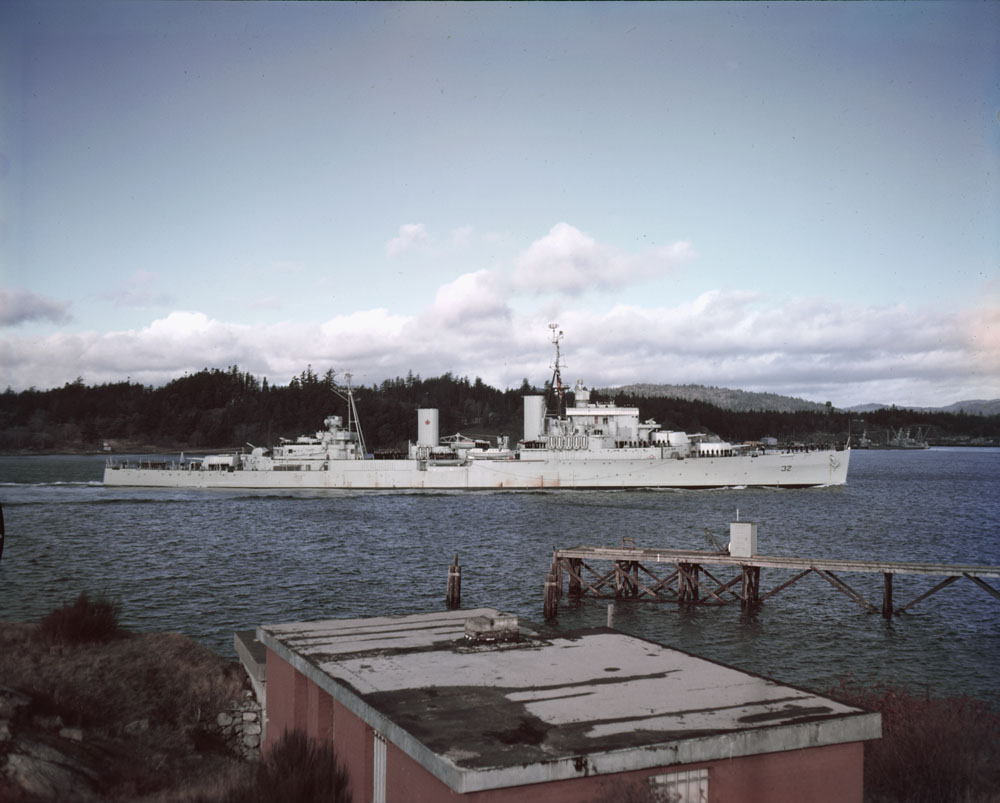
HMCS Ontario in 1958

The ship's bell of HMCS Ontario is currently held at HMCS Ontario Cadet Training Centre in Kingston, Ontario. The second bell is held by the Maritime Museum of British Columbia. The Christening Bells Project at Canadian Forces Base Esquimalt Naval and Military Museum includes information from the ship's bell of HMCS Ontario, which was used for baptism of babies on board ship.

== Later use of the name ==
On 13 July 1981 Royal Canadian Sea Cadet Camp Frontenac was renamed Ontario Sea Cadet Training Establishment located in Kingston, Ontario, Canada, at the Royal Military College of Canada. In later years Ontario would be redesignated as HMCS Ontario Sea Cadet Summer Training Centre.

Effective 2015 all training centres were redesignated to a standard format, Ontario is now designated as HMCS Ontario Cadet Training Centre.
