= HMCS Crescent =

C-class destroyer

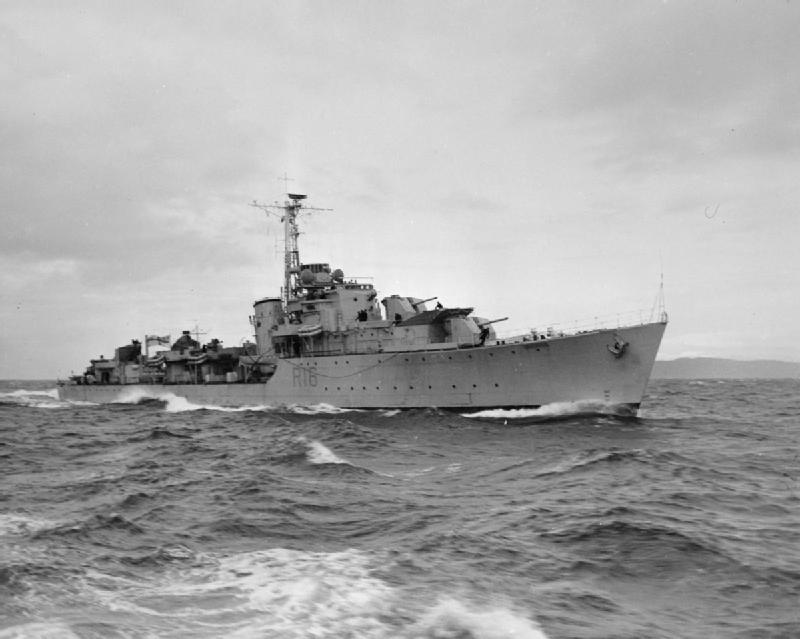
- Crescent in 1945

History

United Kingdom
- Name: Crescent
- Builder: John Brown & Company, Clydebank
- Yard number: 607
- Laid down: 16 September 1943
- Launched: 20 July 1944
- Identification: Pennant number: R16
- Fate: Transferred to Canada in January 1945

Canada
- Name: Crescent
- Acquired: loaned 1945, purchased 1951
- Commissioned: 10 September 1945
- Decommissioned: 1 April 1970
- Identification: Pennant number: DDE 226
- Motto: In virture cresco (I grow in virture)
- Fate: Scrapped 1971
- Badge: Navy blue, a crescent argent defamed with a maple leaf gules for Canada

General characteristics (as built)
- Class & type: C-class destroyer
- Displacement: 1,900 long tons (1,930 t) standard; 2,535 long tons (2,576 t) full load
- Length: 362.75 ft (110.57 m)
- Beam: 35.6 ft (10.9 m)
- Draught: 10 ft 6 in (3.20 m)
- Propulsion: 2 Admiralty 3-drum boilers, Parsons single-reduction geared steam turbines, 40,000 shp (30 MW), 2 shafts
- Speed: 36 kn (67 km/h; 41 mph); 32 kn (59 km/h; 37 mph) (full load)
- Range: 4,675 nautical miles (8,658 km; 5,380 mi) at 20 knots (37 km/h; 23 mph); 1,400 nautical miles (2,600 km; 1,600 mi) at 32 knots (59 km/h; 37 mph)
- Complement: 186
- Sensors & processing systems: Mark 63 fire-control system
- Armament: 4 × QF 4.5 in (114 mm) L/45 Mk IV guns on mounts CP Mk.V; 2 × Bofors 40 mm L/60 guns on twin mount "Hazemeyer" Mk.IV; 2 × single 2-pdr Mk VIII; 2 × 20 mm Oerlikon cannon

HMCS Crescent was a C-class destroyer that was built for the Royal Navy but was transferred before completion and saw active service with the Royal Canadian Navy. She was one of 32 destroyers of that class built between 1943 and 1945 as part of the War Emergency Programme.

After discussions about Canada's current fleet, the United Kingdom agreed to lend the Royal Canadian Navy a flotilla of C-class destroyers in January 1945. The ships had yet to be constructed and the surrender of Japan ended the war before any of the eight could be finished. In the end, only two were transferred, Crescent and Crusader, both named after ships which had been previously transferred to Canada and renamed. This time, they kept their names as the transfer was only made permanent in 1951.

== Operational history ==
Crescent was ordered as the leader of the 14th Emergency Flotilla. The keel was laid down on 16 September 1943 by John Brown & Company, Clydebank and launched on 20 July 1944. The ship was transferred to Canada in August 1945. The ship was commissioned by Canada and assigned to the west coast of Canada, arriving at Esquimalt, British Columbia in November 1945.

In April 1948, while returning from a training cruise with the cruiser Ontario, the two ships came across a floating mine left over from the Second World War. The cruiser was forced to make an emergency turn to avoid the mine and Crescent destroyed it with gunfire. In October 1948, Crescent joined Ontario, destroyers Cayuga, Athabaskan and the frigate Antigonish in sailing to Pearl Harbor, Hawaii; the largest deployment of the Royal Canadian Navy following the war. She was given training duties until February 1949 when she was sent to China to safeguard Canadian interests during the Chinese Civil War. This was the first operational deployment of a Canadian warship since the end of the Second World War. Crescent arrived at Shanghai on 26 February after pausing at Guam. Crescent, the first Canadian warship to enter Chinese waters, sailed to Nanjing via the Yangtze River on 11 March.

=== 1949 'mutiny' ===
On 20 March 1949, Crescent was at Nanjing, China – at the time the last mainland holdout of Chiang Kai-shek's Chinese Nationalists, which was to be overrun by the Communist People's Liberation Army a month later – eighty-three of Crescent's junior ratings locked themselves in their messdecks, and refused to come out until getting the captain to hear their grievances. The captain acted with great sensitivity to defuse the crisis, entering the mess for an informal discussion with the disgruntled crew members and carefully avoided using the term "mutiny" which could have had severe legal consequences for the sailors involved.

This case was almost simultaneous with two other cases of mass disobedience in other Canadian naval ships at very distant other locations: the destroyer Athabaskan at Manzanillo, Colima, Mexico and the aircraft carrier Magnificent in the Caribbean Sea. In both of these other cases, the respective captains acted similarly to their colleague aboard Crescent. On 23 March, the destroyer was relieved on station at Nanjing by HMS Consort and sailed for Hong Kong. The ship remained in China until May when Crescent sailed for home. In November 1949, Crescent was paid off into the reserve. In 1950, the destroyer was designated the east coast training destroyer and her complement reduced.

In May 1951, Crescent, La Hulloise and Swansea sailed to the United Kingdom on a training cruise. In May 1952, with La Hulloise and Swansea, the destroyer made a training cruise to Gibraltar and the French Riviera. Crescent and La Hulloise returned to Europe in August and in December, the two ships visited Cuba while training in the Caribbean Sea.

=== Refit and return to service ===
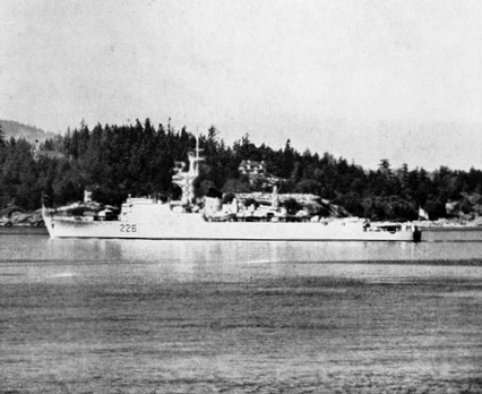
Crescent in 1958, post conversion

In 1953, Crescent underwent a conversion to destroyer escort. She was modernised for anti-submarine warfare and to serve as a fast fleet escort, similar to the Type 15 frigate of the Royal Navy, the second Canadian warship to so. The superstructure was extended aft, and the bridge was modified. Half of her gun armament was replaced by sonar, a Mark 10 Limbo anti-submarine mortar and homing torpedoes. The project was considered the largest operation undertaken by a Canadian dockyard to that point. While under refit, Crescent was assigned to the Second Canadian Escort Squadron on 1 January 1955. The ship was recommissioned on 31 October 1955, followed by three months of extensive sea trials. In 1959, she was used as a test bed for the new variable depth sonar and was eventually permanently installed.

Crescent served in an anti-submarine role until being paid off 1 April 1970 at Victoria. She was taken to Taiwan in 1971 to be broken up.

== Ship's bell ==
The Christening Bells Project at Canadian Forces Base Esquimalt Naval and Military Museum includes information from the ship's bell of Crescent, which was used for baptism of babies on board ship from 1946 to 1957. The bell is held by the Army Navy and Air Force Veterans, Sidney, British Columbia.

== See also ==
- 1949 Mutinies in the Royal Canadian Navy

== Sources ==
- Arbuckle, J. Graeme (1987). Badges of the Canadian Navy. Halifax, Nova Scotia: Nimbus Publishing. ISBN 0-920852-49-1.
- Boutiller, James A., ed. (1982). RCN in Retrospect, 1910–1968. Vancouver: University of British Columbia Press. ISBN 0-7748-0196-4.
- Colledge, J. J.; Warlow, Ben (2006) [1969]. Ships of the Royal Navy: The Complete Record of All Fighting Ships of the Royal Navy from the 15th Century to the Present (3rd Rev ed.). London: Chatham Publishing. ISBN 978-1-86176-281-8. OCLC 67375475.
- Macpherson, Ken; Barrie, Ron (2002). The Ships of Canada's Naval Forces, 1910–2002 (3 ed.). St. Catharines, Ontario: Vanwell Publishing Limited. ISBN 1551250721.
- Tracy, Nicholas (2012). A Two-Edged Sword: The Navy as an Instrument of Canadian Foreign Policy. Montreal, Quebec and Kingston, Ontario: McGill-Queens University Press. ISBN 978-0-7735-4051-4.
- Zimmerman, David (2015). Maritime Command Pacific: The Royal Canadian Navy's West Coast Fleet in the Early Cold War. Vancouver: UBC Press. ISBN 978-0-7748-3034-8.
