= HMCS Magnificent =

Majestic-class light aircraft carrier

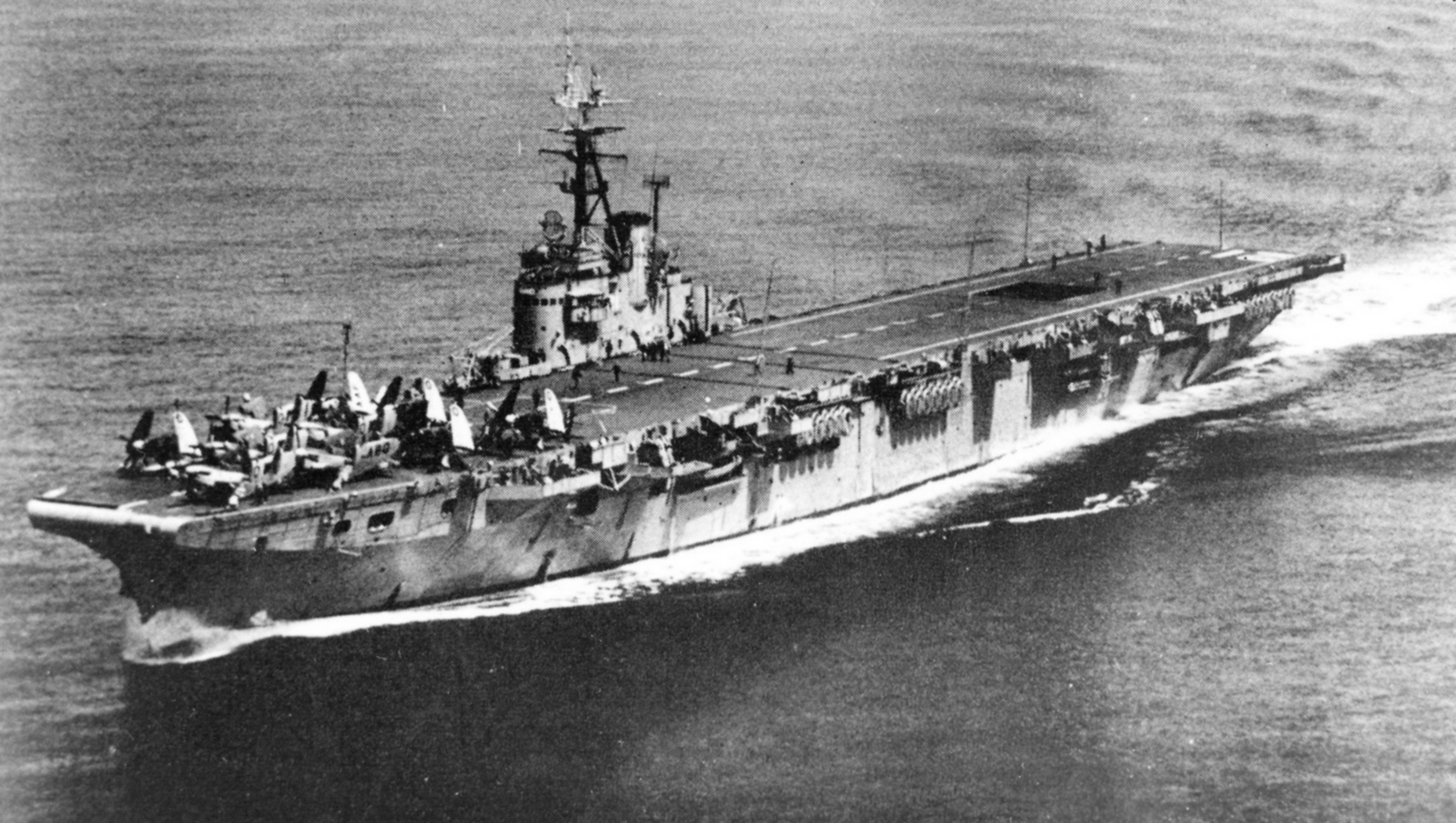
- HMCS Magnificent circa 1950.

History

United Kingdom
- Name: Magnificent
- Ordered: 16 October 1942
- Builder: Harland and Wolff, Belfast
- Yard number: 1228
- Laid down: 29 July 1943
- Launched: 16 November 1944
- Fate: Loaned to Canada, 1948

Canada
- Name: Magnificent
- Acquired: January 1945
- Commissioned: 21 March 1948
- Decommissioned: 14 June 1957
- Stricken: 1961
- Home port: Halifax, Nova Scotia
- Identification: CVL 21
- Motto: "We stand on guard"
- Nickname(s): "The Maggie"
- Honours and awards: The Saints 1782; Dardanelles 1915
- Fate: Returned to UK, scrapped in Faslane, July 1965
- Badge: Purpure, a sun in splendour or on which a maple leaf gules

General characteristics
- Class & type: Majestic-class aircraft carrier
- Displacement: 15,700 long tons (16,000 t)
- Length: 698 ft (212.8 m)
- Beam: 80 ft (24.4 m)
- Draught: 25 ft (7.6 m)
- Propulsion: 4 Admiralty 3-drum boilers, 2 shafts, Parsons geared steam turbines, 40,000 shp (30,000 kW)
- Speed: 24 knots (44 km/h; 28 mph)
- Complement: 1,100 (including air group)
- Sensors & processing systems: Type 281 radar; Type 293 radar; 2 × Type 277 radars
- Armament: 24 × 2-pounder AA guns; 19 × Bofors 40 mm guns
- Aircraft carried: 37 - Fairey Firefly and Hawker Sea Fury

HMCS Magnificent (CVL 21) was a Majestic-class light aircraft carrier that served the Royal Canadian Navy from 1948–1957. Initially ordered by the Royal Navy during World War II, the Royal Canadian Navy acquired the Magnificent while waiting for another aircraft carrier to be completed to their needs and it entered service in 1948 replacing in service HMCS Warrior which had been loaned for two years by the RN.

Magnificent was generally referred to as Maggie in Canadian service. In 1956, Canada received HMCS Bonaventure and Magnificent returned to the United Kingdom in 1956, where it remained in reserve until being scrapped in 1965.

== Description and construction ==
The 1942 Design Light Fleet carrier was divided into the original ten Colossus-class ships, followed by the five Majestic-class ships, which had some design changes that accommodated larger and heavier aircraft. The changes reduced the weight of petrol and fuel storage by reducing them to 75,000 gallons, to offset the additional weight from strengthening of the deck to operate aircraft as heavy as 20,000 pounds (9,100 kg). Further improvements over the Colossus class included larger aircraft elevators (54 by 34 feet, 16 m × 10 m) and improvements made to internal subdivisions for survivability purposes and accommodations.

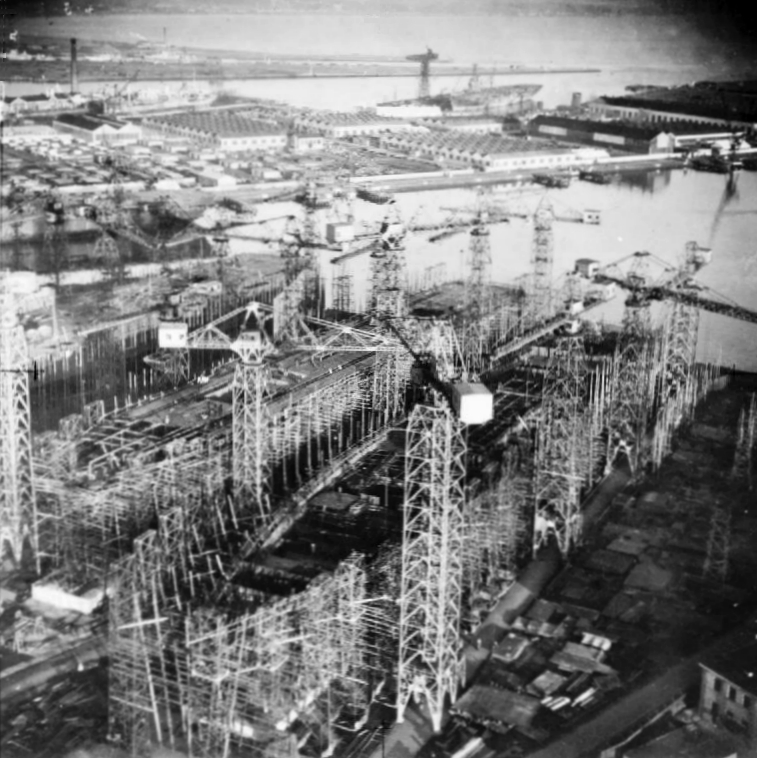
Magnificent (left) under construction

The ship was 698 feet (212.8 m) long with a beam of 80 ft (24.4 m) and a draught of 25 ft (7.6 m). The carrier displaced 15,700 long tons (16,000 t). The ship was powered by steam from four Admiralty three-drum boilers. This propelled two Parsons geared steam turbines driving two shafts creating 40,000 shaft horsepower (30,000 kW). Magnificent had a top speed of 24 knots (44 km/h; 28 mph).

The aircraft carrier was armed with 24 2-pounder and 19 Bofors 40 mm guns for anti-aircraft defence. Majestic-class carriers were fitted out with Type 281, Type 293 and two Type 277 radar installations. The ship had a complement of 1,100, including the air group.

The third ship of the Majestic class, Magnificent was ordered 16 October 1942. The order was placed with Harland and Wolff in Belfast who were also constructing the Colossus-class ships Glory and Warrior. Magnificent was laid down on 29 July 1943 with the yard number 1228 and launched on 16 November 1944.

=== Aircraft ===
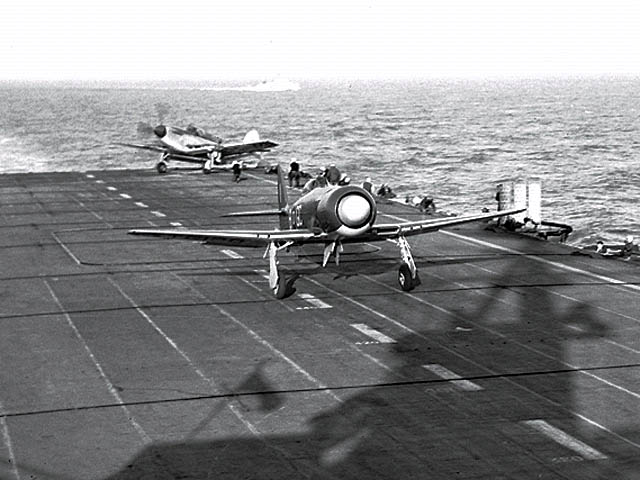
A Hawker Sea Fury and a Fairey Firefly aboard Magnificent circa 1947.

Magnificent operated both fixed and rotary-wing aircraft. In preparation for her joining the Royal Canadian Navy, the two squadrons formerly assigned to Warrior, 803 and 825 Squadrons, were designated 19th Air Group and embarked Sea Furies and Firefly IVs respectively. 883 (fighter) and 826 (torpedo bomber/reconnaissance) Squadrons were re-activated and formed the 18th Carrier Air Group. They embarked Seafires and older model Fireflies respectively.

In 1950, the Canadian government purchased 75 Grumman TBF Avengers from the United States Navy for use on Magnificent. They were intended to replace the Fireflies in 825 and 826 Squadrons. In May 1951, the squadrons were renumbered with 18 Air Group becoming 30 Air Group with 883 Squadron becoming 871 Squadron and 826 Squadron becoming 881 Squadron. 19 Air Group became 31 (Support) Air Group with its squadrons being renumbered from 803 and 825 becoming 870 and 880 respectively.

In 1955, the RCN purchased Sikorsky H04S helicopters and equipped them with dunking sonars. The first squadron, HS-50, embarked aboard Magnificent in July 1955. In September 1955, the Canadian navy began using United States Navy-style designations for its air units. VF-871 was composed of Sea Furies and VS-881 comprised Avengers. In February 1956, Magnificent embarked a second helicopter unit, HU-21.

== Acquisition ==
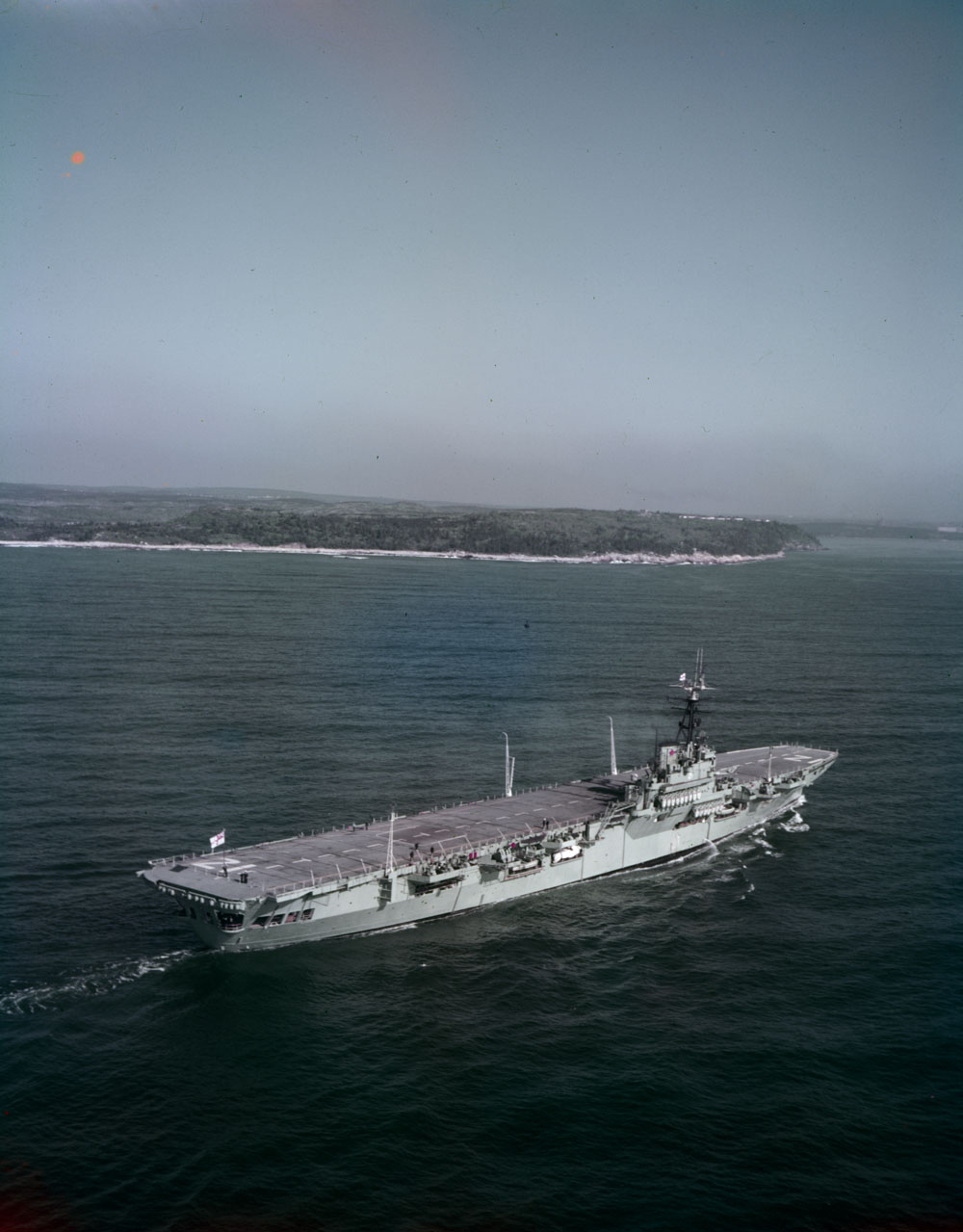
HMCS Magnificent in June 1954

In May 1944, the Royal Canadian Navy (RCN) intended to expand its fleet in size of ships if it were to take on a larger role in the Pacific theatre. In October, the RCN offered to exchange the American-built escort carriers the RCN was managing, the operational Puncher and the heavily damaged (did not return to service) Nabob, with the intention to acquire larger aircraft carriers from the Royal Navy. The six Majestic-class ships were considered surplus to Royal Navy plans, and the three furthest along in construction were offered for loan.

In January 1945 the RCN negotiated the loan of two ships, Warrior (Colossus class) and Magnificent, with the option to purchase at a later date. The government approved the deal in February 1945. As Warrior was nearly complete, having been built in a hurry to serve in the Pacific Theater of war and not for operation in cold climates, she was the first of the two transferred to the RCN and commissioned as HMCS Warrior on 24 January 1946. She officially joined the Canadian Atlantic Fleet on 23 March, but required further work to address builder's defects. The ship had problems with her unheated equipment during operations in cold North Atlantic waters off eastern Canada during 1946, and she was transferred to the Canadian Pacific Fleet, arriving in Esquimalt, British Columbia, in December 1946. While undergoing repairs in January 1947, the RCN was examining the overall impact of reduced defence spending and manning constraints, and came to the conclusion that they could not operate two aircraft carriers. Negotiations began to return Warrior when Magnificent became ready, with the RCN deeming Warrior unfit for service due to her lack of heating. As Magnificent was still under construction, all preparations were included to make her fully capable of operating in cold climates. The carrier was commissioned into the Royal Canadian Navy on 21 March 1948, and Warrior was decommissioned two days later as an RCN ship and returned to the RN, which commissioned her into RN service a few months later.

== Operational history ==
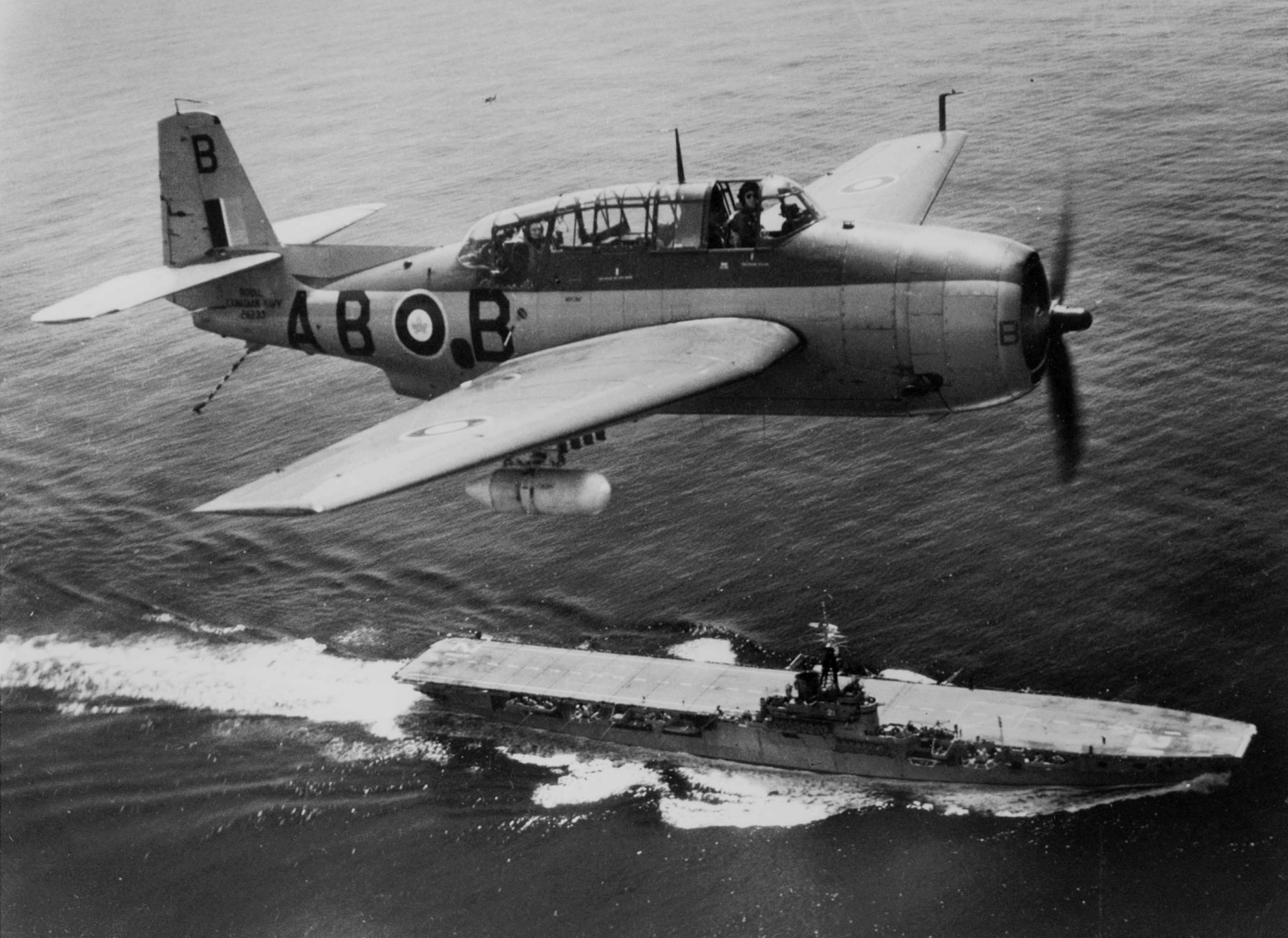
An Avenger torpedo bomber flies past Magnificent in 1953

Following her arrival in Halifax on 1 June 1948, Magnificent performed workups. During workups she lost two aircraft. She was deployed in September 1948 to the Hudson Strait in one of her first missions. With the destroyers Nootka and Haida, the aircraft carrier sailed on a training cruise to the Ungava peninsula in Quebec, halting at Wakeham Bay, Quebec. From there the two destroyers left the aircraft carrier and toured the north, becoming the first RCN warships to penetrate Hudson Bay. In January 1949, Magnificent sailed to the United Kingdom to embark Firefly Vs that replaced the Firefly IVs of 825 Squadron. Upon the aircraft carrier's return, 825 Squadron was disembarked at Dartmouth, Nova Scotia and 803, 883 and 826 Squadrons embarked for the training cruise to the Caribbean Sea.

=== 1949 'mutiny' ===
On 20 March 1949, while on fleet manoeuvres in the Caribbean, thirty-two aircraft handlers on Magnificent briefly refused an order to turn to morning cleaning stations to protest various grievances. The captain acted with great sensitivity to defuse the crisis, holding an informal discussion with the disgruntled crew members and carefully using the term "incident" instead of "mutiny", which could have resulted in severe legal consequences for the handlers.

At almost the same time, similar incidents happened on Crescent, at Nanjing, China, and on Athabaskan at Manzanillo, Colima, Mexico, both of whose captains acted similarly to that of Magnificent.

=== Training and visits ===
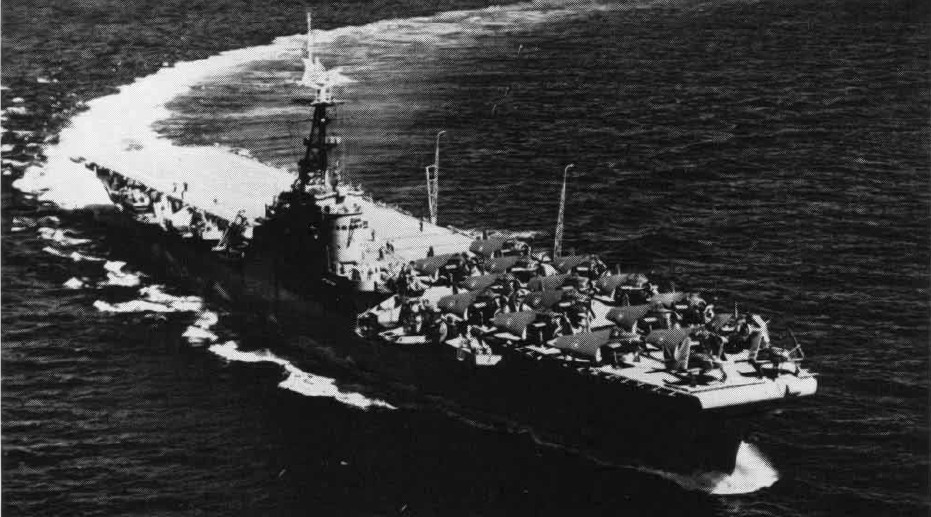
Magnificent in the mid-1950s

Following the incident in the Caribbean, in June 1949, she went aground off Port Mouton, Nova Scotia. With the help of destroyers, Maggie was refloated and taken to Saint John for repairs. With the outbreak of the Korean War, Magnificent was withheld from service in that theatre on the grounds that she was already committed to NATO duties.

Magnificent spent most of her time performing port visits and training. In December 1951, the carrier began a refit lasting until March 1952. In September 1952, the carrier took part in the large NATO Exercise Mainbrace, and again in 1953 as part of the exercise "Mariner". In 1953 she took part in the Fleet Review to celebrate the Coronation of Queen Elizabeth II. 16 aircraft (8 Sea Furies and 8 Avengers) took part in the fly past. In March 1954, Maggie underwent a refit at Portsmouth. In 1955, Magnificent sailed to the Caribbean Sea for training exercises with the US and Royal Navies, escorted by Micmac and Haida and then sailed to Portsmouth before returning to Canada. The aircraft carrier, escorted by Micmac, Haida and Huron, made a second cruise to Europe beginning in September, making several port visits and participating in two NATO naval exercises. In 1956, she operated helicopters from her deck for the first time during a naval exercise. That same year, on 10 October, a TBF Avenger made the last fixed-wing flight from the deck of Magnificent.

=== Suez Crisis ===
On 6 November 1956, the St. Laurent government chose to join the United Nations Emergency Force, agreeing to send ground forces to Egypt. Magnificent was chosen to transport the men and supplies to Egypt, being withdrawn from a training exercise to do so in November. In preparation for use as a transport, the ship's weapons were stripped, and her complement reduced to 600. The initial plan was to embark the Queen's Own Rifles of Canada, however that order was rescinded in December. Magnificent waited in Halifax until the end of the month when she embarked 406 Canadian troops and their vehicles along with 4 Royal Canadian Air Force de Havilland Canada DHC-3 Otters and a single H04S helicopter and sailed for Egypt. She arrived in Port Said in early January 1957. This was to be her last role, carrying a large part of the Canadian peacekeeping force to Egypt, its vehicles parked on her deck. She returned to Canada in March.

=== Decommissioning ===
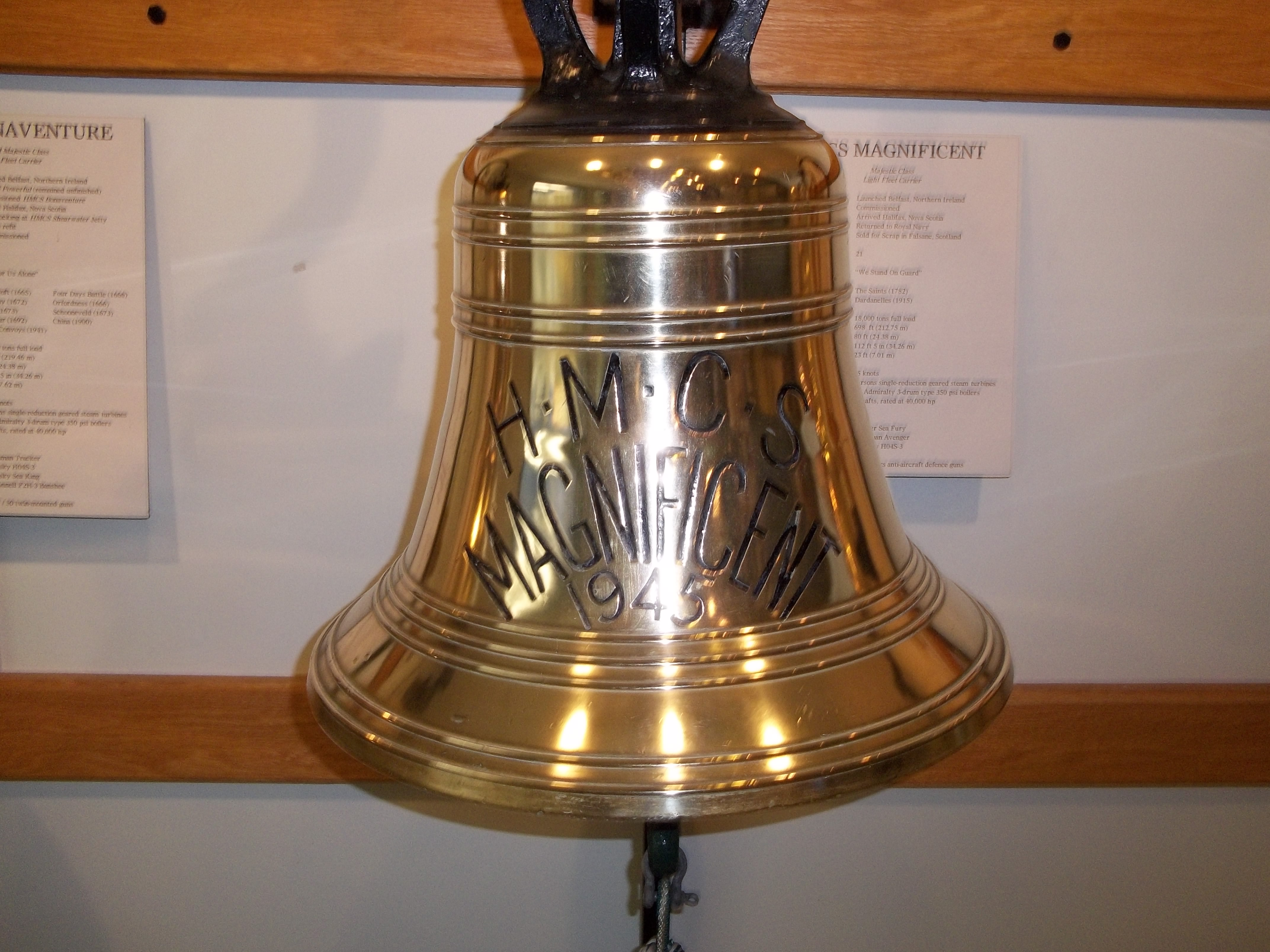
Magnificent's bell, located at Shearwater Museum

Magnificent left Canada in April 1957 and arrived at Plymouth on 14 June for decommissioning. She was replaced in RCN service by Bonaventure, another Royal Navy Majestic-class carrier (HMS Powerful) that had not been completed at the end of the war. She was returned to the RN in 1957 and placed in reserve until disposed of. Magnificent's inability to operate the modern jet aircraft of the time led to her return and replacement. The ship was placed on the disposal list in 1961 and remained there until 1965. The ship was broken up at Faslane, Scotland, in July 1965.

== See also ==
- List of aircraft carriers
