= HMCS Cayuga =

Former destroyer of the Royal Canadian Navy

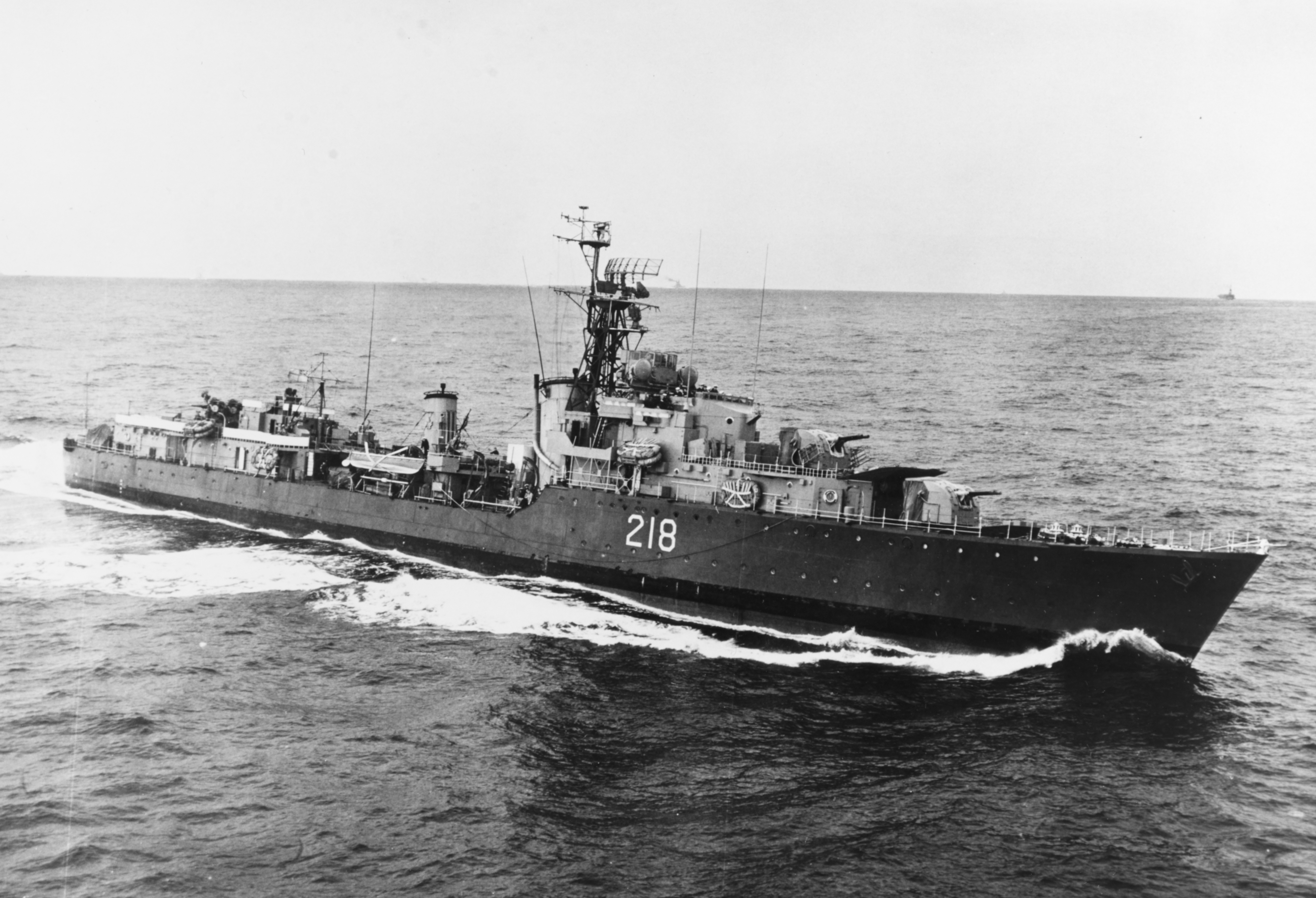
- Cayuga in 1954

History

Canada
- Name: Cayuga
- Namesake: Cayuga nation
- Ordered: April 1942
- Builder: Halifax Shipyards, Halifax
- Laid down: 7 October 1943
- Launched: 28 July 1945
- Commissioned: 20 October 1947
- Decommissioned: 27 February 1964
- Identification: pennant number: R04 Later DDE 218
- Motto: Onenh owa den dya; ("Now let us proceed")
- Honours and awards: Korea 1950–52
- Fate: Scrapped, Faslane 1965
- Notes: Livery Colours: Gold and scarlet
- Badge: Blazon Or, an Indian of the Cayuga tribe, facing dexter, in kneeling posture, right knee on the ground, left leg bent and forward, two feathers in hair, lower part of body clad, upper bare, a quiver of arrows pendant from the left shoulder, the base resting on ground beside the right knee, the Indian holding a bow and arrow in the "ready" position all gules.

General characteristics
- Class & type: Tribal-class destroyer
- Displacement: 1,850 tons (standard), 2,520 tons (full)
- Length: 377 ft (114.9 m)
- Beam: 37.5 ft (11.4 m)
- Draught: 9 ft (2.7 m)
- Propulsion: 3 × Admiralty 3-drum boilers, steam turbines, 2 shafts, 44,000 shp
- Speed: 36 knots (67 km/h)
- Range: 5,700 nautical miles (10,600 km) at 15 knots (28 km/h); 524 tons oil
- Complement: 190 (219 as leader)
- Armament: 8 – 4 in L/45 QF Mk.XVI guns, 4 × twin mounting HA Mk.XIX; 1 × twin 40 mm Bofors mount Mk.V; 4 × single 40 mm Bofors mount Mk.III; 1 × tubes for 21-inch (530 mm) torpedoes Mk.IX; 1 × rack, 2 × throwers for depth charges

HMCS Cayuga was a Tribal-class destroyer that served in the Royal Canadian Navy from 1946 until 1964. She saw action in the Korean War. She was named for the Cayuga nation, a First Nations people of Canada.

== Construction and career ==
Cayuga was ordered in April 1942 as part of the 1942 building programme. She was laid down on 7 October 1943 by Halifax Shipyards at Halifax, Nova Scotia and launched 28 July 1945. Cayuga was commissioned on 20 October 1947 at Halifax with the pennant number R04.

On 4 February 1948, Cayuga transferred to the west coast for Esquimalt, British Columbia. In October 1948, Cayuga joined the cruiser Ontario, destroyers Athabaskan, Crescent and the frigate Antigonish in sailing to Pearl Harbor, Hawaii; the largest deployment of the Royal Canadian Navy following the war. In March 1950, with Ontario and Sioux, the destroyer participated in a training cruise to Mexico, making several port visits.

=== Korean War ===
Cayuga served a total of three tours of Korea, the last in 1954 after the conflict had ended. Cayuga was part of this initial first dispatch of three ships by Canada to Korea, departing Esquimalt on 5 July 1950. In 1952, Cayuga was reconstructed as a destroyer escort and given the new hull number 218. It was on this vessel that Ferdinand Demara, "the great impostor", served while impersonating a Canadian medical officer.

After the Korean War, Cayuga served as a training ship on the west coast. On 1 January 1955, Cayuga was assigned to the Second Canadian Escort Squadron. The initial commanding officer of the group was Commander Henry H. Davidson, captain of Cayuga. In November 1955, the Second Canadian Escort Squadron was among the Canadian units that took part in one of the largest naval exercises since the Second World War off the coast of California. In January 1959 she transferred back to Halifax. There the destroyer escort served as a training ship until being paid off on 27 February 1964. The destroyer was sold for scrap and broken up at Faslane, Scotland in 1965.

== RCSCC Cayuga ==
In 1954 the 30th Royal Canadian Sea Cadet Corps, RCSCC Exeter, was renamed after HMCS Cayuga and renumbered 140, and continues to operate to this day, on CFB Wainwright, Alberta. RCSCC Cayuga is approximately 25 strong. The corps shares the same motto and badge as its namesake.

== Badge ==
The badge of HMCS Cayuga. Note the nameplate and maple leaves

The badge of RCSCC Cayuga. Ships Badges as used by RCSCCs are called Corps Crests

The Ship's badge is blazoned Or, an Indian of the Cayuga tribe, facing dexter, in kneeling posture, right knee on the ground, left leg bent and forward, two feathers in hair, lower part of body clad, upper bare, a quiver of arrows pendant from the left shoulder, the base resting on ground beside the right knee, the Indian holding a bow and arrow in the "ready" position all gules. When used to represent HMCS Cayuga, the name plate is in the livery colours, i.e. red with gold lettering, but when used to represent the RCSCC, it uses a gold nameplate with black lettering. The naval version has gold maple leaves at the base, but the cadet version has red leaves.

== See also ==
- List of ships of the Royal Canadian Navy
