= HMCS Sioux =

Destroyer of the Royal Canadian Navy

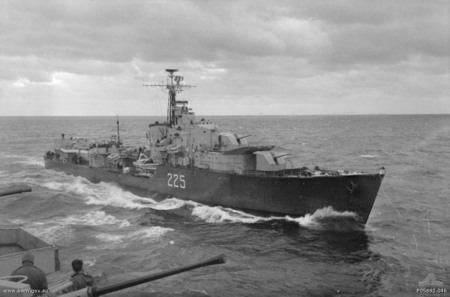
- HMCS Sioux circa. August 1951 – February 1952, probably in Korean waters

History

United Kingdom
- Name: Vixen
- Ordered: 1 September 1941
- Builder: J. Samuel White, Cowes
- Laid down: 31 October 1942
- Launched: 14 September 1943
- Fate: Transferred to the Royal Canadian Navy 1944

Canada
- Name: Sioux
- Namesake: Sioux people
- Commissioned: 21 February 1944
- Decommissioned: 27 February 1946
- Identification: Pennant number: R64 Later DDE 225
- Recommissioned: 1950
- Decommissioned: 30 October 1963
- Motto: Then I will fight
- Honours and awards: Normandy, 1944; Arctic, 1944–1945; Atlantic, 1945; Korea, 1950–1952
- Fate: Scrapped at La Spezia, Italy, August 1965
- Notes: Colours: White and vermilion
- Badge: Argent, a Sioux Indian head proper facing the dexter and wearing an appropriate feather head-dress of a Sioux Chief

General characteristics
- Class & type: V-class destroyer
- Displacement: 1,710 tonnes (1,683 long tons)
- Length: 362 ft 10 in (110.59 m)
- Beam: 35 ft 8 in (10.87 m)
- Draught: 11 ft 6 in (3.51 m)
- Propulsion: 2 × Admiralty 3-drum water-tube boilers; Geared steam turbines, 40,000 shp (29,828 kW); 2 shafts
- Speed: 36 knots (41 mph; 67 km/h)
- Range: 4,860 nmi (9,000 km) at 29 kn (54 km/h)
- Complement: 230 (14 officers)
- Armament: 4 × QF 4.7-inch (120-mm) Mk IX guns (2×2); 6 × QF 20 mm Oerlikon guns (2×2, 2×1); 4 × 21 inch (533 mm) torpedo tubes; 2 × Squid triple ASW mortars

HMCS Sioux was a V-class destroyer of the Royal Canadian Navy which fought in the Second World War and the Korean War. She was launched as HMS Vixen for the British Royal Navy before being transferred to the Royal Canadian Navy. She was then named for the Sioux people of Canada's western provinces.

== Construction and career ==
Vixen was ordered on 1 September 1941 as part of the 1941 shipbuilding programme. The destroyer's keel was laid down on 31 October 1942 by J. Samuel White at Cowes. The ship was launched on 14 September 1943. As part of the Warship Week in January 1942 Vixen was adopted by the town of Kirkcaldy, Fife. The destroyer was transferred to the Royal Canadian Navy, into which she was then commissioned and renamed on 21 February 1944 while fitting out at Cowes, and was completed on 5 March 1944.

After commissioning Sioux joined the 26th Destroyer Flotilla of the British Home Fleet at Scapa Flow. The Home Fleet deployed on 29 March 1944 as part of the covering force for convoy JW 58 sailing to Russia. On 3 April, Sioux escorted the aircraft carriers that attacked the Tirpitz, which was anchored at Altenfjord, Norway, and German shipping along the Norwegian coast as part of Operation Tungsten. On 26 April, the destroyer was part of the screening force for strikes on German shipping off the coast of Norway and returned again in early May for more screening duties.

=== Invasion of Normandy ===
On 15 May, the 26th Destroyer Flotilla began training exercises in anticipation for its participation in Operation Neptune. On 28 May Sioux sailed to Portsmouth as part of Canada's contribution to the Invasion of Normandy. During the assault on Juno Beach, Sioux bombarded shore batteries for forty minutes during the initial landing and provided fire support afterwards. On 10–11 June, Sioux and the Polish destroyer Krakowiak were sent to intercept a German flotilla of schnellboots laying mines off Le Havre. The two destroyers failed to intercept the Germans. On 23 June, the ship bombarded enemy troop concentrations near the mouth of the River Orne and a battery of field guns. The following day, Sioux and sister ship Algonquin attacked a German battery near Franceville, which was to be their last mission off the coast of Normandy. She remained with the invasion force until July when she returned to Scapa Flow.

=== Northern operations ===
After returning from operations in the Normandy area, Sioux rejoined the Home Fleet. In August 1944, Algonquin and Sioux were among the escorts for a carrier force sent to attack German airfields at Gossen, Norway and to carry out attacks on Tirpitz. In September, Sioux escorted a force that performed attacks on German shipping off Norway. Upon returning from that, Sioux sailed with a convoy sailing for Russia. On the return trip two merchant vessels were torpedoed. On 14–15 October, Sioux escorted a force that was sent to perform air-mining and attacks on Axis shipping routes along the coast of Norway near Frohavet. The destroyer returned to Norwegian waters from 26–28 October, escorting the aircraft carrier Implacable which attacked targets in Norway as part of Operation Athletic. In early November the destroyer was laid up undergoing a boiler cleaning. Sioux returned with Implacable for more attacks along the coast of Norway in late November.

After returning to Scapa Flow, Sioux escorted four convoys to the Soviet Union and back. From 7–14 December, the destroyer was among the escorts for a carrier force that sortied in support of the convoy RA 62. On 30 December, the destroyer departed Loch Ewe as one of the escorts for convoy JW 63, arriving at Kola Inlet on 8 January 1945. Sioux returned to Loch Ewe on 21 January escorting convoy RA 63. During transit the convoy passed through a storm whose gales reached 85 knots (157 km/h; 98 mph). The convoy fell apart and Sioux was sent to round up any straggling merchantmen. Sioux helped rescue crew from one disabled merchant and was then sent to search for three more disabled merchant vessels. The destroyer recovered the ships and brought all of them into the Faroes. On 6 February, she left Loch Ewe with convoy JW 64. The convoy came under combined U-boat and air attack after being spotted by reconnaissance aircraft. The convoy arrived at its destination on 13 February, losing one corvette in exchange for 13 German aircraft.

After escorting convoy JW 64 to Polyarnoe, Sioux departed on 14 February as part of a relief expedition to convey 500 inhabitants of the Norwegian island of Sørøya, left without food or fishing boats by the Germans, to safety. The expedition also involved HMS Zambesi, HMS Zest and HMS Zealous. The inhabitants were dispersed among the ships of the next convoy, RA 64 for transit to the United Kingdom. Sioux joined the escort of the convoy on 17 February. RA 64 came under combined U-boat and air attack during its passage. Two freighters and one escort were sunk, another escort was severely damaged in exchange for six German aircraft shot down. Sioux left the escort on 27 February.

On 12 March, Sioux joined the escort of convoy JW 65, which came under combined attack by U-boats and aircraft on 20 March. The convoy lost one freighter and one escort sunk and one merchant vessel severely damaged. The destroyer returned to the United Kingdom with convoy RA 65 on 31 March.

=== End of war ===
Sioux sailed to Halifax on 6 April, to prepare for transfer to the British Pacific Fleet and operations against Japan. The vessel underwent a major refit at Halifax and in November 1945 transferred to the west coast, being paid off on 27 February 1946 at Esquimalt.

Sioux emerged, fully modernized, in 1950. As part of the modernization, she lost turrets 'X' and 'Y', which were replaced by two Squid anti-submarine mortars. She was also the first Canadian warship to be fitted with bunks instead of hammocks. In March 1950, with the cruiser Ontario and destroyer Cayuga, Sioux participated in a training cruise to Mexico, making several port visits.

=== Korean War first tour ===
After the declaration of war in Korea, Canada ordered three destroyers of the Pacific Division based at CFB Esquimalt to begin preparations for deployment to the Korean theatre. Sioux was in dry dock and not expected to leave it until 30 June 1950. However, after a massive effort by the dockside crews, Sioux departed with Cayuga and Athabaskan on 5 July 1950. The three vessels arrived at Sasebo on 30 July 1950. After arriving, the destroyer was assigned to Task Force 96.5 with Athabaskan escorting convoys of ships from Japan to Pusan. Initially retained at Sasebo for rescue missions, on 12 August 1950, the ship transferred to Task Unit 96.53.3 assigned to the west coast of Korea.

After transiting, Sioux was ordered to bombard Popusompu (now a part of Beopseong-Myeon) on 20 August. At the end of the month the destroyer bombarded the island of Te bu Somu with HMS Kenya and Cayuga. She helped provide naval support for the troops that landed at Inchon in September 1950 as part of Task Force 91.2, charged with escorting the logistic support group and enforcing the naval blockade. Along with several US and British cruisers and destroyers, Sioux, along with Cayuga and Athabaskan, bombarded the amphibious landing area at Wolmido Island just prior to the landing of troops.

On 20 October 1950, Sioux joined Task Group 95.1 under the new command setup. She remained as part of the unit until her departure later in the year. The destroyer worked as part of the blockade force on the west coast until the end of the month before returning to Sasebo. She left Sasebo on 5 November 1950 for a visit to Hong Kong. However, en route the vessel encountered Typhoon Clara and suffered slight damage that required repairs upon her arrival. Upon the destroyer's return from Hong Kong she began blockade duties in coastal waters around Inchon and the mouth of the Yalu River, as part of Task Element 95.12 alongside the other Canadian vessels.

With the absence of the British cruisers, the destroyers of Task Element 95.12 were ordered on 3 December 1950 to cover the withdrawal of units from Chinnampo by escorting the transports into the harbour and providing gunfire support during their withdrawal. Reports claiming an emergency arrived from the harbour and the destroyers were forced to sail down the swept channel at night. While making her way up the channel, Sioux ran aground. Able to get herself clear, the destroyer then fouled her starboard screw, forcing her to retire. She and HMAS Warramunga provided a covering force for the withdrawal the next day.

Sioux then spent the rest of her time in theatre screening the aircraft carrier, HMS Theseus, escorting shipping, blockade patrol and providing general support for the forces evacuating Inchon. The destroyer returned to Sasebo on 2 January 1951 and spent two weeks preparing before returning home, departing 15 January 1951. She was replaced on station by HMCS Nootka.

Sioux performed two more tours of duty in the Korean War and was the last Canadian ship to depart Korean waters.

=== Training and conversion ===
In 1953 Sioux was one of a number of Royal Canadian Navy ships which took part in the Fleet Review to celebrate the Coronation of Queen Elizabeth II. She was primarily used for training purposes thereafter, until being paid off on 30 October 1963. The destroyer wore pennant 225 from 1949 until 1963. In November 1959, Sioux was converted to a frigate with two 4.7-inch guns, four torpedo tubes and two Squid launchers. She was towed to La Spezia, Italy and broken up there in 1965.

== Ship's bell ==
The Chatham and Area Royal Canadian Naval Association branch acquired HMCS Sioux's ship's bell, which was used for baptism of babies on board ship. The names of 48 children christened aboard the V-class destroyer are inscribed on the bell.

== See also ==
- List of ships of the Canadian Navy

== Publications ==
- Arbuckle, J. Graeme (1987). Badges of the Canadian Navy. Halifax, Nova Scotia: Nimbus Publishing. ISBN 0-920852-49-1.
- Boutiller, James A., ed. (1982). RCN in Retrospect, 1910–1968. Vancouver: University of British Columbia Press. ISBN 0-7748-0196-4.
- Colledge, J. J.; Warlow, Ben (2006) [1969]. Ships of the Royal Navy: The Complete Record of All Fighting Ships of the Royal Navy from the 15th Century to the Present (3rd Rev ed.). London: Chatham Publishing. ISBN 978-1-86176-281-8. OCLC 67375475.
- Gimblett, Richard H., ed. (2009). The Naval Service of Canada 1910–2010: The Centennial Story. Toronto: Dundurn Press. ISBN 978-1-55488-470-4.
- Macpherson, Ken; Barrie, Ron (2002). The Ships of Canada's Naval Forces, 1910-2002 (3 ed.). St. Catharines, Ontario: Vanwell Publishing Limited. ISBN 1551250721.
- Raven, Alan; Roberts, John (1978). War Built Destroyers O to Z Classes. London: Bivouac Books. ISBN 0-85680-010-4.
- Rohwer, Jürgen (2005). Chronology of the War at Sea 1939–1945: The Naval History of World War Two (Revised & Expanded ed.). Annapolis, Maryland: Naval Institute Press. ISBN 1-59114-119-2.
- Schull, Joseph (1961). The Far Distant Ships: An Official Account of Canadian Naval Operations in the Second World War. Ottawa: Queen's Printer.
- Thorgrimsson, Thor; Russell, E.C. (1965). Canadian Naval Operations In Korean Waters 1950 – 1955. Ottawa: National Defence and the Canadian Armed Forces.
- Whitley, M. J. (1988). Destroyers of World War 2. Annapolis, Maryland: Naval Institute Press. ISBN 0-87021-326-1.
