= HMCS Athabaskan (R79) =

Destroyer of the Royal Canadian Navy

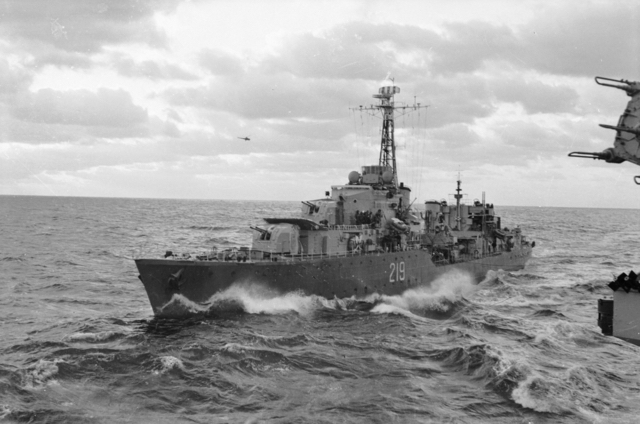
- HMCS Athabaskan circa. August 1951 – February 1952, probably in Korean waters.

History

Canada
- Name: Athabaskan
- Namesake: HMCS Athabaskan (G07)
- Ordered: April 1942
- Builder: Halifax Shipyards, Halifax, Nova Scotia
- Laid down: 15 May 1943
- Launched: 4 May 1946
- Commissioned: 20 January 1948
- Recommissioned: 25 October 1954
- Decommissioned: 21 April 1966
- Identification: Pennant number: R79; later DDE 219
- Motto: "We Fight as One"
- Nickname(s): Athabaskan II
- Honours and awards: Korea 1950
- Fate: Sold for scrapping 1969

General characteristics
- Class & type: Tribal-class destroyer
- Displacement: 1,850 tons (standard), 2,520 tons (full)
- Length: 377 ft (114.9 m)
- Beam: 37.5 ft (11.4 m)
- Draught: 9 ft (2.7 m)
- Propulsion: 3 × Admiralty 3-drum boilers, steam turbines, 2 shafts, 44,000 shp
- Speed: 36 knots (67 km/h)
- Range: 5,700 nautical miles (10,600 km) at 15 knots (28 km/h); 524 tons oil
- Complement: 190 (219 as leader)
- Armament: 8 – 4 in L/45 QF Mk.XVI guns, 4 × twin mounting HA Mk.XIX; 1 × twin 40 mm Bofors mount Mk.V; 4 × single 40 mm Bofors mount Mk.III; 1 × tubes for 21 in (533 mm) torpedoes Mk.IX; 1 × rack, 2 × throwers for depth charges

HMCS Athabaskan was a Tribal-class destroyer that served with the Royal Canadian Navy in the immediate post-Second World War era. She was the second destroyer to bear the name "Athabaskan", after the many tribes throughout western Canada that speak Athabaskan family languages. Both this ship and the original HMCS Athabaskan were destroyers and thus this vessel became known as Athabaskan II or "Athabee".

Having missed action within the North Atlantic, Athabaskan II served in the Korean War and played an important role in Canadian post-war naval reform following a crew protest in 1949.

== Construction and career ==
Athabaskan was ordered in April 1942. She was laid down 15 May 1943 at Halifax Shipyards and launched 4 May 1946. She was one of four Tribal-class destroyers built in Halifax during the Second World War. She was commissioned into the Royal Canadian Navy on 20 January 1948 at Halifax.

After commissioning, Athabaskan sailed for the west coast to begin her career as a training ship. She performed this task until the outbreak of the Korean War. It was during this period that the mutiny took place.

=== 1949 'mutiny' ===
On 26 February 1949, when the Athabaskan was on fueling stop at Manzanillo, Colima, Mexico, ninety leading seamen and below – constituting more than half the ship's company – locked themselves in their messdecks, and refused to come out until getting the captain to hear their grievances.

The captain acted with great sensitivity to defuse the crisis, entering the mess for an informal discussion of the sailors' grievances and carefully avoiding using the term "mutiny" which could have had severe legal consequences for the sailors involved. Specifically, while talking with the disgruntled crew members, the captain is known to have placed his cap over a written list of demands which could have been used as legal evidence of a mutiny, pretending not to notice it. Years later, one of her crew suggested that one specific grievance involved the lack of rum rations, a tradition which continued until 1970.

At nearly the same time, similar incidents happened on HMCS Crescent at Nanjing, China, and on the carrier HMCS Magnificent in the Caribbean, both of whose captains acted similarly to that of the Athabaskan.

=== Korean War ===
Athabaskan served three tours of duty during the Korean War, departing from Esquimalt for her first on 5 July 1950 and returning from her third on 11 December 1953. Joining the UN forces, she participated in patrols, anti-submarine protection, ship escorts, and assisted in capturing ports, transporting troops, evacuation, and bombardments. As a result of her actions, she earned the battle honour "Korea 1950–53"

=== Post Korean War ===
Following Korea, Athabaskan underwent a major refit, recommissioning on 25 October 1954 as a destroyer escort. On 1 January 1955, Athabaskan was assigned to the Second Canadian Escort Squadron of Pacific Command. While on a training cruise with HCMS Cayuga, the 16-year-old female stowaway Joan Pilapil was discovered on 7 August 1955. In November 1955, the Second Canadian Escort Squadron was among the Canadian units that took part in one of the largest naval exercises since the Second World War off the coast of California.

In January 1959, Athabaskan left for the east coast to become part of a Tribal-class squadron. She was battered by a major storm during a NATO training exercise in November and December 1959. The Athabaskan was damaged by a collision with HMCS Bonaventure in 1963.

One of her final actions was rescuing the crew of a Liberian tanker Amphialos, which had broken up and sank 40 kilometres off of Liverpool. Athabaskan was placed in reserve in 1964 at Halifax.

== Decommissioning and fate ==
Athabaskan was paid off for disposal on 21 April 1966. She was sold in 1969 and scrapped in 1970 at La Spezia, Italy.
