= Ilford Animal Cemetery =

Animal cemetery in London

Coordinates: 51°35′15″N 0°2′45″E

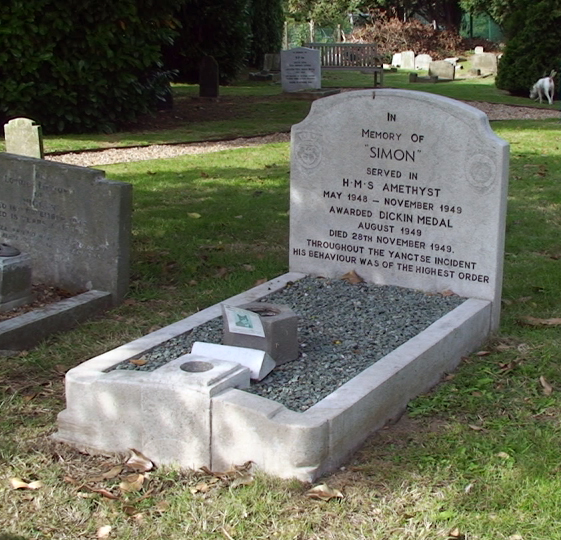
The grave of Able Seacat Simon

Ilford Animal Cemetery is an animal cemetery in Ilford in London, England, United Kingdom that contains over three thousand burials. It was founded in the 1920s and is operated by the People's Dispensary for Sick Animals. The cemetery was closed to new burials in the 1960s and gradually became neglected and overgrown before a £50,000 grant from the National Lottery led to its reopening.

== Activities ==
The burials are a mixture of family pets and military animals, including thirteen recipients of the Dickin Medal for bravery (a fifth of all Dickin Medal recipients are buried at Ilford). The first Dickin Medal recipient to be buried at Ilford was Rip, a Second World War search and rescue dog. Information boards recounting the stories of several of the animals were constructed during the recent restoration.

The cemetery has an area specifically dedicated to bird burials. It also has a Pet Tribute Garden designed by celebrity gardener Bob Flowerdew. The inspiration for the design was the Dickin Medal, which has stripes of brown, blue and green representing sea, land and air forces.

== British pet massacre ==
At the beginning of World War II over 750,000 pets were killed in Britain due to fears of food shortages. As many as 500,000 were buried in a meadow that became part of the animal cemetery.

== Reopening ==
In the early twenty-first century it was restored with the assistance of a £50,000 grant from the National Lottery. Headstones were repaired or replaced, the entrance gate was repaired, the graves were numbered and a visitor's map was created. The cemetery re-opened in 2007 with a ceremony that included a performance of the Last Post by a bugler from the King's Royal Rifle Corps and a pigeon fly-past (although the birds actually took fright at the assembled crowd and flew in the opposite direction). It was attended by two holders of the PDSA Gold Medal, Jake (an explosives detection dog) and Endal (an assistance dog). Also present was Commander Stuart Hett, who had been an officer aboard HMS Amethyst and had been tasked with responding to the many letters received by the ship's heroic cat, Simon, who is buried at Ilford.

== Endal ==
The garden includes a pet tribute tag dedicated to Endal, the assistance dog which was present at the re-opening ceremony but which died in 2009. The cemetery is behind the PDSA on Woodford Bridge Road, Redbridge, Ilford, Essex.

== Dickin Medal interments ==
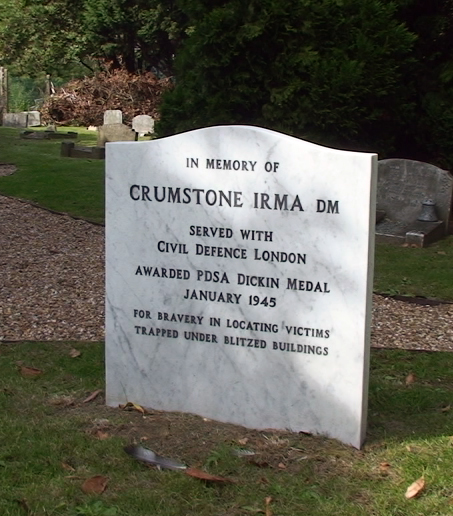
The grave of Crumstone Irma

Dickin Medal recipients buried at Ilford include:

- Antis
- Endal
- Beauty
- Crumstone Irma
- Mary of Exeter
- Peter
- Rex
- Ricky
- Rip
- Able Seacat Simon
- Tich
- Tyke
