= HMS Teazer (R23) =

T-class destroyer converted to Type 16 frigate of the Royal Navy

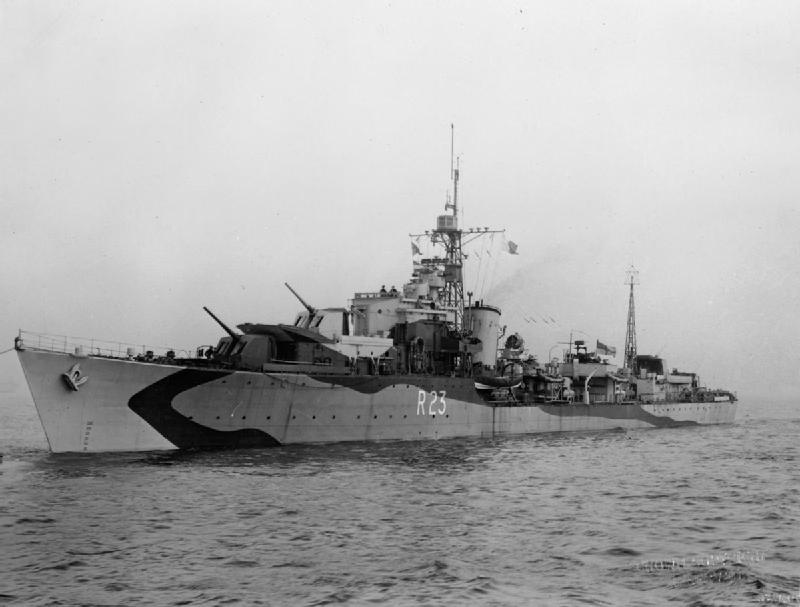
- HMS Teazer in September 1943

History

United Kingdom
- Name: HMS Teazer
- Ordered: March 1941
- Builder: Cammell Laird
- Yard number: 1099
- Laid down: 20 October 1941
- Launched: 7 January 1943
- Commissioned: 13 September 1943
- Reclassified: Converted to Type 16 frigate 1952
- Identification: Pennant number: R23 (F23 after 1954)
- Honours and awards: Mediterranean 1943; Adriatic 1944; South France 1944; Aegean 1944
- Fate: Scrapped 7 August 1965

General characteristics as T–class
- Class & type: T-class destroyer
- Displacement: 1,710 long tons (1,737 t) - 1,730 long tons (1,758 t) (standard nominal); 1,780 long tons (1,809 t) - 1,810 long tons (1,839 t) (actual); 2,505 long tons (2,545 t) - 2,545 long tons (2,586 t) (deep load)
- Length: 339 ft 6 in (103.48 m) pp; 362 ft 9 in (110.57 m) oa
- Beam: 35 ft 8 in (10.87 m)
- Draught: 14 ft 2 in (4.32 m)
- Propulsion: 2 shaft Parsons geared turbines; 2 Admiralty 3-drum boilers; 40,000 shp (30,000 kW)
- Speed: 36.75 knots (42.29 mph; 68.06 km/h)
- Complement: 180-225
- Armament: 4 × 4.7-inch (120-mm) QF Mk IX guns (4×1); 2 × 40mm Bofors (1x2); 8 × 20 mm guns anti-aircraft guns; 8 × 21-inch (533 mm) torpedo tubes (2×4)

General characteristics as Type 16
- Class & type: Type 16 frigate
- Displacement: 1,800 long tons (1,800 t) standard; 2,300 long tons (2,300 t) full load
- Length: 362 ft 9 in (110.57 m) o/a
- Beam: 37 ft 9 in (11.51 m)
- Draught: 14 ft 6 in (4.42 m)
- Propulsion: 2 × Admiralty 3-drum boilers; Steam turbines, 40,000 shp; 2 shafts
- Speed: 32 knots (37 mph; 59 km/h) full load
- Complement: 175
- Sensors & processing systems: Type 293Q target indication Radar; Type 974 navigation Radar; Type 1010 Cossor Mark 10 IFF; Type 146B search Sonar; Type 147 depth finder Sonar; Type 162 target classification Sonar; Type 174 attack Sonar
- Armament: 1 × twin 4 in gun Mark 19; 1 × twin 40 mm Bofors gun Mk.5; 5 × single 40 mm Bofors gun Mk.9; 2 × Squid A/S mortar; 1 × quad 21 in (533 mm) tubes for Mk.9 torpedoes

HMS Teazer was a T-class destroyer of the Royal Navy that saw service during the Second World War. She was later converted to a Type 16 fast anti-submarine frigate, with the new pennant number F23.

== Service history ==
=== Wartime service ===
During September 1943, Teazer underwent builder's trials before being commissioned. Upon commissioning, she was accepted into the 24th Destroyer Flotilla. Upon deployment with the flotilla, Teazer underwent working up exercises in Scapa Flow before sailing for the Mediterranean theatre, where, in November, she supported ground operations by the British X Corps in the Minturno sector.

In July 1944, she was placed under U.S. Navy command and was one of the ships scheduled to support the landing in the South of France as part of Operation Dragoon.

During the Allied withdrawal form the Aegean Sea in 1944, Teazer was responsible for the sinking of the transport ship KT Erpel and the submarine chaser UJ2171 off Cape Spatha.

In May 1945, following a refit in January and February, she was assigned to Task Force 57 and then Task Force 37 in the Pacific and was responsible for providing an escort screen to the large Royal Navy carriers used in raids on the Japanese Home Islands.

With the surrender of the Japanese, she was present at the surrender ceremony on 27 August 1945 in Tokyo Bay.

=== Postwar service ===
Between 1946 and 1953, Teazer was held in reserve at Devonport. Between 1953 and 1954, she was converted into a Type 16 fast anti-submarine frigate, by Mountstuart Dry Docks, Cardiff, with the new pennant number F23 In January 1959, she replaced Grenville in the 2nd Training Squadron.

=== Decommissioning and disposal ===
Following decommissioning, Teazer was placed on the disposal list in September 1961. She was subsequently sold to Arnott Young, Dalmuir, for scrapping, arriving there on 7 August 1965.

== In popular culture ==
In 1957, Teazer was used during the making of the film Yangtse Incident. She depicted both HMS Consort and HMS Concord.

Doctor Who companion, Ben Jackson, was assigned to Teazer, as shown on his uniform cap. Within the "Whoniverse", Teazer was still in service in 1966. In July that year, she had recently left England, bound for the West Indies, leaving Jackson seconded to a shore posting and very disappointed.

== Publications ==
- Colledge, J. J.; Warlow, Ben (2006) [1969]. Ships of the Royal Navy: The Complete Record of All Fighting Ships of the Royal Navy from the 15th Century to the Present (3rd Rev ed.). London: Chatham Publishing. ISBN 978-1-86176-281-8. OCLC 67375475.
- Critchley, Mike (1982). British Warships Since 1945: Part 3: Destroyers. Liskeard, UK: Maritime Books. ISBN 0-9506323-9-2.
- Raven, Alan; Roberts, John (1978). War Built Destroyers O to Z Classes. London: Bivouac Books. ISBN 0-85680-010-4.
- Whitley, M. J. (1988). Destroyers of World War 2. Annapolis, Maryland: Naval Institute Press. ISBN 0-87021-326-1.
