= Simon (cat) =

Ship's cat on HMS Amethyst

- Simon in quarantine, November 1949
- Species: Felis catus
- Sex: Male
- Born: c. 1947; Hong Kong
- Died: 28 November 1949 (aged 2); Surrey, England
- Resting place: Plot 281 of the PDSA's pet cemetery in Ilford, Essex, England
- Occupation: Ship's cat of HMS Amethyst, honorary 'Able Seacat'
- Employer: Royal Navy
- Known for: Received several medals due to exemplary conduct in the Yangtze incident
- Awards: Dickin Medal; Naval General Service Medal

Simon (c. 1947 – 28 November 1949) was a ship's cat who served on the Royal Navy sloop-of-war HMS Amethyst. In 1949, during the Yangtze Incident, he received the PDSA's Dickin Medal after surviving injuries from an artillery shell, raising morale, and killing off a rat infestation during his service.

== Origin ==
Simon was found wandering the dockyards of Hong Kong in March 1948 by 17-year-old ordinary seaman George Hickinbottom, a member of the crew of the British sloop HMS Amethyst stationed in the city in the late 1940s. At this stage, it is thought Simon was approximately a year old, and was very undernourished and unwell. Hickinbottom smuggled the cat aboard ship, and Simon soon ingratiated himself with the crew and officers, particularly because he was adept at catching and killing rats on the lower decks. Simon rapidly gained a reputation for cheekiness, leaving presents of dead rats in sailors' beds, and sleeping in the captain's cap.

The crew viewed Simon as a lucky mascot, and when the ship's commander changed later in 1948, the outgoing Ian Griffiths left the cat for his successor, Lieutenant Commander Bernard Skinner, who took an immediate liking to the friendly animal. However, Skinner's first mission in command of the Amethyst was to travel up the Yangtze River to Nanjing to replace the duty ship there, HMS Consort. Halfway up the river the ship became embroiled in the Amethyst Incident, when a Chinese PLA field gun battery opened fire on the frigate. One of the first rounds tore through the captain's cabin, seriously wounding Simon. Lieutenant Commander Skinner died of his wounds soon after the attack.

== Recovery ==
The badly wounded cat crawled on deck, and was rushed to the medical bay, where the ship's surviving medical staff cleaned his burns, and removed four pieces of shrapnel, but he was not expected to last the night. He managed to survive, however, and after a period of recovery, returned to his former duties in spite of the indifference he faced from the new captain, Lieutenant Commander John Kerans. While anchored in the river, the ship had become overrun with rats, and Simon took on the task of removing them with vigour, as well as raising the morale of the sailors.

Following the ship's escape from the Yangtze, Simon became an instant celebrity, lauded in British and world news, and presented with the "Animal Victoria Cross", the Dickin Medal; as of 2025, Simon is the only cat to win the award. He was also awarded a Blue Cross medal, the Amethyst campaign medal, and the rank of Able Seaman after disposing of a particularly vicious rat nicknamed "Mao Tse-tung" (after the Chinese revolutionary). Thousands of letters were written to him, so many that one Lt. Stewart Hett was appointed "cat officer" to deal with Simon's post. At every port Amethyst stopped at on its route home, Simon was honoured, and a special welcome was made for him at Plymouth in November when the ship returned. Simon was, however, like all animals entering the UK, subject to quarantine regulations, and was immediately sent to an animal centre in Surrey.

== Death ==
Whilst in quarantine, Simon contracted a virus and, despite the attentions of medical staff and thousands of well-wishers, died on 28 November 1949 from a complication of the viral infection caused by his war wounds. Hundreds, including the entire crew of HMS Amethyst, attended his funeral at the PDSA Ilford Animal Cemetery in east London. His gravestone reads:

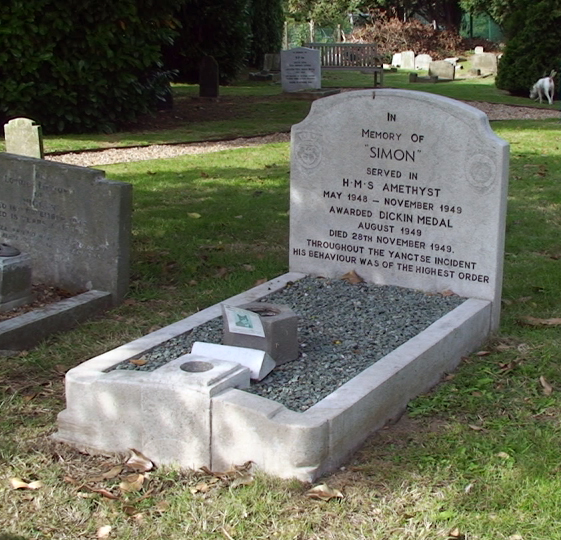
Simon's resting place at the PDSA Animal Cemetery in Ilford

IN
MEMORY OF
"SIMON"
SERVED IN
H.M.S. AMETHYST
MAY 1948 – NOVEMBER 1949
AWARDED DICKIN MEDAL
AUGUST 1949
DIED 28TH NOVEMBER 1949.
THROUGHOUT THE YANGTSE INCIDENT
HIS BEHAVIOUR WAS OF THE HIGHEST ORDER

== Decorations and honours ==
=== Medals ===

| PDSA Dickin Medal | Blue Cross Medal | Naval General Service Medal with Yangtze 1949 clasp |

The following citation accompanied the Amethyst campaign ribbon:

[For] distinguished and meritorious service... single-handedly and unarmed stalk down and destroy "Mao Tse-tung" a rat guilty of raiding food supplies which were critically short. Be it further known that from April 22 to August 4, you did rid HMS Amethyst of pestilence and vermin, with unrelenting faithfulness.

=== Honours ===
Simon is also commemorated with a bush planted in his honour in the Yangtze Incident Grove at the National Memorial Arboretum in Staffordshire.

In 1950, the writer Paul Gallico dedicated his novel Jennie to Simon.

== See also ==
- List of individual cats
- Military animal
- Unsinkable Sam – a cat who served with the German navy in World War II
