= Tich =

Tich may refer to:

== English cricketers ==
- Tich Cornford (1900–1964), Sussex cricketer
- Tich Freeman (1888–1965), Kent cricketer
- Tom Richmond (cricketer) (1890–1957), Nottinghamshire cricketer

== Entertainers ==
- Ian "Tich" Amey of Dave Dee, Dozy, Beaky, Mick & Tich, British 1960s pop group
- Michael "Tich" Anderson, drummer of the early 1980s Scottish band Altered Images
- Anthony "Tich" Critchlow, drummer of the late 1980s band Living in a Box
- Tich Gwilym (1951–2005), Welsh rock guitarist
- Little Tich (1867–1928), English music hall comedian
- Tich (singer) (born 1994), English singer

== TICH ==
- Tropical Institute of Community Health and Development - see Great Lakes University of Kisumu, Kenya
- Tayside Institute of Child Health, associated with Ninewells Hospital in Dundee, Scotland

== Other ==
- Tich McFarlane (1916–2001), Australian air force officer and public servant
- George Palliser (1919–2011), Second World War Royal Air Force flying ace
- George Shorten (born 1901), Australian rules footballer
- Walter Cowan (1871–1956), British admiral in both world wars
- Tich (dog), awarded the Dickin Medal for bravery in World War II
- Tich, a ventriloquist's dummy presented by Ray Alan in Tich and Quackers

== See also ==
- Titch (disambiguation)
