= Naval General Service Medal (1915) =

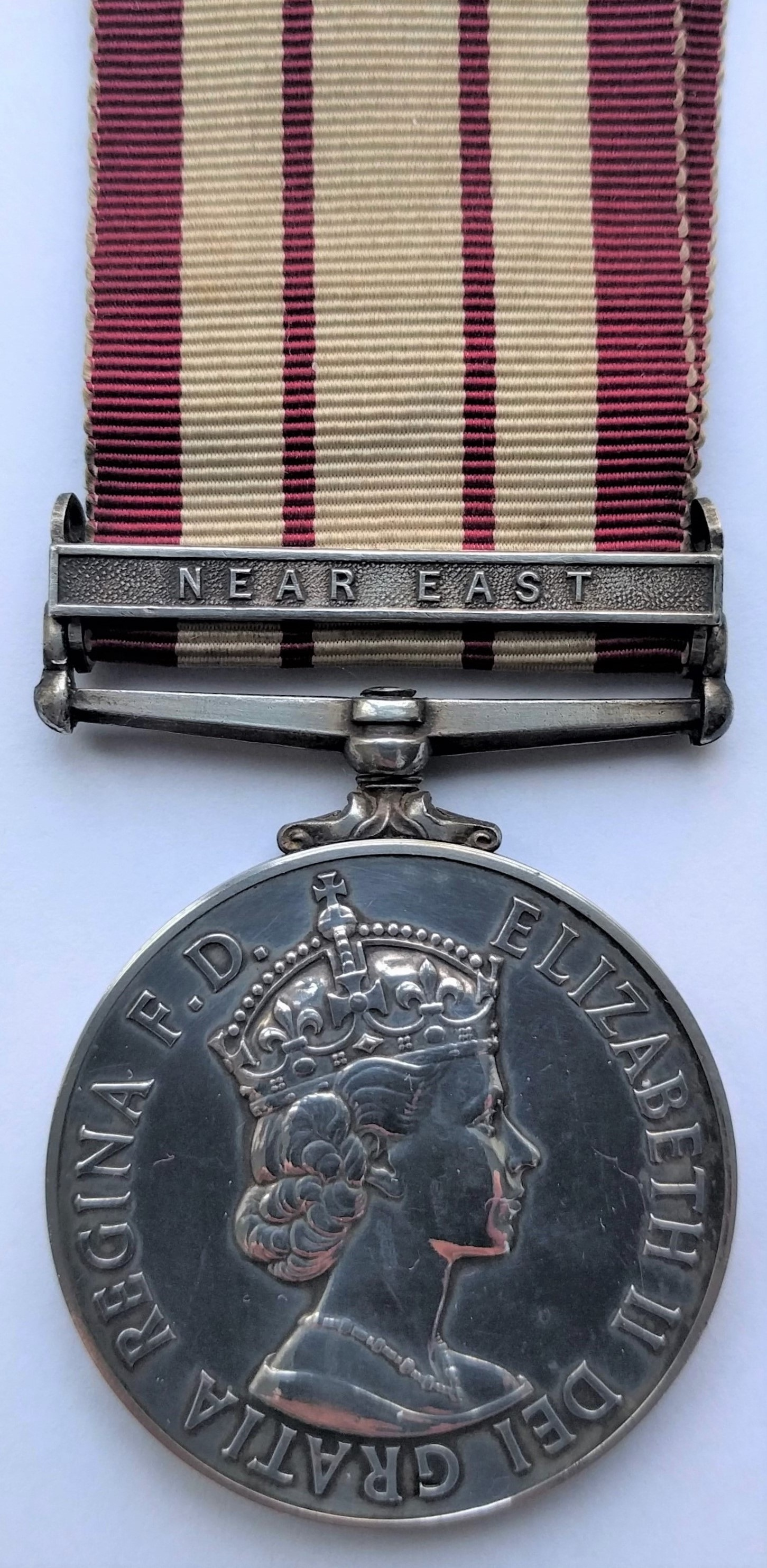
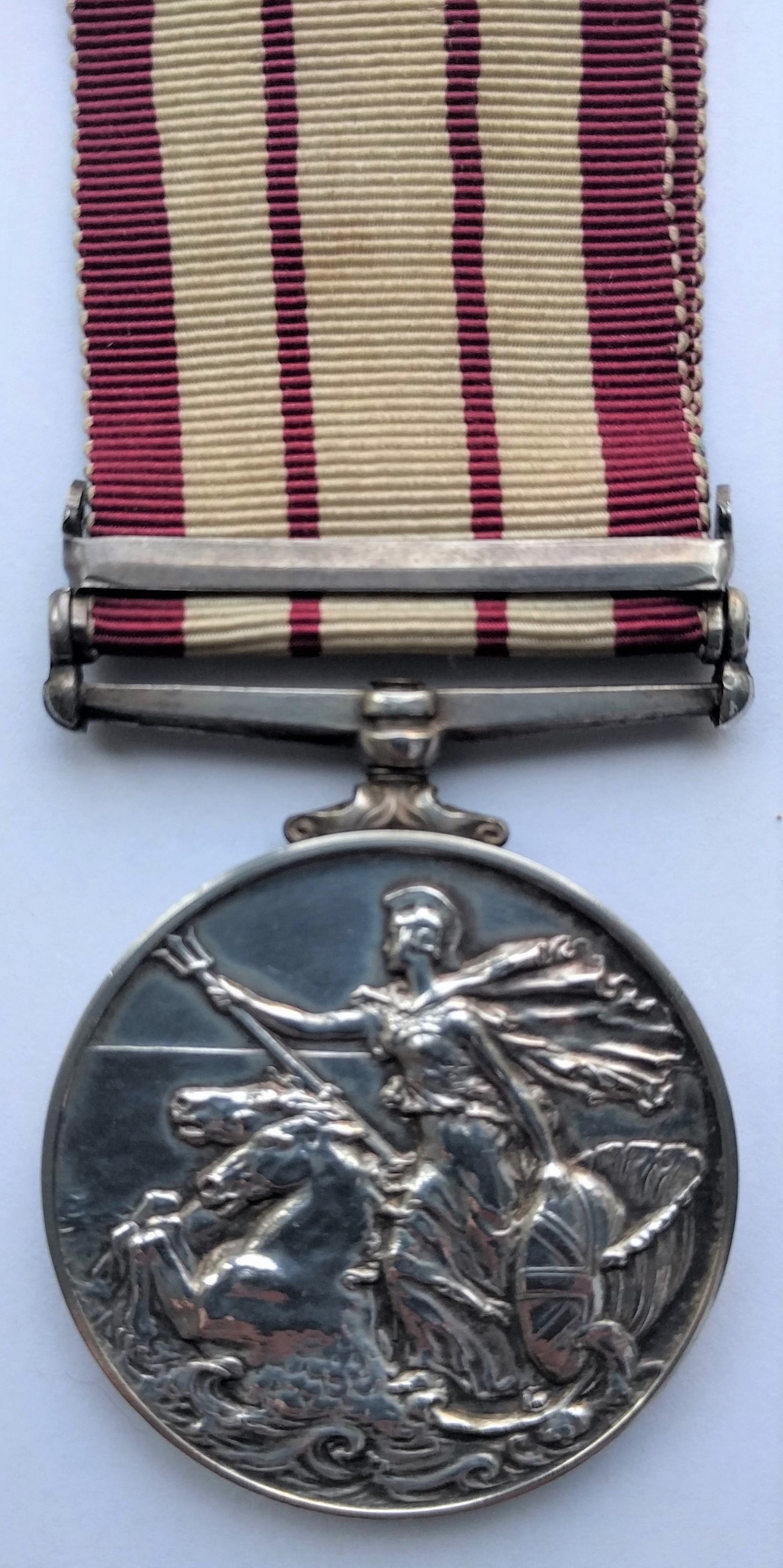
- Obverse and reverse of the medal
- Type: Campaign medal
- Awarded for: Campaign service.
- Description: Silver disk, 36mm diameter
- Presented by: United Kingdom and Commonwealth
- Eligibility: Naval and Marine forces
- Campaign: Minor campaigns 1909–62
- Clasps: 17
- Established: 6 August 1915
- Final award: For service in December 1962
- Ribbon: crimson with three white stripes Ribbon with bronze oak leaf for a mention in despatches (1920 onwards)
- Related: General Service Medal (1918), General Service Medal (1962)

The Naval General Service Medal (1915 NGSM) was instituted in 1915 to recognise service by the Royal Navy and Royal Marines in minor campaigns that would not otherwise earn a specific campaign medal. The Army/Air Force equivalent was the General Service Medal (1918). Both these medals were replaced by the General Service Medal in 1962.

== Description ==
- The medal is silver and is 36 millimetres (1.4 in) in diameter. The obverse bears the image of one of three successive Sovereigns, King George V, King George VI and Queen Elizabeth II.
- The reverse, designed by Margaret Winser, shows a mounted figure of Britannia in a chariot pulled by two sea-horses, her left hand resting on a union shield.
- The name and details of the recipient were impressed on the edge of the medal.
- The 32 millimetres (1.3 in) wide ribbon is crimson-coloured with three white stripes.
- From 1920 a bronze oak leaf emblem is worn on the ribbon of the medal to signify a mention in dispatches for a campaign for which the NGSM was awarded.

=== Obverse variations ===
The medal was awarded with one of five obverse designs:

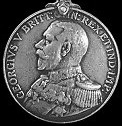
King George V (1915–20)

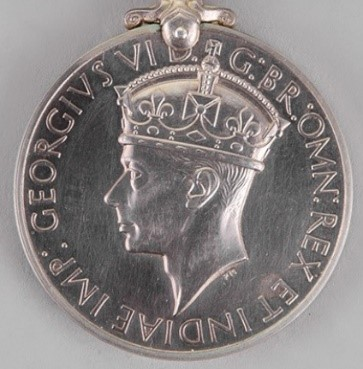
George VI (1st type) 'INDIAE IMP' (1936–49)

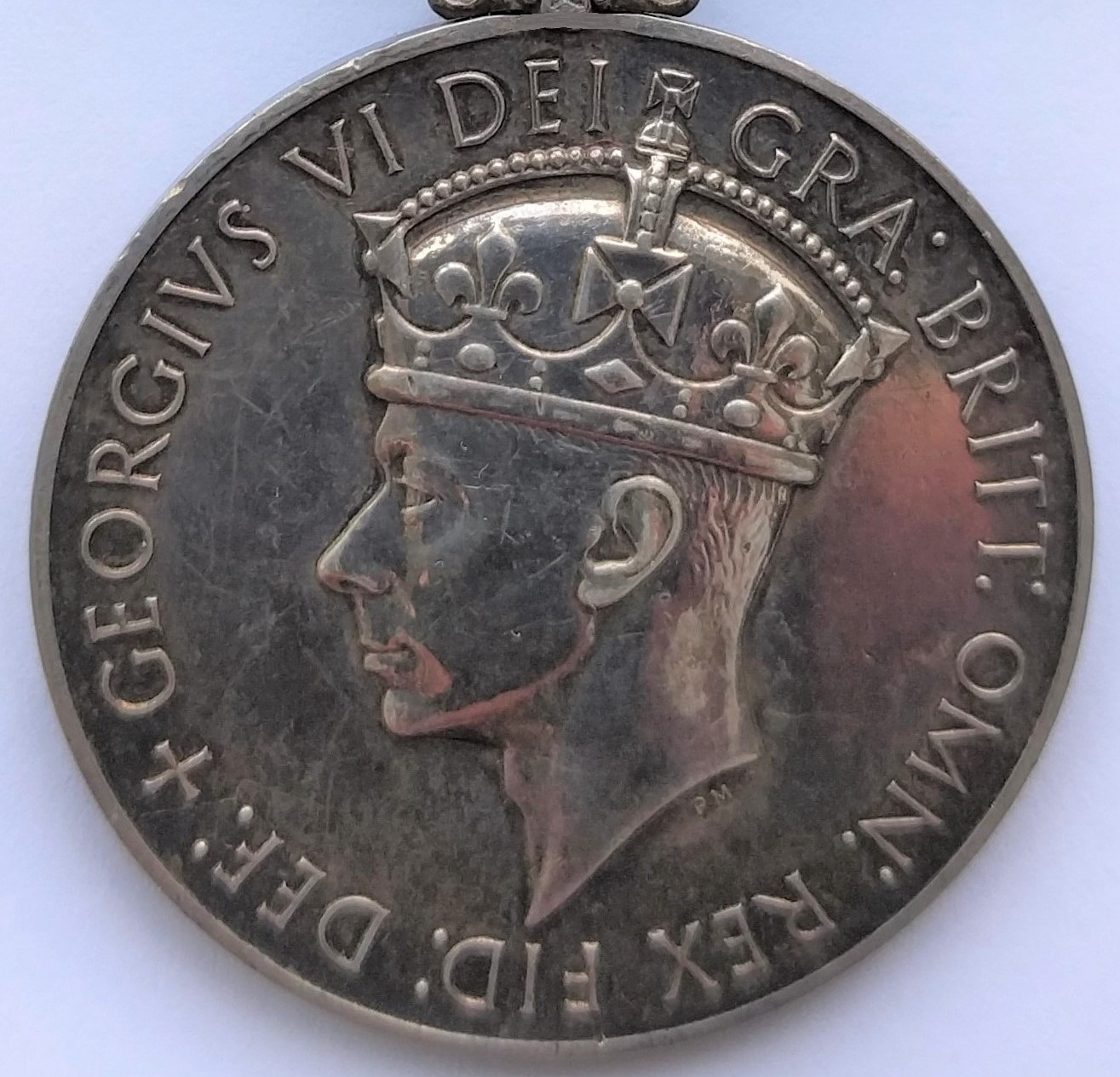
George VI (2nd type) without 'INDIAE IMP' (1949–52)

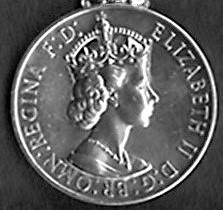
Elizabeth II (1st type) 'BR OMN' (1952–53)

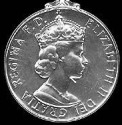
Elizabeth II (2nd type) 'DEI GRATIA' (1953–62)

== Clasps ==
The 1915 NGSM was never awarded without a clasp. The seventeen clasps authorised are listed below, the figures in brackets denoting the number awarded.

- Persian Gulf 1909–1914 (7,164, including 37 to the Indian Army, travelling aboard H.M.S. Pelorus): for operations against pirates, gun-runners and slavers.
- Iraq 1919–1920 (116): for river gunboat service during the Arab revolt.
- N.W. Persia 1920 (4): awarded to the four members of the Naval Mission to the Caspian Sea.
- Palestine 1936–39 (13,600): for service during the uprising by Palestinian Arabs.
- S.E. Asia 1945-46 (2,000): for operations in Java, Sumatra and French Indochina, prior to handover to the pre-war colonial power.
- Minesweeping 1945–51 (4,750): for 6 months minesweeping service in specified areas across the world.
- Palestine 1945–48 (7,900): for service during the post-war Jewish insurgency, including coastal patrols against illegal Jewish immigration.
- Malaya (7,800): for service in Malaya and Singapore between 1948-60 during the state of emergency.
- Yangtze 1949 (1,450): for the attack on HMS Amethyst and other vessels by Communist Chinese forces.
- Bomb and Mine Clearance 1945–46: for operations by the Royal Australian Navy, very few clasps with these dates being awarded.
- Bomb and Mine Clearance 1945–53 (145): for 6 months spent in clearance operations in specified areas across the world.
- B & M Clearance Mediterranean (60): for bomb and mine clearance between 1953-60 by divers, and to seamen who moved recovered bombs, mostly in Valletta harbour.
- Canal Zone: for service in the Suez Canal Zone between October 1951 and October 1954. (Authorised 2003).
- Cyprus (4,300): for operations against EOKA insurgents, 1955–59.
- Near East (17,800): for operations during the Suez Crisis of 1956.
- Arabian Peninsula (1,200): for service against dissidents and cross-border raids between 1957–60.
- Brunei (900): for service in Brunei, North Borneo and Sarawak in December 1962, a large proportion awarded to Royal Marines of 42 Commando.
