= Titch =

Titch can refer to the following:

As a nickname:

- Barclay Bailes (1883–1955), Australian rules footballer
- Arthur Edwards (footballer, born 1915) (1915–2002), Australian rules footballer
- William Horne (footballer) (1885–1930), English goalkeeper for Plymouth Argyle
- Titch Moore (born 1976), South African golfer
- Michael Phelan (hurler) (born 1967), Irish former hurler

Other uses:

- Titch (TV series), a 1990s television series shown on CITV
- Titch, a character in the UK comic strip Ball Boy (Beano)
- Crazy Titch, English grime MC
- Taylor Titch, a 1960s British homebuilt aircraft design

== See also ==
- Tich (disambiguation)
