= HMS Black Swan =

Sloop of the Royal Navy

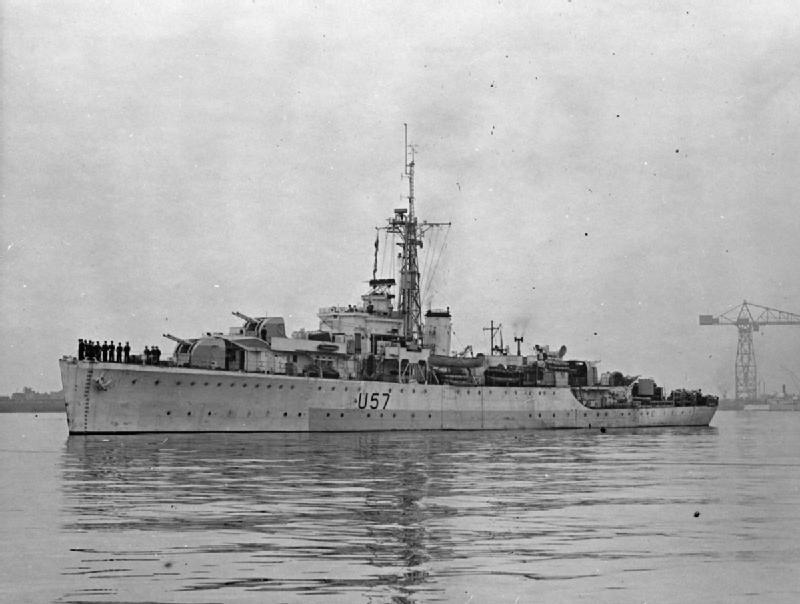
- Black Swan in April 1945

History

United Kingdom
- Name: HMS Black Swan
- Builder: Yarrow Shipbuilders
- Laid down: 20 June 1938
- Launched: 7 July 1939
- Commissioned: 27 January 1940
- Identification: Pennant number L57/U57/F57
- Fate: Scrapped in 1956

General characteristics
- Class & type: Black Swan-class sloop
- Displacement: 1,250 tons
- Length: 299 ft 6 in (91.29 m)
- Beam: 37 ft 6 in (11.43 m)
- Draught: 11 ft (3.4 m)
- Propulsion: Geared turbines, 2 shafts; 3,600 hp (2.7 MW)
- Speed: 19 knots (35 km/h)
- Range: 7,500 nmi (13,900 km) at 12 kn (22 km/h)
- Complement: 180
- Armament: 6 × 4-inch (102 mm) AA guns (3 × 2); 4 × 2-pounder AA pom-pom; 4 × 0.5-inch (12.7 mm) AA

Service record
- Part of: British Pacific Fleet (1945)
- Operations: Battle of the Atlantic (1943); Yangtze Incident (1949)
- Victories: U-124 (2 April 1943)

HMS Black Swan was the name ship of the Black Swan-class sloops of the Royal Navy. This class was admired for its sea-going qualities.

== Construction and design ==
Black Swan, named after the black swan, was laid down by Yarrow Shipbuilders on 20 June 1938, launched on 7 July 1939, and commissioned on 27 January 1940.

The Black Swan class was a lengthened version of the earlier Egret-class sloops. The main gun armament consisted of six QF 4 inch Mk XVI anti-aircraft guns in three twin turrets, with the fourth 4 inch turret of the Egret class removed to allow addition of a quadruple barrel 2-pounder pom-pom short-range anti-aircraft gun. Anti submarine armament consisted of depth charge throwers with 40 depth charges carried.

When completed, Black Swan was not fitted with the planned quadruple pom-pom, but with two quadruple Vickers .50 machine gun mounts fitted instead. The pom-pom was installed in May 1941, and the ineffective machine guns replaced by a single Oerlikon 20 mm cannon in September that year. The Hedgehog anti-submarine weapon and two more 20 mm cannon were fitted in June 1942, and a further three cannon were fitted in 1943. The ship's depth charge complement was increased to 110 during the war.

After a successful 'Warship Week' National Savings campaign in March 1942 the ship was adopted by the civil community of Widnes, Lancashire

== Operational history ==
Black Swan was initially deployed on convoy escort missions along the British east coast, before the Norwegian Campaign caused Black Swan to be attached to the Home Fleet, where it was used to provide anti-aircraft cover to the Allied landings at Åndalsnes. Black Swan was heavily engaged by German bombers before being hit by a bomb which passed through the ship before exploding, on 27 April 1940.

After repair, in June Black Swan returned to escort duty in the North Sea, before being damaged by a mine on 1 November 1940. This time, the ship was under repair until May 1941, when it was transferred to Western Approaches Command, escorting convoys in the Irish Sea. Black Swan was again slightly damaged by bombing in August that year and was transferred to Londonderry as part of the 37th Escort Group, escorting convoys to and from Gibraltar.

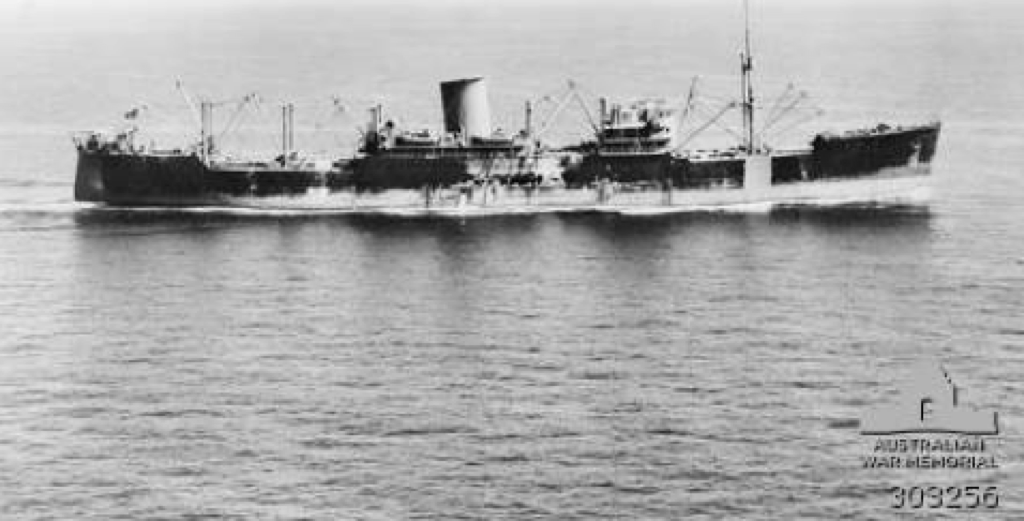
Black Swan rescued 61 survivors from two of Empire Star's lifeboats

On 25 October Black Swan rescued 34 survivors in a lifeboat from the cargo ship Empire Star, which had been sunk two days earlier. After a 120 nmi (140 mi; 220 km) search the sloop rescued another 27 survivors in a second lifeboat from the same ship. The next month Black Swan escorted convoys in support of Operation Torch.

On 2 April 1943, when escorting Convoy OS 45, from Liverpool to Freetown, Black Swan and the Flower-class corvette HMS Stonecrop sank the top-scoring U-boat U-124 with all hands off the coast of Portugal.

In 1943 Black Swan for a short time saw action near Iceland to provide escort against the U-boat threat, after which she served in the Mediterranean, on Malta and Adriatic convoy protection duties. From there, Black Swan passed through the Suez Canal en route to the Asia, Far East and Pacific theatres against the Japanese forces. The ship was on active duties as far as Australia and the Philippine Islands.

At the end of hostilities in 1945 Black Swan followed the cruiser HMS Belfast into Shanghai and were the first Royal Navy warships to liberate Japanese concentration camps containing British and Empire prisoners.

In 1949 she took part in the Yangtze Incident when she, with others, went to aid of HMS Amethyst. Black Swan suffered 12 men wounded and severe damage to her superstructure in a fierce engagement with Chinese batteries and fell back. The failed relief effort cost 46 killed and 64 injured. Black Swan also served in the Korean War and was involved in the Battle of Chumonchin Chan. Black Swan was scrapped in 1956 at Troon in Scotland. She was affiliated with TS Black Swan – a Sea Cadet Corps unit in Walton-on-Thames, Surrey.
