= German submarine U-1276 =

German World War II submarine

History

Nazi Germany
- Name: U-1276
- Ordered: 13 June 1942
- Builder: Bremer Vulkan of Bremen-Vegesack
- Yard number: 71
- Laid down: 13 July 1943
- Launched: 25 February 1944
- Commissioned: 6 April 1944
- Fate: Sunk on 20 February 1945

General characteristics
- Class & type: Type VIIC/41 submarine
- Displacement: 759 tonnes (747 long tons) surfaced; 860 t (846 long tons) submerged
- Length: 67.10 m (220 ft 2 in) o/a; 50.50 m (165 ft 8 in) pressure hull
- Beam: 6.20 m (20 ft 4 in) o/a; 4.70 m (15 ft 5 in) pressure hull
- Height: 9.60 m (31 ft 6 in)
- Draught: 4.74 m (15 ft 7 in)
- Installed power: 2,800–3,200 PS (2,100–2,400 kW; 2,800–3,200 bhp) (diesels); 750 PS (550 kW; 740 shp) (electric)
- Propulsion: 2 shafts; 2 × diesel engines; 2 × electric motors
- Speed: 17.7 knots (32.8 km/h; 20.4 mph) surfaced; 7.6 knots (14.1 km/h; 8.7 mph) submerged
- Range: 8,500 nmi (15,700 km; 9,800 mi) at 10 knots (19 km/h; 12 mph) surfaced; 80 nmi (150 km; 92 mi) at 4 knots (7.4 km/h; 4.6 mph) submerged
- Test depth: 230 m (750 ft); Calculated crush depth: 250–295 m (820–968 ft)
- Complement: 44-52 officers & ratings
- Armament: 5 × 53.3 cm (21 in) torpedo tubes (four bow, one stern); 14 × torpedoes; 1 × 8.8 cm (3.46 in) deck gun (220 rounds); 1 × 3.7 cm (1.5 in) Flak M42 AA gun; 2 × 2 cm (0.79 in) C/30 AA guns

Service record
- Part of: 8th U-boat Flotilla; 6 April – 31 October 1944; 11th U-boat Flotilla; 1 November 1944 – 20 February 1945
- Identification codes: M 07 089
- Commanders: Oblt.z.S. Karl-Heinz Wendt; 6 April 1944 – 20 February 1945
- Operations: 1 patrol: 28 January – 20 February 1945
- Victories: 1 warship sunk (925 tons)

German submarine U-1276 was a Type VIIC/41 U-boat of Nazi Germany's Kriegsmarine, built for service during World War II. She was laid down at Bremer Vulkan of Bremen-Vegesack on 13 July 1943. She was commissioned 6 April 1944 with Oberleutnant zur See Karl-Heinz Wendt in command. U-1276 was equipped with a submarine snorkel (underwater-breathing apparatus) when she sailed on her last cruise.

== Design ==
German Type VIIC/41 submarines were preceded by the heavier Type VIIC submarines. U-1276 had a displacement of 759 tonnes (747 long tons) when at the surface and 860 tonnes (850 long tons) while submerged. She had a total length of 67.10 m (220 ft 2 in), a pressure hull length of 50.50 m (165 ft 8 in), a beam of 6.20 m (20 ft 4 in), a height of 9.60 m (31 ft 6 in), and a draught of 4.74 m (15 ft 7 in). The submarine was powered by two Germaniawerft F46 four-stroke, six-cylinder supercharged diesel engines producing a total of 2,800 to 3,200 metric horsepower (2,060 to 2,350 kW; 2,760 to 3,160 shp) for use while surfaced, two AEG GU 460/8–27 double-acting electric motors producing a total of 750 metric horsepower (550 kW; 740 shp) for use while submerged. She had two shafts and two 1.23 m (4 ft) propellers. The boat was capable of operating at depths of up to 230 metres (750 ft).

The submarine had a maximum surface speed of 17.7 knots (32.8 km/h; 20.4 mph) and a maximum submerged speed of 7.6 knots (14.1 km/h; 8.7 mph). When submerged, the boat could operate for 80 nautical miles (150 km; 92 mi) at 4 knots (7.4 km/h; 4.6 mph); when surfaced, she could travel 8,500 nautical miles (15,700 km; 9,800 mi) at 10 knots (19 km/h; 12 mph). U-1276 was fitted with five 53.3 cm (21 in) torpedo tubes (four fitted at the bow and one at the stern), fourteen torpedoes, one 8.8 cm (3.46 in) SK C/35 naval gun, (220 rounds), one 3.7 cm (1.5 in) Flak M42 and two 2 cm (0.79 in) C/30 anti-aircraft guns. The boat had a complement of between forty-four and sixty.

== Service history ==
At 11:45 on 20 February 1945, U-1276 sank HMS Vervain, (Lt. Cdr. R.A. Howell, RNVR in command), a Flower-class corvette escorting convoy HX 337. Vervain sank after 20 minutes about 25 nautical miles (46 km; 29 mi) south-east of Dungarvan, Ireland. The commander, three officers and 56 ratings were lost. Three officers and 31 ratings were rescued. HMS Amethyst (Lt. Cdr. N. Scott-Elliot, DSC, RN in command), which was part of the same convoy, then sank U-1276 by depth charges, off Waterford, Ireland at position 51°48′N 07°07′W. All hands aboard the U-boat (49) were lost.

== Post war ==
In 2006, a group of divers from Ardmore Diving discovered the wreck site of U-1276 some 20 nautical miles (37 km; 23 mi) south of Youghal. The submarine is lying in 75 metres (41 fathoms) of water and largely intact, albeit visibly damaged by the depth charges that sank her.

== Summary of raiding history ==
Date	Ship Name	Nationality	Tonnage (Note: Merchant ship tonnages are in gross register tons. Military vessels are listed by tons displacement.)	Fate
20 February 1945	HMS Vervain	Royal Navy	925	Sunk

== See also ==
- Battle of the Atlantic

== Bibliography ==
- Busch, Rainer; Röll, Hans-Joachim (1999). German U-boat commanders of World War II : a biographical dictionary. Translated by Brooks, Geoffrey. London, Annapolis, Md: Greenhill Books, Naval Institute Press. ISBN 1-55750-186-6.
- Busch, Rainer; Röll, Hans-Joachim (1999). Deutsche U-Boot-Verluste von September 1939 bis Mai 1945 [German U-boat losses from September 1939 to May 1945]. Der U-Boot-Krieg (in German). Vol. IV. Hamburg, Berlin, Bonn: Mittler. ISBN 3-8132-0514-2.
- Gröner, Erich; Jung, Dieter; Maass, Martin (1991). U-boats and Mine Warfare Vessels. German Warships 1815–1945. Vol. 2. Translated by Thomas, Keith; Magowan, Rachel. London: Conway Maritime Press. ISBN 0-85177-593-4.
