= Rip (dog) =

Search-and-rescue dog known for rescuing victims of the Blitz (died 1946)

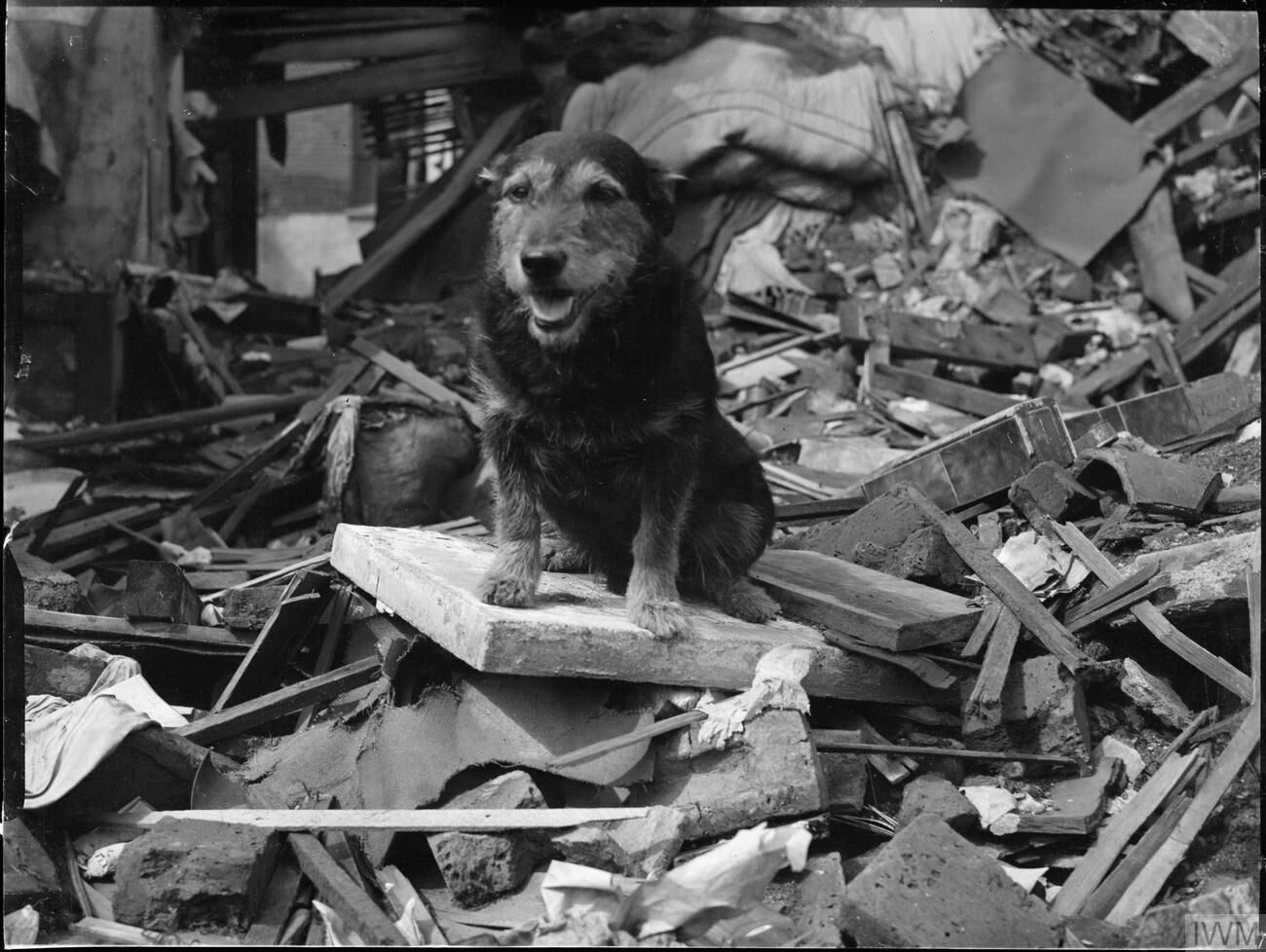
- A photograph of Rip from 1941.
- Species: Canis lupus familiaris
- Breed: Mixed breed terrier
- Sex: Male
- Died: 1946
- Resting place: PDSA Cemetery; Ilford, England
- Occupation: Search and rescue dog
- Owner: E. King
- Awards: Dickin Medal; Blue Cross Medal

Rip (died 1946), a mixed-breed terrier, was a Second World War search and rescue dog who was awarded the Dickin Medal for bravery in 1945. He was found in Poplar, London, in 1940 by an Air Raid warden, and became the service's first search and rescue dog. He is credited with saving the lives of over 100 people. He was the first of twelve Dickin Medal winners to be buried in the PDSA's cemetery in Ilford, Essex.

== Rescue career ==
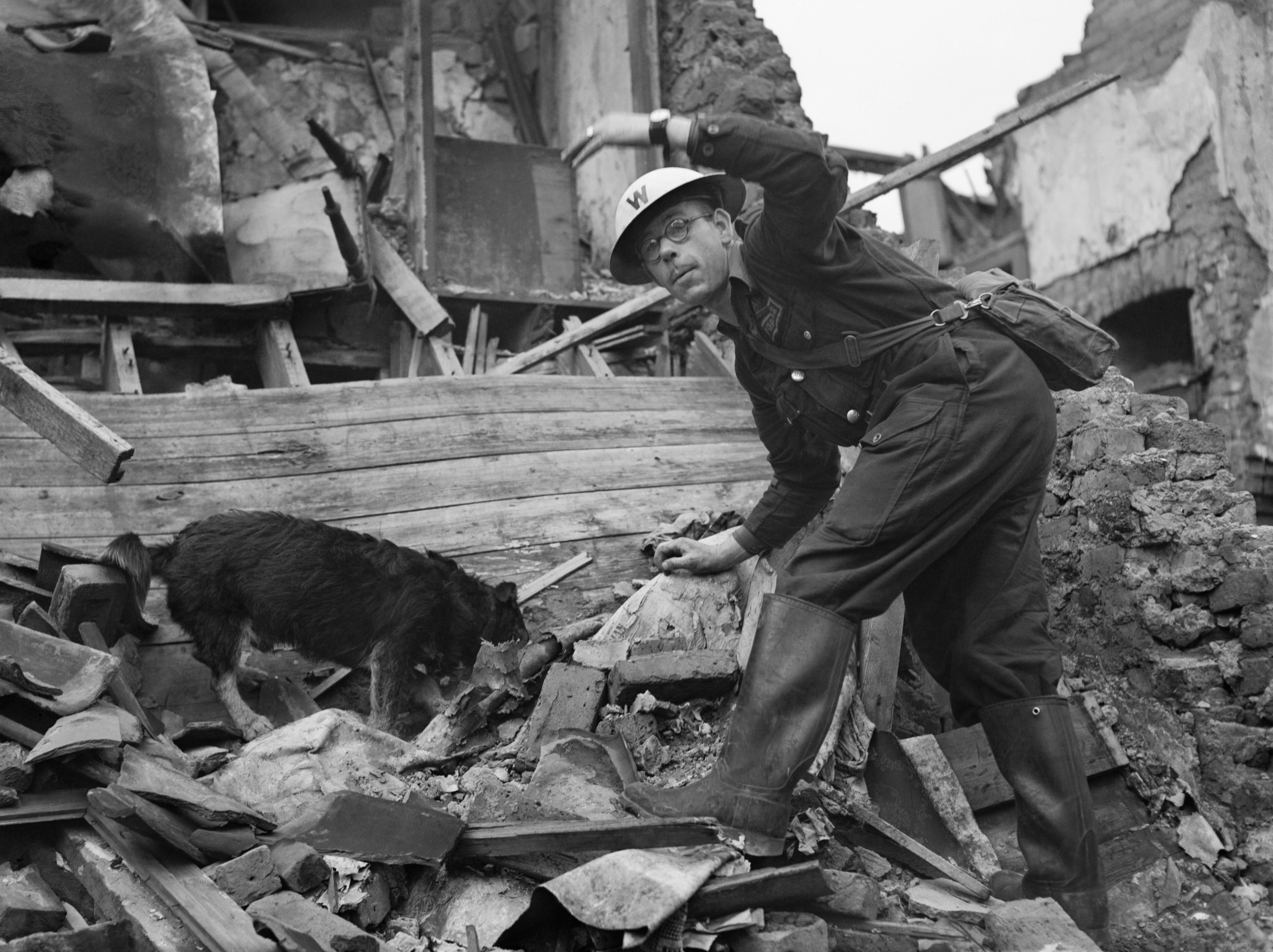
Rip searching through rubble, accompanied by his handler Mr E. King.

Rip was found as a stray following a heavy bombing raid of Poplar, London in 1940 by Air Raid Warden Mr E. King. He was thrown scraps by Mr King. Mr King worked at post B132 in Poplar, where Rip was adopted as mascot of the Southill Street Air Raid Patrol. He began acting as an unofficial rescue dog, being used to sniff out casualties trapped beneath buildings, and became the service's first search and rescue dog.

Rip was not trained for search and rescue work, but took to it instinctively. In twelve months between 1940 and 1941, he found over a hundred victims of the air raids in London. His success has been held partially responsible for prompting the authorities to train search and rescue dogs towards the end of World War II.

How welcome to the victims must have been the first sounds of those scrabbling paws, shrill terrier yaps, and the first sight of the grinning Tommy Brock face with its merry friendly eyes.

— Jilly Cooper, Animals in War (1983)

== Awards ==
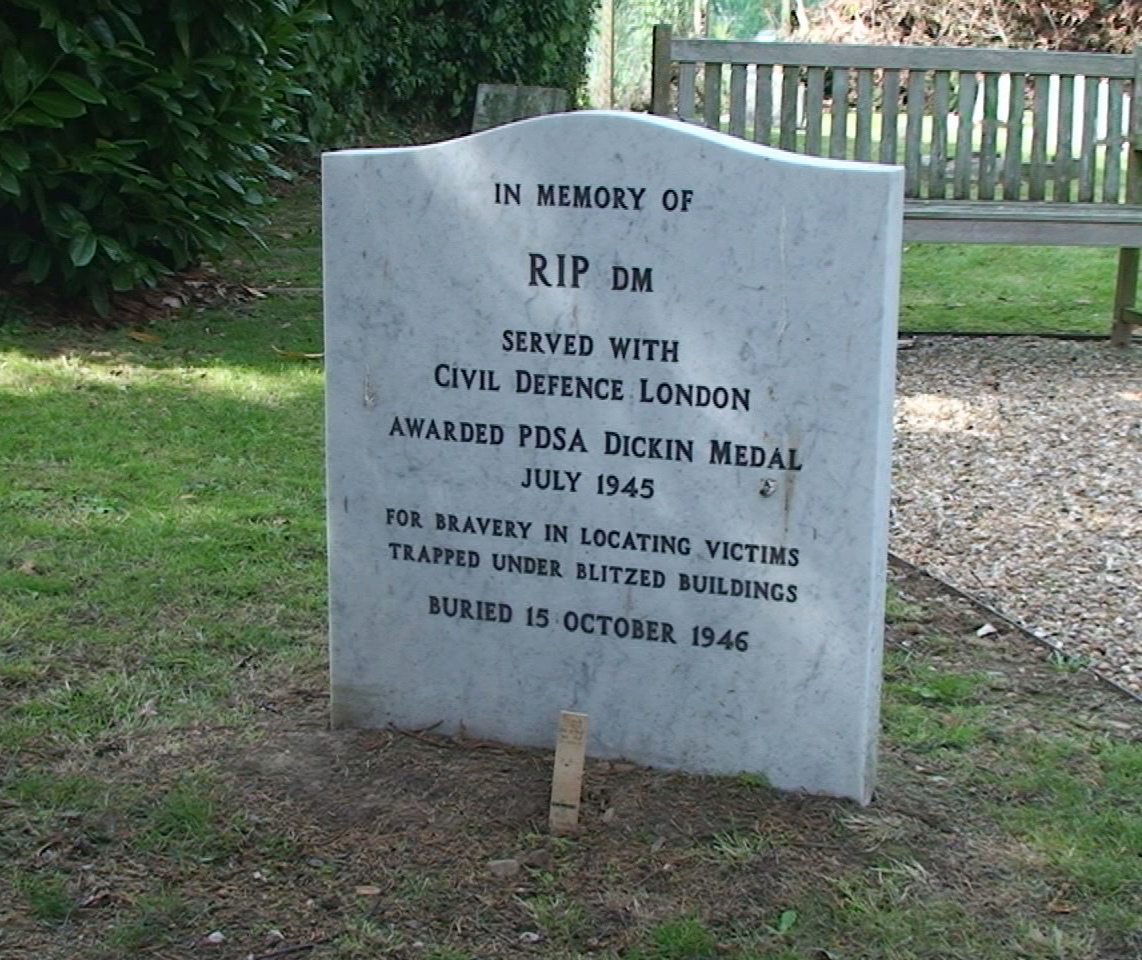
Rip's headstone at the Ilford Animal Cemetery

Rip was awarded the Dickin Medal in 1945, two years after it was introduced. The citation reads: "For locating many air-raid victims during the blitz of 1940". He would go on to wear the medal on his collar until the day he died. His medal was sold at auction in Bloomsbury, London on 23 April 2009. At the auction it fetched £24,250, a record price for a Dickin Medal. The Dickin Medal is often referred to as the animal metaphorical equivalent of the Victoria Cross.

When he died in 1946, Rip became the first of a number of Dickin Medal winners to be buried in the PDSA Cemetery in Ilford, Essex. Twelve recipients of the medal are now buried in the PDSA Cemetery.

== See also ==
- List of individual dogs
