= HMS Vervain =

Flower-class corvette

Coordinates: 51°47′N 7°6′W

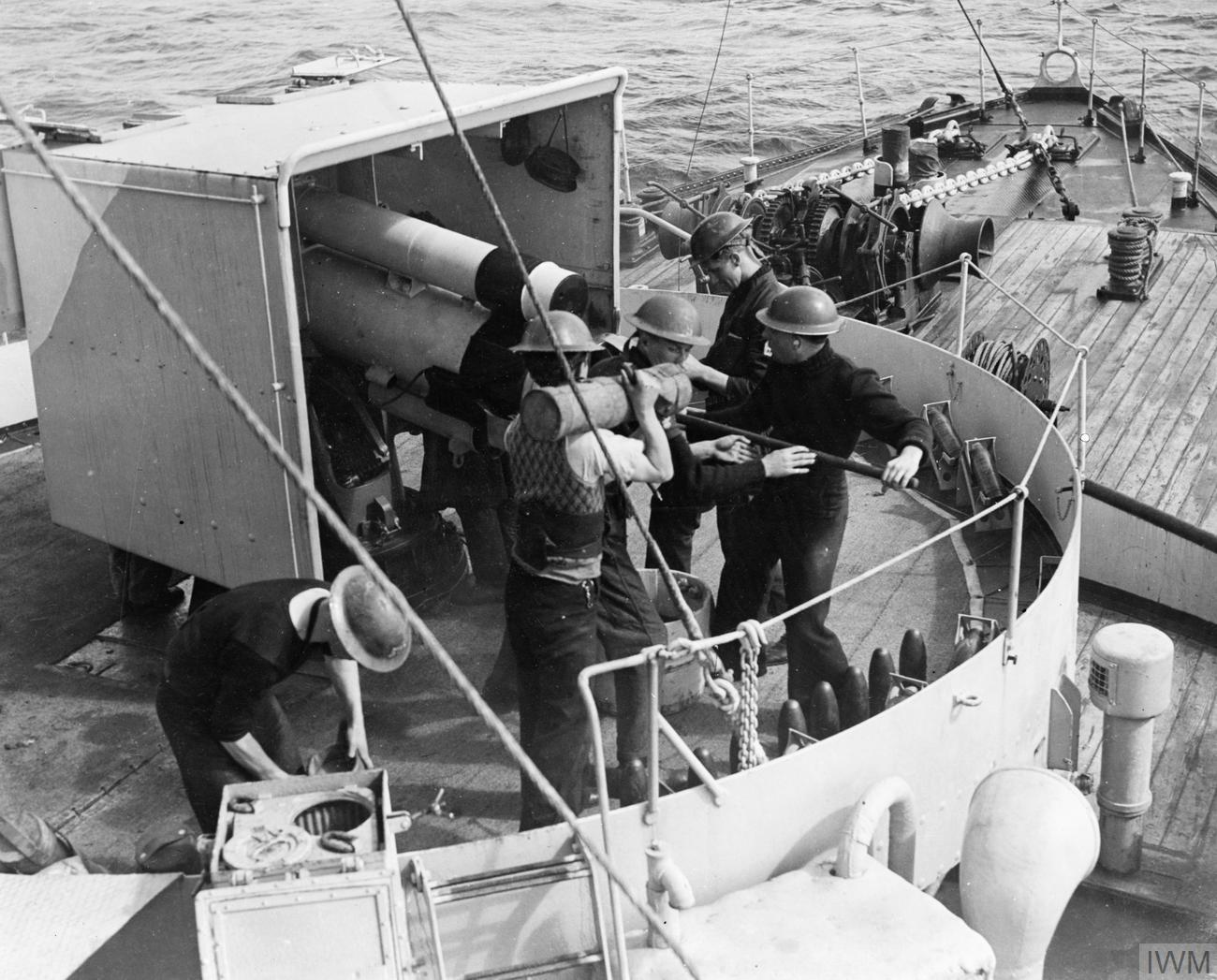
- HMS Vervain's 4-inch gun crew in action, July 1942

History

United Kingdom
- Name: HMS Vervain
- Namesake: Vervain
- Ordered: 8 April 1940
- Builder: Harland & Wolff, Belfast, Northern Ireland
- Yard number: 1101
- Laid down: 16 November 1940
- Launched: 12 March 1941
- Completed: 9 June 1941
- Commissioned: 9 June 1941
- Stricken: 20 February 1945
- Identification: Pennant number K190
- Fate: Torpedoed and sunk on 20 February 1945

General characteristics
- Class & type: Flower-class corvette
- Displacement: 925 long tons (940 t)
- Length: 205 ft (62.48 m) o/a
- Beam: 33 ft (10.06 m)
- Draught: 11.5 ft (3.51 m)
- Propulsion: single shaft; 2 × fire tube Scotch boilers; 1 × 4-cycle triple-expansion reciprocating steam engine; 2,750 ihp (2,050 kW)
- Speed: 16 knots (29.6 km/h)
- Range: 3,500 nautical miles (6,482 km) at 12 knots (22.2 km/h)
- Complement: 85
- Sensors & processing systems: 1 × SW1C or 2C radar; 1 × Type 123A or Type 127DV sonar
- Armament: 1 × 4-inch (102 mm) BL Mk.IX gun; 2 × .50-inch (12.7 mm) Vickers machine gun (twin); 2 × .303-inch (7.7 mm) Lewis machine gun (twin); 2 × Mk.II depth charge throwers; 2 × Depth charge rails with 40 depth charges; originally fitted with minesweeping gear, later removed

HMS Vervain (K190) was a Flower-class corvette of the Royal Navy, laid down as Broom but renamed in January 1941. She served during the Second World War.

In March 1942, the ship was adopted by the village of Queensbury in West Yorkshire.

On 28 February 1943 the Liberty ship SS Wade Hampton was torpedoed by the German submarine U-405 while sailing in a convoy from New York to Murmansk, Russia. Survivors were picked up by Vervain and HMS Beverley near Greenland.

On 20 February 1945 at 11:45 hours Vervain was escorting a homeward-bound convoy when she was sunk by a torpedo from a U-boat, U-1276 under Oberleutnant zur See Karl-Heinz Wendt, about 25 miles (40 km) southeast of Dungarvan, Ireland, south of Waterford. Vervain sank after 20 minutes. The commander, three officers and 56 ratings were lost. Three officers and 30 ratings were rescued. In turn the U-boat, U-1276 was sunk with depth charges by HMS Amethyst. The action resulted in the loss of all 49 of the U-boat's crew.

HMS Vervain is a Designated vessel under schedule 1 of The Protection of Military Remains Act 1986 (Designation of Vessels and Controlled Sites) Order 2012.

== Publications ==
- Colledge, J. J.; Warlow, Ben; Bush, Steve (2020) [1969]. Ships of the Royal Navy: The Complete Record of all Fighting Ships of the Royal Navy from the 15th Century to the Present (5th Rev ed.). Barnsley: Seaforth. ISBN 978-1-5267-9327-0. OCLC 1240269883.
- National Archives
