= Beauty (dog) =

Rescue dog in the Second World War

- Born: 4 January 1939
- Died: 17 October 1950 (aged 11)
- Resting place: Ilford Animal Cemetery
- Occupation: Search and rescue dog
- Years active: 1940–1945
- Awards: PDSA Pioneer Medal; Dickin Medal

Beauty (4 January 1939 – 17 October 1950), a wirehaired terrier, was a Second World War search and rescue dog considered to be the first rescue dog, who was awarded the Dickin Medal for bravery in 1945. She is among a number of Dickin Medal winners who are buried in Ilford Animal Cemetery.

== Rescue career ==
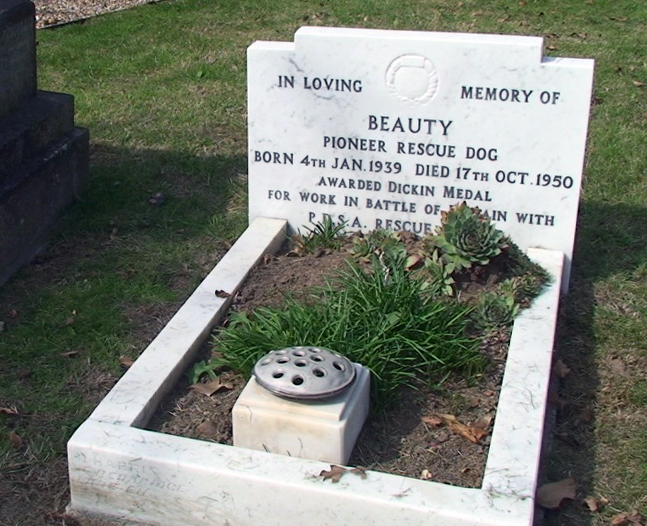
Beauty's grave at the Ilford Animal Cemetery

Beauty was born on 4 January 1939, and was owned by PDSA Superintendent Bill Barnet, who led one of the rescue squads in London for animals during the Blitz. The dog would accompany Barnet on rescue missions for company.

One day in 1940, whilst out with her owner on a rescue mission, she began to dig in the rubble alongside the rescue teams. Within minutes a cat was discovered, becoming the first of 63 animals Beauty found during her war service. She is considered to be the original rescue dog.

Beauty died on 17 October 1950, and was buried in the Ilford Animal Cemetery, founded and operated by the PDSA. She is one of several winners of the Dickin Medal to be buried at the PDSA cemetery in Ilford.

== Awards ==
For her service, Beauty was awarded the PDSA Pioneer Medal, an award normally given to people, and a silver medal inscribed "For Services Rendered" by the Deputy Mayor of Hendon, and was given the Freedom of Holland Park. Beauty was awarded the Dickin Medal on 12 January 1945. The inscription "For being the pioneer dog in locating buried air-raid victims while serving with a PDSA Rescue Squad."

Her medals were passed into the care of the PDSA after her death and went on display in "The Animal's War" exhibitions at the Imperial War Museum North which ran from 26 May 2007 to 6 January 2008. The Dickin Medal is often referred to as the animal equivalent of the Victoria Cross.

== See also ==
- Rifleman Khan
- List of individual dogs
