= Mary of Exeter =

Military carrier pigeon

Mary of Exeter was a carrier pigeon who flew many military missions with the National Pigeon Service during World War II, transporting important messages across the English Channel back to her loft in Exeter, England. She was awarded the Dickin Medal in November 1945 for showing endurance on war service despite being injured on three occasions and emerging uninjured when her loft was bombed.

Mary was owned by Cecil "Charlie" Brewer, a bootmaker from Exeter. She served with the National Pigeon Service between 1940 and 1945 carrying top secret messages. Mary made four trips from France to England.

She died in 1950 and is buried in Ilford Animal Cemetery.

== Attacks survived ==
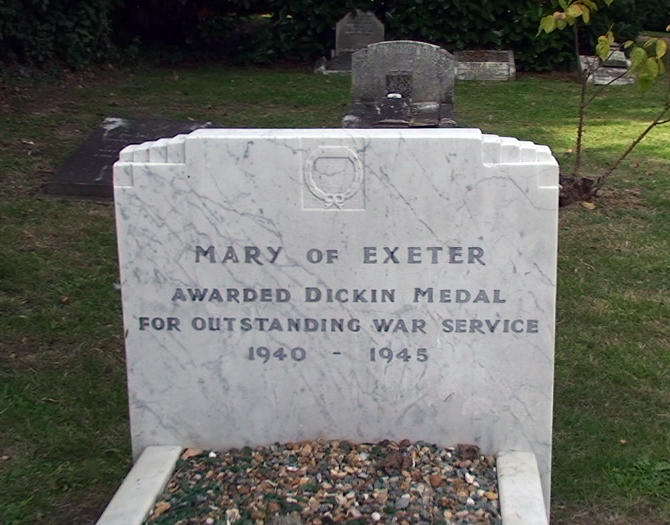
Mary's grave at the Ilford Animal Cemetery

Mary completed many missions, including three in which she was wounded by enemy attacks, requiring a total of 22 stitches. In addition, she survived a Luftwaffe bomber attack on her Exeter pigeon loft.

=== Attacked by German war hawk ===
On one occasion she was attacked by German-kept hawks stationed in Pas-de-Calais returning home with her neck and right breast ripped savagely open. She recovered sufficiently and was put back in service two months later.

=== Shot ===
On another occasion, Mary returned with the tip of one wing shot off and three pellets were removed from her body. She recovered, passed flight tests, and was returned to service despite the shortened wing.

=== Hit by shrapnel ===
During her final trip her neck muscles were damaged by shrapnel. Her owner made her a leather collar to hold her head up, and took her out of service.

=== Exeter pigeon loft bombed ===
Mary's loft, located at Brewer's house, was damaged during the Luftwaffe's 1942 raids on Exeter, killing many of the pigeons housed there. Mary, however, survived.

== Exeter Civic Society Blue Plaque ==
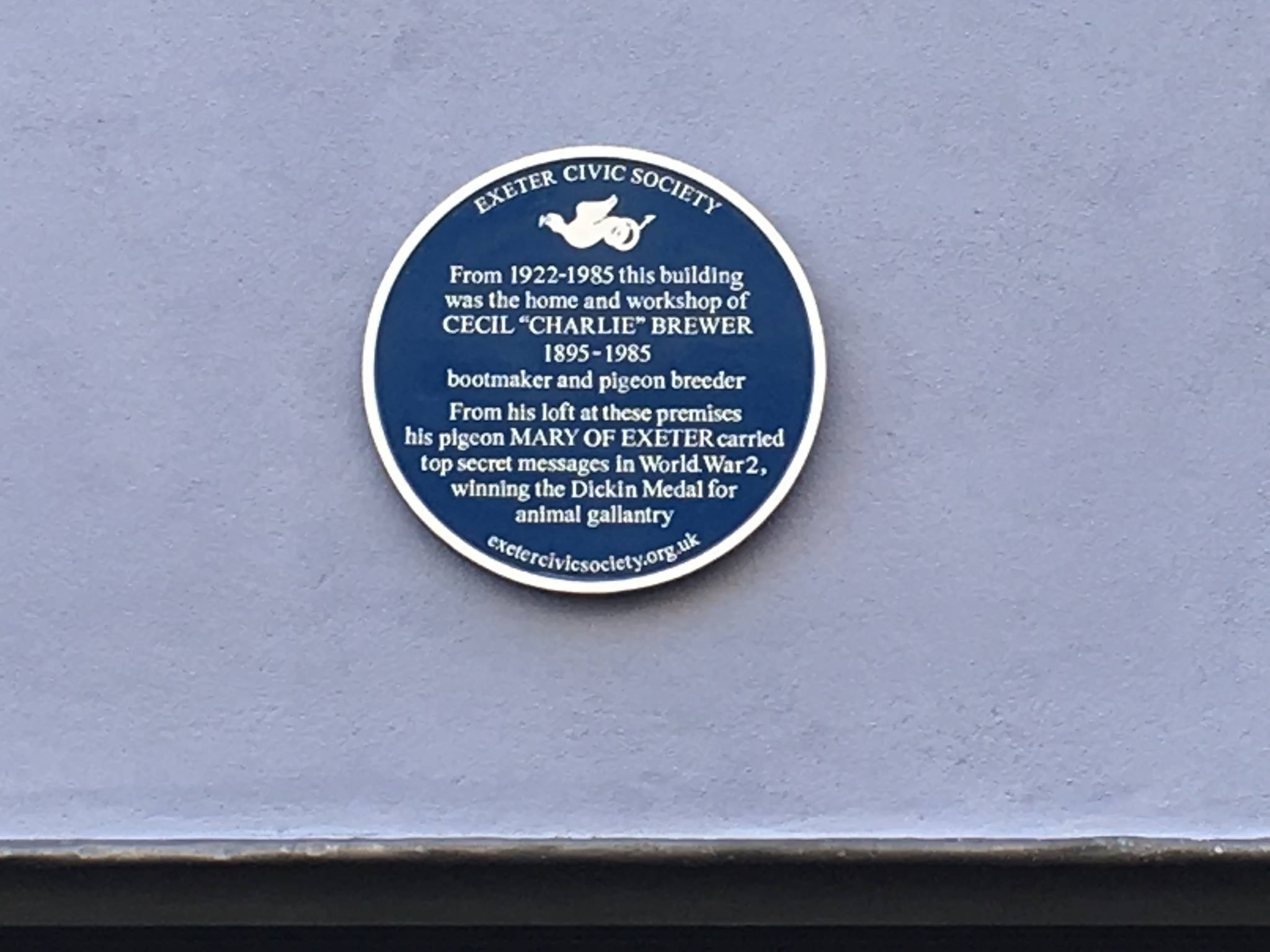
A Blue Plaque from Exeter Civic Society to commemorate the partnership of a heroic animal and its owner Cecil 'Charlie' Brewer. It is the first such plaque and marks a unique site and chapter in Exeter's Second World War history

A blue plaque was unveiled at 6 West Street, Exeter, EX1 1BA, the site of Charlie Brewer's home and shoemaker's shop for 63 years. His pigeon loft was also at these premises. The unveiling took place on 20 January 2018, followed by a celebration and refreshments at the nearby Picturehouse Cinema.

== See also ==
- List of individual birds
- List of Horrible Histories episodes, season 1, episode 2
