= Peter (dog) =

Dog receiver of the Dickin Medal

- Species: Canis familiaris
- Breed: Collie
- Sex: Male
- Born: 1941
- Died: 1952 (aged 10–11)
- Resting place: Plot 569, Ilford Animal Cemetery; 51°35′13″N 0°2′45″E
- Nationality: British
- Notable role: Search and rescue dog
- Owner: A.Y. Stables
- Awards: Dickin Medal

Peter (1941–1952) was a collie dog who in 1945 was awarded the Dickin Medal, considered to be the Victoria Cross for animals. During the later stages of the Second World War he served as a search and rescue dog in London. He attended the 1946 Civil Defence Stand–Down parade, where he was presented to the King and Queen, and Princess Elizabeth. His medal was auctioned in 2000 for £4,600 (US$6,964).

== Rescue career ==
Peter was born in 1941, and was purchased by Mrs Audrey Stables, of Gregory Avenue, Weoley Castle, for 25 shillings. He was noted by his owner as having dual talents; for destruction of his owner's home and for ignoring every command given. He was transferred into war service, serving with Air Ministry dog-handler Archie Knight at the Civil Defence depot in Chelsea. He was known as Rescue Dog No. 2664/9288 Peter.

Active from early 1945 until the end of the Second World War, Peter acted as a search and rescue dog in London. Knight wrote of the dog in a report, "I think one of his finest jobs was on Monday. We were called 20 hours after the incident and after several hours of heavy rain. Three bodies were missing and he very quickly indicated in a most unlikely spot, but he was right, and they uncovered a man and a woman. The next day we were called to another job. There were so many calls for Peter that I worked him 10 hours and he never once refused to give all he had. All his marks revealed casualties. I hated to work him like this – but I also hated to refuse the rescue parties who were asking for him." Peter's rescue efforts were not limited to saving people; on one occasion he indicated a trapped victim which turned out to be a grey parrot. On another occasion he saved six people in a single attack.

In 1946, Peter and his handler were present at the Civil Defence Stand–Down parade in Hyde Park, London. It was there that he was presented to King and Queen, and received a kiss on the nose from Princess Elizabeth, the future Elizabeth II.

He was later used to demonstrate mountain rescue techniques to other rescue dogs and handlers. He returned home to Mrs Stables, and moved to a PDSA animal sanctuary before he died. Peter was buried at the PDSA's Ilford Animal Cemetery on 20 November 1952, one of twelve recipients of the Dickin Medal to be buried there.

== Awards ==
Peter was awarded the Dickin Medal, considered to be the Victoria Cross for animals, in November 1945. His citation read, "For locating victims trapped under blitzed buildings while serving with the MAP attached to Civil Defence of London." The ceremony was conducted at the Grosvenor House Hotel, where he was awarded the medal by Sir James Ross of the Air Ministry. The Dickin Medal is often referred to as the animal metaphorical equivalent of the Victoria Cross.

His Dickin Medal was auctioned by Spinks on 27 July 2000 for £4,600 (US$6,964). Peter's owner had died, and the medal was being sold by a private collector. At the same auction, the Dickin Medal awarded to the pigeon Tyke was also sold.

== See also ==
- List of individual dogs
