= Hounds for Heroes =

British charity

Hounds For Heroes
- Formation: 17 February 2010
- Type: Charity
- Legal status: Company limited by guarantee
- Purpose: Providing wounded British Armed Forces servicemen and women and Emergency Services men and women with Service dog's
- Headquarters: Petersfield, Hampshire
- Location: United Kingdom
- Region served: England, Scotland, Wales
- Official language: English
- Managing Director: Allen Parton (Founder)
- Website: www.houndsforheroes.com

Hounds for Heroes is a British charity launched in February 2010 to help train and provide service dogs to wounded British Armed Forces and Emergency Services men and women.

== Background ==
Hounds for Heroes was founded in 2009 and registered in February 2010 by Allen Parton, an ex- Royal Navy servicemen who had suffered a traumatic head injury on active duty whilst serving in the Gulf in 1991. The charity was set up in both the memory of his original Assistance dog Endal, who was euthanised on 13 March 2009, and to help the injured.

== Objectives ==
According to the organisation's official website, "The purpose of 'Hounds for Heroes' is to provide specially trained assistance dogs to injured and disabled men and women of both the UK Armed Forces and Civilian Emergency Services.Through this provision our aims are to provide help and practical support, leading to an enhanced quality of life for our clients."

Their initial goal was to raise £100,000 to purchase and train five Labrador puppies to serve as service dogs for injured men and women from the armed forces and emergency services. The organisation receives no public funding, and depends entirely upon contributions.

== Media ==
- ITV Television
- BBC television
