= Endal =

Acclaimed service dog

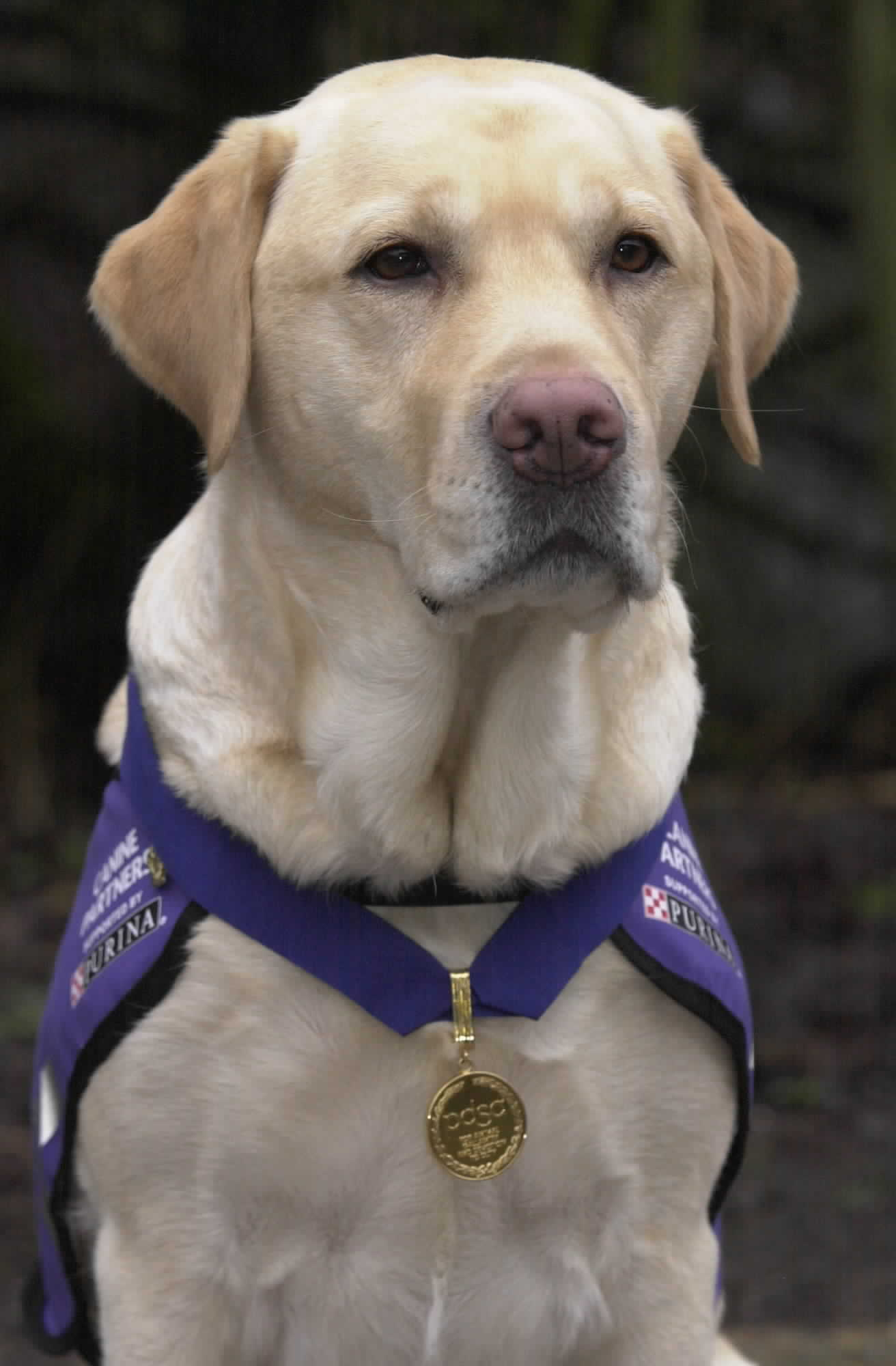
- Endal, wearing his PDSA Gold Medal
- Species: Canis familiaris
- Breed: Labrador Retriever
- Sex: Male
- Born: 13 December 1995
- Died: 13 March 2009 (aged 13)
- Resting place: Ilford PDSA Animal Cemetery,
- Nationality: British
- Occupation: Service dog
- Successor: Endal Junior
- Owners: Allen Parton; Sandra Parton

Endal (13 December 1995 – 13 March 2009) was a male Labrador Retriever in Britain whose abilities as a service dog and as an ambassador for service dog charitable work received worldwide news media coverage.

Among other distinctions, Endal was described as "the most decorated dog in the world" (including "Dog of the Millennium" and the PDSA Gold Medal for Animal Gallantry and Devotion to Duty, the highest award available to an animal) and possibly the most famous assistance dog in the UK. He was filmed by over 340 film crews from around the world, and had a number of world "firsts" as an assistance dog to his credit.

== Background ==
=== Endal ===
Endal was a pedigree yellow Labrador Retriever. From birth Endal had the lifelong debilitating joint condition osteochondrosis in both of his front legs, which brought his suitability for assistance dog training into question. However, due to Endal's intelligence and problem-solving abilities he qualified as a fully operational and accredited assistance dog although he was only part trained by the charity Canine Partners for Independence.

He became the service dog for disabled ex-Royal Navy Chief Petty Officer Allen Parton in the late 1990s.

Endal's fame led to his taking on the role of an animal ambassador for service dog-related training and charities.

On 13 March 2009, age thirteen and days after his last Crufts appearance, Endal had to be put down as his age had finally caught up to him. He had a stroke, and his arthritis had become severe over time. Endal is buried at Ilford PDSA Animal Cemetery, which is also the resting place for twelve previous dogs awarded the PDSA Dickin Medal, predecessor to the gold medal. A yellow Labrador puppy named EJ (Endal Junior) was in training at the time, whom Endal mentored during his final 9 months.

=== Allen Parton ===
Endal's owner was Allen Parton. Parton sustained serious head injuries whilst serving with the Royal Navy in the Gulf in 1991, including 50% memory loss and inability to reliably make new memories for more than around 2 days (for example, not recognising his neighbour of 7 years), physical disability (he was a wheelchair user), speech and word difficulties, inability to perceive materials that are out of his sight, and inability to safely judge speed and distance of traffic. For a considerable time after partnering with Endal, he was unable to speak and was limited to basic sign language. In 2008, commenting on a portrait of Endal, Parton said that one of his greatest fears was that, in 10 years, he would be unable to remember what Endal looked like. In February 2010, Parton registered a new charity, named Hounds for Heroes, in memory of Endal and to help men and women who have been injured in the UK Armed Forces and Emergency Services.

== Work as a service dog ==
Endal was able to respond to over one hundred instructions as well as a very large number ("hundreds") of signed commands. He could retrieve items from supermarket shelves, operate buttons and switches, and load and empty a washing machine. He was able to put a card into a cash machine, retrieve the card when the process was complete, and return the card to a wallet.

When I couldn't talk, he learned sign language – if I touched my head I wanted my hat, if I touched my face it was for the razor. He learned hundreds of commands in signing. Eventually one day, in this very silent world we lived in, I grunted. That was like an electric shock going through him, he was so excited. They said I'd never speak again, but Endal just dragged the speech out of me.

— Able Magazine

The above Able Magazine article continues on: "Over the years, Endal has learned to pull the plug out of the bath before going for help if Parton falls unconscious whilst bathing, and is able to put Parton in the recovery position, hit the emergency button on the telephone and summon help... Endal has learned how to use both chip and PIN ATMs as well as helping out with shopping, opening train doors, operating lifts, unloading the washing machine and more typical doggie skills like getting the paper."

Parton states that Endal's ability to comprehend his wishes and needs showed when they first met, and this was responsible for helping him recover from the initial deep depression and trauma caused by his disability.

Endal came again to national attention in a 2001 incident, when Parton was knocked out of his wheelchair by a passing car outside a hotel. Endal pulled Parton into the recovery position, retrieved his mobile phone from beneath the car, retrieved a blanket from the upturned wheelchair and covered him, alert barked at a nearby hotel for assistance with no result, and then ran to the hotel to obtain help. Endal is also:

- The first dog to ride on the London Eye, a giant Ferris wheel.
- The first dog known to be able to operate an ATM card, including both card insertion and card removal.

=== Awards ===
Year	Awards
2000	2000 Prodog "Dog of the Year" Award; 2000 "Dog of the Millennium" (named by Dogs Today)
2001	2001 "Local Hero" Award
2002	2001/2 "Assistance Dog of the Year" Award; 2002 awarded the first ever "Lifetime Achievement" Award at the Golden Bone Awards; 2002 first assistance dog to be awarded the UK Kennel Club's "Gold Good Citizen" award, presented at Crufts dog show 2002; 2002 PDSA Gold Medal (the animal equivalent of the George Cross), awarded to animals who have shown outstanding devotion to their duties in peacetime (As of October 2010 only 18 animals in the UK—all dogs—had been awarded this medal)
2003	Gold Blue Peter Badge, the highest award for "outstanding bravery and courage," one of only two ever awarded to dogs (the other was the Blue Peter dog "Bonnie" in 1991)
2004	2004 "Lifetime Achievement Award" (Wag and Bone Show)
2005	2005 Crufts dog show Runner up "Hero Dog of the Year"

=== Other recognition ===
Dogs with Jobs, a Canadian TV series and in a book about that series, covered Endal. Endal appeared in the Sky real Lives documentary "The Dog that saved our marriage", transmitted on 12 March 2009. Endal appeared in the ITV documentary "The Secret Life of Dogs" transmitted on British ITV. He also appeared on National Geographic.

The Endal awards have been created to honour his loyalty and devotion to duty in the form of a medal, and these are issued at an annual award ceremony held at the London Pet Show. A road in Clanfield, Hampshire, in England has been named "Endal Way" in memory of Endal.

== Work as an ambassador for service dog charitable work ==
As a trustee of the charity Canine Partners, Endal's owner and handler Allen Parton publicised the skilled training which is needed for assistance dogs by using the story of Endal as an example. Parton and Endal were both patrons of Labrador Rescue South East and Central.

According to a description of Endal by Parton at makeyourdogahero.co.uk:

"Another more private role is Endal's work with autistic and terminally ill children. Endal has represented the charity Canine Partners, is a patron of Labrador Rescue, an advisor to Dog Theft Action. He has been used to promote many issues to do with animal welfare and has also helped raise funds for many of the service charities such as SSAFA, the Royal Naval Benevolent Trust, British Legion and Seafarers UK." organisation.

== Related media ==
=== Book ===
A book entitled Endal by Allen and Sandra Parton was released on 5 February 2009.

=== Film ===
A film of Endal's life story, based around the Endal book, was announced on 1 September 2009.

== Other personality attributes ==
Parton reports that alongside Endal's working life and training, he retained during his life a number of the mischievous traits that Labrador Retrievers are known for. As examples he cites that Endal would still decide at times to chase squirrels in the park, or might take waste paper out of the rubbish bin to Parton, in order to gain a reward for "picking it up from the floor".

== See also ==
- Assistance dog
- List of Labradors
- List of individual dogs
