= HMS Concord (R63) =

C-class destroyer

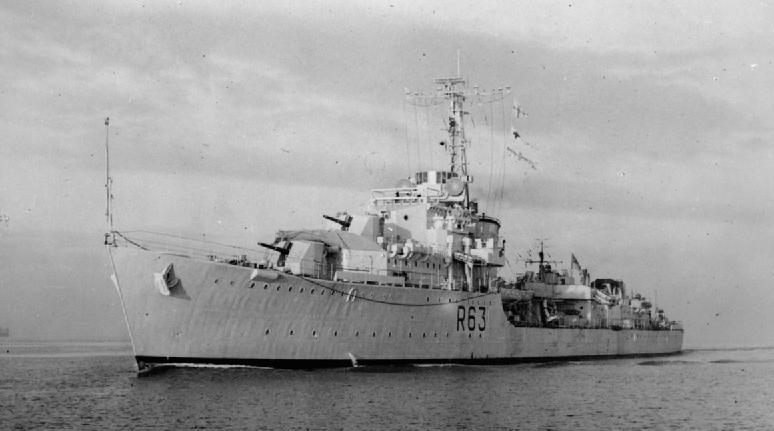

History

United Kingdom
- Name: HMS Concord
- Builder: John I. Thornycroft & Company, Southampton
- Laid down: 18 November 1943
- Launched: 14 May 1945
- Commissioned: 20 December 1946
- Renamed: Launched as Corso; Renamed Concord in June 1946
- Identification: Pennant number: R63 (later D03)
- Fate: Arrived for breaking up on 22 October 1962

General characteristics
- Class & type: C-class destroyer
- Displacement: 1,885 tons (1,915 tonnes); 2,545 tons full (2,585 tonnes)
- Length: 362.75 ft (110.57 m) o/a
- Beam: 35.75 ft (10.90 m)
- Draught: 11.75 ft (3.58 m)
- Propulsion: 2 Admiralty 3-drum boilers, Parsons single-reduction geared steam turbines, 40,000 shp (29.8 MW), 2 shafts
- Speed: 36 knots (67 km/h) / 32 knots (59 km/h) full
- Range: 4,675 nmi (8,658 km) at 20 knots (37 km/h); 1,400 nmi (2,600 km) at 32 knots (59 km/h)
- Complement: 186
- Sensors & processing systems: Radar Type 275 fire control on director Mk.VI
- Armament: 4 × QF 4.5 in (114 mm) L/45 guns Mark IV on mounts CP Mk.V; 2 × Bofors 40 mm L/60 guns on twin mount "Hazemeyer" Mk.IV, or; 4 × QF 2 pdr L/39 guns Mk.VIII on quad mount Mk.VII (Caprice only); 4 × anti-aircraft mountings; Single Bofors 40 mm Mk.III; Single QF 2 - pdr Mk.VIII Mk.XVI; Single Oerlikon 20 mm P Mk.III; Twin Oerlikon 20 mm Mk.V; 8 (2x4) tubes for 21 inch (533 mm) torpedoes Mk.IX; 4 throwers and 2 racks for 96 depth charges

HMS Concord was a C-class destroyer of the Royal Navy.

She was initially ordered as Corso during the Second World War, and was built by John I. Thornycroft & Company, Southampton. She was launched on 14 May 1945, renamed Concord in June 1946 and commissioned on 20 December 1946.

== Operational service ==
Concord served in the Far East between 1947 and 1957 as part of the 8th Destroyer Squadron. In 1949, she was involved in the Amethyst Incident. Concord entered the River Yangtze and proceeded to a point off the Woosung Fort, the location of a heavy gun battery 38 miles (61 km) from the mouth of the river. Lieutenant Commander Kerans, commanding the sloop Amethyst, had from the beginning requested that Concord should meet him there to give protection at the most critical point of his escape. Concord provided sailors to fill out the thinned ranks aboard Amethyst and the two ships made their way downriver There was no boom at the mouth of the river. After handing over the escort of Amethyst to other vessels, Concord was ordered to Japan. Concord went on to serve during the Korean War.

== Decommissioning and disposal ==
Concord was withdrawn from active service in 1957. Following decommissioning she was attached to HMS Caledonia at Rosyth as a static training ship. Following her sale Concord arrived at the breakers yard of Thos. W. Ward at Inverkeithing on 22 October 1962.

== Publications ==
- Colledge, J. J.; Warlow, Ben (2006) [1969]. Ships of the Royal Navy: The Complete Record of All Fighting Ships of the Royal Navy from the 15th Century to the Present (3rd Rev ed.). London: Chatham Publishing. ISBN 978-1-86176-281-8. OCLC 67375475.
- Marriott, Leo (1989). Royal Navy Destroyers Since 1945. Ian Allan Ltd. ISBN 0-7110-1817-0.
- Raven, Alan; Roberts, John (1978). War Built Destroyers O to Z Classes. London: Bivouac Books. ISBN 0-85680-010-4.
- Whitley, M. J. (1988). Destroyers of World War 2. Annapolis, Maryland: Naval Institute Press. ISBN 0-87021-326-1.
