= Tich (dog) =

Military dog during World War II

- Species: Canis familiaris
- Breed: Mixed-breed dog
- Sex: Female
- Born: 1940
- Died: 1959
- Resting place: PDSA's pet cemetery in Ilford, Essex
- Nationality: (Egypt) Egyptian
- Employer: King's Royal Rifle Corps
- Awards: Dickin Medal

Tich (1940–1959) was a military dog during the Second World War. She was awarded the Dickin Medal in 1949 for her actions during the war as a battalion mascot to the King's Royal Rifle Corps. After the war she lived with her battalion handler at his home in the UK. When she died she was buried in the People's Dispensary for Sick Animals (PDSA)'s Ilford Animal Cemetery.

== Military service ==
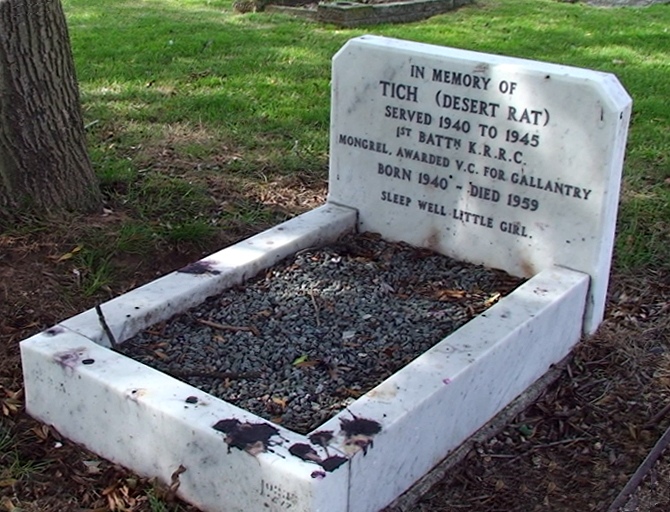
Tich's grave at Ilford Animal Cemetery

During the fighting in the Western Desert Campaign in 1941, a small mongrel bitch was found by soldiers of the 1st Battalion King's Royal Rifle Corps. Named "Tich" and nicknamed "The Desert Rat", she acted as a mascot to the battalion. In 1943, the dog was passed to Rifleman Thomas Walker. The dog accompanied Walker whilst on the front line, riding usually on the bonnet of a Bren gun carrier or a jeep.

In 1944, she was smuggled aboard the ship which took the battalion to Italy and whilst on board had puppies. Walker was awarded the Military Medal for his work as a battlefield medic whilst under fire. On each occasion where he was in danger, Tich remained by his side. 1KRRC's commanding officer Lieutenant-Colonel E. A. W. Williams recommended Tich for the Dickin Medal stating, "Her courage and devotion to duty were of very real and considerable value and her courageous example materially helped many men to keep their heads and sense of proportion in times of extreme danger. The sight of her put heart in the men as she habitually rode on the bonnet of her master’s jeep and refused to leave her post even when bringing in wounded under heavy fire."

Her Dickin Medal was dated 1 July 1949, with it being awarded to her by Major Peter Earle, MC, on 3 September 1949 at Wembley in front of eight thousand people during the Animals' Rally. Her citation reads, "For loyalty, courage and devotion to duty under hazardous conditions of war 1941 to 1945, while serving with the 1st King's Rifle Corps in North Africa and Italy."

The Dickin Medal is often referred to as the animal equivalent of the Victoria Cross.

== Later life ==
Tich gave birth to fifteen puppies during her life, and lived after the war with Walker at his home in Newcastle, England. Together they took part in fundraising activities for the People's Dispensary for Sick Animals, the issuing body for the Dickin Medal. She died in 1959, and was buried at the PDSA's Ilford Animal Cemetery where several other Dickin Medal holders are interred. Her Dickin Medal was passed into the hands of the Royal Green Jackets (Rifles) Museum in Winchester.

== See also ==
- List of individual dogs
