= Tyke (pigeon) =

Tyke, also known as 'George' and carrying the service number 1263 MEPS 43, was a male Second World War homing pigeon who was awarded the Dickin Medal for gallantry in 1943 for delivering a message from a downed aircrew. His medal was sold for £4,830 ($7,313) in July 2000.

== Military service ==
Tyke was hatched in Cairo, Egypt, from British and South African parents, and was seconded into military service. Bomber crews would carry homing pigeons in order to get word of their location back to home base should they be shot down. In June 1943, the American bomber he was stationed on was shot down, and Tyke was released in order to get help. He flew over a hundred miles in poor visibility, passing on the crew's call for help to friendly forces. The bomber crew credited the pigeon with saving their lives.

Tyke was awarded the Dickin Medal for his actions, an animal-only medal issued by the People's Dispensary for Sick Animals. Tyke's citation reads, "For delivering a message under exceptionally difficult conditions and so contributing to the rescue of an Air Crew, while serving with the RAF in the Mediterranean in June, 1943." He was one of the first pigeons to be awarded the Dickin Medal, along with White Vision and Winkie, who each received the award on 2 December 1943.

== Legacy ==
In July 2000, Tyke's Dickin Medal was auctioned by Spink Auction House in London. It was sold for the sum of £4,830 ($7,313) after receiving an initial top estimate of £3,500 ($5,299). Fellow Dickin medallist Peter's medal was auctioned at the same event.

== See also ==
- List of individual birds
