= Amethyst incident =

Chinese civil war incident

- Part of the Chinese Civil War and the Yangtze River Crossing campaign
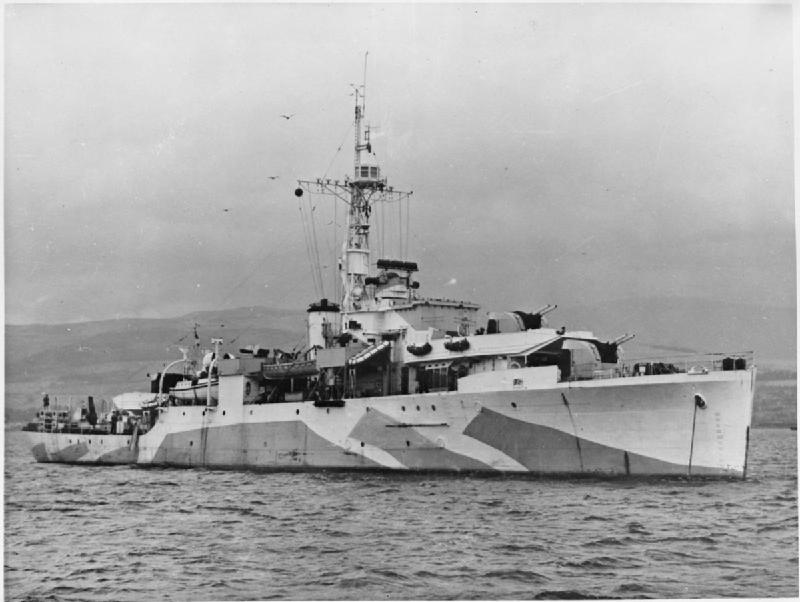
- HMS Amethyst, photographed during the Second World War
Date	20 April – 30 July 1949
Location	Jiangyin, China 32.3056°N 119.7196°E
Result	Chinese Communists Victory: British armed forces withdrawn from Yangtze River and mainland China

Belligerents
United Kingdom	Chinese Communists: (China) People's Liberation Army

Strength
HMS Amethyst; HMS Consort; HMS London; HMS Black Swan; HMS Concord	Small arms, field guns, artillery battery

Casualties and losses
Amethyst: 22 killed, 31 wounded, 1 cat wounded Consort: 10 killed, 23 wounded London: 15 killed, 13 wounded HMS Black Swan: 7 wounded	252

Amethyst incident
- Traditional Chinese: 紫石英號事件
- Simplified Chinese: 紫石英号事件
- Literal meaning: Amethyst ship Incident
Transcriptions
Standard Mandarin
- Hanyu Pinyin: zǐ shíyīng shìjiàn
Yue: Cantonese
- Jyutping: zi^{2} sek^{6} jing^{1} hou^{6} si^{6} gin^{2}

The Amethyst incident, also known as the Yangtze incident, was a three-month international confrontation on the Yangtze River in the summer of 1949 during the late phase of the Chinese Civil War. The incident involved the Communist People's Liberation Army (PLA), who were in the process of a river-crossing offensive to overthrow the Nationalist Government, and four British Royal Navy ships HMS Amethyst, HMS Black Swan, HMS Consort and HMS London. The British warships, whose claimed right of passage along the Yangtze had been unchallenged since the 1858 Treaty of Tientsin with the late Qing dynasty, came under bombardment by PLA artillery and were forced to withdraw permanently from Chinese territorial waters.

The incident was described in the British press as a dramatic escape, while in China it was celebrated by senior Communist officials such as Mao Zedong and Peng Dehuai, who viewed the incident as the end of foreign imperialism in China.

== Description ==
On 20 April 1949, during the Chinese Civil War between the nationalist Kuomintang-led Republic of China and the Chinese Communist Party, the Royal Navy sloop HMS Amethyst, commanded by Lieutenant Commander Bernard Skinner, was cruising on the river Yangtze from Shanghai to Nanjing, (Note: Nanjing was then romanized as Nanking and is situated on the Yangtze River) to replace HMS Consort, which had been posted as guard ship for the British Embassy there. According to the Royal Navy, at about 08:31, after a burst of small arms fire, a People's Liberation Army (PLA) field gun battery on the north bank of the river fired a salvo of ten shells to warn Amethyst to stay away from the war zone. The salvo fell well short of the ship, and was assumed by the ship's officers to be part of a regular bombardment of Nationalist forces on the south bank. Therefore, Amethyst ignored the warning and continued to cruise towards Nanjing. Speed was increased, and a large Union Flag was unfurled on each side of the ship, after which there was no more firing from this battery.

=== Initial damage and grounding ===
At 09:30, as Amethyst approached Jiangyin (then romanised as Kiangyin) further up the river, it received sustained fire from a second PLA battery, as the PLA may have considered that the ship had violated the "stay away warning" from the war zone; additionally, the PLA may have thought Amethyst might attack and therefore began firing without having been fired upon.

The first shell passed over the ship. Then the bridge, wheelhouse and low power room were hit in quick succession, Lieutenant Commander Skinner was wounded mortally, and all the bridge personnel were disabled. The coxswain on the wheel, Leading Seaman Leslie Frank, was seriously injured and, as a result, the ship slewed to port and grounded on the river's bank. Before the ship grounded, the order to open fire had been given, but when the director layer pulled the firing trigger, nothing happened because the firing circuits were disabled when the low power room was hit.

Lieutenant Geoffrey L. Weston, the ship's first lieutenant, assumed command of the vessel, although he was also wounded himself. PLA shells exploded in the sick bay, the port engine room, and finally the generator, just after the injured Weston's last transmission: "Under heavy fire. Am aground in approx. position 31.10' North 119.20' East. Large number of casualties". (Note: Weston gave the wrong latitude in this report; in fact the ship was at 32° 20′N, not 31° 10′N. This could be an error made by the wounded Weston; it could be a transcription error by the signalman; or it could be an error in reading the logs after the event.)

The order was given to fire in local control with each turret firing independently, but Amethyst had grounded in such a way that neither of the two forward gun turrets could bring their guns to bear on the PLA batteries, leaving the single stern turret to return fire. This turret was soon hit and disabled. None of the close-range weapons could be brought to bear on the PLA batteries. The shore batteries continued to bombard Amethyst causing more damage and casualties aboard.

=== Attempted evacuation ===
Some time between 10:00 and 10:30, Weston ordered the immediate evacuation to shore of anyone who could be spared. A boat was manned to take people the short distance to shore and some men swam ashore. The PLA batteries switched their fire to the men being evacuated and further evacuation was stopped. Fifty-nine ratings and four Chinese mess boys made it to the Kuomintang-controlled southern bank, but two men were assumed drowned while swimming ashore. Those who survived were joined by the seriously wounded from Amethyst who had been landed by sampan, with the assistance of the Chinese Nationalists the next day. Both parties were taken to a missionary hospital in Jiangyin, where they were met by a party from the British Embassy in Nanjing, and put on a train for Shanghai. Remaining aboard were about 60 unwounded men. The shelling had stopped, but no one could move on deck without drawing the attention of PLA snipers.

=== Assistance from Consort ===
By the time the shelling stopped at about 11:00, 22 men had been killed and 31 wounded. Amethyst had received more than 50 hits and holes below the waterline were plugged with hammocks and bedding. Rear Admiral Alexander Madden, the second in command of the East Indies Fleet, ordered the destroyer HMS Consort (Commander Robertson) to go from Nanjing, to Amethyst's assistance, and the frigate HMS Black Swan (Captain Jay) to go from Shanghai to Jiangyin, 40 mi (64 km) down river from Amethyst. Consort was sighted, flying seven White Ensigns and three Union flags, steaming down from Nanjing, at 29 kn (54 km/h; 33 mph).

Consort reached Amethyst at about 15:00 and was immediately bombarded. The shelling was too heavy to approach Amethyst and Consort therefore passed the other ship at cruising speed down river. Consort then turned two miles (3.2 km) and again closed on Amethyst to take the ship in tow, but Consort was again bombarded so intensely that it was obliged to abandon the attempt, although it answered the shore batteries with its full armament (including 4.5-inch (114 mm) guns) and soon signalled that it had silenced most of the opposition. Half an hour later Consort made a second attempt to take Amethyst in tow, having turned downstream again. This attempt also failed and Consort sustained further damage and casualties during which the ship's steering was affected. Consort therefore had to continue downstream out of the firing area with 10 men killed and 23 wounded.

=== Refloating and the arrival of Lieutenant Commander Kerans ===
Amethyst was re-floated just after midnight on 21 April, after the ship was lightened, and it moved up river. The Assistant British Naval Attaché, Lieutenant Commander John Kerans, joined the ship on 22 April, after he had dealt with all the wounded and unwounded men who had been sent ashore. He assumed command of the ship that day.

During the next few days Amethyst moved several times, but each time it moved the batteries bombarded the ship which was finally forced to anchor off Fu Te Wei.

=== Attempted assistance from London and Black Swan ===
On 21 April, a signal was received: "HM ships London and Black Swan are moving up river to escort the Amethyst down stream. Be ready to move." The cruiser HMS London, alongside Black Swan, were bombarded intensely as they attempted to help Amethyst, and retreated with 3 killed and 14 wounded.

=== Negotiations ===
On 30 April 1949, the Chinese Communists demanded that Britain, the United States, and France quickly withdraw their armed forces from any part of China. During the negotiations the Communists insisted that the British ship fired first. Eventually, in 1988, the PLA commander Ye Fei, admitted that it was his troops that fired first, thinking it was an American naval intervention. Amethyst remained guarded by the PLA for ten weeks, with vital supplies being withheld from the ship. Negotiations were ineffectual because Kerans would not accept the demand of Kang Yushao, the Chinese Communist representative, that he admit the British state had wrongly invaded Chinese national waters (the Communists insisted that it was illegal for Amethyst to cruise in the Yangtze River).

=== Escape ===
On 30 July 1949, Amethyst's chain was slipped and the ship headed downriver in the dark, beginning a dash to escape from the Yangtze River by following in the wake of the civilian ship Kiang Ling Liberation, a fully-lit passenger vessel carrying Chinese refugees, allegedly in the hope that the observers ashore would be confused and not see the frigate in the dark, and to follow the path through the shoals taken by Kiang Ling Liberation. The movement of both ships was spotted, and both were challenged. The Kiang Ling Liberation answered correctly, whereas Amethyst, upon being challenged, opened fire. When the shore batteries replied, a PLA gunboat in the river began to fire back at the shore. In the confusion the Kiang Ling Liberation blacked out its lights while the Amethyst sped past.

At 05:00 on 31 July, Amethyst approached the PLA forts at Baoshan and Wusong, which had their searchlights sweeping the river. At 05:25 a planned meeting with the destroyer HMS Concord occurred, at which time Amethyst sent the signal "Have rejoined the fleet south of Wusong. No damage. No casualties. God save the King".

Concord had been ordered to prepare to provide gun support to Amethyst if it was bombarded by the shore batteries at Wusong. To achieve this it had moved up the Yangtze during the night, at action stations. Fortunately for the British, Amethyst was not detected by the shore batteries and the two ships then proceeded downriver until at 07:15 they ended action stations and after passing through the river's outlet arrived at the Saddle Islands at 12:00 to anchor and transfer much needed oil and stores.

After a brief stay at anchor, Concord transferred members of her own crew to Amethyst to augment the ship's company, and the two ships proceeded to Hong Kong. Next day the cruiser HMS Jamaica (flying the flag of the Flag Officer Second in Command Far East Fleet) and destroyer HMS Cossack replaced Concord as escort and proceeded with Amethyst to Hong Kong. Concord was sent to Japan, after its complement was sworn to secrecy. Amethyst subsequently received a message of congratulations from King George VI:

Please convey to the commanding officer and ship's company of HMS AMETHYST my hearty congratulations on their daring exploit to rejoin the Fleet. The courage, skill and determination shown by all on board have my highest commendation. Splice the mainbrace.

=== Aftermath ===
On 5 August 1949, Lt Cdr Kerans was awarded the Distinguished Service Order for his actions in bringing Amethyst to safety. The future Governor of Hong Kong, Edward Youde, was part of the staff of the British Embassy at Nanjing. He negotiated unsuccessfully for the release of Amethyst. Youde was later made a Member of the Order of the British Empire for his actions. Amethyst had a ship's cat, named Simon, who was wounded seriously during the event. After receiving medical care, he recovered and continued to perform his duties catching rats, protecting the dwindling food supply during the 101-day siege and helped boost morale for the surviving sailors. Simon died soon after returning to the UK, having been awarded the Dickin Medal (sometimes referred to as "the animals' Victoria Cross"). He remains the only cat to receive this honour.

Chairman Mao Zedong considered the incident a great victory for the Chinese nation. Peng Dehuai later remarked: "The era where Imperialists take over a piece of Asia by simply stacking a few guns, is over and never to return!" Many of the Nationalist troops on the south bank cheered the Communists as they bombarded the British warships. During the subsequent river crossing, many Nationalist defenders either surrendered, deserted or defected with negligible resistance.
