= HMS Consort =

C-class destroyer

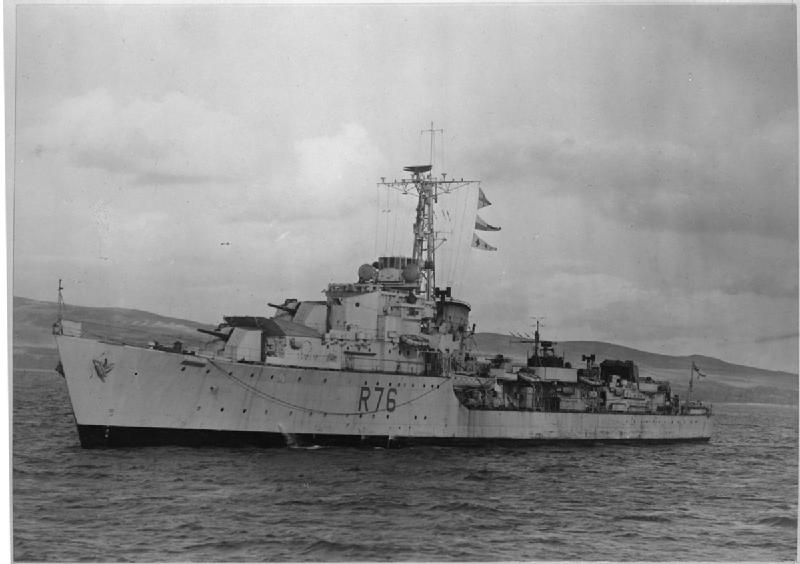
- Consort on the River Clyde in 1946

History

United Kingdom
- Name: Consort
- Ordered: 14 August 1942
- Builder: Alexander Stephen & Sons, Linthouse
- Laid down: 26 May 1943
- Launched: 19 October 1944
- Commissioned: 19 March 1946
- Identification: Pennant number: R76
- Fate: Arrived for scrapping at Swansea on 15 March 1961

General characteristics (as built)
- Class & type: C-class destroyer
- Displacement: 1,865 long tons (1,895 t) (standard)
- Length: 362 ft 9 in (110.6 m) o/a
- Beam: 35 ft 8 in (10.9 m)
- Draught: 15 ft 3 in (4.6 m) (full load)
- Installed power: 2 Admiralty 3-drum boilers; 40,000 shp (30,000 kW)
- Propulsion: 2 shafts; 2 geared steam turbines
- Speed: 36 knots (67 km/h; 41 mph)
- Range: 4,675 nautical miles (8,658 km; 5,380 mi) at 20 knots (37 km/h; 23 mph)
- Complement: 186
- Armament: 4 × single 4.5 in (114 mm) DP guns; 1 × twin 40 mm (1.6 in) AA gun; 2 × single 2-pdr (40 mm) AA guns; 2 × single 20 mm (0.8 in) AA guns; 2 × quadruple 21 in (533 mm) torpedo tubes; 2 throwers and 2 racks for 35 depth charges

HMS Consort was one of thirty-two C-class destroyers built for the Royal Navy during the Second World War, a member of the eight-ship Co sub-class.

== Design and description ==
The Co sub-class was a repeat of the preceding Ch sub-class. Consort displaced 1,865 long tons (1,895 t) at standard load and 2,515 long tons (2,555 t) at deep load. They had an overall length of 362 feet 9 inches (110.6 m), a beam of 35 feet 8 inches (10.9 m) and a deep draught of 15 feet 3 inches (4.6 m).

The ships were powered by a pair of geared steam turbines, each driving one propeller shaft using steam provided by two Admiralty three-drum boilers. The turbines developed a total of 40,000 indicated horsepower (30,000 kW) and gave a speed of 36 knots (67 km/h; 41 mph) at normal load. During her sea trials, Consort reached a speed of 31.6 knots (58.5 km/h; 36.4 mph) at a load of 2,356 long tons (2,394 t). The Co sub-class carried enough fuel oil to give them a range of 4,675 nautical miles (8,658 km; 5,380 mi) at 20 knots (37 km/h; 23 mph). The ships' complement was 186 officers and ratings.

The main armament of the destroyers consisted of four QF 4.5-inch (114 mm) Mk IV dual-purpose guns, one superfiring pair each fore and aft of the superstructure protected by partial gun shields. Their anti-aircraft suite consisted of one twin-gun stabilised Mk IV "Hazemeyer" mount for 40-millimetre (1.6 in) Bofors guns and two single 2-pounder (40 mm) AA guns amidships, and single mounts for a 20-millimetre (0.8 in) Oerlikon AA gun on the bridge wings. The ships were fitted with one quadruple mount for 21-inch (533 mm) torpedo tubes. The ships were equipped with a pair of depth charge rails and two throwers for 35 depth charges.

== Construction and career ==
Consort was ordered from Alexander Stephens & Sons and the ship was laid down on 26 May 1943 at its shipyard in Linthouse, launched on 19 October 1944 and was commissioned on 19 March 1946.

Consort was damaged by artillery fire during the Yangtze Incident in an attempt to tow the sloop Amethyst from a mudbank, taking 56 direct hits, and causing casualties of 23 wounded and a further ten dead.

Following decommissioning she was sold to the Prince of Wales Drydock Co., of Swansea, Wales, for scrap and arrived there on 15 March 1961.

== Bibliography ==
- Chesneau, Roger, ed. (1980). Conway's All the World's Fighting Ships 1922–1946. Greenwich, UK: Conway Maritime Press. ISBN 0-85177-146-7.
- Colledge, J. J.; Warlow, Ben (2006) [1969]. Ships of the Royal Navy: The Complete Record of All Fighting Ships of the Royal Navy from the 15th Century to the Present (3rd Rev ed.). London: Chatham Publishing. ISBN 978-1-86176-281-8. OCLC 67375475.
- English, John (2001). Obdurate to Daring: British Fleet Destroyers 1941–45. Windsor, UK: World Ship Society. ISBN 978-0-9560769-0-8.
- Friedman, Norman (2006). British Destroyers and Frigates, the Second World War and After. Annapolis, Maryland: Naval Institute Press. ISBN 1-86176-137-6.
- Lenton, H. T. (1998). British & Empire Warships of the Second World War. Annapolis, Maryland: Naval Institute Press. ISBN 1-55750-048-7.
- March, Edgar J. (1966). British Destroyers: A History of Development, 1892–1953; Drawn by Admiralty Permission From Official Records & Returns, Ships' Covers & Building Plans. London: Seeley Service. OCLC 164893555.
- Marriott, Leo (1989). Royal Navy Destroyers Since 1945. Ian Allan. ISBN 0-7110-1817-0.
- Whitley, M. J. (1988). Destroyers of World War Two: An International Encyclopedia. Annapolis, Maryland: Naval Institute Press. ISBN 0-87021-326-1.
