= HMS Amethyst (F116) =

Sloop of the Royal Navy

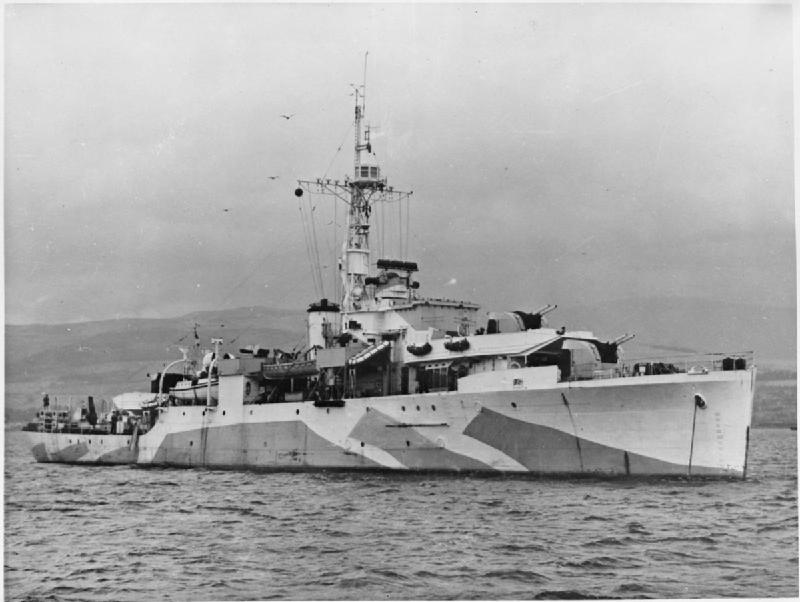
- Amethyst during the Second World War

History

United Kingdom
- Name: HMS Amethyst
- Builder: Alexander Stephen and Sons, Govan
- Laid down: 25 March 1942
- Launched: 7 May 1943
- Commissioned: 2 November 1943
- Identification: Pennant number: U16 (later F116)
- Fate: Scrapped 19 January 1957

General characteristics
- Class & type: Modified Black Swan-class sloop
- Displacement: 1,350 tons
- Length: 283 ft (86 m)
- Beam: 38.5 ft (11.7 m)
- Propulsion: Geared turbines; Two shafts
- Speed: 20 knots (37 km/h) at 4,300 hp (3,200 kW)
- Complement: 192 men + 1 cat
- Armament: 6 × QF 4 in Mk XVI anti-aircraft guns; 12 × 20 mm anti-aircraft guns

HMS Amethyst was a modified Black Swan-class sloop of the Royal Navy. She was laid down by Alexander Stephen and Sons of Linthouse, Govan, Scotland on 25 March 1942, launched on 7 May 1943 and commissioned on 2 November 1943, with the pennant number U16. After the Second World War she was modified and redesignated as a frigate, and renumbered F116.

== Second World War ==
During the Second World War, Amethyst was deployed mostly on anti-submarine patrols and escort duties. She attacked and sank the U-boat U-1276 with depth charges on 20 February 1945. U-1276 had just sunk HMS Vervain, a Flower-class corvette, with the loss of 60 crew. The action took place in the North Atlantic, south of Waterford, and resulted in the loss of all 49 of the U-boat's crew.

During the war Amethyst was credited, along with the sloops Starling, Peacock, Hart, and frigate Loch Craggie, with sinking the German submarine U-482 in the North Channel on 16 January 1945. The British Admiralty withdrew this credit in a post-war reassessment.

== The Amethyst incident ==
On 20 April 1949, Amethyst was on her way from Shanghai to Nanking (now Nanjing) when she was fired upon by the People's Liberation Army. This became known as the Amethyst incident. Amethyst was trapped in China until 30 July 1949, when she escaped under cover of darkness.

For the 1957 film Yangtse Incident: The Story of H.M.S. Amethyst, Amethyst was brought out of reserve to play herself. As the engines were no longer operational, her sister ship Magpie was used for shots of the ship moving. Amethyst was scrapped shortly after the filming was finished.

== See also ==
- Lieutenant-Commander John Kerans
- Simon (cat)

== General and cited references ==
- Colledge, J. J.; Warlow, Ben (2006) [1969]. Ships of the Royal Navy: The Complete Record of All Fighting Ships of the Royal Navy from the 15th Century to the Present (3rd Rev ed.). London: Chatham Publishing. ISBN 978-1-86176-281-8. OCLC 67375475.
- Hague, Arnold (1993). Sloops: A History of the 71 Sloops Built in Britain and Australia for the British, Australian and Indian Navies 1926–1946. Kendal, England: World Ship Society. ISBN 0-905617-67-3.
