= Submarine Squadron (Poland) =

Historic military unit of the Polish Navy

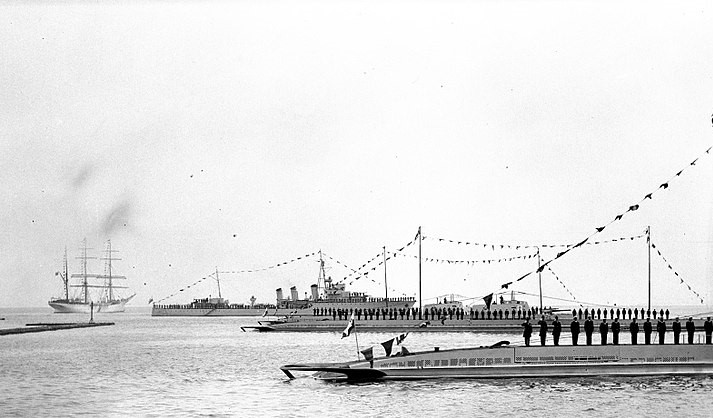
- Active: May 1, 1932–September 11, 1939
- Country: Poland
- Allegiance: Fleet commander
- Type: navy
- Garrison/HQ: Gdynia Naval Port
- Engagements: Battle of Danzig Bay

Commanders
- First commander: Lieutenant Commander Eugeniusz Pławski
- Last commander: Lieutenant Commander Aleksander Mohuczy

Submarine Squadron was a tactical unit of the Polish Navy that was part of the Fleet, established on 30 April 1932 by order no. 724 of the Chief of the Naval Command as the Submarine Boats Squadron. On 23 September 1937, the unit's name was changed to the Submarine Squadron.

The unit was directly commanded successively by Lieutenant Commander Eugeniusz Pławski and Lieutenant Commander Aleksander Mohuczy. Legally, the squadron functioned as an administrative unit subordinate to the Fleet captain. Its composition included the submarines ORP Ryś, ORP Wilk, and ORP Żbik, the torpedo boat ORP Kujawiak, and the hulk Lwów. Starting in November 1938, ORP Sławomir Czerwiński began serving as a permanent base for the squadron. In 1939, the squadron was supplemented with two new Orzeł-class submarines, ORP Orzeł and ORP Sęp. The squadron's permanent base was the Gdynia Naval Port, and the squadron captain reported directly to Fleet captain Rear Admiral Józef Unrug. The submarines participated in goodwill visits to Stockholm, Helsinki, Amsterdam, Oslo, Copenhagen, Karlskrona, Tallinn, and Narva.

In September 1939, all submarines of the squadron participated in the defense of the Polish coast. However, instead of engaging in offensive operations for which they were suited, they executed primarily defensive operational plans, Worek and Rurka, focusing on the circular defense of Hel as the Fleet's main base. Consequently, during the initial days of the war, all squadron units were detected, tracked, and attacked by small surface ships and aircraft, and occasionally by U-boats. These encounters caused significant damage to the submarines and strained the crews' mental condition. As a result, ORP Żbik, ORP Ryś, and ORP Sęp were interned in Sweden, while ORP Wilk and ORP Orzeł managed to evade the German blockade and reached the United Kingdom. These events marked the end of the squadron's existence.

== Formation and organization of the squadron ==
After the arrival of the first two newly built Wilk-class submarines – ORP Ryś (19 August 1931) and ORP Wilk (25 November 1931) – the Chief of the Naval Command issued an order on 9 December 1931 to form a submarine group under the joint command of Captain Aleksander Mohuczy, the captain of Wilk.

Following the arrival of the third new unit, ORP Żbik, from France on 15 March 1932, the Chief of the Naval Command issued a directive on 30 April 1932, establishing a new tactical unit of the Fleet called the Submarine Boats Squadron, effective 1 May 1932. (Note: The fleet was the strongest operational unit of the navy, subordinate to the Naval Command (Rudzki (1985, pp. 63–64)).) Due to an official change in naval terminology, on 23 September 1937, the squadron was renamed the Submarine Squadron, and submarines of this class were thereafter referred to as submarines.

=== Organization ===
The division was an administrative unit formally subordinated to the Fleet captain. The division captain, holding the rank of lieutenant commander, directly reported to the Fleet captain and had disciplinary powers similar to those of a regiment captain. From the moment the unit was established, the division captain was appointed Lieutenant Commander Eugeniusz Pławski. The command staff also included officers: flagship, signal, navigator, underwater weapon, mechanic, and electrician.

As a result of the explosion of rechargeable batteries aboard Ryś on 1 April 1936, a change occurred in the division's command structure. Lieutenant Commander Aleksander Mohuczy replaced Captain Pławski, who took up the position of Head of Underwater Weapons at the Naval Command in Warsaw. The captains of the submarines directly reported to the division captain.

Commanders of the Submarine Division
| Lieutenant Commander Eugeniusz Pławski | 1 May 1932 | 6 July 1936 |
| Lieutenant Commander Aleksander Mohuczy | 6 July 1936 | 2 October 1939 |

==== Commanders of the ships and their deputies on 31 August 1939 ====
| Ship class | Ship name | Hull number | Commission date | Commander | Deputy Commander |
|---|---|---|---|---|---|
| Wilk | Wilk | W | 31 October 1931 | Lieutenant Commander Bogusław Krawczyk | Lieutenant Commander Borys Karnicki |
| Wilk | Ryś | R | 2 August 1931 | Lieutenant Commander Aleksander Grochowski | Lieutenant Commander Jerzy Rekner |
| Wilk | Żbik | Ż | 20 February 1932 | Lieutenant Commander Michał Żebrowski | Lieutenant Commander Wilhelm Kamuda |
| Orzeł | Orzeł | | 2 February 1939 | Lieutenant Commander Henryk Kłoczkowski | Lieutenant Commander Jan Grudziński |
| Orzeł | Sęp | | 16 April 1939 | Lieutenant Commander Władysław Salamon | Lieutenant Commander Justyn Karpiński |

In terms of function, the division was divided into two branches: ships and the base. The first branch focused on training ship crews both in motion and during stops. The main areas of training included operating main and auxiliary machinery, ship systems, and armament, maintenance and repairs of ships, watch duties, and carrying out training tasks at sea. The second branch handled all matters related to the crew's life on land, including satisfying the material and spiritual needs of the officers and sailors. The land base served for these tasks, where crews were transferred after returning from the sea, except during their watch duties on ships.

==== Ships of the division ====
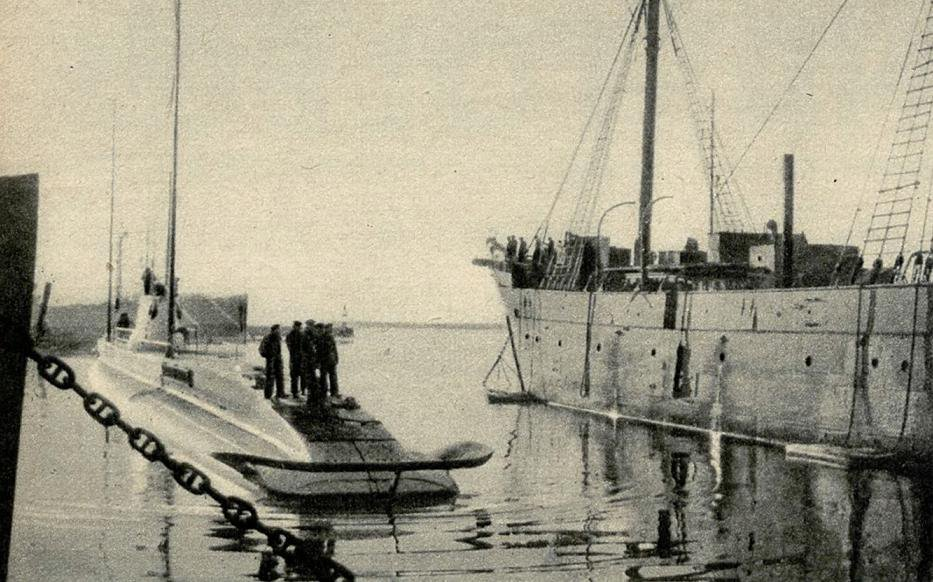
Submarine ORP Żbik moored next to the hulk Lwów

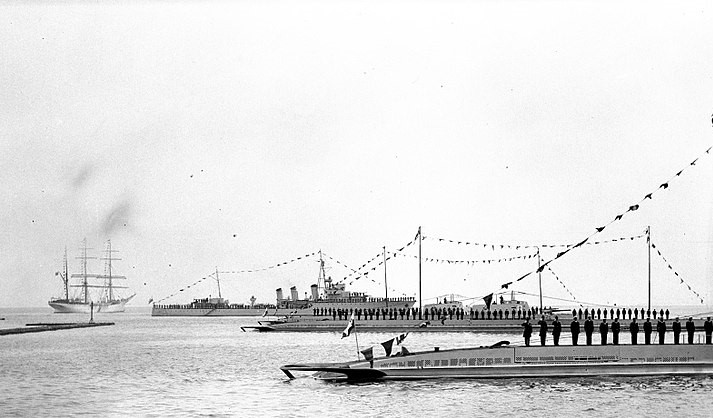
Submarine Division in its ceremonial flag-raising during the Sea Day celebration on 31 July 1932 in Gdynia. In the foreground, the stern of ORP Wilk is visible, followed by ORP Ryś and ORP Żbik. In the background, not part of the division, are the destroyer ORP Wicher and the sailing ship Dar Pomorza

In the early stages of its existence, the division consisted of the submarines ORP Wilk, ORP Żbik, and ORP Ryś, the torpedo boat ORP Kujawiak, and the hulk Lwów. ORP Kujawiak served as a target ship for torpedo training attacks, while the already old and worn-out sailing ship Lwów was designated on 22 August 1932 as floating barracks for the forming division. However, Lwów did not fully meet the needs of the unit, so on 15 November 1932, the passenger-cargo steamship ORP Sławomir Czerwiński was assigned as the permanent base for the future division. After the construction of a permanent land-based barracks, both units were removed from the Fleet's list of ships.

The initial Polish plans developed under the "Small Plan for Fleet Construction" envisioned the purchase of 9 submarines, but due to the fact that these units were to be built based on a French loan, French industrial lobbies, through corrupt actions, convinced French politicians to impose conditions on the loan's use that differed from Poland's expectations. Ultimately, instead of 9 submarines, France granted a loan for three submarines and two destroyers, which Poland did not intend to purchase from France, as it was not considered a technological leader in the production of such vessels at that time. However, the Naval Command did not abandon the idea of strengthening the submarine division with additional units, so from the beginning of 1939, newly built submarines constructed in the Netherlands according to Polish specifications for the Orzeł class began to join the division: ORP Orzeł and ORP Sęp. Shortly before the outbreak of the war, the Naval Command once again signed a contract with France for the construction of two additional submarines based on the Dutch-Polish Orzeł design. Despite negative past experiences, the decision to entrust the French shipyard with the construction was influenced by the strong pro-German sympathies already present in the Netherlands at the time. However, due to the outbreak of war, this contract was never realized, and in June 1940, after the German invasion of France, the hulls of the new submarines of the division were destroyed.

==== Base of the division ====
The home port and main support base for the submarines was the Gdynia Naval Port in Oksywie, where the Northern Basin was adapted for the division's needs. The administrator of this area and organizer of material and technical supplies was the Military Port Command of Gdynia. The command was responsible for providing essential equipment, fuels, food, and other materials to the ships. To fulfill these tasks, the port commander had at his disposal technical, supply, armament, submarine weapons, navigational supply, communications, automotive, and medical services, as well as repair shops and facilities. The port commander was also the direct superior of the hulk ORP Bałtyk, which housed the Fleet Specialist Training Center and the Fleet Personnel, which was the parent unit responsible for training newly recruited personnel.

In 1937, barracks blocks were built near the division's basin, designed by Professor Marian Lalewicz. The total area of the barracks, training, administrative, and staff rooms built in the 1930s was 4,919 m². The division also included an infirmary and an administrative and economic section, both managed by officers. As part of cost-saving measures in the navy in 1935, the administrative and economic section was disbanded, and an officer of the supply service was assigned to the unit's command to advise on quartermaster matters.

==== Personnel ====
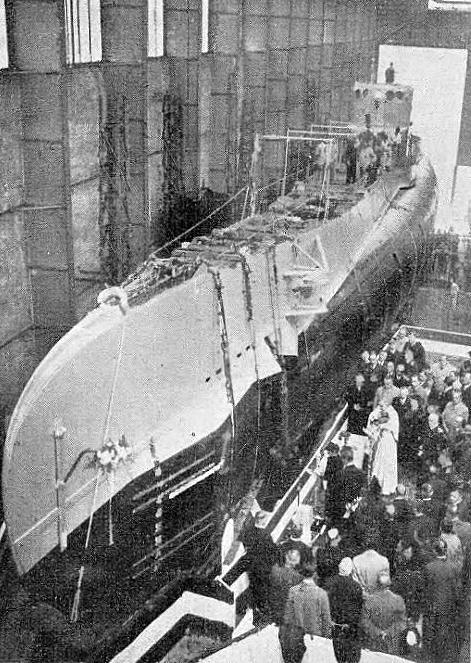
In the 1930s, efforts were made to increase the offensive potential of the division. In the photo, a ceremony of launching another new submarine, ORP Sęp, is shown

When forming the submarine division, the Chief of the Naval Command established the personnel composition at 24 officers and 192 non-commissioned officers and sailors. Of the total number of 216 people, 162 officers, non-commissioned officers, and sailors were part of the active crews of the submarines. However, the high technical level of the ships meant that not only officers and non-commissioned officers but also a significant portion of the sailors had to possess specialized qualifications, which were impossible or very difficult to achieve during the two-year compulsory military service. Therefore, the crews of the submarines consisted to a much greater extent than personnel in other units of professional and extended service personnel. Professional non-commissioned officers made up 40%, extended service non-commissioned officers and sailors made up 50%, and sailors on compulsory service made up only 10% of the crews.

The specialized training was also facilitated by the fact that sailors volunteered for submarine service, and they were generally individuals with a higher than average general education – every crew member of such a ship had to have completed at least seven grades of elementary school and vocational secondary school. This made the structure of the navy distinct from the rest of the armed forces, with the submarine division differing from other units within it.

The compulsory military service on submarines lasted 27 months, both for conscript sailors and volunteers. Its terms were defined by the decree of the President of the Republic of Poland of 7 March 1928 on the basic duties and rights of the naval servicemen and the decree of the Minister of Military Affairs of 12 September 1929 regulating the procedure for calling up and serving active duty, and from 1938 – compulsory service. In terms of territorial structure, nearly 50% of the division's personnel came from the Poznań and Warsaw voivodeships.

Extended service sailors were accepted into service after completing their compulsory service if they volunteered to join the extended service. Candidates for extended service committed to serving for another two years, after which they could extend their service annually. Professional service was open to those non-commissioned officers who volunteered and committed to serving at least 11 years. After this period, they could voluntarily extend their service for at least another three years.

The highest professional value for the navy came from the young professional non-commissioned officers, typically aged 24–35, who had undergone underwater training in France. As they gained experience, they became excellent specialists in their fields. They also acquired knowledge from "junior" and "senior" maritime specialist courses and completed non-commissioned officers' school. They were also characterized by a passion for naval service and high morale.

The primary role in creating and maintaining the division was also played by professional officers, who were responsible for training and leading the professional non-commissioned officers. The main role in the creation of the division was played by the part of the cadre that had previously served on the submarines of the partitioning states. The majority of them came from the Imperial Russian Navy: Aleksander Mohuczy, Eugeniusz Pławski, Edward Szystowski, and mechanics Alojzy Czosnowiecki, Hilary Sipowicz, and Zdzisław Śladkowski. The first commanders of Polish submarines supplemented their knowledge and skills in France, but over time, the commanders of submarines were officers who had acquired their naval education in Poland.

Thus, up until 1939, the following officers commanded the first Polish submarines: Wilk – Captains Aleksander Mohuczy, Brunon Jabłoński, Władysław Salamon, and Bogusław Krawczyk; Ryś – Captains Edward Szystowski, Andrzej Łoś, and Aleksander Grochowski; Żbik – Commander Eugeniusz Pławski, and Captains Henryk Kłoczkowski and Michał Żebrowski.

==== Training ====
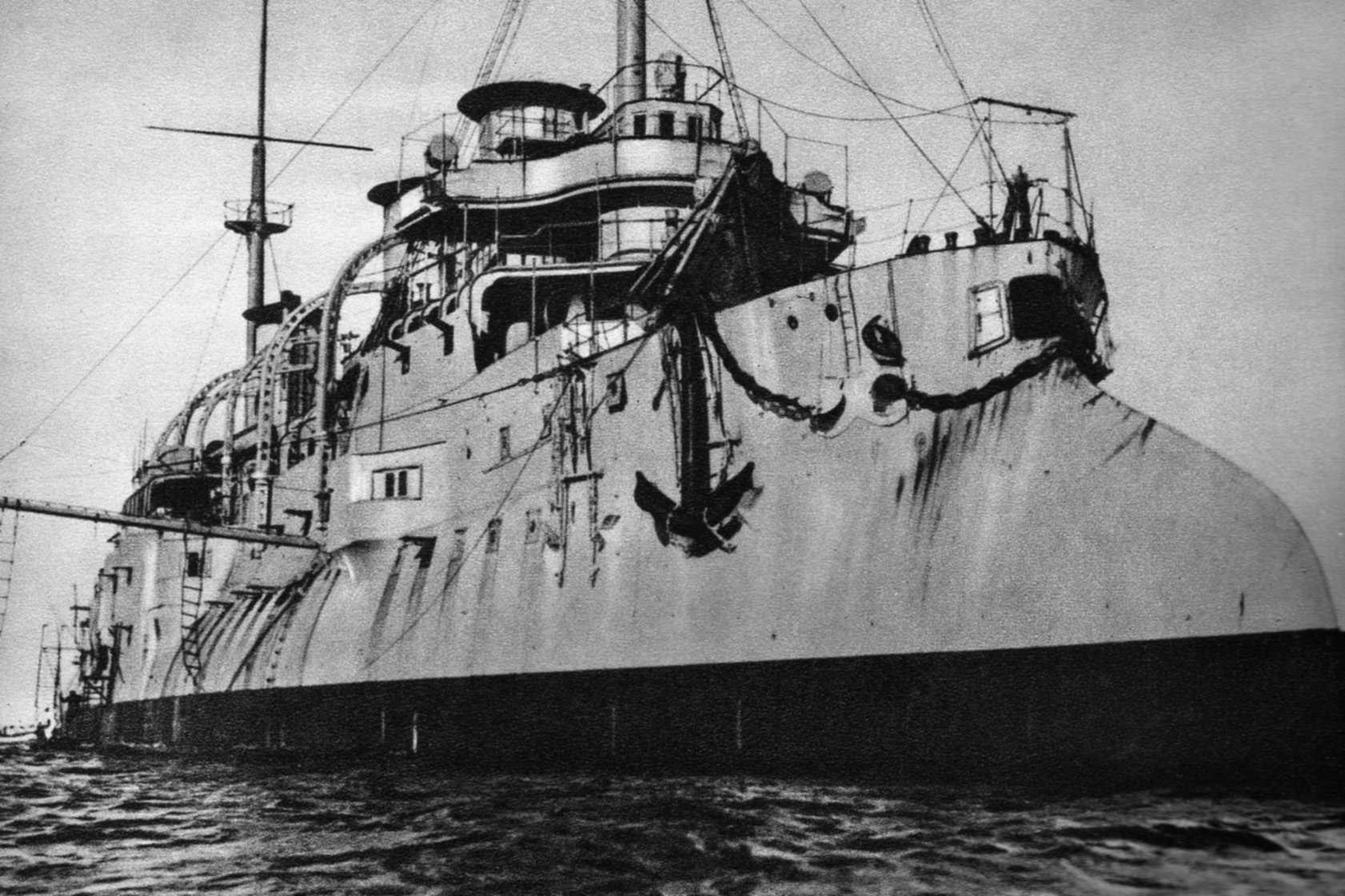
Ex-cruiser ORP Bałtyk in 1932. Since 1927, it housed the School for Maritime Specialists

Before being admitted to service on submarines, sailors had to undergo a three-month basic training in general military matters, conducted by the Fleet Cadre – the parent unit for all enlisted personnel serving on the navy ships. The necessary theoretical and practical knowledge for candidates to serve on submarines was obtained at the School for Maritime Specialists aboard the Bałtyk and on the ships of the training division, which included ORP Mazur, Kujawiak, Ślązak, Generał Sosnkowski, and the tugboat Lech. The course began with a three-week sea training session, which included rowing, sailing, general maritime knowledge, and the Ship Service Regulations. Both the division and the school ran courses for gunners, signalmen, torpedo miners, motor mechanics, drain operators, ship electricians, radiotelegraphers, medics, cooks, and administrative staff. Thanks to this type of training, sailors and non-commissioned officers acquired the theoretical preparation for submarine service, which was then supplemented by practical skills during special underwater swimming courses.

Due to the lack of Polish traditions in submarine service, the preparation of crews for the first submarines was entrusted to the prestigious French École de Navigation Sous-Marine in Toulon. It was planned to train a significantly larger number of individuals, but due to France's imposed limit on the number of ordered submarines (reduced from 9 to 3 in favor of ordering 2 destroyers), only 132 officers, non-commissioned officers, and sailors were trained in France. However, the training of these individuals abroad allowed the training of further soldiers within Poland. Among the first to be trained in France were naval captains – Mieczysław Janicz, Stanisław Lasocki, Aleksander Mohuczy, Eugeniusz Pławski, Mikołaj Szemiot, Edward Szystowski – and lieutenants – Brunon Jabłoński, Alfred Jougan, Henryk Kłoczkowski, Andrzej Łoś, Radosław Nowakowski, and Władysław Salamon. After completing their training, these officers were engaged as instructors at the Polish School of Underwater Swimming in Toulon aboard the old battleship Condorcet, which aimed to prepare a larger number of individuals, especially non-commissioned officers, for underwater swimming. Its commander was Captain Eugeniusz Pławski. The training of non-commissioned officers at the Polish School of Underwater Swimming in Toulon enabled the completion of crews for three minelayers with well-prepared specialists, and laid the foundation for training young specialists in the following years through several-month underwater swimming courses held in Poland.

After completing specialist training, from the early 1930s, officers, non-commissioned officers, and sailors were assigned to regular ship positions, where practical training at sea took place. This training was called the "application course" and took the form of an apprenticeship aboard the ship, where cadets – most often serving as watch officers – spent time in all departments of the ship (except the kitchen), as well as at strategic points in the naval base, in order to familiarize themselves with every aspect of service. The intensity of the training varied, increasing as the war threat grew. For example, in the first half of 1939, ORP Żbik went to sea three to four times a week, and the training of officers and crews was evaluated as excellent by the officers of the ships.

The overall training level of the division's submarine crews can be considered high – the submarines spent considerable time at sea, and part of the training took place during the division's foreign visits. From the perspective of the monthly sailing schedule during the training campaign, which included 120 hours in surface conditions and 30 hours submerged, as well as the range of individual exercises, it is assessed that the training in the Polish submarine fleet met all the training standards adopted in other navies. However, a notable shortcoming was limiting most exercises to the area north of Cape Rozewie. Furthermore, there is no documented evidence of exercises involving reconnaissance near naval bases and operational areas of potential enemy naval forces, except for activities near Baltiysk.

==== Provisioning of submarines ====
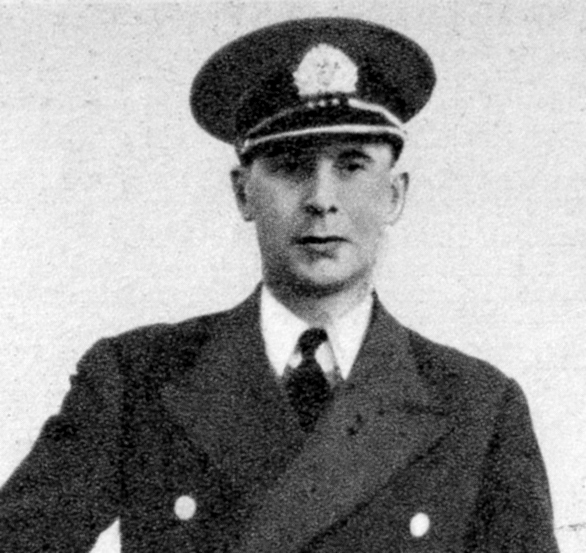
Captain Borys Karnicki, pictured in 1941 during his command of ORP Sokół

The food provisioning scheme for the division was developed by Captain Borys Karnicki, Deputy Head of the Organizational Department at Fleet Command. He devised a system for provisioning the Wilk-class submarines with food supplies intended for 35 days at sea. The scheme was based on a predetermined menu, specifying the quantities and costs, while adhering to a standardized caloric intake. After its approval, the scheme became the basis for a 42-day provisioning plan for the Orzeł-class submarines. On the eve of World War II, the submarines were equipped with 70 torpedoes of the 1924V model and 60 SM-5 anchor mines.

== Operational activity ==
=== Activities of the division in peacetime ===
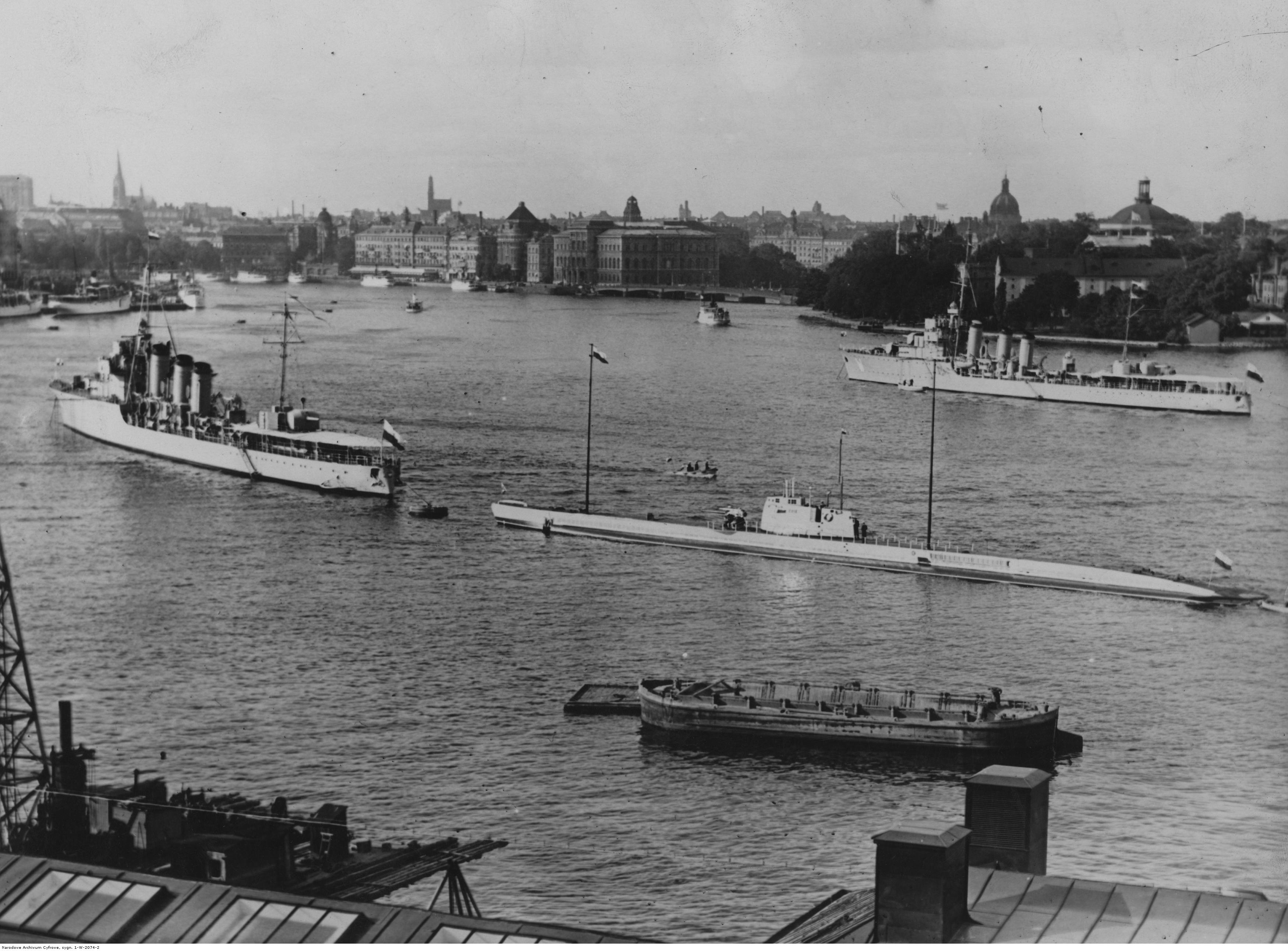
ORP Burza, Wicher, and Żbik entering the port of Stockholm in August 1932

In March 1939, after Commander Salamon left to take command of Sęp, Wilk had an incomplete crew, composed largely of new, not yet fully trained personnel. It was only at the turn of March and April that command of the vessel was taken over by Lieutenant Commander Bogusław Krawczyk. During this time, all four Polish submarines spent most of their time at sea, practicing regular and emergency dives, vessel balancing, and maneuvers both on the surface and underwater. While conducting simulated attacks, the crews trained torpedo assaults using random excursion and transport ships as targets. The vessels rarely returned to port during this period, often stopping only at the roadstead and maintaining contact with the shore exclusively via a small boat. The intensity of training in the second quarter of 1939 brought Wilk's crew performance level, assessed at 40% in March, up to an excellent rating by July. By then, the largely new crew was well bonded.

The vessels observed the Soviet fleet and German transport routes to East Prussia. The western and central Baltic Sea had been, since 1935, an area of very intense training for the development of Germany's submarine forces under then-Commander Karl Dönitz. At this time, the division had three operational submarines, which had to engage in training and reconnaissance activities in this region. However, it is difficult to ascertain today whether the results of these observations were used in any meaningful way, as there is no confirmation such observations even took place.

The division's submarines participated in goodwill visits: in August 1932, along with a pair of destroyers, the division visited Stockholm, and in March 1933, Ryś and Żbik undertook a voyage to Helsinki. The year 1934 was particularly rich in visits – in August, all three submarines visited Amsterdam and Oslo. On their return journey, in the Øresund strait, they rendezvoused with the destroyers ORP Burza and Wicher, and together, as a single group under the command of Captain Włodzimierz Steyer, made an unofficial visit to Copenhagen. On their return to Gdynia, the two divisions split again, with the destroyers returning to Gdynia while the submarine division called at Karlskrona, Sweden.

From 17 to 20 July 1935, the entire division, under the overall command of Captain Pławski, visited Tallinn. After a change in the division's leadership, on 14 August 1936, Wilk, Ryś, and Żbik, under the command of Commander Mohuczy, concluded exercises in the Baltic Sea with an unofficial visit to Narva, Estonia.

=== Wartime operations of the division ===
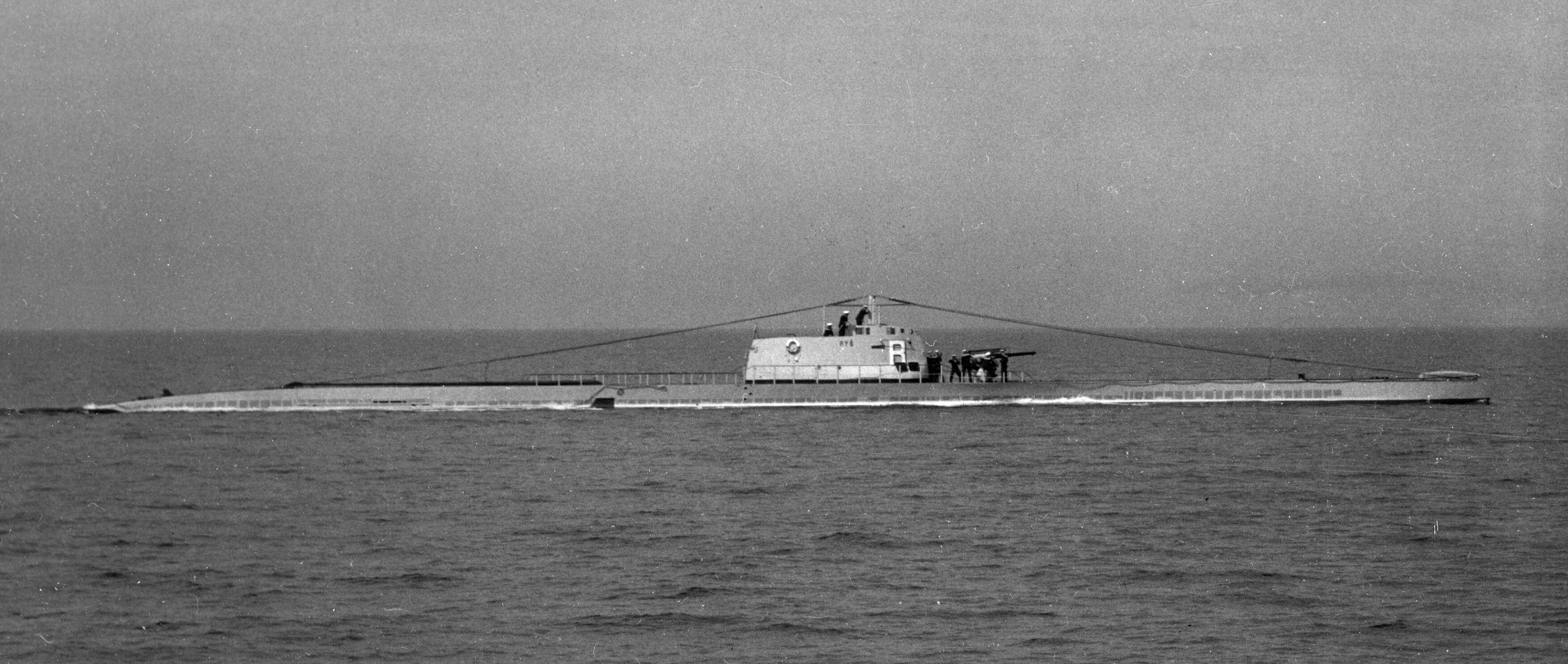
ORP Ryś in 1936

The division's operations in the defense of the coast during the September Campaign were based on one of the variants of the operational plan developed by Captain Aleksander Mohuczy, codenamed Worek. This plan envisioned the star-shaped deployment of submarines around the Hel Peninsula and the western part of the Gdańsk Bay to defend access to Hel. The second operational plan, Burza No. 2/N, which called for offensive action against German convoys between Świnoujście and East Prussia and the laying of active minefields in the southern Baltic Sea between Cape Rozewie, Bornholm, Oderbank, and the area off Świnoujście, was not utilized.

The Fleet and division command also did not adopt the British-suggested offensive actions targeting vital German maritime communication lines between German ports and the Swedish port of Luleå. This decision was likely influenced by an order from Marshal Edward Rydz-Śmigły to Rear Admiral Jerzy Świrski on 26 July 1939, directing the navy to "disrupt maritime communication between Germany and East Prussia, defend Hel as the primary base for the navy, and defend Gdynia". While this strategy was somewhat based on the reasonable assumption that bases are essential for effective fleet operations, in the specific conditions of war with Germany in 1939, defending these bases exceeded the Fleet's capabilities, as neither Hel nor Gdynia were fortified naval strongholds.

The operational plan set the objectives for Polish submarines in the event of war with Germany, the units required for its implementation, and the principles of their operations. The plan aimed to counter a potential German landing on the Hel Fortified Area, the Fleet's main base. To prevent an attack on Hel from the sea, the plan called for establishing a "permanent barrier" of five submarines in specific patrol sectors around the Hel Peninsula and the western Gdańsk Bay. The submarines were tasked with carrying out torpedo attacks on larger vessels – those bombarding Hel from maximum ranges or providing fire support during an attempted landing on the peninsula.

Commander Mohuczy's operational plan, outlined in Operational Order Signal No. 1, specified the division submarines' operational sectors, battery charging locations, and scheduled HF and LF communication sessions. Orzeł was assigned a sector within the Gdańsk Bay – specifically in the Bay of Puck, up to the Jastarnia-Vistula estuary line. East of this line, in Sector 27, ORP Wilk was to operate. The remaining three submarines were assigned sectors north of the Hel Spit: Sęp was to patrol between the meridians of the Stilo lighthouse to the west and 18°30' to the east, extending northward to the 55°12' parallel, 5 to 10 nautical miles north of Cape Rozewie. ORP Żbik (Sector 50) and Ryś (Sector 35) were positioned southeast of Sęp's sector. Operations in these sectors were to involve torpedo attacks on German vessels bombarding Hel or participating in amphibious warfare. According to international law, attacks on merchant ships were permitted only if the vessel was armed or traveling in convoy. In other cases, submarines were required to ensure the crew's evacuation, forcing the attacking submarine to surface, exposing it to detection and destruction.

==== Operations from 1 September 1939 ====
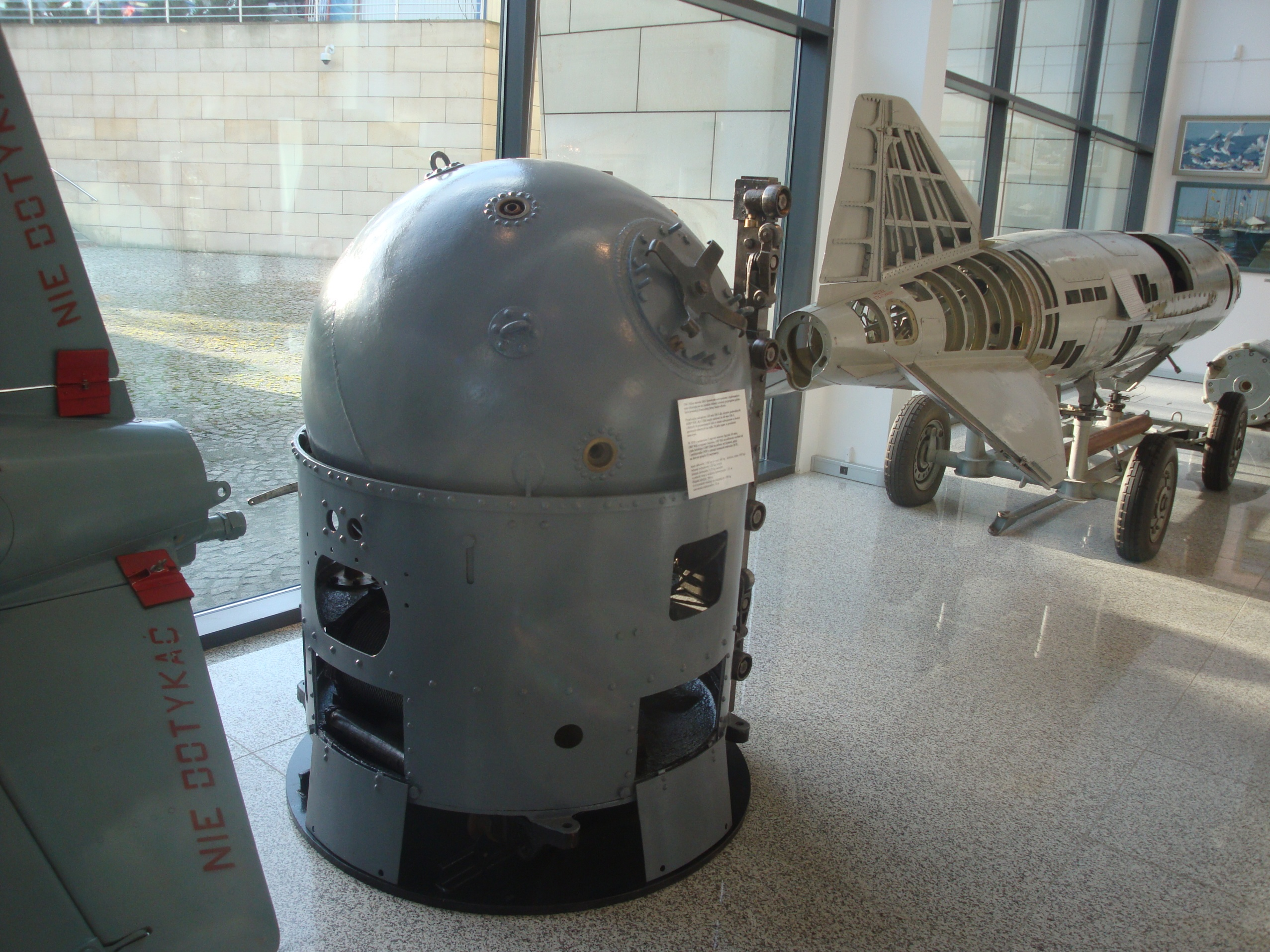
SM-5 naval mine during the September Campaign on the division's ships

The outbreak of war found the entire division in port, which must be considered a significant shortcoming of the Fleet Command. As a result of this error, the surprised ships were forced to move to their assigned patrol sectors while Germany was already conducting aerial and naval combat operations. It is only due to luck that no losses were suffered during this period. The deployment of all Polish vessels at a short distance from German air and naval bases led to them being detected, tracked, and attacked by small surface vessels and aircraft, and occasionally by U-boats. All the submarines were damaged, and the crews quickly began to feel physical and mental exhaustion from the continuous attacks.

On the night of September 2 to 3, the submarines received the order Rurka – Anna, Baran, Cal, which instructed them to lay mines. The responsibility for this task was assigned to Wilk, Ryś, and Żbik. The final execution of this order was delayed until September 8, when the last of the minefields was laid. This plan was closely related to the division's Worek Plan. Its execution encountered numerous technical and tactical problems, but only 50 mines were laid in three minefields – 20, 10, and 20 mines – which from a tactical standpoint was a very small number and had little operational effectiveness in defending the main base against an amphibious assault.

Polish submarines were not designed for laying large minefields. Given that they could carry a relatively small number of mines on each mission, they were better suited for specialized tasks, such as mining the approaches to enemy ports or areas with high enemy naval traffic. Large minefields were the domain of specialized surface ships. German documents suggest that the Germans expected Polish submarines to lay mines on the approaches to Piława, Świnoujście, Fehmarn Belt, and the Bay of Kiel, near their bases, where the German naval vessels passed, and where the use of submarine mine-layers was most practical and effective. Additionally, basic submarine tactics dictate that mines should be laid first, and then the submarines should proceed to offensive operations in their designated sectors.

The operational plan was highly defensive, and the poor deployment of the division units, combined with engagement rules, was exacerbated by several crew errors. On 3 September 1939, the German Type II submarine U-14, commanded by Lieutenant Horst Wellner, detected Sęp at 8:22 PM and fired a single G7a torpedo with a magnetic fuse. However, the torpedo exploded prematurely, too far from the Polish vessel. Unaware of the construction flaw in their magnetic fuses, which would later impact the results of the Norwegian campaign for U-boats, the Germans heard the explosion and assumed the Polish submarine had been destroyed. U-14 surfaced, and from the U-boat's conning tower, an oil slick and debris were spotted, confirming to Wellner that the Polish vessel had been sunk. He reported this to the Führer der Unterseeboote. This attack was officially recorded in German documents as the first attack by a German submarine during the war and the first sinking by the new generation of U-boats.

The Polish submarine's crew, surprised by the nearby torpedo explosion, did not notice the preparing U-boat in time. The explosion damaged the fuel tank and parts of the external structure, but the pressure hull remained intact, allowing Sęp to survive and submerge. The failure to detect the approaching U-boat was a serious error on the part of the crew, but it was only the malfunctioning German torpedo that prevented Sęp from being sunk along with its entire crew. On September 2, Sęp had attempted to attack the German Type 1934 destroyer Z14 Friedrich Ihn. While the detection and tracking of the target were exemplary, the decision to fire a single torpedo – especially from the rear torpedo tube – was a significant tactical error, possibly a result of a common practice preferred by senior submarine commanders, such as Commander Henryk Kłoczkowski of Orzeł.

The attack by U-14 on Sęp, as well as the attack by U-22 on Żbik on September 6, also highlighted deficiencies in visual observation quality. Nonetheless, Żbik, in carrying out the Rurka order in its assigned mining sector Cal, succeeded in laying a minefield. On October 1, the German minesweeper SMS M85 was sunk by one of these mines. From the crew of M-85, 24 people lost their lives. 47 survivors were rescued by the minesweeper M-122 and patrol boats.

Psychological exhaustion from continuous attacks led the commanders of Ryś and Orzeł to abandon their sectors. In Ryś' case, moving the submarine further north was justifiable, as its assigned sector was heavily impacted by the German blockade. However, in the case of Orzeł, leaving the Gdańsk Bay was considered an act of disobedience, as the commander withdrew without orders. This action was deemed highly inappropriate by the division's commander. The decision by Lieutenant Commander Aleksander Grochowski of Ryś to enter the Hel base, despite a clear ban, is more difficult to assess. However, given the psychological and physical state of the crew, as well as the fact that spare parts were available at the base and potential repairs could be carried out there, the commander's actions could be considered justified.

According to Admiral Józef Unrug, the submarine commanders, complaining about the lack of military targets in their assigned sectors, requested permission to torpedo German merchant ships, "which they constantly encounter and which sail safely and without hindrance in all directions". Despite understanding the political reasons behind the order to adhere to the London Protocol, the admiral stated that he had twice appealed to the head of the Navy Directorate for a revision of this decision. However, the rules of engagement were not changed, even at the cost of forgoing successes that Polish submarines might have achieved under different conditions.

The lack of targets permitted by orders and the continuous attacks by German anti-submarine forces in the designated operational sectors led to a shift in strategy. On September 5, with effect from September 7, the command altered the deployment of the units under the "Plan for Submarine Operations on Enemy Communication Lines" (without a codename), covering the area between the island of Bornholm and Cape Brüster Ort. However, due to erroneous reports about the sinking of several Polish submarines, the German command disregarded the existence of the Polish submarine division. On September 5, they lifted restrictions on shipping to East Prussia, while simultaneously mining the exits from the Baltic in neutral Danish and Swedish waters.

The new operational plan for Polish submarines also failed to achieve success, hindered by adherence to the London Protocol and the cautious approach of the submarine commanders. Additionally, the damaged Sęp and Żbik never reached their assigned sectors. Fuel reserves began to dwindle, and replenishing them or repairing minor damage at the Hel base was not feasible.

==== Internment of the submarines ====
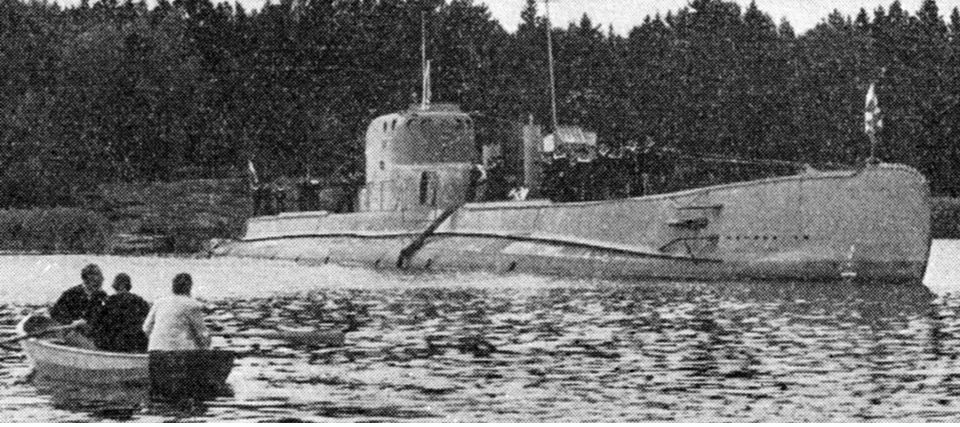
Sęp during the internment in November 1939

With the deteriorating situation for Polish submarines operating in the Baltic, from 11 September 1939, a radio message was broadcast instructing them either to make their way to allied Britain or, upon exhausting their supplies, to seek internment in Swedish ports. The commanders of individual submarines were left to independently decide their next actions. Captain Bogusław Krawczyk, commander of Wilk, opted to attempt the journey to the United Kingdom, while the commanders of Ryś, Żbik, and Sęp decided to head for Swedish ports. Contrary to orders, Commander Henryk Kłoczkowski, in charge of the fully operational Orzeł with substantial supplies, made for Tallinn, Estonia.

As a result of their commanders' decisions, all Polish submarines, except Wilk, were interned in accordance with international law at the time. Following the internment of Orzeł, the acting commander, Captain Jan Grudziński (since Commander Kłoczkowski, upon disembarking in Tallinn, did not formally hand over command), uniquely resisted internment. This defiance, while violating Article 24 of the 1907 Hague Convention and the Stockholm Declaration, proved beneficial for Poland's wartime interests. This highlights another error on the part of the Polish Navy Command and the Submarine Division leadership: the submarine commanders were not familiar with the legal constraints and conditions governing operations in the Baltic. As a result, they lacked full awareness of the situation and the consequences of their decisions.

Admiral Józef Unrug's order for the submarines to proceed to Britain after exhausting their operational possibilities in the Baltic was carried out by only two vessels: Wilk and Orzeł. Their commanders, Captain Bogusław Krawczyk and Captain Jan Grudziński, aged 33 and 32 respectively, were the youngest officers among the submarine commanders. Having been promoted in 1928, they had the shortest tenures and had remained overshadowed by their more senior counterparts before the war. However, in the wartime test, these younger commanders succeeded where others faltered. An exception was Commander Władysław Salamon of Sęp, whose submarine's technical condition made passage through Øresund impossible. Orzeł's arrival at the British naval base in Rosyth on 14 October 1939, along with its assignment alongside Wilk to the Second Submarine Flotilla, marked the end of the Polish Navy's Submarine Division's wartime operations.

== Bibliography ==
- Makowski, Andrzej (2012). "Dywizjon okrętów podwodnych Polskiej Marynarki Wojennej w kampanii wrześniowej. Ocena operacyjno-taktycznego użycia" [The Submarine Squadron of the Polish Navy in the September Campaign: An Assessment of Operational and Tactical Use]. Studia z Dziejów Polskiej Historiografii Wojskowej (in Polish). 13. ISSN 1234-2041.
- Pertek, Jerzy (2011). Wielkie Dni Małej Floty [The Great Days of the Small Fleet] (in Polish). Zysk i S-ka. ISBN 978-83-7785-707-6.
- Peszke, Michael Alfred (1999). Poland's Navy 1918–1945. New York: Hippocrene Books. ISBN 0-7818-0672-0.
- Rudzki, Czesław (1985). Polskie Okręty Podwodne 1926-1969 [Polish Submarines 1926–1969] (in Polish). Warsaw: MON. ISBN 83-11-07159-4.
- Śledziński, Kacper (2013). Odwaga straceńców. Polscy bohaterowie wojny podwodnej [The Courage of Daredevils: Polish Heroes of Submarine Warfare] (in Polish). Znak. ISBN 978-83-240-2774-3.
