= ORP Piorun (G65) =

Polish Navy destroyer

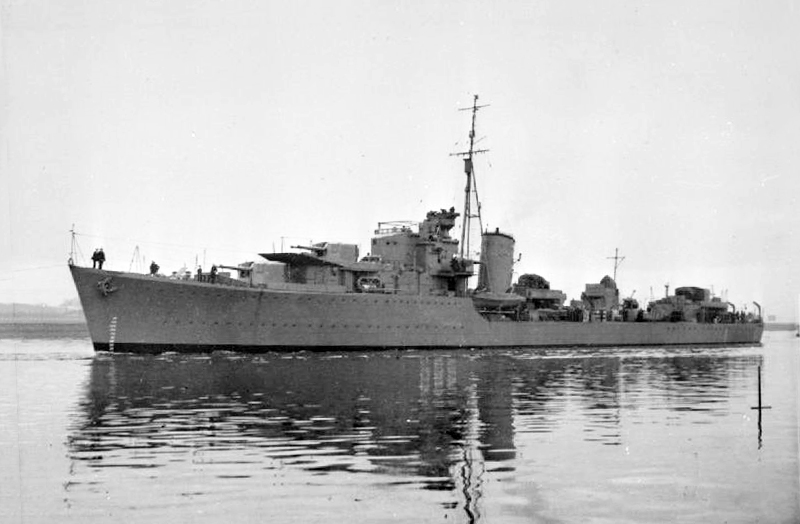
- ORP Piorun as HMS Noble after World War II

History

United Kingdom
- Name: Nerissa
- Operator: Royal Navy
- Ordered: 15 April 1939
- Builder: John Brown & Company, Clydebank
- Cost: £400,963.16s
- Laid down: 26 July 1939
- Launched: 7 May 1940
- Fate: Transferred to Polish Navy, October 1940

Poland
- Name: Piorun
- Namesake: Thunderbolt
- Operator: Polish Navy
- Completed: 4 November 1940
- Acquired: Transferred to Polish Navy, October 1940
- Commissioned: 4 November 1940
- Identification: Pennant number: G65
- Fate: Returned to Royal Navy, 1946

United Kingdom
- Name: Noble
- Acquired: August 1946
- Recommissioned: 26 October 1946
- Fate: Scrapped, 1955

General characteristics (as built)
- Class & type: N-class destroyer
- Displacement: 1,773 long tons (1,801 t) (standard); 2,384 long tons (2,422 t) (deep load)
- Length: 356 ft 6 in (108.7 m) (o/a)
- Beam: 35 ft 9 in (10.9 m)
- Draught: 12 ft 6 in (3.8 m)
- Installed power: 2 × Admiralty 3-drum boilers; 40,000 shp (30,000 kW)
- Propulsion: 2 shafts; 2 steam turbines
- Speed: 36 knots (67 km/h; 41 mph)
- Range: 5,500 nmi (10,200 km; 6,300 mi) at 15 knots (28 km/h; 17 mph)
- Complement: 183
- Sensors & processing systems: ASDIC; Type 285 gunnery radar; Type 286 radar surface-search radar
- Armament: 3 × twin 4.7 in (120 mm) guns; 1 × single 4 in (102 mm) AA gun; 4 × single 20 mm (0.8 in) Oerlikon AA guns; 2 × twin 0.5 in (12.7 mm) machine guns; 1 × quintuple 21 in (533 mm) torpedo tubes; 45 × depth charges, 1 × rack, 2 × throwers

ORP Piorun was an N-class destroyer operated by the Polish Navy in World War II. The word piorun is Polish for "Thunderbolt". Ordered by the Royal Navy in 1939, the ship was laid down as HMS Nerissa before being loaned to the Polish in October 1940 while still under construction.

In May 1941 ORP Piorun located the German battleship Bismarck, and drew her fire, while other units of the Royal Navy task force caught up to sink the Bismarck.

After World War II, Piorun was returned to the Royal Navy and recommissioned as HMS Noble before being scrapped in 1955.

== Design ==
The eight ships of the N-class were ordered on 15 April 1939. They were a repeat of the J- and K-class destroyers, 16 of which were ordered in 1937.

The N-class were 339 feet 6 inches (103.48 m) long between perpendiculars and 356 feet 6 inches (108.66 m) overall, with a beam of 35 feet 8 inches (10.87 m) and a draught of 9 feet (2.7 m). Displacement was 1,773 long tons (1,801 t) standard and 2,384 long tons (2,422 t) full load. Two Admiralty three-drum boilers fed steam at 300 pounds per square inch (2,100 kPa) and 620 °F (327 °C) to two sets of Parsons single-reduction geared-steam turbines, rated at 40,000 shaft horsepower (30,000 kW). This gave a design speed of 36 knots (67 km/h; 41 mph) at trials displacement and 32 knots (59 km/h; 37 mph) at full load. 491 tons of oil were carried, giving a range of 5,500 nmi (6,300 mi; 10,200 km) at 15 kn (17 mph; 28 km/h) and 3,700 nmi (4,300 mi; 6,900 km) at 20 kn (23 mph; 37 km/h).

As designed, the N-class were to be armed with six 4.7 in (120 mm) QF Mark XII guns in three twin mountings, two forward and one aft. These guns could only elevate to an angle of 40 degrees, and so were of limited use in the anti-aircraft role. A short range anti-aircraft armament of a four-barrelled 2-pounder "pom-pom" anti-aircraft mount and eight .50 in machine guns in two quadruple mounts on the bridge wings was to be fitted, while torpedo armament was to be ten 21-inch (533 mm) torpedo tubes in two quintuple mounts. Early experience of the vulnerability of destroyers to air attack off Norway and during the evacuation from Dunkirk in 1940 resulted in the armament of the N-class being revised during construction. The aft set of torpedo-tubes was removed and replaced by a single 4 in (102 mm) QF Mark V anti-aircraft gun, while the quadruple .50 in machine guns on the bridge wings were replaced by two single Oerlikon 20 mm cannon, with two more Oerlikons abaft the searchlight, while two twin .50 inch machine guns were mounted on the ships' quarterdeck.

== History ==
The ship was built by John Brown & Company of Clydebank, Glasgow. She was laid down on 26 July 1939, launched on 7 May 1940. While initially ordered and launched under the name Nerissa, the ship was transferred to the Polish Navy in October 1940 and renamed Piorun. She was completed on 4 November 1940.

Piorun was based in Great Britain and commanded by Commander Eugeniusz Pławski. Between 13 and 15 March 1941, while undergoing repairs in John Brown's shipyard, she took part in the defence of Clydebank in the Clydebank Blitz against air raids by the Luftwaffe. A memorial to the ship's crew was later erected in Clydebank.

== Bismarck action ==
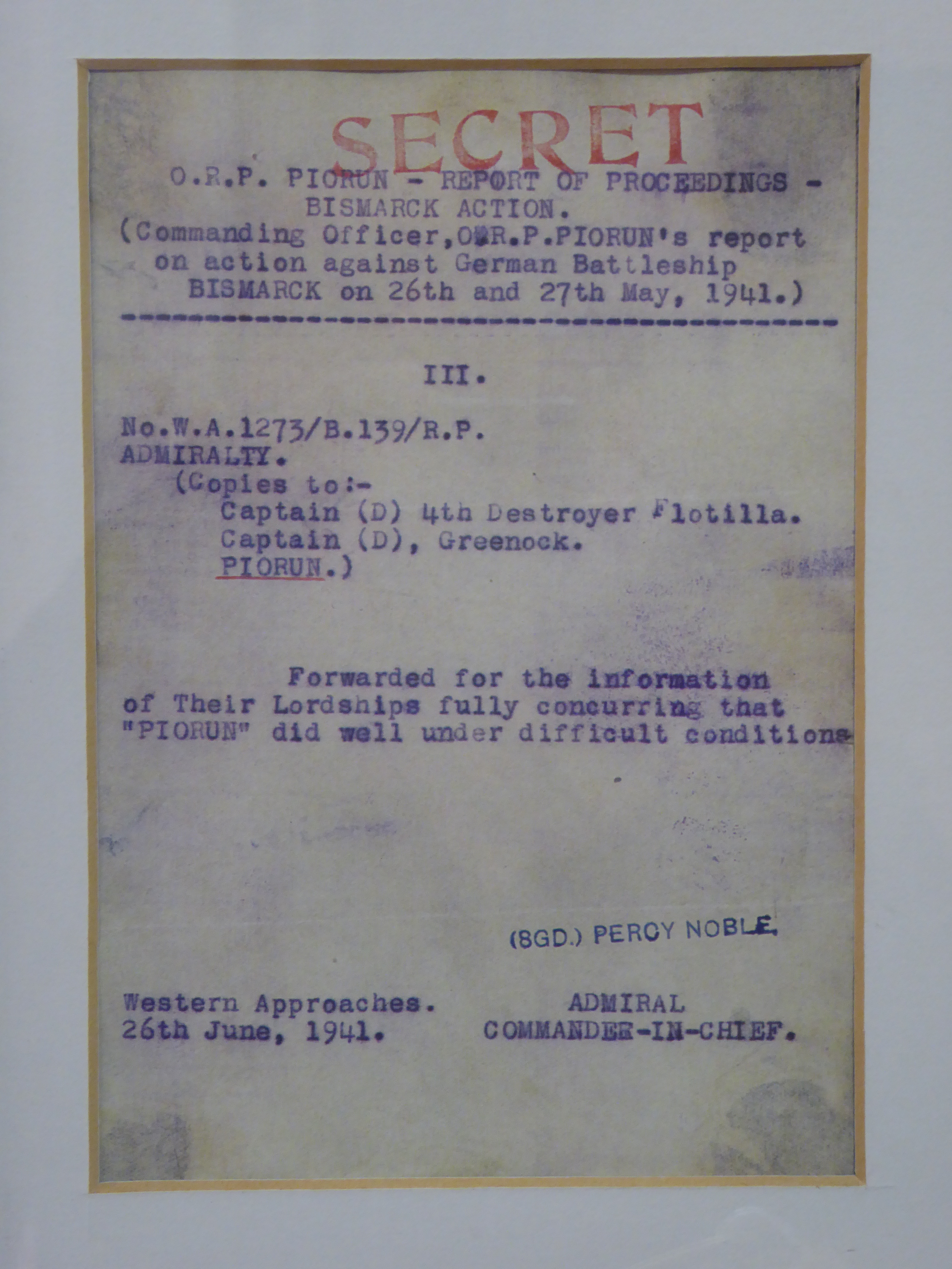
Contemporary secret report commending Piorun

On 22 May 1941, Piorun, with ships of the British 4th Destroyer Flotilla (HMS Cossack, HMS Maori, HMS Sikh and HMS Zulu), commanded by Captain Philip Vian, provided additional escort to troop convoy WS8B en route from Glasgow to the Indian Ocean. On 25 May, Vian's destroyers (including Piorun) were detached from the convoy to join the search for the German battleship Bismarck.

Piorun took part, along with the British destroyers, in the search for Bismarck (she was the first of the destroyers to spot the German ship). She joined in the shadowing of and torpedo attacks on the German battleship the night before Bismarck was sunk. Arriving first on the scene with the British Tribal-class destroyer Maori, Piorun charged at Bismarck by herself, while Maori manoeuvred into position to fire torpedoes. Alone, Piorun exchanged fire with Bismarck for an hour, with neither side scoring any hits—although after the third salvo, Bismarck missed by only 20 yards (18 m), causing Pławski to pull away.

According to one report (detailed at the Auschwitz I exhibition, Oświęcim, Poland), Pławski transmitted the message "I am a Pole" before commencing fire on Bismarck; other sources say the signal to commence fire was "Trzy salwy na cześć Polski" ("Three salvoes in honour of Poland"). This manoeuvre and the subsequent withdrawal caused Piorun to lose contact with Bismarck.

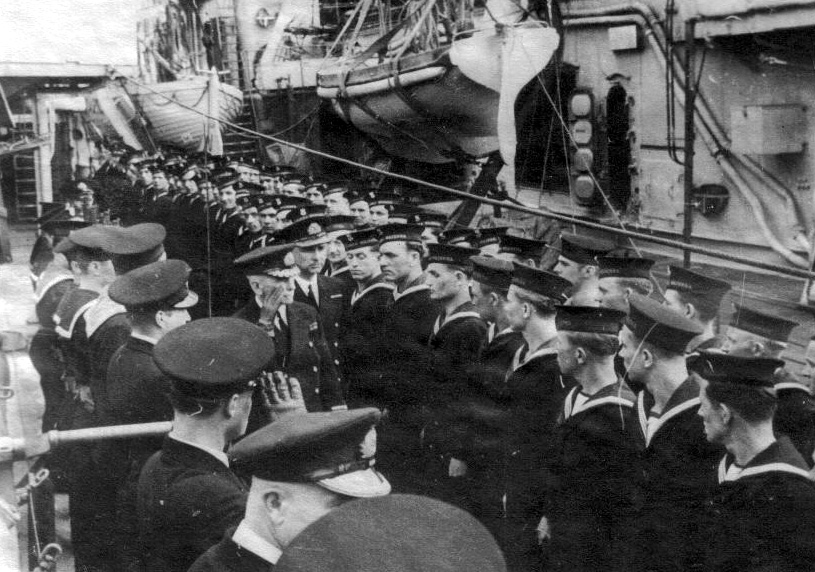
Piorun returns to Plymouth after Bismarck has been sunk

Another often repeated story, possibly an embellishment, mentions that the Piorun constantly signaled "I am a Pole" using her signal lights for the entirety of the engagement. It does remain possible, perhaps even likely, due to the fact that the signalman would be posted at the light during Battle Stations.

Piorun was very low on fuel, so at 05:00 she was ordered home before she had used her torpedoes. Pławski was reluctant to leave the area and ignored Vian's order for an hour before returning to the United Kingdom.

== Subsequent activity ==
Piorun subsequently operated in the Mediterranean, taking part in Operation Halberd, one of the Malta convoys and Operation Husky, the invasion of Sicily. In 1944 she was transferred to the Home Fleet. On 8 June 1944, the Piorun took part in the Battle of Ushant against Kriegsmarine destroyers.

Piorun took part in Operation Deadlight, and took part in the sinking of the captured German Type XXIII submarines U-2329, U-2334, U-2335, U-2337, U-2350 and U-2363.

She was returned to the Royal Navy in 1946 as HMS Noble and scrapped in 1955.
