= Poland's Wedding to the Sea =

1920 and 1945 ceremonies

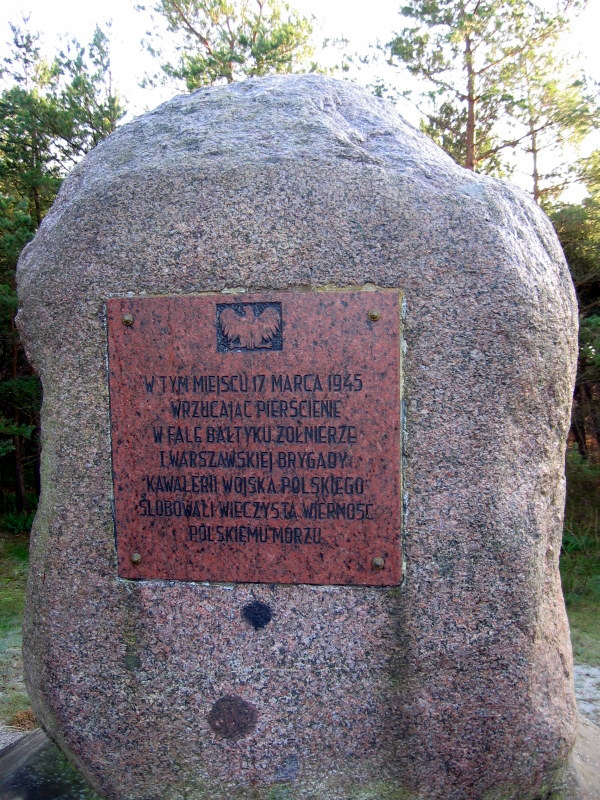
Memorial to the 1945 Wedding in Mrzeżyno

Poland's Wedding to the Sea was a ceremony meant t‌o symbolize restored Polish access to the Baltic Sea that was lost in 1793 by the Partitions of Poland. It was first performed on 10 February 1920 by General Józef Haller at Puck. In the early spring of 1945, following the Polish-Soviet advance into Pomerania, a number of such ceremonies took place in several locations. The most famous 1945 Weddings to the Sea were performed by the soldiers of the Polish Army on 17 March 1945 in Mrzeżyno (Deep), and on 18 March in the newly-captured port of Kołobrzeg (Kolberg).

== 1920 Wedding to the Sea ==
As Venice so symbolized its marriage with the Adriatic so we Poles symbolize our marriage with our dear Baltic Sea.

— General Haller at the 1920 ceremony in Putzig/Puck, The New York Times

In October 1919, General Jozef Haller was named commandant of the Pomeranian Front of the Polish Army, a unit created to peacefully recover former German Empire's province of Pomerelia, which was granted to the Second Polish Republic by the Versailles Treaty. On 18 January 1920, units of the 16th Infantry Division entered Toruń (Thorn), and in the following days, Polish soldiers moved northwards, finally reaching the Baltic Sea coast on 10 February. Their progress was slow but steady, with a few incidents of sabotage, carried out by the retreating Germans.

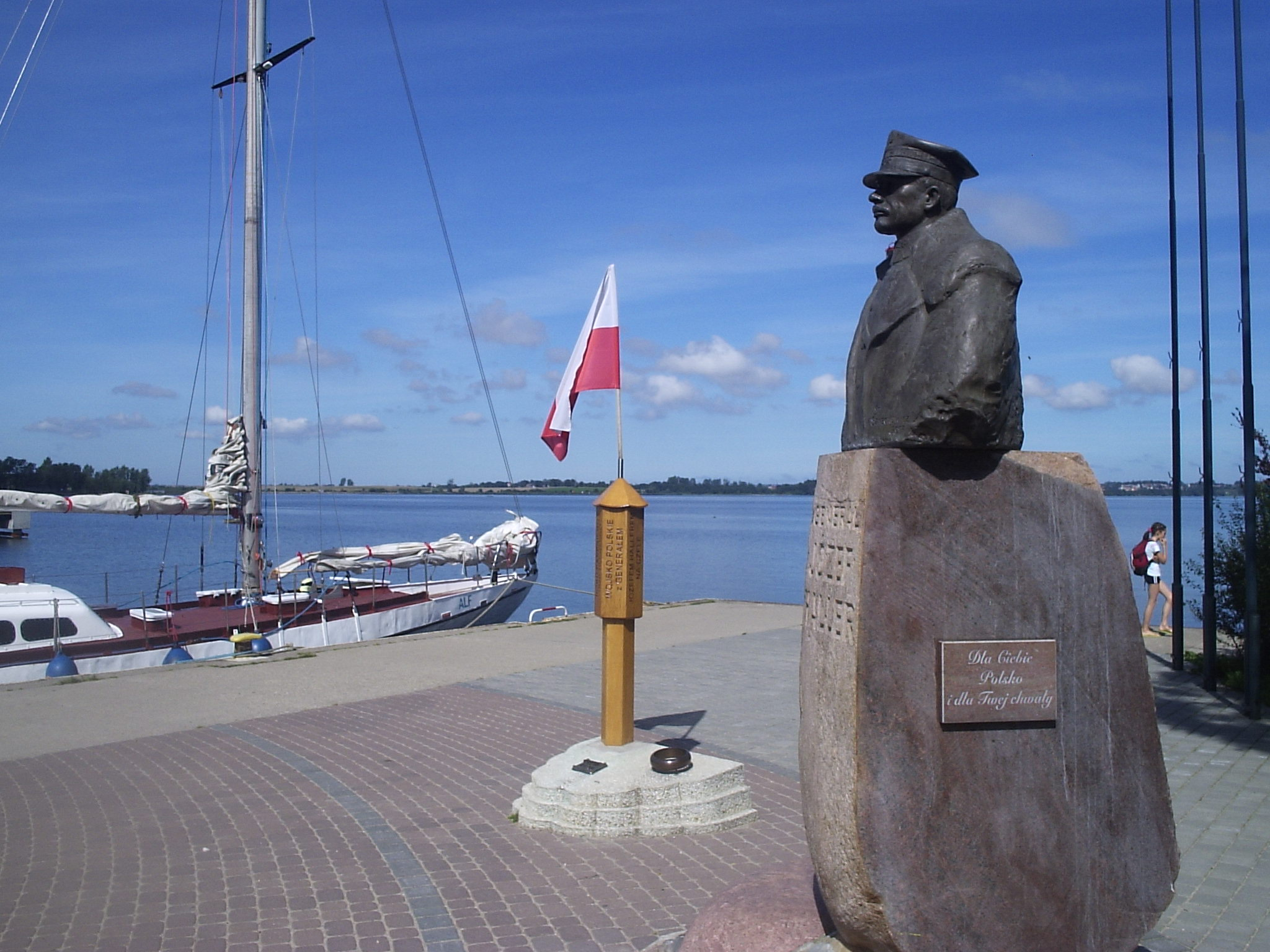
Site of the 1920 Wedding in Puck – Kashubia

Early in the morning of 10 February, General Haller and his staff, on the way from Toruń to Puck, met at Danzig Hbf. rail station with members of Polish community of the Free City of Danzig. Haller, fearing a German provocation, stayed in the train, which was entered by Dr. Józef Wybicki, grandson of Józef Wybicki, who handed to him two platinum rings, funded by Polish families of Danzig. One of the rings was later thrown into the sea in Puck.

After the meeting, the train with Haller and other Polish officials headed for Puck, where it was welcomed by crowds of Kashubians. At the Puck Rail Station the General mounted a horse, heading towards the sea with a unit of uhlans. The symbolic event was witnessed, among others, by Wincenty Witos, Stanisław Wojciechowski, Maciej Rataj, Pomeranian Voivode Stefan Laszewski, Polish envoy to Free City of Danzig Maciej Biesiadecki, General Kazimierz Sosnkowski, Dr. Józef Wybicki, and the "King of the Kashubians, Antoni Abraham". Main point of the ceremony was marked by a Roman Catholic service, with a sermon told by Reverend Jozef Wrycza. Flag of the Polish Navy was blessed, and then, to the salvo of 21 guns, it was raised on a mast by sailors Eugeniusz Pławski and Florian Napierala. This symbolically meant that from then on, Polish seacoast was guarded by the Navy.

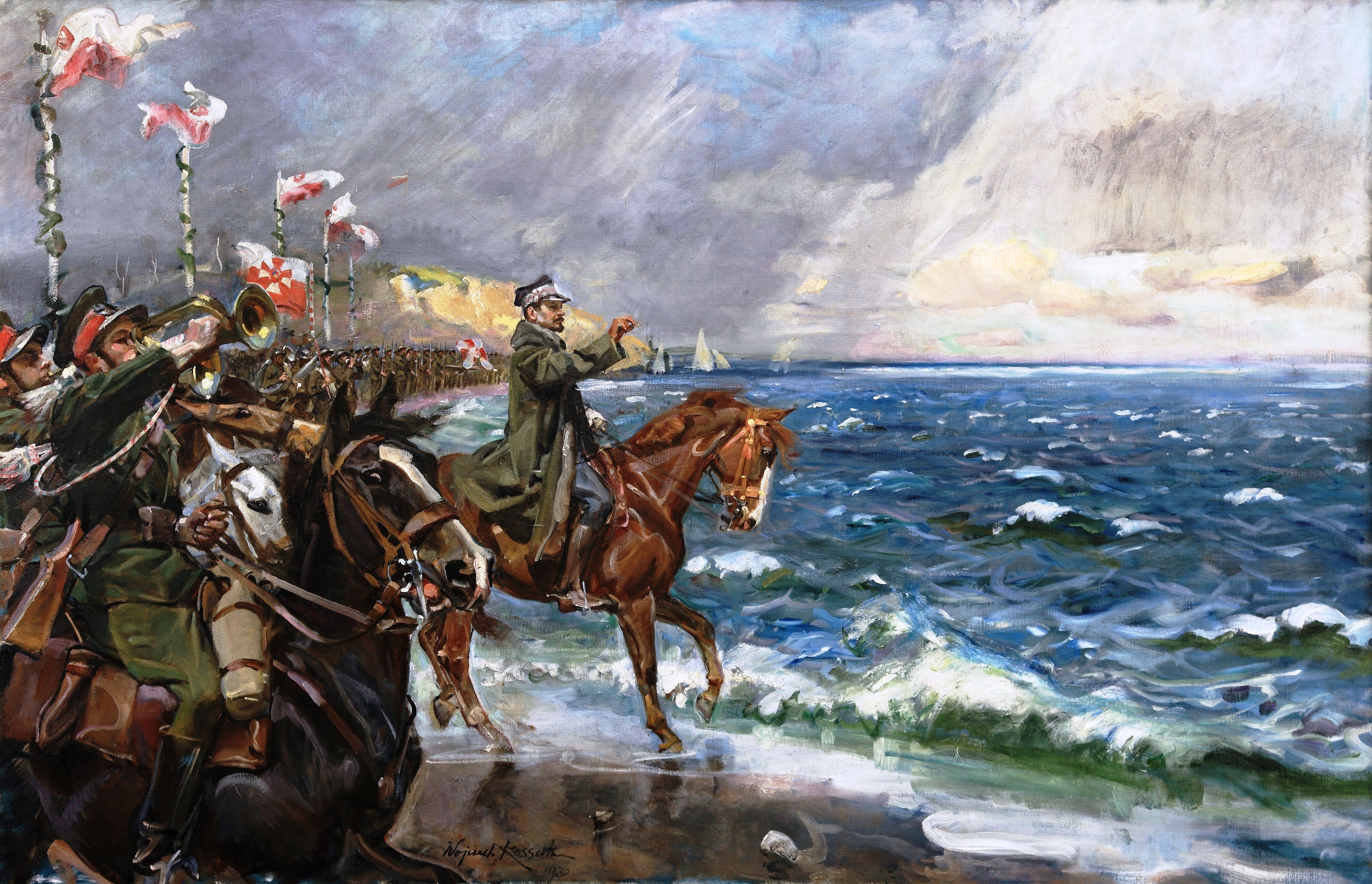
Poland's Wedding to the Sea by Wojciech Kossak. Painting of the 1920 ceremony in Puck

General Haller in his memoirs (published in 1964 in London) wrote that on that day, the Bay of Puck was frozen, so local fishermen cut an ice hole, into which Haller threw the ring. Before it fell into the water, the ring rolled on the ice: "Several fishermen ran after the ring, but none of them managed to catch it, and it fell into the icy water. When I asked why they did not catch it, the fishermen prophetically answered they would catch it in Szczecin". After throwing the ring into the water, Haller said the following words: "In the name of the Holy Republic of Poland, I, General Jozef Haller, am taking control of this ancient Slavic Baltic Sea shore". Wojciech Kossak, inspired by these events, painted in 1931 "Polish Wedding to the Sea".

The 1920 wedding to the sea took place north of the Port of Puck, in the area which belonged to the Naval Airforce. A commemorative post was later erected there, with a Polish eagle and the date. The post was destroyed during the 1939 German Invasion of Poland. Its replica now stands in the Port of Puck, next to the bust of General Haller.

On 11 February 1920, a day after the symbolic wedding, Kashubian fishermen invited Haller to Wielka Wieś (now Władysławowo), to carry out another ceremony, this time in the open waters of Baltic Sea. Haller accepted the invitation, and entered a cutter "Gwiazda Morza" ("Star of the Sea"). This made the General a very popular person among the locals. Haller himself purchased a plot of land near Wielka Wieś, founding a district called Hallerowo. The town of Władysławowo was created after a merger of Wielka Wieś and Hallerowo.

== 1945 Weddings to the Sea ==
In the early spring of 1945, a number of symbolic Weddings to the Sea took place along the Baltic Sea coast. The most well-known such ceremonies were on 17 March 1945 at the town of Mrzeżyno (Regamünde), and on 18 March at Kołobrzeg (Kolberg). This is what Polish historian Hieronim Kroczynski wrote in his book "Polskie tradycje morskie 967-1945" ("Polish Naval Traditions 967 - 1945"):

"In early 1945, the First Polish Army, formed in the Soviet Union, and subordinated to the Soviet 1st Belorussian Front, reached Pomerania, the ancient land of the Piasts, which was to become Polish again. During the Pomeranian Operation, as our units approached the sea, Polish soldiers remembered the historic 1920 Wedding to the Sea. The 1945 ceremony took place in war situation, as until the end of the war, the 10-kilometer wide strip of coast was officially regarded as frontline. The headquarters of the First Army decided that its units were to organize their own weddings. These ceremonies took place from 15 March to 6 April, along the Baltic Sea coast from Dziwnow (Berg Dievenow) to Gdynia (Gdingen). In the spirit of the 1920 tradition, rings were thrown into the water, and oaths of allegiance to the sea were sworn by the participants. Furthermore, in several cases flags of military units were dipped in water. On 17 March 1945 the First Warsaw Cavalry Brigade had its own ceremony at Mrzeżyno, and on 18 March the main ceremony of both First and Second Army took place at Kołobrzeg".

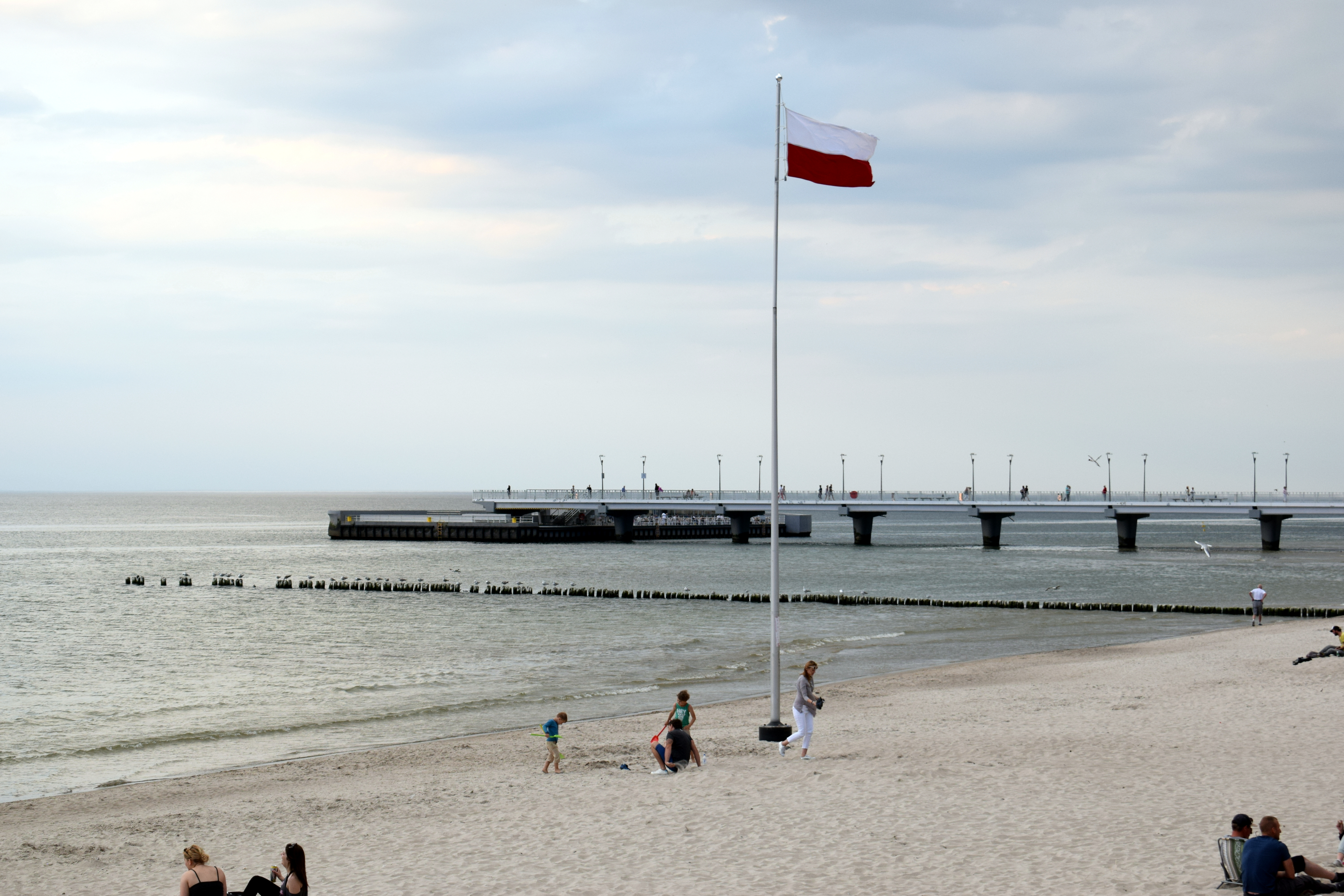
The flag marks the site of the 1945 Wedding in Kołobrzeg

Polish historian Hieronim Kroczynski from Kolobrzeg, who has been investigating Polish weddings to the sea says that the first ceremony of this kind in 1945 took place on 8 March, near the village of Grzybow, west of Kolobrzeg. On that day, a patrol of the 16th Infantry Regiment reached the shore. Colonel Wladyslaw Jurak, who had been a schoolteacher before the war, told the soldiers about the 1920 wedding, and the group spontaneously decided to repeat the ceremony.

News of this event reached headquarters of the 6th Infantry Division, to which the 16th Infantry Regiment belonged. Soon, General Michal Rola-Zymierski found out about it, and on 10 March 1945 text of the oath taken during weddings to the sea was printed by a Polish Army newspaper "Zwyciezymy": "I swear to you, Polish Sea, that I, a soldier of the Homeland, faithful son of the Polish nation, will not abandon you. I swear to you that I will always follow this road, the road which has been paved by the State National Council, the road which has led me to the sea. I will guard you, I will not hesitate to shed my blood for the Fatherland, neither will I hesitate to give my life so that you do not return to Germany. You will remain Polish forever".

Soon afterwards, a number of weddings took place:

- 12 March at Mrzezyno
- 15 March at Dziwnowek, by soldiers of the 2nd Warsaw Infantry Division, in which Wojciech Jaruzelski served
- 17 March again at Mrzezyno, by soldiers of the 1st Warsaw Cavalry Brigade
- 17, 18, 19 and 20 March at Kolobrzeg, by soldiers of various units, and at different locations within the city
- 6 April at Gdynia

=== Mrzeżyno (Regamünde) ===
On 17 March 1945 two fully-armed regiments of uhlans of the First Warsaw Cavalry Brigade stood ready at the main market square at Gryfice (Greifenberg). Following the order of their commandant, Major Stanislaw Arkuszewski, the soldiers headed towards Mrzeżyno, via Trzebiatow (Treptow an der Rega). After reaching the coastline, corporal Sochaczewski and uhlan Kobylinski rode their horses into the water, throwing two rings, which they had received from Major Arkuszewski. At the same time, uhlans of the 2nd and 3rd Regiments said the following words: "We swear eternal allegiance to the sea". Some sources claim that the oath was taken only by Major Arkuszewski.

The tradition of the 1945 wedding is still alive in Mrzeżyno. Every year, patriotic events take place on 17 March, and the ceremony is repeated by mounted reenactors, with rings thrown into the sea.

=== Kołobrzeg (Kolberg) ===
The first Soviet units arrived at the western suburbs of Kołobrzeg (Kolberg) on 4 March 1945. The Battle of Kołobrzeg began on the same day. By 17 March the Germans were pushed back to the beach and the sea, and on the night of 17–18 March the defenders of the city decided to abandon their lines, and evacuate most units to Swinemünde. The ceremony took place on 18 March in the evening. Polish historian Pawel Pawlowski, manager of the Museum of Polish Weapons at Kołobrzeg says that the town was chosen for the main 1945 Wedding to the Sea due to its symbolic importance, as the Germans turned it into a fortress (Festung Kolberg). Furthermore, Nazi propaganda turned the 1807 Siege of Kolberg into a myth, making an expensive film about it.

The decision about the main Kołobrzeg ceremony was taken on 18 March in the morning, after the hostilities had ended. On the same day in the evening, soldiers of the 7th Infantry Regiment of the First Polish Army were to take part in the wedding, which was organized by Colonel Piotr Jaroszewicz, who later became the Prime Minister of Poland. The ceremony began at 4 p.m. Central European Time, or at 6 p.m. Moscow Time, which was used by Soviet forces and Communist Polish troops. At this hour, some 200-300 soldiers of the 7th Regiment stood by the ruins of a fort near the entrance to the Port of Kołobrzeg. Specially constructed stand was filled with political officers, while the nearby lighthouse was in ruins, blown up by German engineers. The evening was cloudy, and soon it became to get dark. The ceremony began with a Roman Catholic service, followed by the raising of the Polish national flag, followed by a speech by Major Stanislaw Russijan, commandant of the 7th Regiment. The orchestra played the Polish anthem, and another speech was given by Jaroszewicz, who said, among other things:

Remember this day, as it is history. Future generations will talk about this event with respect, like we talk about our great ancestors. You are creating history, like once it was created by Bolesław Chrobry and Wladyslaw Krzywousty. You have gone the right way, from the Oka river to the Baltic, you have not chosen the wrong way, through the sands of Iran, and the swamps of Italy. That is why you have captured Kołobrzeg.

The ring was thrown into the sea by Corporal Franciszek Niewidziajlo, who himself was born in Kresy, near Zbaraz. Niewidziajlo also gave a speech, saying: "We have come here, to the Sea, after a hard and bloody effort. We see that our effort has not been wasted. We swear that we will never leave you. By throwing this ring into your waves, I am marrying you, because you have always been and always be ours".

== See also ==
- Landlocked country

== Sources ==
- "1920: Poland's Wedding to the Sea"—Article from Wrota Pomorza webpage, by Slawomir Lewandowski, 2007
- March 2013 reenactment of the Mrzezyno Wedding to the Sea
- Zdobycie Kolobrzegu
- 1,84867,6403288,Z_Archiwum_Sz__Zaslubiny_z_morzem.html
