= ORP Kujawiak (1921) =

Polish torpedo boat

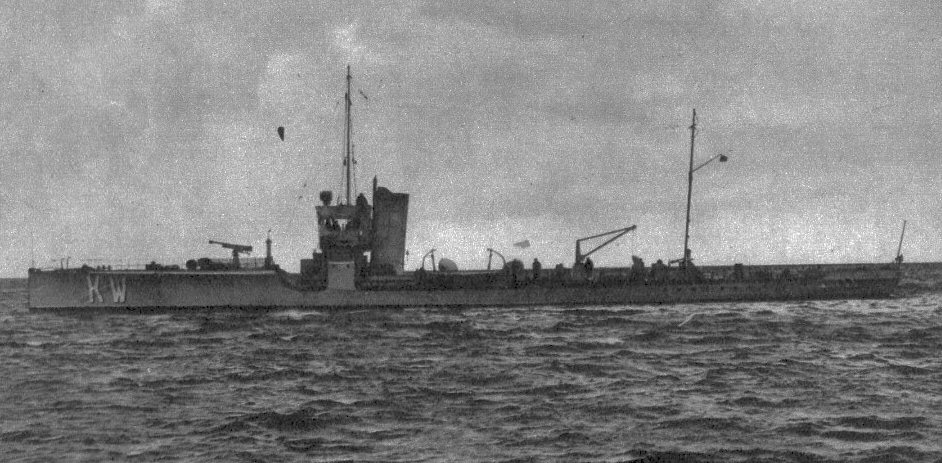

History

German Empire
- Name: A 68
- Builder: Schichau-Werke
- Launched: 11 April 1917
- Commissioned: 13 June 1917

Second Polish Republic
- Name: ORP Kujawiak
- Acquired: 17 September 1921
- Decommissioned: 6 April 1939
- Fate: Sunk in 1939, scrapped

General characteristics
- Class & type: torpedo boat
- Displacement: standard: 335 t (739,000 lb); full: 392 t (864,000 lb)
- Length: 60 m (196 ft 10 in)
- Draft: 6.4 m (21 ft 0 in)
- Propulsion: 2 Schichau-type turbines with a total power of 6,000 hp (4,500 kW), 2 Marine Kessel-type boilers with a pressure of 18.5 kgf/cm2, 2 three-bladed propellers with a diameter of 1.6 m
- Speed: 26.5 kn (49.1 km/h; 30.5 mph)
- Range: 800 nmi (1,500 km; 920 mi)
- Complement: (from 1937, 40 people) 62 people: 2 officers, 60 non-commissioned officers and sailors
- Armament: (1939) 1 French 75 mm field gun; 2 MG 08 of 7.92 mm caliber

ORP Kujawiak was a Polish A 56 type torpedo boat, served from 1921 to 1939; formerly the German A 68 from World War I, one of the first ships of the Polish Navy. The vessel was acquired by the navy from the division of Imperial German Navy ships after the end of the war. Struggling with technical issues, the unit served as a training ship from 1929, and then as an auxiliary ship, and was removed from the fleet list shortly before the outbreak of the war. During the Invasion of Poland, it served as a floating reserve oil tank, was sunk by aircraft, and subsequently scrapped.

== Construction, service, and acquisition by the Polish Navy ==
The ship belonged to a series of twelve torpedo boats (A 68 – A 79) ordered by the Imperial German Navy from the Schichau-Werke shipyard in Elbląg, belonging to the A 56 type. The torpedo boat, with the construction number 994, was launched on 11 April 1917. It was commissioned into service as A 68 on 13 June 1917. Due to its small displacement and draft, this type of ship was intended for operations in the coastal waters of Flanders. For quick identification, two stripes were painted on the funnel, and the white number 68 was painted on the bow. The torpedo boat served as a training ship. After the end of hostilities, based on the agreement reached on 18 November 1918 between the Triple Entente and Germany, the ship was transferred to the United Kingdom.

After the end of World War I, the German fleet was divided by the victorious powers. By the decision of the Conference of Ambassadors on 9 December 1919, despite the reluctance of the United Kingdom, Poland was allocated six torpedo boats, whose total displacement was not to exceed 1,200 t. The allocated torpedo boats were to be used exclusively for patrol service. In November 1920, the Polish Navy Command began preparations to take over the ships. Rear Admiral Wacław Kłoczkowski went to Rosyth and, on 6 November, along with the Brazilian attaché, inspected the torpedo boats there, which were then to be allocated to both navies by drawing lots. In November 1920, at the request of Rear Admiral Kłoczkowski, the Admiralty appointed a commission consisting of specialist engineers from the shipyard in Rosyth. Their task was to select the six most valuable torpedo boats to be transferred to the Polish Navy. One of the ships was A 68. The torpedo boat was moored at the Royal Navy base in Rosyth along with other ships and was in poor technical condition, making it impossible to tow it to Poland.

== Description ==
The overall length of ORP Kujawiak was 60 m, the width was 6.42 m, and the draft was 2.34 m. The ship was intended for coastal operations, hence its standard displacement was 335 t, and its full displacement was 392 t. Two Schichau steam turbines with a total power of 6,000 hp were placed in two compartments. The turbines worked directly on two three-bladed propellers with a diameter of 1.6 m, without any transmission. In the next two compartments, there were two Marine Kessel-type boilers with a pressure of 18.5 kgf/cm^{2}. Both boilers were oil-fired, with a maximum oil reserve of 82 t. Upon entering service, the maximum speed of the ship was 26 knots. After joining the Polish Navy, the ship could reach a speed of 22 knots. The sailing range at a speed of 20 knots was 800 nautical miles. In German service, the crew of the ship numbered 55 people, including 2 officers and 53 non-commissioned officers and sailors. In Poland, the standard crew for A-type torpedo boats was 2 officers and 66 non-commissioned officers and sailors. In 1937, the crew of the torpedo boat numbered 40 people. The quick identification marks of ORP Kujawiak were two stripes on the upper part of the funnel and, additionally, from 1932 to 1937, the letters KW on the sides.

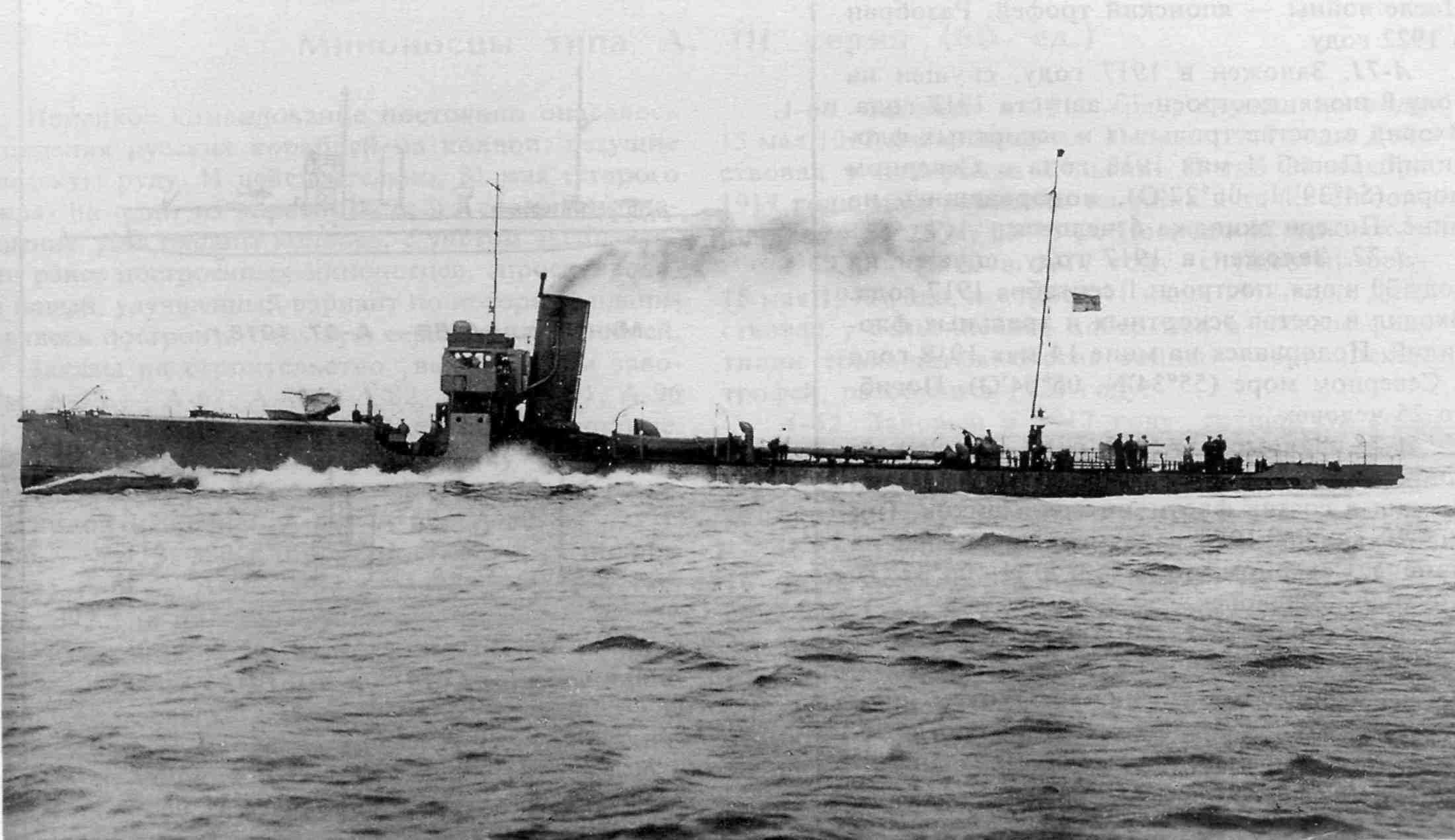
A 68 on the Baltic Sea

After joining the Imperial German Navy, the torpedo boat was armed with two single 88 mm L/30 guns and two single 450 mm torpedo tubes. Additionally, there were mine rails on the deck for 30 mines. After the ship was acquired by Poland, it was armed with two QF 3-pounder Hotchkiss and two MG 08 of 7.92 mm caliber. Thanks to a French loan obtained in 1925, ORP Kujawiak was rearmed with two single French 75 mm field gun. One was placed on the stern, and the other on the bow. The armament also included one double 450 mm torpedo launcher and two MG 08 of 7.92 mm caliber for anti-aircraft defense. The ship was also adapted to lay 30 mines. In 1936, the ship's armament consisted of one French 75 mm field gun and two single MG 08. In 1937, a special crane for lifting torpedoes was installed amidships. After 1936, ORP Kujawiak was painted in irregular black and white spots with straight-edged borders.

== Overhaul ==
On 10 November 1920, the British Admiralty sent the Polish side a proposal for the overhaul of torpedo boats at the state shipyard in Rosyth. According to Commander Ignacy Musiałowski, the British offer was accepted primarily for political reasons. Ultimately, with the approval of the Polish Navy Command, the overhaul of the ships began on 12 December 1920. Earlier, on 20 November, the Minister of Military Affairs sent Rear Admiral Wacław Kłoczkowski an advance payment for the overhaul of the torpedo boats amounting to 38,800 pounds and 3 shillings. The supervision of the overhaul was conducted by the Torpedo Boat Overhaul Supervision Office headed by Commander Ferdynand Dyrna, who was professionally subordinate to Rear Admiral Kłoczkowski.

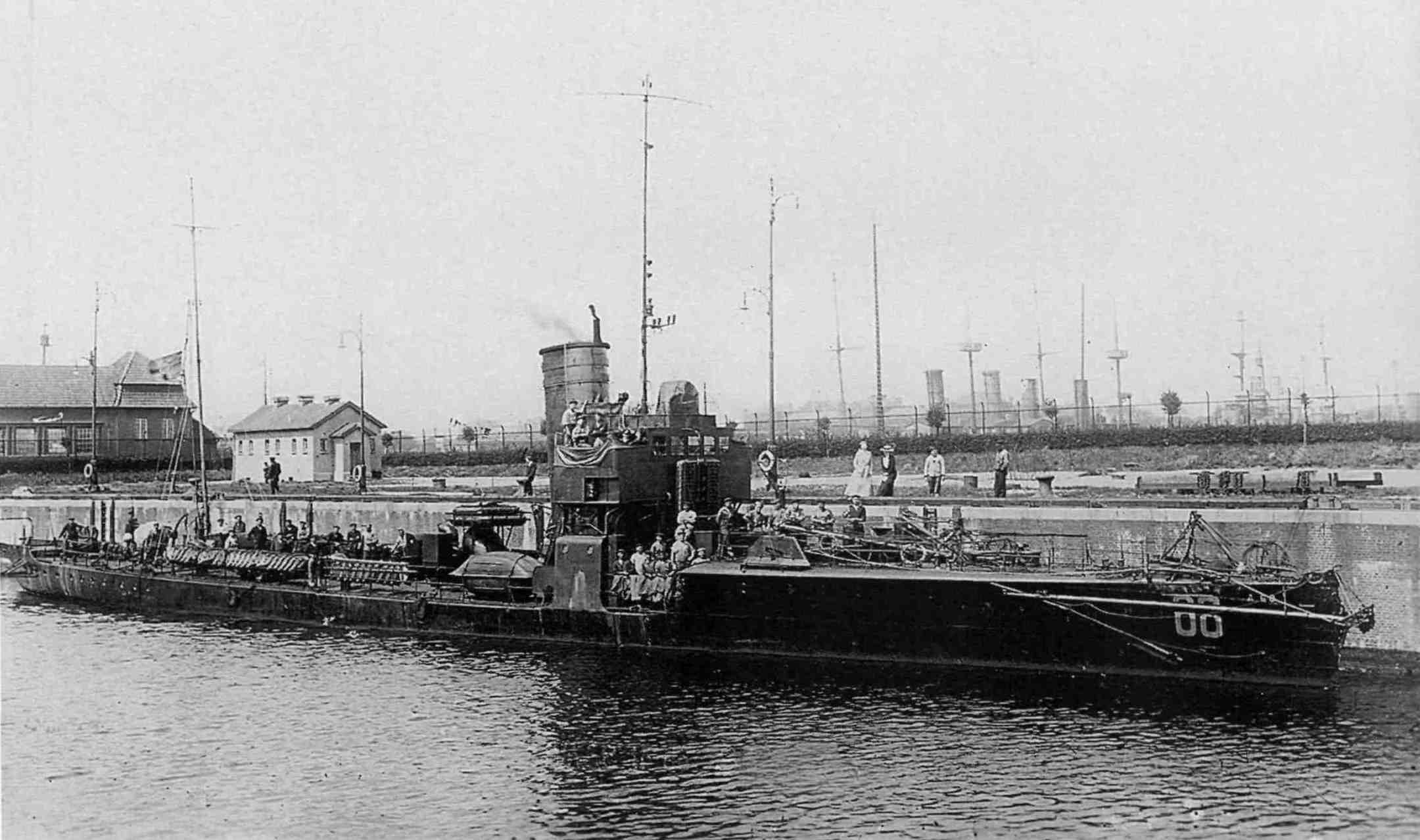
A 68 in port after the end of hostilities

Out of the six torpedo boats, four were selected and docked for overhaul, among them the future ORP Kujawiak. During the repair work, the underwater parts of the hull were cleaned and then painted. In mid-March, the shipyard workers conducted trials of auxiliary mechanisms using compressed air, as well as hydraulic tests of boilers, turbines, and condensers. The turbine bearings were also checked. At the end of March, Commander Ignacy Musiałowski, along with a representative of the Admiralty and the shipyard's foremen and managers, reviewed the progress of the work on the torpedo boats under repair. During the inspection, he noted several defects and omissions, including the lack of inspection of piping and its fittings, auxiliary boiler fittings, feed water and oil heaters, as well as flaps and valves.

After assessing the technical condition of the ship, the British set the date for the first sea trial for 16 April. However, it did not take place due to the Polish side's refusal to have the Polish crew participate in the sea trials. The second trial was scheduled for 30 May but was canceled due to a non-operational fuel feed pump. The first trial of auxiliary mechanisms was conducted on 7 June 1921 when steam was generated in the boilers. However, the trial lasted only 20 minutes and was interrupted due to boiler hatch leaks. Trials of the turbines in a moored state and the mechanisms were conducted on 14 June, during which no defects were found. On 28 June fans were delivered to the ship and installed three days later. On 22 July a five-hour sea trial was conducted, during which a maximum speed of between 17.5 and 18 knots was reached. Five days later, after minor repairs and sealing of steam and water glands, a six-hour sea trial was conducted, during which a maximum speed of 21.5 knots was achieved. Starting on 28 July, the bilges and boilers were cleaned, but according to the ORP Kujawiak's mechanic, Captain Stanisław Kamieński, the overhaul was performed unsatisfactorily. The ship was named ORP Kujawiak based on a secret order from the Minister of Military Affairs on 23 July 1921.

== Transfer to Poland ==
In September 1921, preparations began for the voyage to Poland. Earlier, on 25 August, Commander Michał Przysiecki arrived to take command of the torpedo boat. His deputy, Lieutenant Włodzimierz Kodrębski, had arrived the day before. Captain Engineer Stanisław Kamieński, who boarded on 16 August, was appointed the engineer-mechanic. The crew was assembled, consisting of 3 officers and 31 non-commissioned officers and sailors. Engineer Kamieński reported the readiness of the boilers, although noting that they and the fuel tanks were not completely cleaned. The auxiliary mechanisms and turbines were operational except for the bearings. A significant problem was the limited sea experience of the crew, particularly the engine room sailors, with only 20% having relevant experience; the rest had only theoretical training. On 16 September, the day before setting sail, a briefing was held for the commanders of the three ships, chaired by Rear Admiral Kłoczkowski. It was decided that the three torpedo boats would depart for the Norwegian port of Kristiansand on 17 September at midnight. Before departure, 57 tons of fuel oil were obtained from M.P. Galloway Ltd. in Leith, although the ship could hold 72 tons.

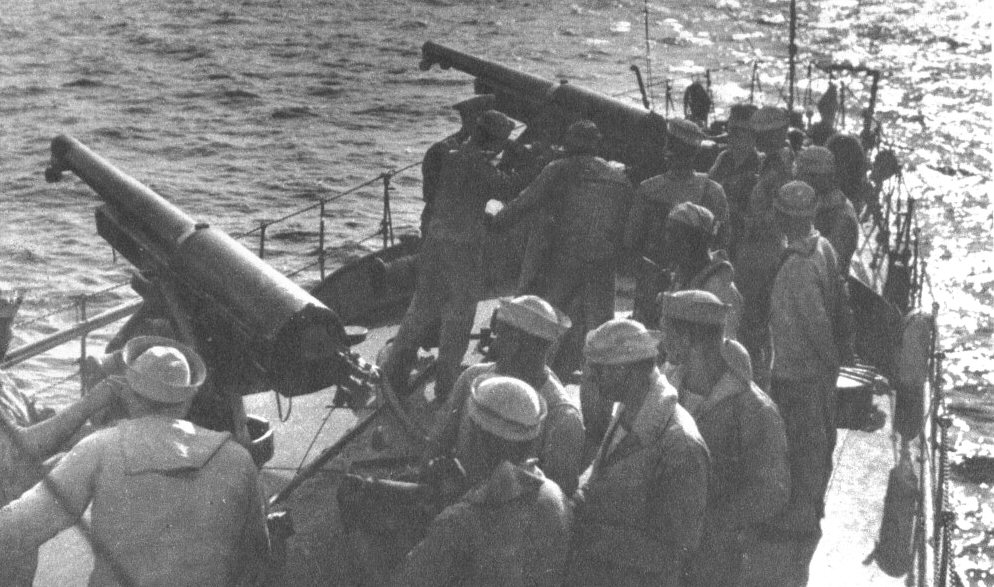
75 mm bow guns on ORP Mazur. Identical guns were mounted on ORP Kujawiak

On Saturday 17 September a ceremonial blessing of the three torpedo boats ORP Kujawiak, ORP Krakowiak, and ORP Kaszub took place in the roadstead of the port of Leith. Due to a late-issued order, the departure time was not met, and the ships set off at 03:15 AM. The torpedo boats sailed at variable speeds of between 8 and 14 knots. At 1:00 PM on ORP Kaszub, fuel ran out, and at 2:00 PM, on the division commander's order, refueling from ORP Kujawiak began. They transferred from 11 to 14 tons. Due to improper hose connections, some fuel spilled into the sea. Due to ORP Kaszub's difficulty maintaining speed, the division commander decided to turn back to Aberdeen. The crew managed to increase speed, and the ships headed east again. Soon, however, the torpedo boat lost speed again and returned to Scotland. The remaining ships proceeded at an economical speed of 15 knots. At 06:30 AM the next day, ORP Kujawiak ran out of fuel. Checking the tanks revealed a layer of sludge and dirt at the bottom. The ship's commander requested fuel or a tow from ORP Krakowiak. However, due to low fuel reserves and sea conditions, ORP Krakowiak continued onward. ORP Kujawiak anchored and called for assistance. The German fishing trawler Senator Brandt responded, towing the torpedo boat to Kristiansand on 21 September at 7:00 PM.

In the second stage of the journey from Kristiansand to Copenhagen, the ship, along with ORP Krakowiak, set off on 26 September, towed by the Norwegian tug Storesand. The division commander, Commander Jacynicz, decided on towing rather than sailing under their own power for economic reasons. The towing cost 8,000 Norwegian kroner, equivalent to 1,000 dollars. The ships reached Denmark on 28 September. After refueling with 20 tons of oil, all three torpedo boats departed for Gdańsk on 30 September at 5:00 PM. They were towed by vessels from the Danish company Union Transport-og Bjergnings-Selskab. ORP Kujawiak was towed by Neva. Shortly after departure, an accident occurred. Due to a towline break and poor maneuvering, ORP Kaszub's stern damaged ORP Kujawiak's bow, forcing the team to return to Copenhagen. The division set out to sea again on 1 October at 4:00 AM. The voyage was smooth, and around midnight near the Słupsk Bank, the ships cast off the towing lines and entered the Gdańsk Bay on their own. On the morning of 3 October ORP Kujawiak and ORP Krakowiak entered the port of Gdańsk.

== Service in Poland ==
The ship arrived in Poland on 3 October 1921. Like the other torpedo boats, it required further repairs and armament. On 15 October it was incorporated into the Torpedo Boat Division. Earlier, on 5 October, it had been placed in reserve. Acceptance trials for the torpedo boat took place on 8 November and 9 December 1921. It spent the winter in the port of Gdańsk along with other units of the division.

Ship commanders
Lieutenant Commander Michał Przysiecki	10 February 1921	September 1924
Lieutenant Commander Adam Mohuczy	October 1924	1925
Captain Jan Giedroyć	1925	1927
Captain Aleksander Hulewicz	1929	1929
Captain Władysław Kosianowski	1927	March 1928
Captain Stanisław Hryniewiecki	March 1928	14 June 1928
Lieutenant Henryk Kłoczkowski	15 June 1928	9 August 1928
Captain Jan Giedroyć	10 August 1928	31 August 1928
Captain Edward Szystowski	1 September 1928	21 November 1928
Lieutenant Jerzy Kossakowski	22 November 1928	1929 (p.o.)
Captain Mikołaj Szemiot	1929	26 May 1930
Captain Tadeusz Stoklasa	27 May 1930	24 February 1931
Captain Anatol Lewicki	25 February 1931	August 1932
Captain Mikołaj Szemiot	25 April 1932	1 December 1932
Captain Henryk Kłoczkowski	2 December 1932	13 January 1933
Captain Andrzej Łoś	14 January 1933	13 April 1933
?	14 April 1933	2 November 1933
Lieutenant Viktor Lomidze	3 November 1933	1934
Captain Brunon Jabłoński	May 1934	16 December 1934
Lieutenant Bolesław Porydzaj	17 December 1934	?
Lieutenant Józef Wierzchowski	April 1938	May 1938
Lieutenant Jerzy Koziołkowski	May 1938	11 July 1938
Captain Justyn Karpiński	12 July 1938	9 November 1938
Captain Jan Grudziński	10 November 1938	13 December 1938

The first commander of the ship was Lieutenant Commander Michał Przysiecki, appointed to this position on 10 February 1921. After being incorporated into the Polish Navy, the ship was armed with two QF 3-pounder Hotchkiss and two 7.92 mm machine guns. Using funds from a French loan obtained in 1924, new armaments were purchased and installed a year later, including two 75 mm naval guns, two 450 mm torpedo launchers, and mine rails. The primary mission of the torpedo boat was to train new personnel for the navy. To this end, it made voyages to Baltic ports. In 1922, it visited Copenhagen with other torpedo boats, and in 1923, Karlskrona and Kalmar. On 29 April 1923 ORP Kujawiak participated in the ceremonial opening of the Temporary War Port and Fishermen's Shelter in Gdynia. On its deck, as the first warship, the flag of the President of Poland, Stanisław Wojciechowski, was hoisted. He was accompanied at the ceremony by, among others, Prime Minister General Władysław Sikorski and the Primate of Poland, Cardinal Edmund Dalbor. In June, along with the ships of the Division, it made a courtesy visit to Liepāja and Riga. On 16 July 1923, the torpedo boat was taken out of service and used to organize the Gdynia observation point. The Economic Commission of the Training Division was accommodated on its deck. The ship was moored at the quay, where a barrack with a wooden tower serving as an observation point was set up. After a few months, ORP Kujawiak returned to service.

The Torpedo Boat Division ships participated in an unofficial visit to Copenhagen on 11 October 1929. By order of the Fleet Commander, ORP Kujawiak was detached from the Torpedo Boat Division and, from 1 February 1929, served as a training artillery ship until it was replaced by ORP Mazur. During this period, it was directly subordinated to the Fleet Commander. From 1 April 1930, it was a ship on which motor mechanics and mechanics were trained. On 2 June it was assigned to the Fleet Training Division, and on 27 July, after the embarkation of the officer responsible for training, it was reclassified as a machine training ship. The conversion of the ship into a tanker, torpedo retriever, and target ship was completed on 29 July 1932, and two days earlier, on 27 July 1932, it was incorporated into the Submarine Division, although administratively it remained in the Mine Division until 1 September 1932.

In June 1937, the hull of ORP Kujawiak was in such poor technical condition that water leaks were detected. To carry out the necessary repairs, including sealing the bottom, the ship was drydocked from 22 to 27 August. On 12 April 1938, it began active service, which lasted until 13 December 1938. On 1 June, in Basin No. 1, the tug Sokół struck the starboard side with its stern, causing significant damage to the plating. The next day, the ship was drydocked for repairs, which were completed on 8 July. On 13 December 1938, ORP Kujawiak was placed in reserve and converted into a floating fuel tank. By order of the Chief of the Naval Command on 13 March 1939, it was transferred to the second reserve. Finally, ORP Kujawiak was removed from the list of Polish Navy ships by order of the Minister of Military Affairs on 6 April 1939.

During the September Campaign, it served as a floating reserve fuel tank for the Mine Division, anchored in the Kuźnica Bay off the coast of Jurata. On 3 September it was towed to Oksywie, where it was sunk by German bombers. After the end of hostilities, it was probably salvaged by the Germans and scrapped.
