= Eugeniusz Pławski =

Polish naval officer (1895–1972)

- Born: 26 March 1895; Novorossiysk, Russian Empire
- Died: 23 May 1972 (aged 77); Vancouver, Canada
- Military career
- Allegiance: Russian Empire up to 1918, Poland
- Branch: Imperial Russian Navy; Polish Navy
- Service years: 1914–1948
- Rank: komandor captain
- Commands: Zorkiy; ORP Czajka; ORP Mewa; ORP Generał Haller; ORP Żbik; Ouragan; ORP Piorun; HMS Dragon submarine flotilla destroyer flotilla
- Conflicts: World War II
- Awards: Cross of Valour; Cross of Merit (Poland) (Golden Cross); Navy Medal; Order of the Dannebrog; Legion of Honour; Order of Vasa; Distinguished Service Cross (United Kingdom)

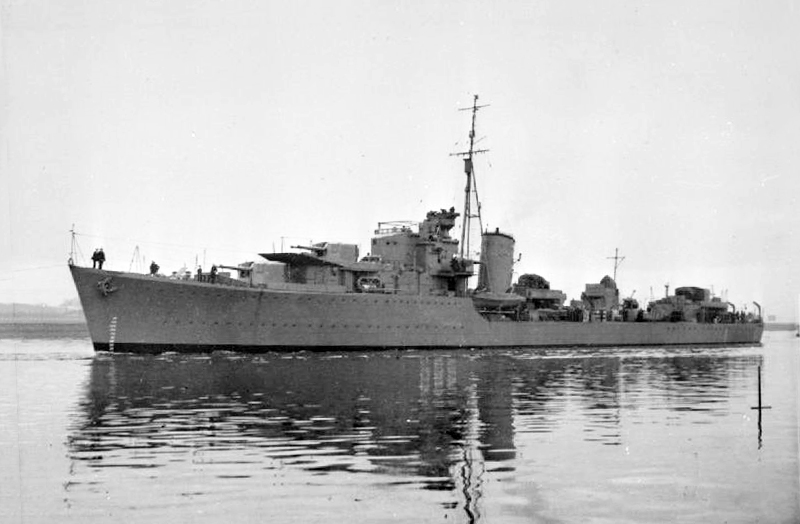
ORP Piorun

Eugeniusz Józef Stanisław Pławski (26 March 1895 – 23 May 1972) was a Polish Navy officer who served in World War I and World War II. He was the commander of the ORP Piorun during the hunt for Bismarck.

== Biography ==
=== Early years ===
Born in Novorossiysk he was the son of Aleksander Pławski, a brigadier general in the Imperial Russian Army. Eugeniusz was graduated from the Sea Cadet Corps in Khabarovsk and from the Sea Cadet Corps in Saint Petersburg, he also finished the Naval Aviation School in Sevastopol and the submarine navigation course in Toulon.

=== Great War ===
He began his career in 1914 as a midshipman in the Black Sea Fleet fighting the entire war against Bulgarians, Turks and Germans. He became a watch officer on the destroyer Derzky. From 1916 he was the aide-de-camp to the commander of the 2nd destroyer flotilla then he served in the torpedo brigade and in the anti-submarine defense. In 1917 he became the navigation officer on the destroyer Gnevny. After the outbreak of the revolution he assumed command of the destroyer Zorkiy.

=== Interwar period ===
After the rebirth of Poland he came to Warsaw and was accepted to the Polish Navy. He was an operations officer in the river port Modlin, then he served in the Marine battalion with which he participated in the liberation of Pomerania. During the Poland's Wedding to the Sea he gave the order to hoist the Flag of Poland. In 1920 he took command of the naval base in Puck. From 1924 he commanded the following ships: minesweepers ORP Czajka and ORP Mewa and the gunboat ORP General Haller. In 1927 he was appointed as the director of science in the Navy school of specialists. In the years 1928–1931 he led the Polish submarine navigation course in France. In 1931 he became commander of the submarine ORP Żbik. In the years 1932–1936 he took command of the submarine flotilla. In 1936 he was transferred to the Polish Navy Command. In 1939 he was sent on a mission to France seeking military assistance in case of Third Reich's invasion of Poland.

=== World War II ===
At the outbreak of war, he stayed in France and tried to form an aid convoy for Poland. Then he was sent to London. In 1940 he assumed command of the French destroyer Ouragan transferred to the Polish Navy. On 24 October 1940 he became commander of ORP Piorun on which he escorted convoys on the Atlantic and Mediterranean. During the hunt for the Bismarck, on 26 May 1941, he spotted and engaged the German battleship. From 1941 to 1943 he was a military attaché in Sweden. On 15 May 1943 he took command of the cruiser ORP Dragon. In 1944 he became chief of staff of the Polish Navy.

=== In exile ===
After the dissolution of the Polish Armed Forces in the West Pławski gave the banner and the flag of Polish Navy to the Polish Institute and Sikorski Museum in London. In 1946–1947 he commanded a transit camp in Okehampton. In 1948 he moved to Canada. From 1952 to 1972 he worked as a translator for the government of Canada.

Eugeniusz Pławski died on 22 May 1973 in Vancouver. He was buried in The Gardens of Gethsemani Cemetery. On 16 June 2004 his ashes were brought to Poland and buried in the Polish Navy cemetery in Gdynia.

== Awards and decorations ==
Cross of Valour
Golden Cross of Merit
Naval Medal
Order of the Dannebrog
Legion of Honour
Order of Vasa
Distinguished Service Cross

== Military promotions ==
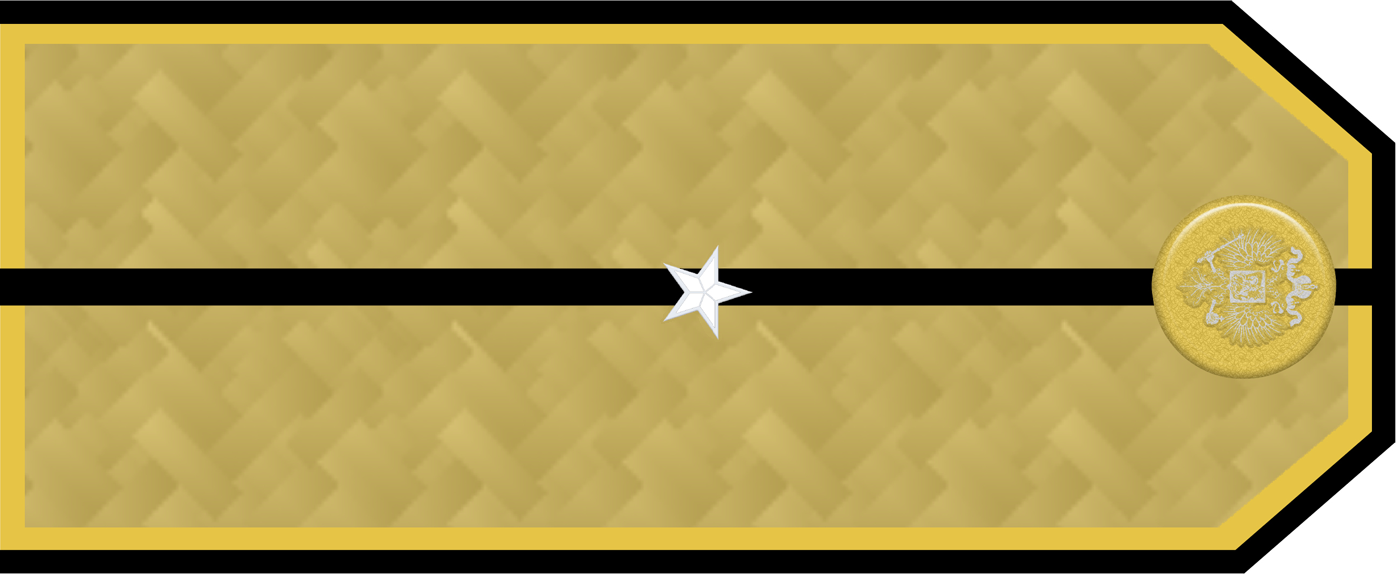
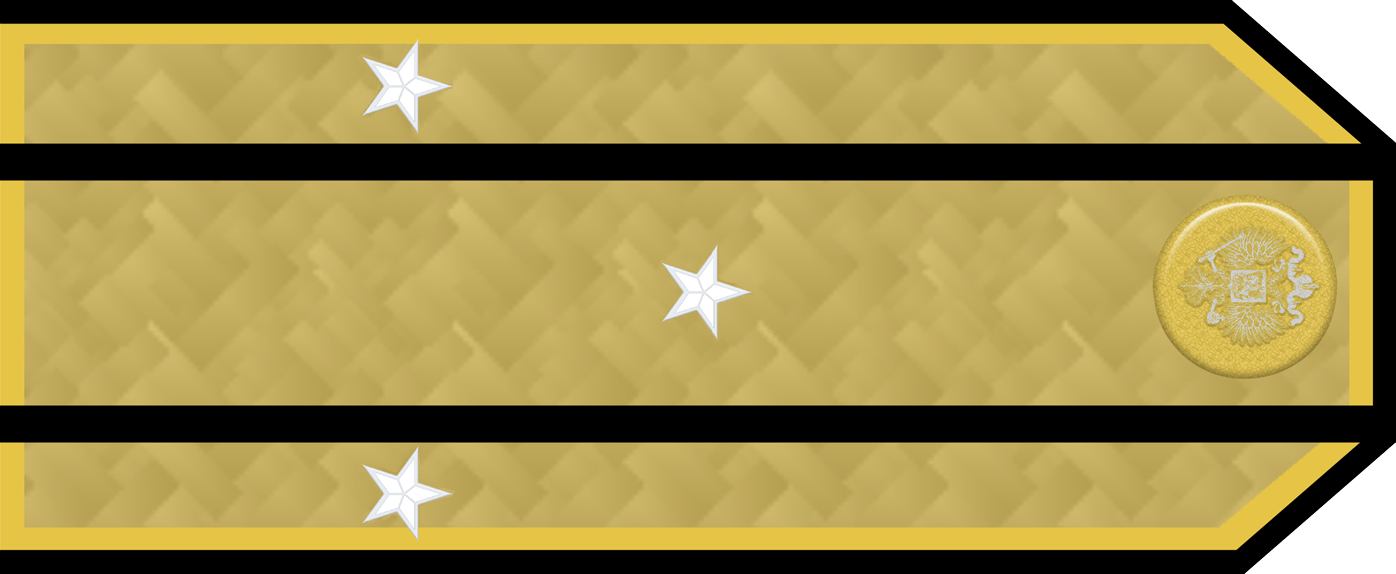
Мичман midshipman	1914 (Russian Empire)
Капитан-лейтенант sub-lieutenant	1917 (Russian Empire)
porucznik sub-lieutenant	1918 (Poland)
kapitan lieutenant	1921 (Poland)
komandor podporucznik lieutenant commander	1931 (Poland)
komandor porucznik commander	1935 (Poland)
komandor captain	1942 (Poland)
