= Bogusław Krawczyk =

Polish officer

- Born: 15 May 1906; Dubienka, Congress Poland (present day Poland)
- Died: 19 July 1941 (aged 35); Dundee, United Kingdom
- Military career
- Allegiance: Poland
- Branch: Polish Navy Poland
- Service years: 1928–1941
- Rank: Komandor podporucznik Commander
- Commands: ORP Wilk
- Conflicts: World War II
- Awards: Virtuti Militari (Silver Cross); Cross of Valour; Navy Medal (Medal Morski); Distinguished Service Order

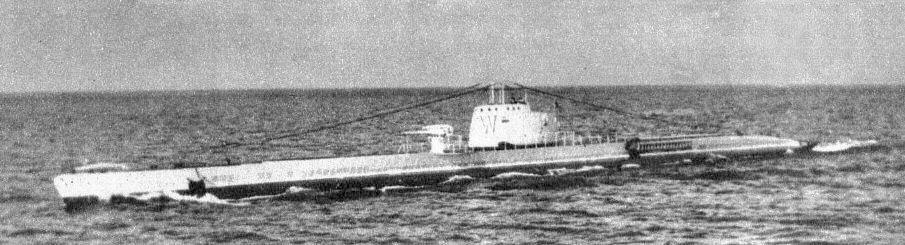
ORP Wilk

Bogusław Dionizy Krawczyk (15 May 1906 – 19 July 1941) was a submarine commander of the Polish Navy during World War II.

== Biography ==
He was the son Władysław and Michalina Witkowska. He graduated in 1925 in Hrubieszów, in the same year he entered the Polish Naval Academy where he graduated, valedictorian in 1928. He was sent to complete his education in France at the École d'Application des Enseignes de Vaisseau during which he took an instructional cruise on the French armored cruiser Edgar Quinet. In 1929 he came back to Poland and was assigned to the Pinsk Flotilla. In 1930 he served in the command of the Navy, in the years 1931–1932 he completed the submarine navigation course in Toulon and in 1934 the underwater weapons training. He served on the submarines ORP Wilk and ORP Żbik. In 1938 he took command of Wilk. He had a reputation as one of the best submarine officers in the Polish Navy with a high knowledge, culture and abilities to command. He spoke four languages fluently, played piano, painted, wrote poems and sailed.

During the Invasion of Poland, Wilk patrolled the Gdańsk Bay, and on 3 September deployed her mines as planned. The submarine was attacked several times, Krawczyk decided to join England and arrived at Rosyth on 20 September. After the reparations in Dundee, Wilk was assigned to the 2nd Submarine Flotilla patrolling on the North Sea. On 3 May 1940 he was promoted komandor podporucznik (commander) soon after he was sent on a secret mission to Sweden to negotiate the release from internment of three Polish submarines (ORP Ryś, ORP Żbik and ORP Sęp) interned in September 1939. However, due to the allied defeat in Norway, the collapse of the French front and increasing German pressure on Swedish government, the mission ended in failure. Krawczyk returned empty handed.

On 19 July 1941 Bogusław Krawczyk committed suicide, the reasons for which are not fully known.

== Awards and decorations ==
Virtuti Militari, Silver Cross
Cross of Valour
Navy Medal (Medal Morski)
Distinguished Service Order

== Military promotions ==
| sub-lieutenant (podporucznik) | 1928 |
| lieutenant (porucznik) | 1930 |
| lieutenant commander (kapitan) | 1936 |
| commander (komandor podporucznik) | 1940 |
