= Peta =

People for the Ethical Treatment of Animals, commonly known as PETA, is an American animal rights organization.

Peta or PETA may also refer to:

== Groups, organizations, companies ==
- Defenders of the Homeland (Indonesian: Pembela Tanah Air), volunteer armies established by the occupying Japanese in the Dutch East Indies and British Malaya during World War II
- People Eating Tasty Animals, an organization mocking the People for the Ethical Treatment of Animals' stance on veganism
- Philippine Educational Theater Association, a Philippine theatrical association

== People ==
- Peta (given name), including a list of people and fictional characters with the name
- Tomasz Peta (born 1951), Roman Catholic Archbishop of the Metropolitan Archdiocese of Saint Mary in Astana, Kazakhstan

== Places ==
- Peta, Greece, a town
- Peţa River, a river in Romania

== Other uses ==
- peta-, a metric prefix denoting a factor of 10^{15}
- Peta (cat), the unofficial Chief Mouser to the UK Cabinet Office 1964-78
- Pentaerythritol tetraacrylate (PETA), an organic chemical
- Pulse Ejector Thrust Augmentor, a type of jet engine

== See also ==
- Mysore peta, a type of Indian royal turban
- Petta (disambiguation)
- Pettah (disambiguation)
- Pita (disambiguation)
- Pet (disambiguation)
