= Petta =

Petta may refer to:

== People ==
- Bobby Petta, Dutch-Indonesian footballer
- Francesco Miano-Petta, retired amateur Italian freestyle wrestler
- Gustavo Petta, Brazilian politician
- Jason Petta, American physicist
- Julia Petta, Italian housewife known as The Italian Bride
- Nicholas Pettas, Greek-Danish karateka
- Nikos Pettas, Greek professional basketball player
- Paolo Petta, Italian computer and cognitive scientist
- Xavier Di Petta, an Australian computer programmer

== Other ==
- Petta (annelid), a genus of worms
- Petta (film), a 2019 Indian film
  - Petta (soundtrack), soundtrack for the film by Anirudh Ravichander

== See also ==
- Peta (disambiguation)
- Pettah (disambiguation)
- Pettai (disambiguation)
- Patti (disambiguation)
