= Schache =

Schache is a surname. Notable people with the surname include:

- Anja Schache (born 1977), German foil fencer
- Elisabeth Schache (1906-1999), German Catholic nun
- Josh Schache (born 1997), Australian rules footballer
- Lars Schache (born 1976), German foil fencer, husband of Anja
- Laurence Schache (1967–2002), Australian rules footballer
- Ruediger Schache (born 1963), German author
