= Winston Churchill's pets =

The National Trust maintains a marmalade cat with white bib and socks at Chartwell in memory of Churchill's last cat, Jock. This is Jock VII in 2023.

Winston Churchill was an animal lover and kept many pets. He had pet cats and dogs such as his bulldog Dodo, wartime cat Nelson, poodle Rufus and marmalade cat, Jock. He also kept a large variety of creatures on his estate, Chartwell, including butterflies, cows, fish, pigs and swans.

He was an equestrian for much of his life, from riding the pony Rob Roy at the age of seven, leading lancers in Britain's last cavalry charge at the Battle of Omdurman, to playing polo in his fifties and riding to hounds in his seventies. He then owned and bred prize-winning racehorses, starting with Colonist II in 1949.

== Cats ==
Churchill had many cats in his life, both at Chartwell and in government service. At Chartwell, these included a tabby, Mickey, and a "marmalade colored" cat named Tango. Tango was there in the 1930s and 1940s and appears in anecdotes about those years. But Churchill's most famous wartime cat was Nelson who was initially a mouser at the Admiralty when Churchill was First Lord. Churchill named him Nelson after the great admiral after seeing the cat chase a large dog away. He then took the cat with him to 10 Downing Street when he became prime minister, where it also chased Chamberlain's cat, the Munich Mouser.

In later life, he was given a cat by Jock Colville for his 88th birthday. This was a ginger cat with white markings that he called Jock too. This cat became a favourite in his final years. When he died and Chartwell was donated to the National Trust, the family asked that a marmalade cat with white bib and socks called Jock should always be maintained there. This tradition has continued and Jock VII became the current holder of this position in 2020.

== Dogs ==
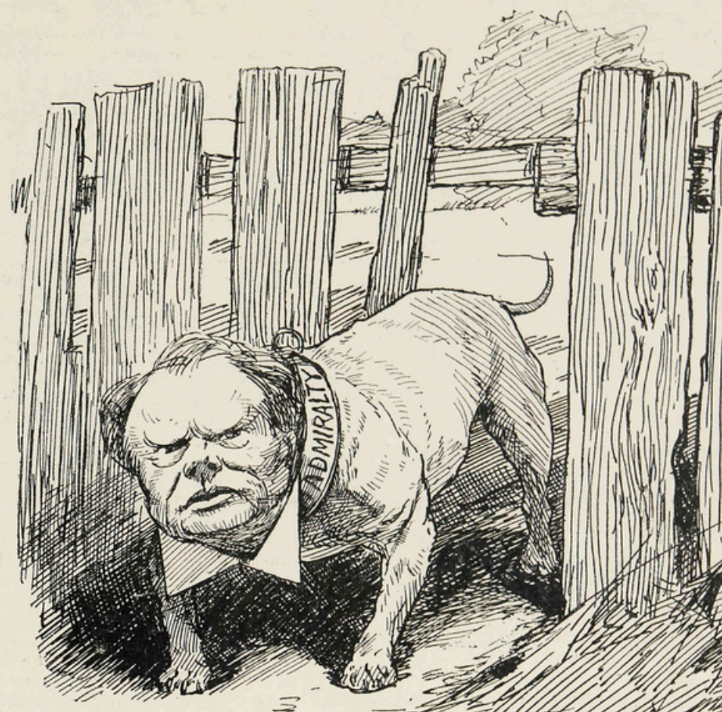
Churchill in the Punch cartoon, "Dogg'd" – an early example of such caricatures, when he was First Lord of the Admiralty

The graves of Rufus II, Rufus and Jock (L–R) at Chartwell

A popular image for Churchill was the British bulldog and his first dog was a bulldog called Dodo which he sold his bicycle to buy when he was a pupil at Harrow School. But, for most of his life, he supposed that dogs did not like him until, during the Second World War, he acquired a brown poodle called Rufus. Rufus was a close companion and accompanied Churchill on his wartime adventures such as sailing the Atlantic to meet the US President, Franklin Roosevelt. But Rufus was denied access to the Cabinet Room, "No, Rufus, I haven't found it necessary to ask you to join the wartime Cabinet."

When Rufus was killed by a motor car in 1947, Churchill was upset. But after a period of mourning, a similar poodle was found for him and this was also named Rufus. This Rufus was unhealthy but recovered and lived until 1962. Churchill took to him too and wrote, "No one should not know the companionship of a dog. There is nothing like it."

Both Rufus and Rufus II were buried at Chartwell, on the top terrace, side by side. The cat Jock is buried next to them.

== Fish ==
The main pond where Churchill would meditate and feed his golden orfe

The fish in 2023

Churchill kept goldfish in his ponds at Chartwell. In 1938, the round pond was stocked with a thousand golden orfe which he often fed personally with maggots, even when he was Prime Minister during the Second World War. Otters devastated this school in 1945, leaving just one, but he restocked them and, in the 1950s, hand-feeding his "darlings" was still a passionate ritual.

When Harrods closed their livestock department during the Second World War, Churchill agreed to give refuge to their stock of fish at Chartwell.

After the war, a small boy brought some black mollies to his London address as a birthday gift. As these were tropical fish, Churchill arranged for them to be sent to Chartwell where a suitable aquarium was set up for them. Churchill admired these fish too and enjoyed feeding them personally. When he became Prime Minister again, he had five tanks of tropical fish installed at Chequers.

== Horses ==
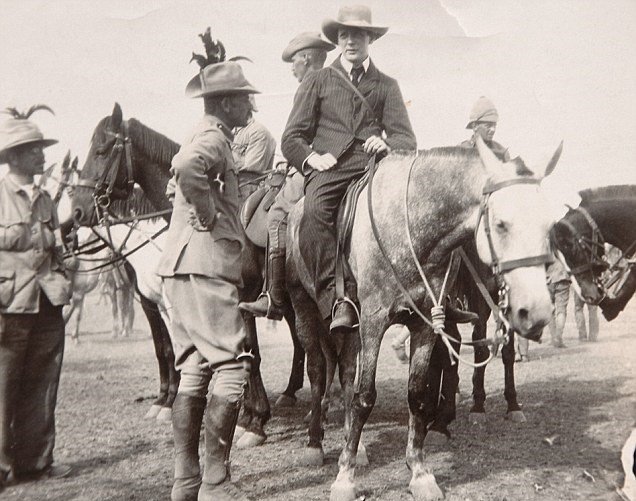
Churchill rode horses during his military career and then owned and bred racehorses in his old age. Here he is seen riding after his famous exploit of escaping from a Boer prison camp.

Churchill's parents were keen equestrians and he was born prematurely after his mother had a rough ride in a pony trap. He was an accident-prone and frail child and rode horses in his youth as a way of developing and displaying physical courage. This started at the age of seven with rides on a pony called Rob Roy at Blenheim Palace, which was his grandfather's estate.

As a military cadet at Sandhurst, he came second in the equestrian exam. He participated in numerous equestrian sports at this time including fox hunting, point-to-point and steeplechase. He was especially keen on polo and scored a hat-trick to win the Inter-Regimental Cup for the 4th Queen's Own Hussars at Meerut in 1898. His enthusiasm for polo continued into later life and he maintained a stable of polo ponies at Chartwell. His last game was at the age of 52, against Admiral of the Fleet, Roger Keyes.

As a 23-year-old lieutenant, Churchill served with the 21st Lancers at the Battle of Omdurman in 1898. He led a troop of lancers in the last major cavalry charge of the British Army, in which the regiment charged a force of dervishes which was unexpectedly strong, as thousands were concealed in a depression. Churchill also fought in the Boer War, serving in the South African Light Horse.

== Swans ==
Black swans at Chartwell

Churchill was very fond of his flock of black swans.

Sir Philip Sassoon gave Churchill his first pair of black swans in 1927. Soon after their arrival at Chartwell, a wire fence was erected around the upper lake to protect them from his mute swan named Jupiter, whom Churchill described as "irate". In a letter to Sassoon, he marvelled that the black swans "sing to one another beautifully, and dance minuets with their necks." By spring, the swans had established a modus vivendi; Churchill reported that his black swans even allowed the female white swan Juno to visit the upper lake as long as she behaved.

The black swans mated, as did their offspring with each other, and by 1935 there was a small herd. In July 1938, three of the black swans left Chartwell in what biographer Stefan Buczacki has called "a celebrated avian burst for freedom". Buczacki writes, "the local and national press pounced on the story and accounts ensued of 'Chartwell black swans' being spotted on the Thames, at Dartford, at Sheerness, heading for the Isle of Wight and across much of southern England".

In 1942, Dr. Herbert Evatt, the Australian Minister for External Affairs, arranged to have two black swans sent to Churchill after one of his male swans had died. The swans, obtained by the Melbourne Zoo, were sent in separate ships to safeguard them from a possible submarine attack. Evatt stated that in return, Australia would be receiving assistance from the United Kingdom in the form of "certain other things of much more consequence" to the war effort. In 1946, Churchill wrote to Australian prime minister Ben Chifley that "The male swan has died at the hands of its truculent spouse." Arrangements were subsequently made to send five more black swans to Chartwell.

Churchill painted The Black Swans at Chartwell in 1948. That year, one of his female black swans was killed by a fox, leading him to send her six cygnets and their father to be looked after temporarily at the London Zoo at Regent's Park. In 1949, Sir Duncan Ross McLarty, the premier of Western Australia, had two more pairs sent to Churchill from the South Perth Zoological Gardens as a gift from the people of Western Australia. In 1950, Churchill was famously photographed feeding his black swans.

When one of his eight remaining swans escaped from Chartwell in June 1954, Churchill advertised in the Sevenoaks Chronicle, offering a £5 reward for information leading to its recovery. Number 10 Downing Street issued an announcement that the missing swan had a "white-ringed red beak"; the identifying mark was a small "V-sign" on its bill. To Churchill's joy, six days after the disappearance, an "exhausted" black swan which initially appeared to match the description was found at a farm near Uden in the Netherlands. However, the mystery deepened when a Dutch zoo announced that it, too, was looking for a missing black swan, and a second black swan was sighted southeast of Rotterdam. A Dutch ornithologist examined the first swan on behalf of the British Embassy, but reported back that the evidence was inconclusive. The first swan was eventually determined not to belong to Churchill, when the swan's mate belonging to a zookeeper in Overloon picked him out of a police line-up of six swans.

Arabella Churchill later recalled being chased by the black swans at Chartwell as a child, and being rescued by her grandfather. One of the last letters signed by Winston Churchill before his death was a letter to Australian prime minister Robert Menzies dated June 1964, thanking him for sending a new pair of swans.

== See also ==
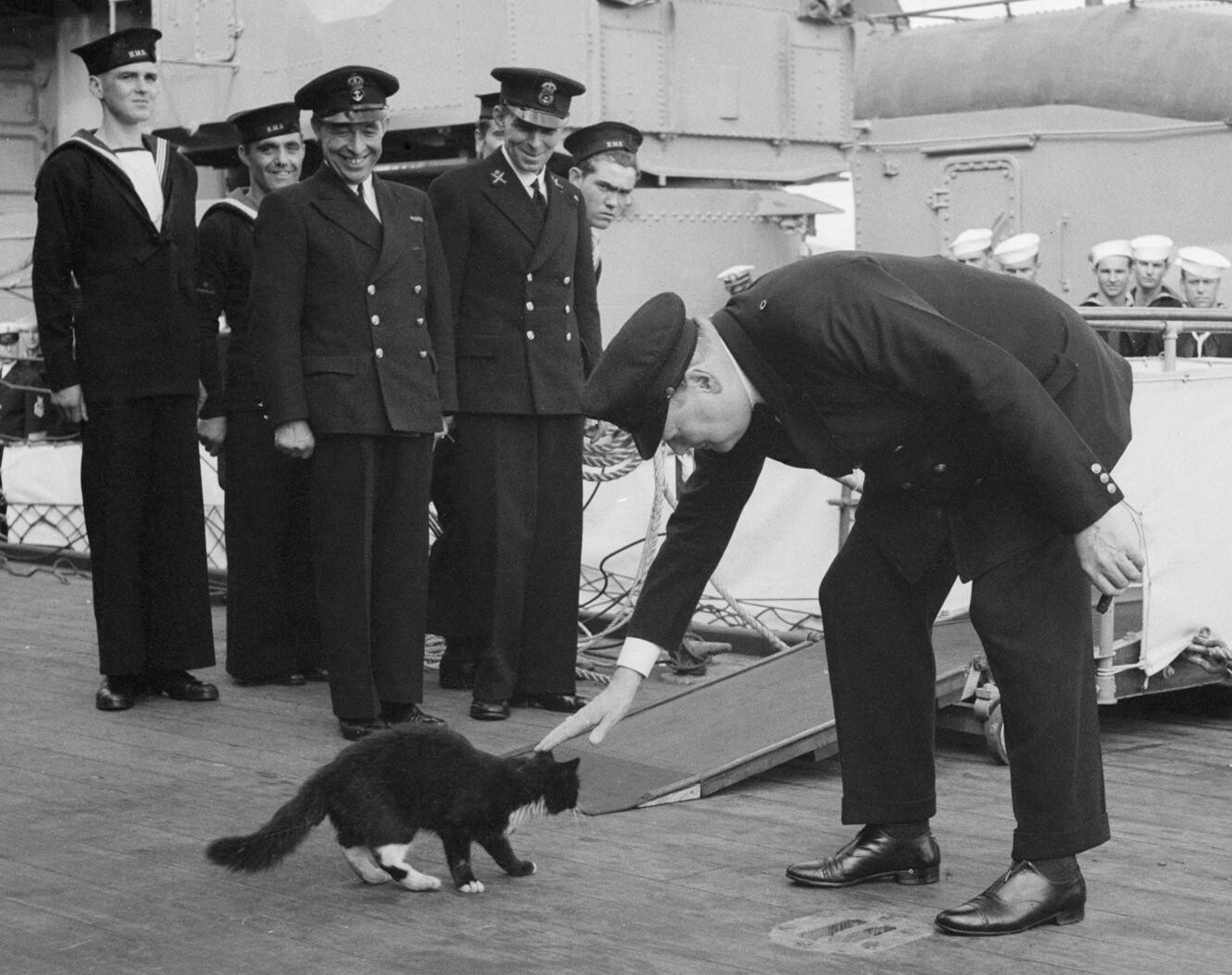
Petting the ship's mascot of HMS Prince of Wales

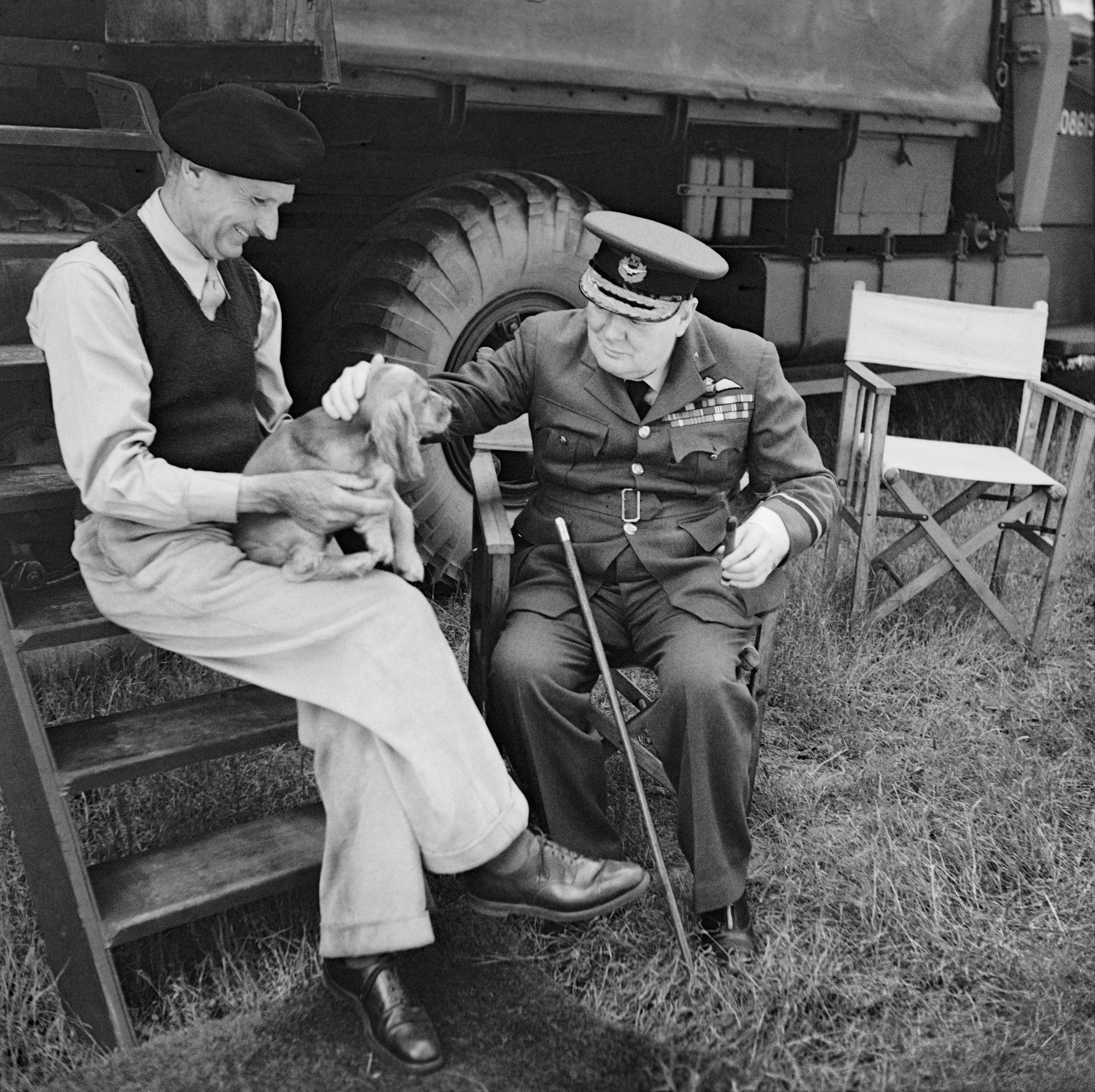
Churchill petting Monty's dog, Rommel

- Chief Mouser to the Cabinet Office
- Pets of British royalty
