= Pet (disambiguation) =

A pet is an animal kept primarily for company, protection or entertainment.

Pet or PET may also refer to:

== Science and technology ==
=== Science ===
- Polyethylene terephthalate, a common plastic material in the polyester family
- Paired-end tag, a short sequence at the end of a DNA fragment
- Photoinduced electron transfer, a process of electron transfer under action of light
- Pólya enumeration theorem, a mathematical theorem in enumerative combinatorics
- Potential evapotranspiration, a measure of the atmospheric demand for water vapour from evaporation and transpiration
- pET, a series of cloning expression vectors
- Punctuated equilibrium Theory - evolutionary biology
- Punctuated equilibrium in social theory

=== Medicine ===
- Patulous Eustachian tube, a medical disorder affecting the middle ear
- Positron emission tomography, a medical imaging technique
- Pre-eclampsia, a medical complication of pregnancy

=== Technology ===
- Commodore PET (Personal Electronic Transactor), a 1970s era personal computer
- Personal Energy Transportation, a mobility device for disabled individuals
- Privacy-enhancing technologies, a general term for a set of computer tools, applications and mechanisms

== Organizations and businesses ==
- Politiets Efterretningstjeneste, the national intelligence security agency of Denmark
- PET International, non-profit organization that promotes and supports Personal Energy Transportation
- Pet, Inc., a former American producer of evaporated milk and other food products
- Pet Airways, an American company specializing in the transportation of pets

== Arts and entertainment ==
- Personal Electronic Thing, part of the player-computer persona communications system in the Starship Titanic video game
- Personal Terminal (Mega Man), a handheld device used in the Mega Man Battle Network video games
- Pet (album), an album by Fur Patrol
- Pet (film), a 2016 American/Spanish psychological thriller
- Pet (manga), a manga series by Ranjō Miyake
- Pet (novel), a 2019 young adult speculative fiction novel by Nigerian author Akwaeke Emezi
- Pet, a forthcoming book by Chloe Dalton
- Penthouse Pet, a feature of Penthouse magazine

== Education ==
- Parent Effectiveness Training, a parent education program developed by Thomas Gordon
- Preliminary English Test, former name of the B1 Preliminary, an examination of English proficiency provided by Cambridge English
- Psychometric Entrance Test, an Israeli standardized university entrance exam

== Transport ==
- Petts Wood railway station, London, England (National Rail station code)

== Other uses ==
- Pierre Elliott Trudeau (1919–2000), nicknamed PET, former Prime Minister of Canada
- PET (time), the time zone for Peru
- Potentially Exempt Transfer, a concept in the inheritance tax code of the United Kingdom
- Presidential Electoral Tribunal, an electoral tribunal in the Philippines
- Pet., abbreviation of Petitioner, a person who pleads with governmental institution for a legal remedy or a redress of grievances
- Pet., abbreviation for reports by Richard Peters (reporter) (1780–1848), reporter of decisions of the Supreme Court of the United States

== See also ==
- Pets (disambiguation)
- Peta (disambiguation)
