= Pettai =

Pettai (Tamil, 'place' or 'colony') may refer to the following places in India:

== India ==
- Pettai, Cuddalore, Tamil Nadu
- Pettai, Tirunelveli, Tamil Nadu
- Pettai, Villupuram, Tamil Nadu
- Pettai, Karaikal, Pondicherry

== See also ==
- Pettah (disambiguation)
- Petta (disambiguation)
- Patti (disambiguation)
- "Pettai Rap", a song from the Kaadhalan film soundtrack
