= Goulburn Valley Grammar School =

Location
- 455 Verney Road; Shepparton, Victoria, 3630; Australia; 36°19′37″S 145°24′48″E

Information
- Type: private school
- Motto: Semper Ulterius (Always Further)
- Denomination: Non denominational
- Founded: 1981
- Founder: Victor Ryall
- Principal: Mark Torriero
- Teaching staff: 73 (2016)
- Years offered: 5–12
- Gender: Co-educational
- Enrolment: 693 (2017)
- Campus type: Rural
- Houses: Dunlop; Fairley; McLennan; Ryall
- Colours: Gold & navy blue
- Publication: Nexus
- Yearbook: FullFlight
- Website: gvgs.vic.edu.au

Goulburn Valley Grammar School (or GVGS) is a private, co-educational school in Victoria situated on a 17 hectare rural site 6 km north of the centre of Shepparton, approximately 190 km north of Melbourne. Students from across Victoria and southern New South Wales attend, with students from Benalla, Seymour, Cobram, Numurkah, Yarrawonga, Tocumwal, Euroa, Moama, Echuca and Nagambie all undertaking the daily bus trip.

The school was founded in 1982 by Vic Ryall, and now admits students from Years 5–12. In 2008 a new principal was appointed, Mark Torriero. He succeeded Ian Rule, who had been in the position of Principal since 1998.

The motto of the school is Semper Ulterius, which can be translated from Latin to 'Always further', suggesting there is always something more to know or experience, and the mascot is the pelican. This was appointed to GVGS by late principal David Prest simply because pelicans were a common sight among the school grounds. The lake and wetlands on campus provided an ideal habitat for the animals.

== History ==
Goulburn Valley Grammar school was founded in 1981 (with first student intake in 1982), as a result of "local parents seeking a school striving for academic excellence and well-rounded development in the independent school tradition".

In 1998, the school launched a fundraising campaign to construct a complex which would operate as "the heart of the school where the whole school community could come together", including a foyer, toilets and kitchen component. The complex, now known as Founders Hall, was hoped for completion in 1999, with a capacity of 510 people.

In 2000, GVGS student Ashlee Good (Year 9) was one of eight Echuca residents to carry the 2000 Summer Olympic torch through Echuca.

== Houses ==
The school has four houses Dunlop, Fairley, McLennan and Ryall. The houses were names after Edward "Weary" Dunlop, Sir Andrew Fairley (AM), Ian McLennan and founding principal Vic Ryall. The house colours are Blue for Dunlop, Red for Fairley, Green for McLennan and Yellow for Ryall. Students from these houses complete annually in the school Swimming, Athletics, Cross-Country, and Eisteddfod Competitions.

== Principals ==
Principal	Years acting
Victor G Ryall	1982–1989
Kevin J Bacon	1990–1991
David Prest AM	1992–1997
Ian C Rule	1998–2008
Mark Torriero	2009–present

== Notable alumni ==
=== Media ===
- Xavier Di Petta – Entrepreneur (Class of 2014)

=== Sportspeople ===
- Matt Whitlock – (AFL) (Class of 2024)
- Jack Whitlock – (AFL) (Class of 2024)
- Ollie Wines – (AFL – Brownlow Medal 2021) (Class of 2012)
- Clayton Oliver – (AFL) (Class of 2015)
- Josh Schache – (AFL) (Class of 2015)
- Alex Keath – (AFL, Cricketer)
- Luke Lowden – (AFL)
- Jordon Butts – (AFL) (Class of 2018)

== Academic results ==
=== 2007 Academic results ===
Summary of Class of 2007 results

31% of students gained a score of over 90 on the Equivalent National Tertiary Entrance Rank (ENTER), with 18% scoring over 95. Four students scored over 99 and 57% of students received an ENTER of above 80 placing them in the top 20% of the state. The median score was 81.40.

=== 2010 Academic results ===
Summary of Class of 2010 results

More than half the students (53%) achieved a score of over 80 on the Australian Tertiary Admission Rank (ATAR), with 17% of students achieved a score of over 90 and 12% scoring over 95. Four Goulburn Valley Grammar School students achieved ATAR scores in excess of 99.

Summary of results:

- 81% of all students achieved an ATAR of 60+, placing them in the top 40% of the State
- 66% of all students achieved an ATAR of 70+, placing them in the top 30% of the State
- 53% of all students achieved an ATAR of 80+, placing them in the top 20% of the State
- 17% of all students achieved an ATAR of 90+, placing them in the top 10% of the State
- 12% of all students achieved an ATAR of 95+, placing them in the top 5% of the State
- 4 students achieved ATAR scores of 99 or above
- 3 perfect study scores of 50 were achieved
- 81 was the Median ATAR score
- 34 was the Median study score
- 17.6% of all study scores were 40 or more

=== 2011 Academic results ===
Summary of Class of 2011 results

Rank (ATAR) placing them in the top 30% of the State. A quarter of students (25%) achieved a score over 90 which placed them in the top 10% of the State. 10% of students achieved a score over 95 placing them in the top 5% of the State. In 2011 three students achieved an ATAR score over 99 placing them in the top 1% of the State, with James O'Callaghan scoring a perfect score of 99.95.

- 3 Students achieved ATAR scores of 99 or above
- 3 perfect study scores of 50 were achieved
- 78 was the Median ATAR score
- 33 was the Median study score
- 14% of all study scores were 40 or more
- 94 students completed year 12 and applied for an ATAR score

=== 2015 Academic results ===
Summary of Class of 2015 results

A total of 98 students completed VCE in 2015 to receive an ATAR. Of these 98, 79 (81%) received an ATAR of over 70, placing them in the top 30% of the state. In total, two students (across three subjects) scored a perfect study score of 50, and five students scored an ATAR of 99 or above, placing them in the top 1% of the state. Henry Fox achieved a score of 99.75, resulting in him receiving the 2015 Dux.

Summary of results:

- 81% of all students achieved an ATAR of 70+, placing them in the top 30% of the State
- 62% of all students achieved an ATAR of 80+, placing them in the top 20% of the State
- 26% of all students achieved an ATAR of 90+, placing them in the top 10% of the State
- 17% of all students achieved an ATAR of 95+, placing them in the top 5% of the State
- 9% of all students achieved an ATAR of 98+, placing them in the top 2% of the State
- 21% of study scores were 40+
- 83.45 was the median ATAR score
- 35 was the median study score

=== 2016 Academic results ===
Summary of Class of 2016 results

A total of 100 students completed VCE in 2015 to receive an ATAR. Of these 100, 78 received an ATAR score above 70, placing them in the top 30% of results Statewide. There were six perfect study-scores of 50, and two ATAR scores of above 99. The dux of 2016 was Janna Lawson with an ATAR of 99.50. GVGS gained a statewide school ranking of #32.

Summary of results:

- 78% of all students achieved an ATAR of 70+, placing them in the top 30% of the State
- 63% of all students achieved an ATAR of 80+, placing them in the top 20% of the State
- 37% of all students achieved an ATAR of 90+, placing them in the top 10% of the State
- 22% of all students achieved an ATAR of 95+, placing them in the top 5% of the State
- 6% of all students achieved an ATAR of 98+, placing them in the top 2% of the State
- 23% of study scores were 40+
- 85.20 was the median ATAR score
- 35 was the median study score

=== 2017 Academic results ===
Summary of Class of 2017 results

A total of 91 students received an ATAR score in 2017. Of these 91, the dux was Mitchell Collins with an ATAR of 99.40.

Summary of results:

- 75% of all students achieved an ATAR of 70+, placing them in the top 30% of the State
- 53% of all students achieved an ATAR of 80+, placing them in the top 20% of the State
- 25% of all students achieved an ATAR of 90+, placing them in the top 10% of the State
- 13% of all students achieved an ATAR of 95+, placing them in the top 5% of the State
- 7% of all students achieved an ATAR of 98+, placing them in the top 2% of the State
- 17% of study scores were 40+
- 81.35 was the median ATAR score
- 34 was the median study score

=== 2018 Academic results ===
Summary of Class of 2018 results

The 2018 dux was Aditya Ryan Bhat with an ATAR of 99.99.

Summary of results:

- 72% of all students achieved an ATAR of 70+, placing them in the top 30% of the State
- 51% of all students achieved an ATAR of 80+, placing them in the top 20% of the State
- 29% of all students achieved an ATAR of 90+, placing them in the top 10% of the State
- 19% of all students achieved an ATAR of 95+, placing them in the top 5% of the State
- 4 students achieved an ATAR of 99+, placing them in the top 2% of the State
- 4 students achieved a perfect study score of 50
- 81.15 was the median ATAR score
- 34 was the median study score

=== 2021 Academic results ===
Summary of Class of 2022 results

The dux of 2021 was Sarah Roberts with an ATAR of 99.8.

Summary of results:

- 72% of all students achieved an ATAR of 70+, placing them in the top 30% of the State
- 57% of all students achieved an ATAR of 80+, placing them in the top 20% of the State
- 34% of all students achieved an ATAR of 90+, placing them in the top 10% of the State
- 21% of all students achieved an ATAR of 95+, placing them in the top 5% of the State
- 17.4% of study scores were 40+
- 34 was the median study score

=== 2022 Academic results ===
Summary of Class of 2022 results

The dux of 2022 was Anna Howell with an ATAR of 99.75.

Summary of results:

- 75% of all students achieved an ATAR of 70+, placing them in the top 30% of the State
- 55% of all students achieved an ATAR of 80+, placing them in the top 20% of the State
- 33% of all students achieved an ATAR of 90+, placing them in the top 10% of the State
- 15% of all students achieved an ATAR of 95+, placing them in the top 5% of the State
- 5 students achieved an ATAR of 99+
- 19.5% of study scores were 40+
- 34 was the median study score

=== 2023 Academic results ===
Summary of Class of 2023 results

The dux of 2023 was Xavier Schmedje with an ATAR of 99.90.

Summary of results:

- 85% of all students achieved an ATAR of 70+, placing them in the top 30% of the State
- 63% of all students achieved an ATAR of 80+, placing them in the top 20% of the State
- 42% of all students achieved an ATAR of 90+, placing them in the top 10% of the State
- 20% of all students achieved an ATAR of 95+, placing them in the top 5% of the State
- 12 students achieved an ATAR of 97+
- 5 students achieved an ATAR of 99+
- 19.2% of study scores were 40+
- 35 was the median study score
