= Pets (disambiguation) =

Pets are animals kept primarily for company, protection or entertainment.

Pets or PETS may also refer to:

== Arts and entertainment ==
=== Film and television ===
- Pets (film), a 1974 film
- Pets (2002 film), directed by David Lister
- "Pets" (Not Going Out), a 2018 television episode
- "Pets", an episode of the television series Zoboomafoo

=== Music ===
- The Pets (1950s band)
- The Pets (2000s band)
- "Pets" (song), by Porno For Pyros

=== Video games ===
- The Sims 2: Pets, the fourth expansion pack of The Sims 2
- The Sims 3: Pets, the fifth expansion pack for The Sims 3

== Law and government ==
- Pet Travel Scheme (PETS), allowing animals to be moved between countries without quarantine, using a pet passport
- Pets Evacuation and Transportation Standards Act

== Other uses ==
- Perth Electric Tramway Society, a heritage tramway operator in Perth, Western Australia
- Pets.com, a defunct dot-com enterprise that sold pet supplies
- Positron emission tomography scan, a medical imaging technique
- Public English Test System, a language test used in Mainland China
- Public expenditure tracking system

== See also ==
- Pest (disambiguation)
- Pet (disambiguation)
