= Jersey (soundtrack) =

2019 soundtrack album by Anirudh Ravichander

- Soundtrack album cover

Soundtrack album by Anirudh Ravichander
- Released: 17 April 2019
- Recorded: 2018–2019
- Studios: Albuquerque Records, Chennai
- Genre: Feature film soundtrack
- Length: 21:35
- Language: Telugu
- Label: Zee Music Company
- Producer: Anirudh Ravichander

Anirudh Ravichander chronology
Petta (2019)	Jersey (2019)	Thumbaa (2019)
External audio
- Official Audio Jukebox on YouTube

Singles from Jersey
- 1. "Adhento Gaani Vunnapaatuga" Released: 14 February 2019; 2. "Spirit Of Jersey" Released: 7 March 2019; 3. "Padhe Padhe" Released: 31 March 2019; 4. "Prapanchame Alaa" Released: 6 April 2019; 5. "Aarambhame Le" Released: 24 April 2019

Jersey is the soundtrack album composed by Anirudh Ravichander for the 2019 Telugu film of the same name written and directed by Gowtam Tinnanuri starring Nani and Shraddha Srinath. It marks his second Telugu project after Agnyaathavaasi (2018). The soundtrack album features five songs, including two bonus tracks which were released separately and had lyrics written by Krishna Kanth. After all individual tracks from the album were released as singles, the soundtrack in its entirety, was released through Zee Music Company on 17 April 2019.

== Release ==
On the occasion of Valentine's Day, 14 February 2019, Anirudh Ravichander released the song "Adhento Gaani Vunnapaatuga" as the first single from the album. The song gained applause from music buffs for "retaining the freshness in the melody". The video promo of this song was later released during the festival of Holi (21 March 2019) which also received positive response from viewers. The song was also made in Tamil titled "Marakkavillayae" with Anirudh providing vocals for this version and Vignesh Shivan writing the lyrics. It was released on the same day, with the original Telugu single, as Vignesh and Anirudh had earlier released independent singles on this occasion.

"Spirit of Jersey" was released as the film's second single on 7 March 2019. Sung by Kaala Bhairava, it is a motivational number focused on Arjun's (Nani) return to cricket. Neetishta Nyayapati of The Times of India stated the song as "inspiring". On 21 March 2019, the third song "Padhe Padhe", a romantic number pictured between Arjun and Sarah (Shraddha Srinath) was released, which had vocals by Anirudh, Shakthishree Gopalan and Brodha V, crooning the rap portions. "Prapanchame Alaa" is focused on Arjun's love for his son Nani. The song rendered by Shashaa Tirupati and Inno Genga was released as the fourth single on 6 April 2019. Calling it as "beautiful beyond imaginations", Khushboo Ratda of Pinkvilla stated "Anirudh Ravichander's music wins heart".

"Needa Padadhani", the fifth song sung by Darshan Raval, released along with the film's soundtrack album on 17 April 2019. Despite the album being released, the makers unveiled two bonus tracks with one of the songs "Aarambhame Le", sung by Anirudh Ravichander and Srinidhi Venkatesh on 24 April 2019. Another song "Nuvvadiginadhe", sung by Sathyaprakash was released as an additional with the background score on 13 May 2019.

== Track listing ==
=== Telugu ===
All lyrics are written by Krishna Kanth; all music is composed by Anirudh Ravichander.

No.	Title	Singer(s)	Length
1.	"Adhento Gaani Vunnapaatuga"	Anirudh Ravichander	4:07
2.	"Spirit Of Jersey"	Kaala Bhairava	4:36
3.	"Padhe Padhe"	Anirudh Ravichander, Shakthisree Gopalan, Brodha V	3:34
4.	"Prapanchame Alaa"	Shashaa Tirupati, Inno Genga	4:07
5.	"Needa Padadhani"	Darshan Raval	3:29
6.	"Aarambhame Le"	Anirudh Ravichander, Srinidhi Venkatesh	1:58
Total length:			21:35

=== Tamil ===
All lyrics are written by Vignesh Shivan; all music is composed by Anirudh Ravichander.

No.	Title	Singer(s)	Length
1.	"Marakkavillaye"	Anirudh Ravichander	3:58
Total length:			3:58

== Reception ==
The album received positive reviews from critics. Neetishta Nyayapati of The Times of India, reviewed as "The album of Jersey is a must-listen, especially if you like albums that offer variety. The OST refreshingly sticks to the themes of the film, instead of meandering with regular sounding romantic and dance numbers." 123Telugu gave a verdict stating "The music of Jersey is a mixed bag as it has all kinds of numbers. The feel of the album is mostly emotional and all the songs are situational and carry the film forward. This is not the regular song and dance album which will hit you right away. The songs will please you more once you see them on screen."

Indiaglitz rated the album 3.5 out of 5 and wrote "The genres are different, Anirudh's tunes are a whiff of fresh air. The singers sound 'hatke' everywhere. The situations lend themselves to lyrics laced with high meaning." Moviecrow gave a rating of 3.75 out of 5 and stated "Anirudh hits right out of the park in his second Telugu film after Agnyathavaasi and Ananthakrishnan's (Violinist and sound engineer) combination with Anirudh continues to give splendid result in the overall soundtrack quality from the composer." Critic based at Mirchi9 stated the album as "a classy treat with neatly blended melody" and further added: "the songs are beautiful, and upon repeat hearings, they will stay with the listener for a long time [...] The issue here is not the quality rather the popularity. The songs, for all the beautiful words, are not chartbuster types. They also lack mass appeal. Irrespective of how the album fares, the mere presence needs to be appreciated."

Writing for the news publication The Hindu, Krishna Sripada listed "Adhento Gaani Vunnapaatuga" as one of the 'Best Telugu Songs of the Decade (2010–2019)'. According to Sripada, "the 2010s saw a great mix of Telugu film albums that appealed for both their commercial as well as new-age sounds". Srivatsan Nadathur, listed the tracks "Adhento Gaani Vunnapaatuga" and "Spirit of Jersey" in the "Top 10 Telugu Songs of 2019" to The Times of India.

== Awards and nominations ==
Award (Note: Awards, festivals and organizations are in alphabetical order.)	Date of ceremony (Note: Date is linked to the article about the awards held that year, wherever possible.)	Category	Recipient(s)	Result	Ref.
South Indian International Movie Awards	18 September 2021	Best Music Director – Telugu	Anirudh Ravichander	Nominated	
South Indian International Movie Awards	18 September 2021	Best Lyricist – Telugu	Krishna Kanth – (for "Needa Padadhani")	Nominated	
