= Pettah =

Pettah may refer to:

- Pettah of Ahmednagar, a fortified town outside the Fort of Ahmednagar stormed by British soldiers in 1803 during Second Anglo-Maratha War
- Pettah, Colombo, a neighborhood in Colombo, Sri Lanka located east of the City centre fort.
- Pettah, Thiruvananthapuram, a residential suburb of Thiruvananthapuram, the capital of Kerala, India.

== See also ==
- Petta (disambiguation)
- Pettai (disambiguation)
- Pita (disambiguation)
- Pitta (disambiguation)
