= Petta (soundtrack) =

2018 soundtrack album by Anirudh Ravichander

- Soundtrack album cover

Soundtrack album by Anirudh Ravichander
- Released: 9 December 2018
- Recorded: 2018
- Studios: Albuquerque Records, Chennai; AM Studios, Chennai; Kodhandapani Audio Labs, Chennai; Tapas Studios, Chennai; Knack Studios, Chennai
- Genre: Feature film soundtrack
- Length: 27:43
- Language: Tamil
- Label: Sony Music
- Producer: Anirudh Ravichander

Anirudh Ravichander chronology
Kolamaavu Kokila (2018)	Petta (2018)	Jersey (2019)

Singles from Petta
- 1. "Marana Mass" Released: 3 December 2018; 2. "Ullallaa" Released: 7 December 2018

Petta is the soundtrack album composed by Anirudh Ravichander, for the 2019 Indian Tamil-language action drama film of the same name, directed by Karthik Subbaraj and produced by Sun Pictures, starring Rajinikanth. The film marks Anirudh's maiden collaboration with the director and actor. The accompanying soundtrack consisted of 11 songs—six musical numbers with the lyrics by Vivek, Ku. Karthik, Dhanush and Subbaraj, and five instrumental themes.

The album was preceded by two singles: "Marana Mass" and "Ullallaa", released on 3 and 7 December 2018. The soundtrack was distributed by Sony Music India and released at a promotional event on 9 December 2018. The music received positive reviews from critics and audiences.

== Development ==
On 1 March 2018, Sun Pictures announced that Anirudh Ravichander would compose music for the film marking his maiden collaboration with Rajinikanth and Subbaraj. Subbaraj who usually associated with Santhosh Narayanan for all of his films, chose to work with Anirudh as the film demanded a different flavor of music. Anirudh described the film as a "mix of mass and class" and further added that "Generally, Karthik's films will have scope for music and the work is going on a full swing. I'm also planning to deliver the music as a Thalaivar fan but will ensure that it should appeal to all music listeners." In September 2018, he shared a glimpse of the film's recording session where the musicians recorded the theme that featured in the film's motion poster.

== Composition ==
The soundtrack to Petta featured six songs and five instrumental tracks. The first song "Marana Mass" featured vocals performed by Anirudh and S. P. Balasubrahmanyam and lyrics written by Vivek. It is an introductory number for Rajinikanth's character Kaali, which featured heavy arrangements of drums, percussions and parai; it was also the first time Balasubrahmanyam had recorded an introduction song for Rajinikanth since Lingaa (2014). Balasubrahmanyam had recorded few lines of the song, which led to the disappointment of music enthusiasts. However, the singer revealed in an interview that he had no issue with it and the team felt that his voice was required for the song. The song's title was also used for a 2025 Malayalam language film.

"Ilamai Thirumbudhe" is a romantic ballad number picturized on Rajinikanth and Simran. Anirudh recorded the vocals for the song which had lyrics written by Dhanush; the composer and actor reunite after three years since Thanga Magan (2015). "Petta Paraak" is an elevation number performed by Anirudh and written by Vivek. "Aaha Kalyanam" is a kuthu number picturized on a marriage that is showcased in the flashback portions. Anthony Daasan performed the song with lyrics by Ku. Karthik; Daasan had previously recorded "Kattikida" from Kaaki Sattai (2015) and "Sodakku" from Thaanaa Serndha Koottam (2018).

"Ullallaa" is a dance number performed by Nakash Aziz and Inno Genga. Aziz recalled that "They say you got to keep a cool mind. I knew I was singing for Rajini sir. This is the time I've been waiting for in my career. I'm sure every singer is waiting for such a moment. I was just happy that God had given me this opportunity to be a part of such a nice film, and I was just celebrating the fact." Subbaraj had also written lyrics for the Hindi song "Thappad Maara" which was performed by Sarwar Khan and Sartaz Khan Barna. This song was excluded from the film. The instrumental tracks included the film's main theme, character themes for Kaali, Jithu (Vijay Sethupathi) and Singaar Singh (Nawazuddin Siddiqui) and a theme for the film's flashback portion, set in Madurai.

== Release ==
"Marana Mass" was the first single from the album. It was released on 3 December 2018 as a lyrical video on the official YouTube channel of Sun TV. It was then released into music streaming platforms three days later, after Sony Music India acquired the film's soundtrack and marketing rights. The second single "Ullallaa" was released through YouTube and Sun NXT as a lyrical video on 7 December 2018.

The film's soundtrack was released on 9 December 2018. The release coincided with a promotional launch event held at Sai Leo Muthu Indoor Stadium, Sri Sai Ram Engineering College, Chennai, with the cast and crew in attendance. The event was aired live on Sun TV.

== Critical reception ==
StudioFlicks rated the album 3 out of 5, and stated "On the whole, Petta is completely a tribute from Anirudh and his entire team for Thalaivar Rajnikanth. Apart from all the other factors of analysis, Petta does an impeccable justice to the Rajinikanth fans league." Sharanya CR of The Times of India wrote "Anirudh has gone all out for this Petta album, both as a fan and as a composer. Electrifying and marana mass, for sure!" Vikram Venkateswaran of The Quint wrote "Overall, Petta's songs are definitely better than Kaala or 2.0's jukeboxes. The tunes are more catchy, the lyrics easier to remember and the rhyme and rhythm kick in from the word go. There's no ominous sense of doom or stories of hate and oppression to deal with. The music is upbeat and oozes a positive vibe from start to finish."

In contrast, Karthik Srinivasan of Milliblog expressed some discontent and stated that "Karthik Subbaraj's shift from Santhosh Narayanan, for his biggest film, seems like a blunder." S Subhakeerthana of The Indian Express wrote "Anirudh Ravichander's apt background score and music also help Petta which has all the must-haves of a Rajinikanth film." Srinivasa Ramanujam of The Hindu wrote "Anirudh also gets in a couple of foot-tapping numbers, though they do come across as speed-breakers in an otherwise smooth tale." Kirubhakar Purushothaman of India Today wrote "Talking about music, from Mass Maranam to Petta Paraak, Anirudh Ravichander's racy numbers are exactly what the film needed. Not just the music for Rajinikanth; even the background music for Singaar Singh and Jithu are just well thought out."

== Commercial reception ==
In February 2019, the album crossed 250 million streams on all platforms. In January 2022, "Marana Mass" hit 200+ million views in YouTube.

== Track listing ==
Tamil
No.	Title	Lyrics	Artist(s)	Length
1.	"Marana Mass"	Vivek	Anirudh Ravichander, S. P. Balasubrahmanyam	3:36
2.	"Petta Theme"	—	Instrumental	1:45
3.	"Ilamai Thirumbuthe"	Dhanush	Anirudh Ravichander	3:37
4.	"Madura Petta"	—	Instrumental	1:18
5.	"Petta Paraak"	Vivek	Anirudh Ravichander, Chorus	3:57
6.	"Singaar Singh Theme"	—	Instrumental	1:24
7.	"Aaha Kalyanam"	Ku. Karthik	Anthony Daasan	2:54
8.	"Jithu Theme"	—	Instrumental	1:12
9.	"Ullaallaa"	Vivek	Nakash Aziz, Inno Genga	4:56
10.	"Kaali Theme"	—	Instrumental	1:05
11.	"Thappad Maara"	Karthik Subbaraj	Sarwar Khan, Sartaz Khan Barna	1:57
Total length:				27:43

Telugu
No.	Title	Lyrics	Artist(s)	Length
1.	"Massu Maranam"	Anantha Sriram	Anirudh Ravichander, Mano	3:36
2.	"Petta Theme"	—	Instrumental	1:45
3.	"Peydhavi Chivarakey"	Bhaskarabhatla	Vijay Prakash	3:37
4.	"Vizag Petta"	—	Instrumental	1:18
5.	"Petta Paraak"	Chandrabose	Nakul Abhyankar, Chorus	3:57
6.	"Simhaasalam Singh Theme"	—	Instrumental	1:24
7.	"Aaha Kalyanam"	Sri Sai Kiran	Rahul Sipligunj	2:54
8.	"Jithu Theme"	—	Instrumental	1:12
9.	"Ullaallaa"	Ramajogayya Sastry	Nakash Aziz, Inno Genga	4:56
10.	"Kaali Theme"	—	Instrumental	1:05
11.	"Thappad Maara"	Karthik Subbaraj	Sarwar Khan, Sartaz Khan Barna	1:57
Total length:				27:43

Hindi
No.	Title	Lyrics	Artist(s)	Length
1.	"Mass Marudaan"	Raqueeb Alam	Anirudh Ravichander, Mano	3:36
2.	"Petta Theme"	—	Instrumental	1:45
3.	"Nazar Sarsari"	Raqueeb Alam	Darshan Raval	3:37
4.	"Madura Petta"	—	Instrumental	1:18
5.	"Petta Paraak"	Raqueeb Alam	Nakul Abhyankar, Chorus	3:57
6.	"Singaar Singh Theme"	—	Instrumental	1:24
7.	"Ye Shadiyaana"	Raqueeb Alam	Rahul Sipligunj	2:54
8.	"Jithu Theme"	—	Instrumental	1:12
9.	"Ullaallaa"	Raqueeb Alam	Nakash Aziz, Inno Genga	4:56
10.	"Kaali Theme"	—	Instrumental	1:05
11.	"Thappad Maara"	Karthik Subbaraj	Sarwar Khan, Sartaz Khan Barna	1:57
Total length:				27:43

== Background score ==
Petta (Original Background Score)

Film score by Anirudh Ravichander
- Released: 3 February 2019
- Recorded: 2018
- Genre: Feature film soundtrack
- Length: 19:45
- Language: Tamil
- Label: Sony Music
- Producer: Anirudh Ravichander
External audio
- Petta – BGM (Original Background Score) on YouTube

The film score by Anirudh Ravichander, featured 15 tracks. It was released by Sony Music on 3 February 2019.

No.	Title	Length
1.	"Church Fight"	3:38
2.	"Thalaivar Intro"	0:41
3.	"Chef Kaali"	1:21
4.	"Itemkaaran"	1:07
5.	"Thalaivar Romance"	0:44
6.	"Market Fight"	1:24
7.	"Nunchaku Theme"	0:45
8.	"Kaali Helps in Love"	0:35
9.	"Torchlight Fight"	1:19
10.	"Revenge of Petta"	1:00
11.	"Petta Velan Intro"	0:28
12.	"Anwar Is Born"	3:20
13.	"Rhythm of Petta"	0:52
14.	"Petta Theme Extended"	1:24
15.	"Kutti Kadhai"	0:59
Total length:		19:45

== Personnel credits ==
Credits adapted from Sony Music South:

=== Soundtrack album ===
- All music composed, arranged and produced by – Anirudh Ravichander (composer, arranger)
- Lyricists – Vivek, Ku. Karthik, Karthik Subbaraj, Dhanush
- Singers – Anirudh Ravichander, S. P. Balasubrahmanyam, Anthony Daasan, Nakash Aziz, Inno Genga, Sarwar Khan, Sartaz Khan Barna

Musician credits

- Backing vocalists – KaKa Balachander, Inno Genga, Ananthakrrishnan, Shashank Vijay, Arjun Chandy, Sarath Santhosh, Narayanan Ravishankar, Aravind Srinivas, Nadisha Thomas, Alisha Thomas, Maria Roe Vincent
- Guitar – Keba Jeremiah
- Bass – Naveen Napier
- Trumpet – Thomas, Ben, Maxwell, Babu
- Trombone – Maxwell, Babu
- French horn – Thomas
- Flugel horn – Ben
- Rhythm and percussions – Krishna Kishore
- Percussionists – Ribash Naik, Dillu Naik, Bikash Naik, Ashok Naik, Guddu Naik, Ajaya Naik, Subash Naik (Maa Dhakinakali Singha Baja, Orissa)
- Rhythm conductor – MT Aditya, Ananthakrishnan
- Rhythm editor – Rajesh Kannan, Ishaan Chhabra
- Rhythm co-ordinator – Srivijay Rajasekar, Jagadish
- Strings – Seenu
- Keyboards, synth, rhythm and electronic programming – Anirudh Ravichander
- Additional rhythm – Shashank Vijay, Nagi, Siddharth Venkat, Krishna Kishore
- Orchestral programming and arrangements – Ishaan Chhabra

Production credits

- Music supervisor – Harish Raam L. H., Srinidhi Venkatesh
- Music advisor – Ananthakrishnan
- Creative consultant – Sajith Sathya
- Recording engineers – Srinivasan M., Ananthakrishnan, Vinay Sridhar (Albuquerque Records, Chennai), S. Sivakumar, Pradeep Menon, Manoj Raman, Aravind MS, Aditya Ganesh (AM Studios, Chennai), K. S. Maniratnam (Tapas Studios, Chennai), Kannu Kumaran (Kodhandapani Audio Labs, Chennai), Rajesh Kannan, Srinidhi Venkatesh, Vignesh (Knack Studios, Chennai)
- Mixing – Vinay Sridhar, Srinivasan M., Ishaan Chhabra (Albuquerque Records, Chennai)
- Mastering – Shadab Rayeen (New Edge Studios, Mumbai)
- Musician coordinators – R. Samidurai, B. Velavan

=== Film score ===
- Background score composed, arranged, programmed, produced by – Anirudh Ravichander

Musician credits

- Acoustic, electric and bass guitar – Keba Jeremiah
- Sax, clarinet, oboe – Raja
- Mandolin, oud, saz, banjo, ryan, santoor – Seenu
- Flute – Kareem Kamalakar
- Veena – Rajhesh Vaidya
- Nadaswaram – Thirumoorthy, Ramesh, D. Balasubramani
- Horns – Thomas, Ben, Maxwell, Babu
- Solo trumpet – Maxwell
- Solo violin – Ananthakrrishnan
- Rhythm programming – Shashank Vijay
- Orchestral programming and arrangements – Ishaan Chhabra
- Piano, keyboards and synth programming – Anirudh Ravichander

Fame's Macedonian Symphony Orchestra

- Conductor – Oleg Kondratenko
- Sound recordist – Alen Hadzi Stefanov
- Pro-tools operator – Igor Vasilev
- Stage managers – Riste Trajkovski, Ilija Grkovski
- Orchestrators – Joaquim Badia, Neelesh Mandalapu, Taylor Ambrosio Wood
- Orchestra co-ordinator – Andrew T. Mackay at Bohemia Junction Ltd.

28PRODUCTION Symphonic Orchestra, Bangkok

- Conductor – Trisdee na Patalung
- Session producer – Sathapat Sangsuwan
- Orchestra manager – Thitanon Kollasathsenee
- Production staff – Peerasit Koosrivinij
- Chief sound engineer – Jake Craig
- Assistant sound engineer – Patrick Chinnawong, Arjampol Chandravuth

Chennai Strings Orchestra, Chennai

- Conductor – Kannan, Yensone Bhagyanathan
- Sound engineers – Rajesh Kannan
- Orchestra supervisors – Ishaan Chhabra, Ananthakrrishnan, Mervin Solomon

Production credits

- Music advisor – Ananthakrrishnan
- Music supervisors – Harish Ram L. H., Srinivasan M.
- Recording supervisor – Srinidhi Venkatesh
- Sound engineers – Srinivasan M., Ananthakrrishnan (Albuquerque Records, Chennai), Rajesh Kannan, Vignesh (Knack Studios, Chennai)
- Score mixing – Vinay Sridhar (Knack Studios, Chennai)
- Stereo mastering – Srinivasan M.
- Music co-ordinator – B. Velavan

== Accolades ==
Award (Note: Awards, festivals and organizations are in alphabetical order.)	Date of ceremony (Note: Date is linked to the article about the awards held that year, wherever possible.)	Category	Recipient(s)	Result	Ref.
Ananda Vikatan Cinema Awards	11 January 2020	Best Music Director	Anirudh Ravichander	Nominated	
Ananda Vikatan Cinema Awards	11 January 2020	Best Playback Singer – Male	Nakash Aziz ("Ullallaa")	Nominated	
Ananda Vikatan Cinema Awards	11 January 2020	Best Playback Singer – Male	Anirudh Ravichander ("Petta Paraak")	Nominated	
Edison Awards	12 January 2020	Best Music Director	Anirudh Ravichander	Nominated	
Edison Awards	12 January 2020	Best BGM Score	Anirudh Ravichander	Nominated	
Edison Awards	12 January 2020	Best Playback Singer – Male	Anirudh Ravichander ("Ilamai Thirumbudhe")	Nominated	
South Indian International Movie Awards	18–19 September 2021	Best Music Director – Tamil	Anirudh Ravichander	Nominated	
