= Peta (given name) =

Peta is a feminine given name. Notable individual with this name include:

== People ==
=== Women ===
- Peta Brady (born 1972), Australian actress
- Peta Buscombe, Baroness Buscombe (born 1954), English barrister and politician
- Peta Credlin (born c. 1970), Australian political adviser and Chief of Staff
- Peta Edebone (born 1969), Australian softball player and Olympic medalist
- Peta Gallagher (born 1977), Australian field hockey striker
- Peta Lewin (born 1971), Bermudian sailor
- Peta Lily (Peta Wilhelmina Gottschalk), London-based physical theatre performer and director
- Peta Lindsay (born 1984), American anti-war activist
- Peta Mathias, New Zealand food writer
- Peta Merrilees (born 1982), Australian cricketer
- Peta Mullens (born 1988), Australian racing cyclist
- Peta Murgatroyd (born 1986), New Zealand/Australian professional dancer
- Peta Murphy (1973–2023), Australian politician
- Peta Murray, Australian writer
- Peta Roby, Australian dancer and choreographer
- Peta Rutter (1959–2010) New Zealand actress
- Peta Scholz (born 1976), Australian netball player
- Peta Searle, Australian rules footballer and coach
- Peta Seaton (born 1959), Australian politician
- Peta Sergeant, Australian actress
- Peta Sherlock, Australian Anglican priest
- Peta Stephens (born 1978), Australian netball player
- Peta Taylor (1912–1989), English cricketer
- Peta Todd (born 1986), English glamour model
- Peta Toppano (born 1951), British-born Australian actress born Peita Toppano
- Peta Verco (born 1956), Australian cricketer
- Peta White (born 1991), Australian rower
- Peta Wilson (born 1970), Australian actress and model

=== Men ===
- Peta Bala'c (born 1953), English football goalkeeper
- Peta Hiku (born 1992), New Zealand rugby league player
- Peta Nocona (1820-1864?), a chief of the Comanche band Noconi
- Peta Teanet, South African disco musician

== Fictional characters ==
- Peta Janossi, in the Australian soap opera Home and Away
- Peta (MÄR), a fictional character in the manga and anime series MÄR

== Animals ==
- Peta (cat), former resident Downing Street cat and unofficial Chief Mouser to the Cabinet Office (1964-78)

== See also ==
- Peta-Gaye Dowdie, a Jamaican international sprinter
- Peta-Gaye Gayle, Jamaican track and field sprinter
- Peta-Kaye Croft, Australian politician
