= Peta (cat) =

Chief Mouser to the Cabinet Office from 1964 to 1976

Chief Mouser to the Cabinet Office
- In role 8 May 1964 – 1976
- Monarch: Elizabeth II
- Prime Minister: Alec Douglas-Home; Harold Wilson; Edward Heath
- Preceded by: Peter III (1964)
- Succeeded by: Wilberforce (1973)

Personal details
- Born: c. October 1963 Isle of Man
- Died: 1980 (aged 16)
- Occupation: Mouser

Peta (Note: Upon her arrival in London, she was renamed Peta in honour of her predecessors: Peter, Peter II and Peter III.) (born Manninagh KateDhu, c. October 1963 – 1980) was the chief mouser to the Cabinet Office, beginning her term in 1964 and retiring around 1976. She was the replacement of Peter III, who had died at the age of 16 in 1964. A Manx cat, Peta was born on the Isle of Man. Peta served during the premierships of three prime ministers: Alec Douglas-Home, Harold Wilson and Edward Heath. She died in 1980 after having retired to the home of a civil servant.

== Early life and career ==
Manninagh KateDhu was born around October 1963 (Note: In May 1964, she was stated as being seven months old.) on a farm on the Isle of Man; according to Douglas Kerruisch, the chief veterinary officer for the Isle of Man Board of Agriculture and Fisheries, she caught "several mice" there. After Peter III was euthanised in March 1964 following a liver infection, the lieutenant governor of the Isle of Man, Ronald Garvey, suggested that a Manx cat be his replacement. (Note: Peta had previously served on the Board of Agriculture and Fisheries.) On 8 May 1964 (Note: The National Archives states that the date Peta arrived was 7 May, but contemporary newspapers report the date as being 8 May.) Garvey flew Peta over to London from the Isle of Man and "ceremonially" handed her over to the home secretary, Henry Brooke, as a gift from the island's government, along with an illuminated pedigree chart; selected photographers and reporters were allowed into the room to view the event. Once she had arrived at the Home Office, she was renamed Peta in honour of her predecessors: Peter, Peter II, and Peter III. She received a 5s per week living allowance from the Treasury as "a mouser", (Note: This was double what the previous mouser, Peter III, had received, at 2s 6d.) but was noted to be lazy, loud, and not house trained. Upon her arrival, she received fan mail from around the world, including letters from New York, Italy, and Fife.

Later that month, she was given a penicillin injection to combat "a severe chill"; on 20 May she was said to be "on the mend". By 29 May 1964 she had caught two mice. During her time off work, Peta frequented Trafalgar Square. In December 1964, Peta appeared on a Christmas card. Home Office staff were told not to feed her morsels of food, as, by February 1967, Peta had become "inordinately fat"; that same year, she was accused of fighting with Harold Wilson's Siamese cat, Nemo. When attempting to break up the fight, Mary Wilson was scratched on her arm by Nemo, contracting sepsis which caused her to miss a dinner with the Italian prime minister, Aldo Moro, being held that night.

== Retirement and death ==
By 1968 or 1969 some civil servants had attempted to remove Peta from the Home Office, but this did not happen due to the suspected bad publicity that this action would incur as Peta had gained "diplomatic status" because of her public arrival. She was not mentioned in official records again, until a reply to a member of the public in 1976 revealed that she had retired to the home of a civil servant; The National Archives records the end of her tenure as 1976. Peta's successor was Wilberforce, who had become the chief mouser in 1973. According to the National Archives, Peta died in or around the year 1980.

== See also ==
- List of individual cats
