= Peter II (cat) =

Chief Mouser to the Cabinet Office from 1946 to 1947

Chief Mouser to the Cabinet Office
- In role December 1946 – 21 June 1947
- Monarch: George VI
- Prime Minister: Clement Attlee
- Preceded by: Nelson
- Succeeded by: Peter III

Personal details
- Born: c. October 1946
- Died: 21 June 1947 (aged 7–8 months) Westminster, London, England
- Cause of death: Struck by a car
- Occupation: Mouser

Peter II (c. October 1946 – 21 June 1947) was a cat who was employed as the chief mouser to the Cabinet Office from 1946 to 1947, during the premiership of Clement Attlee. He was a two-month-old kitten when appointed to the role. Peter served just six months; in the early hours of 21 June 1947 he was struck by a car near the Cenotaph in Whitehall, and died shortly afterwards. He was succeeded by Peter III.

== Life ==
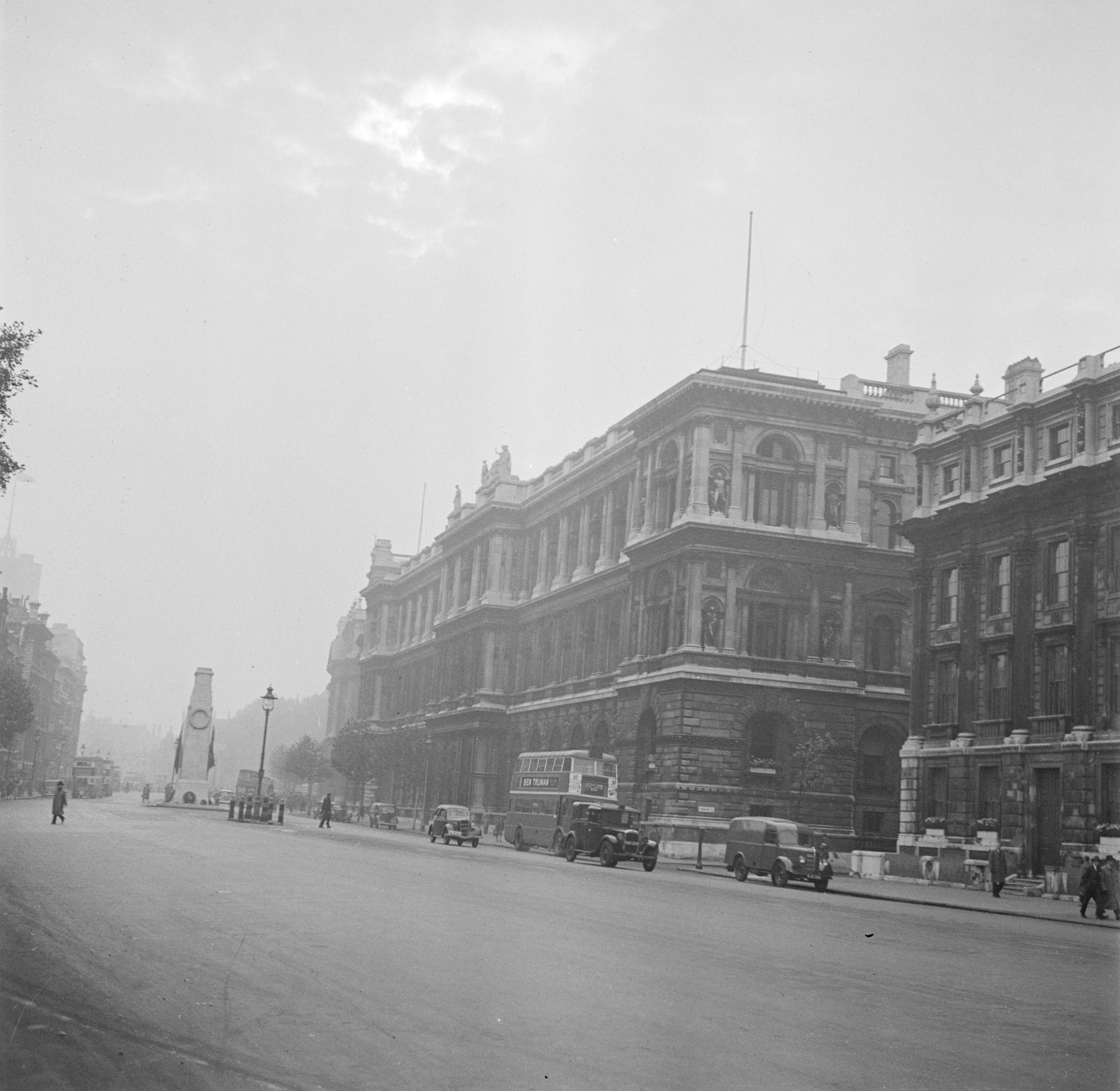
Whitehall and the Cenotaph in 1947, where Peter was struck

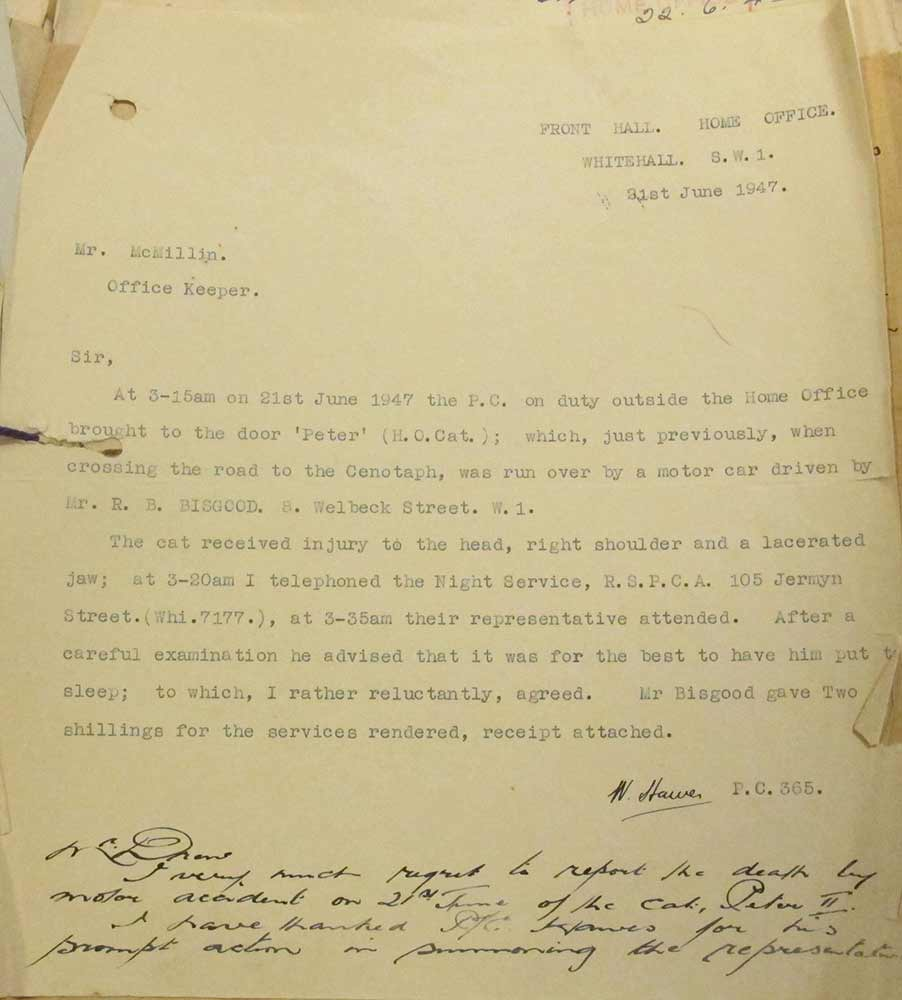
Government letter regarding Peter's death

Peter was born c. October 1946. He was appointed chief mouser to the Cabinet Office in December 1946, when he was two months old, during Clement Attlee's premiership. His appointment occurred one month after Peter was euthanised on 14 November 1946 at the age of 17 owing to his no longer being an "efficient cat" and having "outlived his usefulness".

The young kitten served a truncated term; in the early hours of 21 June 1947, around six months after his appointment, Peter was struck by a car driven by a "Mr. R. B. Bisgood" in Whitehall while walking from the Home Office to the Cenotaph, receiving "injury to the head, right shoulder and a lacerated jaw". After the collision, a police constable brought Peter to the door of the Home Office building at 3:15 am, and the Royal Society for the Prevention of Cruelty to Animals (RSPCA) was phoned five minutes later; their representative arrived on the scene at 3:35 am. Peter was "put to sleep" on the advice of the RSPCA attendant, with Bisgood paying 2s for the procedure. Speaking in 2017, Chris Day, the head of Modern Domestic Records at the National Archives, said that Peter "did not have the same illustrious career that his forebears did"; in 2022 the British magazine Tatler stated that "[h]ad he survived longer, no doubt his career would have been just as illustrious". On 27 August 1947 he was succeeded by Peter III, who would serve as chief mouser for over 16 years.

== See also ==
- List of individual cats
