= Thaanaa Serndha Koottam (soundtrack) =

Soundtrack album by Anirudh Ravichander
- Released: 6 January 2018
- Recorded: 2017–2018
- Studios: Albuquerque Records, Chennai; Knack Studios, Chennai
- Genre: Feature film soundtrack
- Length: 20:59
- Language: Tamil
- Label: Sony Music India
- Producer: Anirudh Ravichander

Anirudh Ravichander chronology
Agnyaathavaasi (2018)	Thaanaa Serndha Koottam (2018)	Kolamaavu Kokila (2018)

Singles from Thaana Serndha Koottam
- 1. "Naana Thaanaa" Released: 26 July 2017; 2. "Sodakku" Released: 26 October 2017; 3. "Peela Peela" Released: 23 December 2017; 4. "Thaanaa Serndha Koottam" Released: 30 December 2017

Thaanaa Serndha Koottam is the soundtrack to the 2018 film of the same name directed by Vignesh Shivan and produced by Studio Green starring Suriya. The film's musical score is composed by Anirudh Ravichander, whose soundtrack featured five songs with lyrics written by Vignesh, Thamarai and Mani Amudhavan. The soundtrack was released under the Sony Music India label on 6 January 2018.

== Background ==
Thaanaa Serndha Kottam is Anirudh's second collaboration with Vignesh after Naanum Rowdy Dhaan (2015) and first with Suriya and the only one till date. The film was initially set to have eight songs, however only five tunes were finalised for the film. Anirudh's described the music for the film would be "rustic" and "indigenous" like Naanum Rowdy Dhaan.

== Marketing and release ==
In July 2017, it was announced that Sony Music India had purchased the distribution rights for the film's soundtrack. The film's first single "Naana Thaanaa" sung by Anirudh himself, was released on 26 July 2017 through the music streaming platform Saavn and later uploaded to other platforms. The teaser of the second single "Sodakku" sung by Anthony Daasan was released on 16 October 2017 coinciding Anirudh's birthday, and the full song was unveiled on 26 October. An accompanying promotional video was released on the same day, that featured dance performances of the film's cast and appearances from Sheril and Aana, who rose to fame with her dance cover of the song "Entammede Jimikki Kammal" from Velipadinte Pusthakam (2017).

The third song "Peela Peela" performed by Nakash Aziz, Jassie Gift and Mali was released on 23 December. The fourth song—the film's title track—was launched on 30 December. The film's soundtrack was released on 6 January 2018 at the "Natchathira Vizha" (transl. Star-studded festival), a fundraiser event organised by the Nadigar Sangam which was held at the Bukit Jalil National Stadium in Kuala Lumpur, Malaysia. Though Anirudh was not present at the event, he performed the songs live at the film's pre-release event held in Park Hyatt, Chennai on 10 January.

== Track listing ==
=== Tamil ===
No.	Title	Lyrics	Singer(s)	Length
1.	"Naana Thaana"	Vignesh Shivan	Anirudh Ravichander	4:20
2.	"Sodakku"	Mani Amudhavan, Vignesh Shivan	Anthony Daasan	4:00
3.	"Thaanaa Serndha Koottam"	Vignesh Shivan	Anirudh Ravichander, Vignesh Shivan	4:05
4.	"Peela Peela"	Vignesh Shivan	Nakash Aziz, Jassie Gift, Mali	3:44
5.	"Engae Endru Povathu"	Thamarai	Anirudh Ravichander, Shakthisree Gopalan	4:50
Total length:				20:59

=== Telugu ===
No.	Title	Lyrics	Singer(s)	Length
1.	"Naala Nenu"	Sri Mani	L. V. Revanth	4:19
2.	"Chitike"	Krishna Kanth	Rahul Sipligunj	4:01
3.	"Gang (Title Track)"	Ramajogayya Sastry	L. V. Revanth	4:05
4.	"Ekkadikelle Daaridhi"	Rakendu Mouli	Sri Krishna, Shakthisree Gopalan	4:50
5.	"Pilla Pilla"	Sri Mani	Vedala Hemachandra, Srindhi Venkatesh	3:44
Total length:				20:58

== Reception ==
Critic based at Behindwoods rated 3.25 out of five stating that the album "shines high on variety". Richard Mahesh of Studioflicks also assigned 3.25 out of five calling it "a much valuable package of tracks based on different genres". Sharanya CR of The Times of India wrote "Anirudh and Vignesh's combination has worked again – and the composer only proves, time and again, to experiment and give some fine tracks for each album he works on". Mridula Ramadugu of Firstpost analyzed the lack of romantic songs in the film, due to its theme as the "peppy vibe counter-balancing the serious shades of the film" and felt the album is "quite a drastic makeover" from Anirudh and Shivan's previous collaborations.

Priyanka Sundar of Hindustan Times described it as a "magical album". Karthik Srinivasan of Milliblog found the film's music to be a "far cry" from the duo's work on Naanum Rowdy Dhaan, though he called "Sodakku" as the "easy winner". Regarding the song "Sodakku", Adesh Thapliyal, a critic based at Pitchfork stated that "Anirudh reinvigorates two tired sounds—the parai drum pattern and the synth wub—making it feel as if you were listening to a big meaty drop for the first time again."

== Controversy ==
The song "Sodakku" attracted controversy after an AIADMK office bearer, Sathish Kumar, lodged a complaint with the Commissioner of Police seeking changes in the lyrics, which he claimed were offensive and anti-political. Kumar's statements were widely criticized by those in the film industry, with RJ Balaji speaking out against the complaint. He filed a public litigation at the Madras High Court regarding the same, which had instructed him to share the English translations of the song by February 2018 to validate his claims.

== Accolades ==
Award (Note: Awards, festivals and organisations are in alphabetical order.)	Date of ceremony (Note: Date is linked to the article about the awards held that year, wherever possible.)	Category	Recipient(s) and nominee(s)	Result	Ref.
Ananda Vikatan Cinema Awards	5 January 2019	Best Playback Singer – Male	Anthony Daasan – ("Sodakku")	Won	
Edison Awards	17 February 2019	Best Music Director	Anirudh Ravichander	Nominated	
Edison Awards	17 February 2019	Best Playback Singer – Male	Anthony Daasan – ("Sodakku")	Nominated	
Filmfare Awards South	21 December 2019	Best Lyricist – Tamil	Vignesh Shivan – ("Sodakku")	Won	
Filmfare Awards South	21 December 2019	Best Male Playback Singer – Tamil	Anthony Daasan – ("Sodakku")	Won	
South Indian International Movie Awards	15–16 August 2019	Best Lyricist – Tamil	Vignesh Shivan – ("Naana Thaana")	Nominated	
South Indian International Movie Awards	15–16 August 2019	Best Male Playback Singer – Tamil	Anthony Daasan – ("Sodakku")	Nominated	
