= Pitta (disambiguation) =

The Pitta is a family of tropical birds.

Pitta may also refer to

- Pitta (genus), a genus within the bird family
- Pitta (surname)
- Pitta (album), an album by Baek Ji-young
- Pitta bread or pita bread
- Pitta (island), an island of Greece
- Pitta (dosha), one of the three doshas in Ayurveda
- Kang Hyung-ho, a South Korean singer known by the stage name Pitta

== See also ==
- Pita (disambiguation)
- Pitta Pitta language, an extinct Australian Aboriginal language
