= Nelson (cat) =

Chief Mouser to the Cabinet Office in the 1940s

- Cartoon of Nelson from Edwin Cox's Private Lives comic, 1941 (Note: No photographs of Nelson are known to exist.)

Chief Mouser to the Cabinet Office
- In role c. July 1940 – c. May 1944 Serving with the Munich Mouser (1940–1943)
- Monarch: George VI
- Prime Minister: Winston Churchill; Clement Attlee
- Preceded by: Munich Mouser
- Succeeded by: Peter II

Personal details
- Occupation: Mouser

Nelson (fl. May 1940 – May 1944) was a cat who served as the chief mouser to the Cabinet Office during the wartime coalition government as a pet of Winston Churchill. In the summer of 1940, after Churchill became the prime minister, Nelson moved from Admiralty House to 10 Downing Street, where he had a rivalry with his predecessor: Neville Chamberlain's cat, the Munich Mouser.

== Life and career ==
Nelson is the bravest cat I ever knew ... I decided to adopt him and name him after our great Admiral.

— Winston Churchill

Winston Churchill decided to adopt Nelson, a black stray, when he witnessed him chasing off a "huge dog" from Admiralty House, London. Impressed by his bravery, Churchill named the cat after the British admiral Horatio Nelson, 1st Viscount Nelson. Following Churchill's appointment as prime minister in 1940, Nelson moved into 10 Downing Street from Admiralty House sometime during the summer. Opponents of Churchill speculated that he would not bring Nelson to Downing Street, suggesting that Churchill did not like cats; this was refuted by Churchill's friends as a "gross aspersion". Commenters also wondered whether Nelson and the previous prime minister Neville Chamberlain's cat, nicknamed the Munich Mouser, would get along:

How, it is asked, will the "Munich" cat react to "Nelson"? Will it follow Mr. Chamberlain next door to his new home at No. 11, leaving the field at No. 10 to "Nelson"? Or will it refuse to abdicate and call for a showdown in his majesty's court of justice?

The cats did not take a liking to one another, with the rivalry between the pair later compared with that of the 21st-century mousers Larry and Palmerston. Churchill would reportedly regularly entertain guests with stories of Nelson's bravery.

During the Christmas season of 1941 the United States gifted Churchill a large number of items, including catnip for Nelson. In February 1942 Quentin Reynolds, an American journalist, reported that Nelson had demonstrated his "faithfulness" to Churchill by jumping into his lap when called; Churchill's daughter Mary claimed that "Nelson isn't really that faithful", and "he [was] only being nice" to Churchill because they were to have salmon for lunch. Reynolds also described a dinner with the Churchills and Nelson in a book published that year, at which Churchill recited parts of Shakespeare's Hamlet. On 2 May 1944, at the Commonwealth Prime Ministers' Conference, Nelson was trapped in a fridge whilst attempting to get "an extra helping of milk", but was soon released unharmed. During meetings with Churchill's war cabinet, Nelson would sit close to Churchill, acting as a "prime ministerial hot water bottle"; the prime minister was reported to have mentioned this fact to Rab Butler, stating that through his acts Nelson "save[d] fuel and power", and thereby aided the war effort.

== See also ==
- List of individual cats
- Winston Churchill's pets
