= Kolamaavu Kokila (soundtrack) =

Soundtrack album by Anirudh Ravichander
- Released: 17 May 2018
- Recorded: 2017–2018
- Genre: Feature film soundtrack
- Length: 21:10
- Language: Tamil
- Label: Zee Music Company
- Producer: Anirudh Ravichander

Anirudh Ravichander chronology
Thaanaa Serndha Koottam (2018)	Kolamaavu Kokila (2018)	Petta (2019)

Singles from Kolamaavu Kokila
- 1. "Edhuvaraiyo" Released: 8 March 2018; 2. "Kalyana Vayasu" Released: 15 May 2018; 3. "Orey Oru" Released: 13 June 2018

Kolamaavu Kokila is the soundtrack to the 2018 Tamil-language black comedy film of the same name directed by debutant Nelson Dilipkumar and produced by Lyca Productions, starring Nayanthara. The film's musical score is composed by Anirudh Ravichander whose soundtrack consisted of six songs written by Vivek, Vignesh Shivan, Arunraja Kamaraj and Sivakarthikeyan. After the release of three singles—"Edhuvaraiyo", "Kalyana Vayasu", "Orey Oru"—the soundtrack in its entirety released through Zee Music Company on 1 July 2018.

== Background ==
Kolamaavu Kokila marked the maiden collaboration between Anirudh and Nelson Dilipkumar. Nelson who directed Anirudh's concert tours, narrated the core idea of the script to the latter, which he found "interesting" and agreed to be a part of the film. The soundtrack featured six songs: "Edhuvaraiyo", "Kalyana Vayasu", "Orey Oru", "Kabiskabaa Coco – The Gibberish Song", "Thittam Poda Theriyala" and "Gun-In Kadhal".

"Edhuvaraiyo" is a motivational number, penned by Vivek and sung by Sean Roldan, with the voice-over of Gautham Vasudev Menon. "Kalyana Vayasu" marked the debut of actor Sivakarthikeyan as a lyricist. The song is picturised on Yogi Babu and Nayanthara, with Babu describing her as his "suitable bride" as he falls in love with her. Nelson, who worked with Sivakarthikeyan in Star Vijay, found him to be apt to write the song due to its situation and comic nature. While describing the song as Nelson's brainchild, the "trendy" lyrics were from Sivakarthikeyan's imagination.

We can't approach him [Sivakarthikeyan] for a "Narumugaye" (from Iruvar) type of classical song. We were looking for someone new and thought he would be apt to write the lyrics [...] There aren't many lyricists in the category that we needed for this song. We convinced him and he pulled it off with ease.

— Nelson, regarding Sivakarthikeyan's inclusion for writing the song "Kalyana Vayasu".

"Orey Oru" is written by Vignesh Shivan in his 30th song as a lyricist and featured the vocals of Anirudh and Jonita Gandhi; they collaborated for the second time having previously sung "Iraiva" for Velaikkaran (2017). "Kabiskabaa Coco – The Gibberish Song" was written and performed by Arunraja Kamaraj, whose lyrics contained gibberish words as described in the title. "Thittam Poda Theriyala" is a montage number, while "Gun In Kadhal" was not featured in the film.

== Release and marketing ==
The six-song soundtrack was released to digital platforms on 1 July 2018. It was preceded by three singles: "Edhuvaraiyo" was the first song from the album, released on International Women's Day (8 March 2018). "Kalyana Vayasu" was the second to be released on 15 May 2018, followed by the third song "Orey Oru" on 13 June.

Since most of the songs are used montages in the film, promotional music videos were also released along with each individual track. The music video for the song "Kalyana Vayasu" released along with the single, which is also a part of the film as well. The video for "Orey Oru" featuring Anirudh, Gandhi and guitarist Keba Jeremiah performing the song at a cafe was released on the same day as the single. Post the album's release, the music video for "Kabiskabaa Coco – The Gibberish Song" was unveiled on 16 July 2018. Besides Redin Kingsley, Anbu Thasan and Theepetti Ganesan, who also appeared in the film, the video also featured appearances from internet personality Bijili Ramesh and actor Lollu Sabha Manohar.

The promo video for the song "Thittam Poda Theriyala" featuring Anirudh was released on 4 August 2018; the video was directed by the song's lyricist Vignesh Shivan and filmed by Manoj Paramahamsa. The video for the final song "Gun In Kadhal" featuring Nayanthara and Nelson, was released on 18 August 2018 (after the film).

== Track listing ==
No.	Title	Lyrics	Singer(s)	Length
1.	"Edhuvaraiyo"	Vivek	Sean Roldan, Gautham Vasudev Menon	4:12
2.	"Kalyana Vayasu"	Sivakarthikeyan	Anirudh Ravichander	3:54
3.	"Orey Oru"	Vignesh Shivan	Anirudh Ravichander, Jonita Gandhi	3:19
4.	"Kabiskabaa Coco – The Gibberish Song"	Arunraja Kamaraj	Arunraja Kamaraj	2:19
5.	"Thittam Poda Theriyala"	Vignesh Shivan	Anirudh Ravichander	4:27
6.	"Gun-In Kadhal"	Vignesh Shivan	Vijay Yesudas, Arunraja Kamaraj	2:59
Total length:				21:10

== Reception ==
Thinkal Menon of The Times of India reviewed the album as a "pleasant one" albeit being reminiscent of Anirudh's previous works. Ashameera Aiyyappan of The Indian Express also highlighted the familiarity of the songs "Edhuvarayo" and "Orey Oru" to his earlier compositions, but found the song "Kabiskabaa Coco – The Gibberish Song" to be "fun" and "trippy". Critic based at Scroll.in admitted that the song's mood reflected the film's premise.

Karthik Srinivasan of Milliblog called it as "one of Anirudh's best" further praising him for "producing massively entertaining music". According to Vikram Venkateswaran of The Quint, "the music plays muse, buddy and bridge to the scene. It plays the role of sound effects which cue the viewer on when to laugh or cry and sets the tone of the scene." Sreedhar Pillai of Firstpost attributed that Anirudh's music "fits into the plot".

== Accolades ==
Award	Date of ceremony	Category	Recipient(s) and nominee(s)	Result	Ref.
South Indian International Movie Awards	15 August 2019	Best Music Director – Tamil	Anirudh Ravichander	Won	
South Indian International Movie Awards	15 August 2019	Best Male Playback Singer – Tamil	Anirudh Ravichander – ("Kalyana Vayasu")	Nominated	
Filmfare Awards South	21 December 2019	Best Music Director	Anirudh Ravichander	Nominated	
Filmfare Awards South	21 December 2019	Best Male Playback Singer – Tamil	Anirudh Ravichander – ("Kalyana Vayasu")	Nominated	

== Controversy ==
Post the release of "Kalyana Vayasu", Anirudh was accused of plagiarizing the tunes from Sannan's "Don't Lie" and Chibz's "Feeling Me" for sampling the song. Responding to those allegations, he claimed that he had licensed those tunes from Beatsbymantra as he used to work with numerous music producers worldwide. In late-December 2018, the song was removed from YouTube and other digital platforms citing copyright issues, and was replaced with another version sung by Abhay Jodhpurkar with Anirudh's name removed from the music credits and his name listed as a hashtag only.
