= Jack Whitlock =

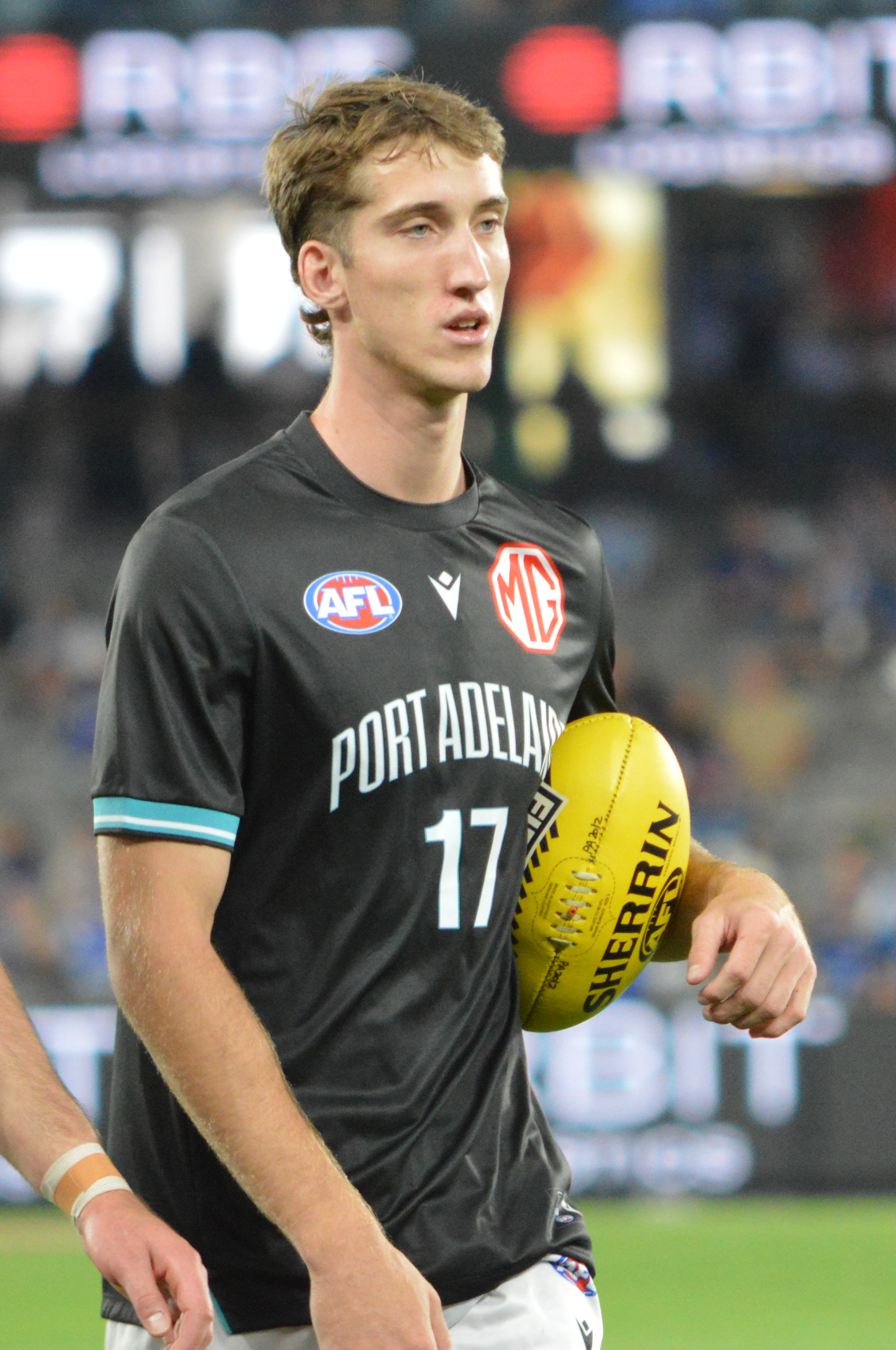
- Whitlock in March 2026

Personal information
- Born: 16 May 2006 (age 20)
- Original team: Shepparton/Murray Bushrangers
- Draft: No. 33, 2024 AFL draft
- Debut: Round 21, 2025, Port Adelaide vs. Geelong, at Kardinia Park
- Height: 200 cm (6 ft 7 in)
- Position: Key Forward

Club information
- Current club: Port Adelaide
- Number: 17

Playing career^{1}
Years	Club	Games (Goals)
2025–	Port Adelaide	25 (26)
- ^{1} Playing statistics correct to the end of round 22, 2026.

Career highlights
- AFL Rising Star nominee: 2026

Jack Whitlock (born 16 May 2006) is an Australian rules footballer who plays for the Port Adelaide Football Club in the Australian Football League (AFL).

== Early life ==
Whitlock grew up in Shepparton, Victoria. He attended school at Goulburn Valley Grammar School.

== Junior Career ==
Whitlock played junior football with the Shepparton Football Club in the Goulburn Valley Football League. He played representative football for the Murray Bushrangers in the Talent League. At the age of sixteen, in his second game for the Bushrangers, Whitlock suffered a lacerated spleen, kidney and broken ribs.

On return in 2023, Whitlock averaged 9.8 disposals and 0.8 goals a game. In 2024, he improved to average 16.4 disposals and 2.1 goals a game. He was named in the Talent League Team of the Year for 2024.

Whitlock also represented Vic Country in the Under 18 Championships. He averaged 14.8 disposals and a goal a game.

== AFL career ==
Whitlock was selected with pick 33 of the 2024 AFL draft by Port Adelaide. He made his debut in round 21 of the 2025 AFL season.

In round 8 of the 2026 AFL season, Whitlock had 14 disposals and kicked a goal to win a nomination for the 2026 AFL Rising Star award.

== Personal life ==
Whitlock's twin brother, Matt, is an Australian rules footballer with the North Melbourne Football Club.

== Statistics ==
Updated to the end of round 22, 2026.

Legend
G	Goals	K	Kicks	D	Disposals	T	Tackles
B	Behinds	H	Handballs	M	Marks

Season	Team	No.	Games	Totals							Averages (per game)							Votes
Season	Team	No.	Games	G	B	K	H	D	M	T	G	B	K	H	D	M	T	Votes
2025	Port Adelaide	17	4	4	2	14	12	26	10	13	1.0	0.5	3.5	3.0	6.5	2.5	3.3	0
2026	Port Adelaide	17	21	22	23	112	67	179	79	20	1.0	1.1	5.3	3.2	8.5	3.8	1.0	0
Career			25	26	25	126	79	205	89	33	1.0	1.0	5.0	3.2	8.2	3.6	1.3	0
