= Matt Whitlock =

Personal information
- Born: 16 May 2006 (age 20)
- Original team: Shepparton/Murray Bushrangers
- Draft: No. 27, 2024 AFL draft
- Debut: Round 4, 2025, North Melbourne vs. Sydney, at Marvel Stadium
- Height: 197 cm (6 ft 6 in)
- Position: Key Defender

Club information
- Current club: North Melbourne
- Number: 35

Playing career^{1}
Years	Club	Games (Goals)
2025–	North Melbourne	5 (3)
- ^{1} Playing statistics correct to the end of round 22, 2026.

Matt Whitlock (born 16 May 2006) is an Australian rules footballer who plays for the North Melbourne Football Club in the Australian Football League (AFL).

== Early life ==
Whitlock grew up in Shepparton, Victoria. He went to school at Goulburn Valley Grammar School.

== Junior Career ==
Whitlock played junior football with the Shepparton Football Club in the Goulburn Valley Football League. He also played for the Murray Bushrangers in the Talent League, averaging 14.2 disposals and 1.2 goals a game in 2024. He was named as the fullback in the 2024 Talent League Team of the Year.

Whitlock also represented Vic Country in the Under 18 Championships. He averaged 14 disposals and 0.5 goals a game.

== AFL career ==
Whitlock was selected by North Melbourne with pick 27 of the 2024 AFL draft. He made his debut in round four of the 2025 AFL season.

== Personal life ==
Whitlock's twin brother, Jack, is an Australian rules footballer with the Port Adelaide Football Club.

== Statistics ==
Updated to the end of round 22, 2026.

Legend
G	Goals	K	Kicks	D	Disposals	T	Tackles
B	Behinds	H	Handballs	M	Marks

Season	Team	No.	Games	Totals							Averages (per game)							Votes
Season	Team	No.	Games	G	B	K	H	D	M	T	G	B	K	H	D	M	T	Votes
2025	North Melbourne	35	2	1	0	7	5	12	3	1	0.5	0.0	3.5	2.5	6.0	1.5	0.5	0
2026	North Melbourne	35	3	2	2	12	7	19	9	1	0.7	0.7	4.0	2.3	6.3	3.0	0.3	0
Career			5	3	2	19	12	31	12	2	0.6	0.4	3.8	2.4	6.2	2.4	0.4	0
