= Rufus of England =

Chief Mouser to the Cabinet Office in 1924

Rufus of England Treasury Bill
- Treasury Bill and Treasury office-keeper G. H. Newnham, c. 1930

1st Chief Mouser to the Cabinet Office
- In office 22 January 1924 – 4 November 1924
- In office 5 June 1929 – c. 1930 Serving with Peter (1929—c. 1930)
- Monarch: George V
- Prime Minister: Ramsay MacDonald
- Succeeded by: Peter

Personal details
- Born: c. 1920s
- Occupation: Mouser
- Gender: Male

Rufus of England, popularly nicknamed Treasury Bill, was a cat who served as Chief Mouser to the Cabinet Office of the United Kingdom under prime minister Ramsay MacDonald. The exact length of his residency at the treasury is unclear.

== Life and career ==
In June 1928, the Weekly Dispatch published an article announcing the appointment of "Rufus Rex" as the new mouse-catcher at the Treasury. His predecessor was known simply as the Old Cat and died after eating "a bad mouse". Rufus was a purebred ginger Persian, described by C. Patrick Thompson in The Graphic as being a "large sandy cat". He was said to have been "only a kitten at Christmas" in June 1928. The Western Mail, however, referred to him as being "the official cat of six years' standing" in December 1930.

According to the Weekly Dispatch, Rufus had frustrated his previous owner due to his habit of catching and killing birds. Being familiar with leading Treasury civil servant Warren Fisher and aware of the Old Cat's death, she took the cat to the Treasury where he was given the name "Rufus Rex" and a salary of 2d (2 pence) per day. In 1930, his wages increased to 3d (three pence) per day after a brief campaign from leading civil servant Maude Lawrence.

In 1932, the News Chronicle published a poem criticising Rufus's pay rise:

What's the cheer?
Rufus the cat has got a rise,
Three pence a day until he dies;
Bone-us, too, on the top of that—
But what about me—Dinah the cat?

The Weekly Dispatch described him as a "pleasant cat to meet", but he was also described as having an aloof personality and being an "unfriendly sort of cat".
