= Sarwar Khan =

Indian folk singer

- Born: 2004–2005; Dangri, Jaisalmer, Rajasthan, India
- Occupation: Singer
- Awards: Mirchi Music Award for Male Vocalist of The Year

Sarwar Khan is an Indian singer from Dangri, Jaisalmer, Rajasthan. He gained fame and recognition after singing the popular song "Haanikaarak Bapu" in the 2016 film Dangal at the age of 12. Sarwar began his tutelage at the age of 3 and participated in various stage performances during his childhood.

Sarwar has also sung the title song for the cartoon Gattu Battu and recorded an ad film song for Borosil bottle. Sarwar Khan won the Mirchi Music Award for Male Vocalist of The Year and was felicitated at a program held in Kalakar Bhawan.

== Film Songs ==
Year	Movie	Song	Singer(s)/co-singer(s)	Composer(s)	Language	Label	Ref.
2022	KGF: Chapter 2	"Sulthan"	Brijesh Shandilya, Mohan Krishna, Laxman Datta Naik, Saaj Bhatt, Santhosh Venky, Sandesh Datta Naik, Sachin Basrur, Ravi Basrur, Puneeth Rudranag, Manish Dinakar, Sarwar Khan, Priyanka Bharali		Hindi	Lahari Music	
2019	Petta	"Thappad Maara"	Sarwar Khan, Sartaz Khan Barna	Anirudh Ravichander	Hindi	Sony Music India	
2016	Dangal	"Haanikaarak Bapu"	Sarwar Khan, Sartaz Khan Barna	Pritam	Hindi	Zee Music Company	

== Discography ==
Year	Song	Language	Label	Album	Ref.
2012	"Maharo Man Nachan Lage Hai"	Rajasthani	T-Series (company)		
