= Pita (disambiguation) =

Pita is a bread.

Pita or PITA may also refer to:

== Places ==
- Pita, Guinea
- Pitas, Malaysia

== People ==
- Pita (name), list of people with the name
- Peter Rehberg, a musician also known as Pita

== Other uses ==
- Pita, a type of pastry in Greek and Balkan cuisine similar to burek
- Pita, fibers from a century plant
- Pita (1991 film), a Hindi film
- Pita (2012 film), a Bangladeshi film
- Prevention of Immoral Trafficking Act, legislation in India
- Provincial Institute of Technology and Art, Alberta, Canada
- Cyclone Pita, a South Pacific tropical cyclone in 2025.

== See also ==
- Peta (disambiguation)
- Pihta, a type of sacramental bread used in Mandaean rituals
- Pitha, a type of rice cake
- Pitta (disambiguation)
- Pitha, a 2011 Indian film
