= Pitta (surname) =

Pitta is a surname. Notable people with the name include:

- Alexis Pittas (born 1979), Cypriot footballer
- Celso Pitta (1946–2009), Brazilian politician
- Dennis Pitta (born 1985), American professional football player
- Dimitris Pittas (born 1958), Greek footballer
- Eduardo Pitta (born 1949), Portuguese poet, fiction writer and essayist
- Gabriel Pitta (born 1980), Brazilian tennis player
- Ioannis Pittas (born 1996), Cypriot footballer
- Isidro Pitta (born 1999), Paraguayan footballer
- Pambos Pittas (born 1966), Cypriot footballer

== See also ==
- Pita (name), surname and given name
