= Agnyaathavaasi =

2018 film by Trivikram Srinivas

- Theatrical release poster
- Directed by: Trivikram Srinivas
- Written by: Trivikram Srinivas
- Produced by: S. Radha Krishna
- Starring: Pawan Kalyan; Aadhi Pinisetty; Keerthy Suresh; Anu Emmanuel
- Cinematography: V. Manikandan
- Edited by: Kotagiri Venkateswara Rao
- Music by: Anirudh Ravichander
- Production company: Haarika & Hassine Creations
- Release date: 10 January 2018
- Running time: 158 minutes
- Country: India
- Language: Telugu
- Budget: ₹90 crore
- Box office: est. ₹95 crores

Agnyaathavaasi (lit. 'A man in exile') is a 2018 Indian Telugu-language action comedy film written and directed by Trivikram Srinivas. Produced by S. Radha Krishna, the film stars Pawan Kalyan, Aadhi Pinisetty, Keerthy Suresh and Anu Emmanuel. The music was composed by Anirudh Ravichander, marking his debut in Telugu cinema, with cinematography by Manikandan.

The film was released on 10 January 2018, coinciding with the Sankranti festival. Upon release, it received highly negative reviews from critics and audiences, with criticism directed at the direction, screenplay, and pacing, while the music and cinematography received appreciation. The film also sparked controversy for being an alleged copy of the French film, Largo Winch. The film was a disaster at the box office, only recovering roughly half of its investment of ₹125 cr theatrical rights with earnings of roughly ₹60 crore share , and resulting in negative returns for all distributors.

== Plot ==
Govinda "Vindha" Bhargav, a powerful businessman, receives news of his younger son Mohan Bhargav's death in a car accident while in Italy. Soon after, assassins enter his hotel room, and one of them holds up a phone. On the other end, Vindha's friends Sarma and Varma reveal that they orchestrated his son's death and plan to take over his empire. Vindha secretly records this conversation before being killed by the gunmen.

The news of Vindha's death reaches his second wife, Indrani Bhargav, who discovers the audio file of Vindha's alleged killers. She contacts Appaji, the brother of Vindha's deceased first wife Krishnaveni, to summon an unknown person. Appaji informs the unknown person, who is revealed to be Abhishikth Bhargav, Vindha's eldest son. After performing his father's last rites in Varanasi, Abhi travels from Assam to Hyderabad, where his father's possible killers live. He gets a job in his father's company under the pseudonym Balasubramanyam and befriends Sukumari, Varma's daughter, and Suryakantham, Sarma's secretary. Abhi discovers that the recorded phone conversation was faked, as there are no international calls registered on Sarma and Varma's phones. Meanwhile, unknown assailants attempt to kill Abhi, but he kills them in self-defense. The last attacker reveals that the true mastermind is Seetharam, the son of Vindha's former business partner, Aditya Bandaru. ACP Sampath, leading the police investigation, delves into Vindha's past.

Past: Vindha, originally a middle-class man, built a successful pharmaceutical company and planned to set up a factory in a remote village. However, Vindha refused to bribe a local politician, who incited villagers to attack Vindha's factory with help from Vindha's friend Aditya Bandaru. During their escape on a charter plane, Vindha's medicine vial is destroyed, but Vindha secretly keeps a second vial. Vindha begins to suspect his friends after observing their behaviour. While on a holiday in Bali with his pregnant first wife Krishnaveni, there is an attempt on her life. She is presumed dead, but it is revealed that another woman wearing the same robe was mistakenly killed. Vindha sends Krishnaveni to her brother Appaji's house for safety, but she dies shortly after giving birth to Abhi. Vindha raises Abhi to be indifferent to wealth, considering it a necessary trait to lead his empire. With Abhi's consent, Vindha marries Indrani, who becomes Mohan's mother.

Present: Abhi takes over the company, revealing his true identity as Vindha's son. He tortures Sarma, Varma, and Koteswara Rao, who harass women in the workplace. Seetharam, upon learning of Abhi, returns to India and demands proof of Abhi's lineage. Abhi travels to Bulgaria with Sukumari and Suryakantham to retrieve Vindha's will, which names Abhi as the heir. However, Seetharam, with Appaji's help, steals and destroys the will, eliminating the evidence. During the election for the future CEO, Abhi battles Seetharam's goons on the company rooftop. He reveals that the will Seetharam destroyed was fake and that Appaji was part of Abhi's plan. After defeating most of Seetharam's goons, a board member reveals himself as Aditya's brother and admits to being part of Vindha's murder to avenge his brother. Abhi confronts him, and the board member and Seetharam's henchman Parag fall from the rooftop, resulting in their deaths. Abhi reveals to Seetharam that the company "AB group" was named after Aditya Bandaru, not himself. He then assumes the position of CEO and assures Indrani he will fulfill his father's duties. In the end, Abhi ensures that Seetharam is exiled to an isolated island.

== Cast ==
- Pawan Kalyan as Abhishikth Bhargav, Vindha's eldest son who disguises himself as Balasubramanyam and the main protagonist
- Aadhi Pinisetty as Seetharam, Aditya Bandaru's son who wishes to take Vindha's company and the main antagonist
- Jayaprakash as Daya Bandaru, Aditya's brother
- Boman Irani as Govinda Bhargav aka Vindha, Abhi and Mohan's father
- Ajay as Aditya Bandaru, Vindha's friend
- Keerthy Suresh as Sukumari, Varma's daughter
- Anu Emmanuel as Suryakantham, Sharma's secretary
- Khushbu as Indrani Bhargav, Abhi's stepmother, Vindha's second wife, Mohan's mother
- Rao Ramesh as Varma, Sukumari’s father & Vindha's friend
- Murali Sharma as Sarma, Vindha's friend
- Sampath Raj as Detective Sampath, the Police officer investigating the murder of Vindha
- Indraja as Krishnaveni Bhargav, Abhi's mother, Vindha's first wife
- Pavitra Lokesh as Kumari, Sukumari's mother, Varma's wife
- Tanikella Bharani as Appaji, Abhi's uncle
- Parag Tyagi as Parag, Security In-Charge Officer
- Sameer Hasan as Deenabandhu, Vindha's ex-business partner
- Vennela Kishore as Bala Subramanyam, a dim-witted man whose identity is used by Abhi to enter his company
- Chaitanya Krishna as Rohit, Suryakantham's ex-boyfriend
- Raja Chembolu as Sukumari's friend kidnapped by Abhi's team
- Rajeev Kanakala as Vindha's Partner
- Raghu Babu as Koteswara Rao, a corrupt and flirtatious manager in Vindha's company who gets beaten with a belt in Kodaka Koteswara Rao song
- Aadukalam Naren as MLA
- Srinivasa Reddy as Abhi's assistant
- Narra Srinu as Abhi's assistant
- Abhishek Maharshi as Abhi's assistant
- Avantika Vandanapu as Sampath's daughter
- Adithya as Seetharam's henchman
- Kota Srinivasa Rao As Neighbour of Vindha
- Srikanth Iyyengar as Sampath's assistant
- Appaji Ambarisha Darbha as Writer
- Vamsee Aloor as Mohan Bhargav
- Fish Venkat
- Lahari Shari as Sushmita
- Venkatesh as Guru (cameo)

== Production ==
Principal photography began on 3 April 2017 with a small coffee shop scene, shot at Ciclo Cafe, then moved to a special set erected in Ramoji Film City for an action sequence. Some parts of the film were shot in Annapurna Studios and a major sequence and a song were shot in Bangkok. The unit moved to Bulgaria on 26 October 2017 for 15 days to shoot two songs. After the foreign schedule, shooting continued in Hyderabad and was completed by the end of November 2017, including a brief period of shooting at Varanasi.

After the film, Kalyan actively began his political campaign for the 2019 Andhra Pradesh election.

== Music ==
The soundtrack was composed by Anirudh Ravichander, making his Telugu debut. The first song, "Baitikochi Chusthe", was unveiled on 1 January 2018, the birthday of director Trivikram Srinivas.

Agnyaathavaasi

Soundtrack album by Anirudh Ravichander
- Released: 1 January 2018
- Length: 23:35
- Language: Telugu
- Label: Aditya Music
- Producer: Anirudh Ravichander

Anirudh Ravichander chronology
Velaikkaran (2017)	Agnyaathavaasi (2018)	Thaanaa Serndha Koottam (2018)

No.	Title	Lyrics	Singer(s)	Length
1.	"Baitikochi Chuste"	Sri Mani	Anirudh Ravichander	3:26
2.	"Gaali Vaaluga"	Sirivennela Seetharama Sastry	Anirudh Ravichander	4:18
3.	"Dhaga Dhagamaney"	Sri Mani	Anirudh Ravichander	4:16
4.	"Swagatham Krishna"	Oothukkadu Sri Venkata Subbaiyer Kriti	Padmalatha, Niranjana Ramanan	3:23
5.	"AB Yevaro Nee Baby"	Sri Mani	Nakash Aziz, Arjun Chandy	4:19
6.	"Kodakaa Koteswar Rao"	Bhaskarabhatla	Pawan Kalyan	3:53
Total length:				23:35

== Release ==
The film was released on 10 January 2018. It was then later released on Sun NXT for digital streaming, and the satellite rights are owned by Gemini TV. It was later dubbed and released in Hindi as Yevadu 3 on YouTube and aired on Sony Max by Goldmines Telefilms on 20 December 2018. It was also dubbed in Malayalam as Yuvarajavu which was aired on Surya TV & in Tamil as Maraivaasi which was aired on Sun TV.

== Reception ==
=== Critical reception ===
On the review aggregator website Rotten Tomatoes, 17% of 6 critics' reviews are positive, with an average rating of 4.5/10.

Times of India critic Neeshita Nayapati gave the film 2.5/5 stars, noting, "Despite all the pomp and show, Agnyaathavaasi, has been an amazing ride had it either been taken seriously or been made with the same old Trivikram-Pawan Kalyan touch. Pawan Kalyan aces through his role as usual. In his review for The Indian Express, Manoj Kumar R stated, "It is strictly for fans of Power Star as Trivikram has spent the entire runtime gushing over Pawan Kalyan." Sangeetha Devi Dundoo of The Hindu wrote: "The film is beautifully shot (cinematography by Manikandan) and Anirudh Ravichander comes up with refreshing music that gives a classy sheen to this urban masala film. But these aren't enough to salvage the film.

Writing for Variety, Joe Layden described the film as "a ferociously eager-to-please musical melodrama about ruthless ambition, violent revenge, and exuberantly schmaltzy music-video-style production numbers."

=== Box office ===
The film grossed ₹60.5 crore (equivalent to ₹88 crore or US$9.4 million in 2026) on its opening day and recorded one of the biggest ever openers for not just a Telugu film, but a South Indian film as a whole. Despite the opening, the film suffered heavy drops post its opening day, with empty footfalls appearing within its opening weekend. Despite attempts to revive the cinema, which included posting a cameo of Venkatesh in the film, it ultimately never recovered and only went to gross over roughly ₹60 crore. While the budget was only around ₹70 crore, the film's pre-release theatrical business was sold for roughly ₹125 crore, the second highest ever for an Indian film, and it ultimately ended its run with a distributor's share of less than ₹60 crore, meaning it wasn't even able to recover half its target.

== Plagiarism allegations ==
French director Jérôme Salle alleged that the film was plagiarised from his 2008 film Largo Winch. Following this, T-Series, which owns the remake rights of Largo Winch, sent a legal notice to the makers of the film, asking for the censored copy of the film. It was later reported that T-Series was demanding ₹15 crore (equivalent to ₹22 crore or US$2.3 million in 2026) from the makers of Agnyaathavaasi for allegedly violating copyright. The agreement between Agnyaathavaasi makers and T-Series management was amicably closed after the makers agreed to compensate them after taking into consideration that though the director had not taken the entire plotline of Largo Winch, he had written a few key scenes of Agnyaathavaasi based on scenes from the French film.

== See also ==
- Saaho, 2019 Indian film, also alleged to be a remake of Largo Winch
