= Pita (name) =

Pita is a surname and a masculine given name. In the Māori language, it is a transliteration of the name Peter. Notable people with the name include:

== Surname ==
- Afelee F. Pita (born 1958), Tuvaluan diplomat
- Alonso Pita da Veiga (1485–1490), Spanish nobleman and military officer
- Ana Inés Jabares-Pita (born 1987), Spanish stage designer
- Carlos Pita (footballer) (born 1984), Spanish football player
- Carlos Pita (politician) (born 1951), Uruguayan physician, politician and diplomat
- Cristian Pita (born 1995), Ecuadorian cyclist
- Dan Pița (born 1938), Romanian film director
- Dino Pita (born 1988), Swedish basketball player
- Elisala Pita (died 2016), Tuvaluan politician
- Félix Pita Rodríguez (1909–1990), Cuban journalist and poet
- Gabriel Pita da Veiga (1909–1993), Spanish admiral
- Hortensia Blanch Pita (1914–2004), Cuban writer
- Igor Pita (born 1989), Portuguese football player
- Juana Rosa Pita, poet, writer, editor and translator
- Juliette Pita (born 1964), American politician
- Le Tagaloa Pita, Samoan politician
- María Pita (1565–1643), heroine of the defense of A Coruña during the 1589 Siege of Coruña by the English Armada
- Maruxa Pita (1930–2025), Spanish missionary and teacher
- Marwin Pita (born 1985), Ecuadorian football player
- Paulo Pita (born 1994), Brazilian football player

== Given name ==
- Pita Ahki (born 1992), New Zealand rugby player
- Pita Alatini (born 1976), Tongan-born New Zealand rugby player
- Pita Bolatoga (born 1984), Fijian football player
- Pita Driti, Fijian soldier
- Pita Elisara (1976–2018), Samoan American football player
- Pita Godinet (born 1987), Samoa rugby player
- Pita Limjaroenrat (born 1980), Thai businessman and politician
- Pita Lus (1935–2021), Papua New Guinean politician
- Pita Maile (born 1990), Tongan rugby player
- Haimona Pita Matangi (c. 1780–1839), New Zealand tribal leader
- Pita Moko (1885–1943), New Zealand land agent
- Pita Nacuva, Fijian politician
- Pita Naruma (born 1959), Fijian rugby player
- Pita Nwana (1881–1968), Nigerian novelist
- Pita Paraone (1945–2019), New Zealand politician
- Pita Rabo (born 1977), Fijian football player
- Pita Sharples (born 1941), New Zealand Māori academic and politician
- Pita Simogun (c. 1900 – 1987), Papua New Guinean politician
- Pita Gus Sowakula (born 1994), Fijian professional rugby player
- Pita Tamindei (c. 1918 – 1968), Papua New Guinean politician
- Pita Taufatofua (born 1983), Tongan athlete
- Pita Taumoepenu (born 1994), American football player

== Pseudonym ==
- Pita, pseudonym of Peter Rehberg (1968–2021), a European electronic musician
- Pita Amor, pseudonym of Guadalupe Teresa Amor Schmidtlein (1918–2000), Mexican poet

== Nickname ==
- Pita (footballer) or Edvaldo Oliveira Chaves (born 1958), Brazilian football player

== See also ==
- Pitta (surname)
