= Pettai, Cuddalore =

Pettai
- village
- Location within Tamil Nadu Location within India
- Coordinates: 11°26′06″N 79°44′03″E
- Country: India
- State: Tamil Nadu
- District: Cuddalore
- Taluka: Chidambaram
- Revenue block: Komaratchi

Population (2011)
  - Total: 469
- Time zone: UTC+5:30 (IST)

Pettai is a village in the southern state of Tamil Nadu, India. Administratively, Parangipettai is under the Chidambaram Taluk of Cuddalore District, Tamil Nadu. In the 2011 census 469 people were reported as living in Parangipettai.

The village of Parangipettai is .5 km west of the panchayat village of Varagur, and 1.5 km southeast of Annamalai University.
