= Laurence Schache =

Australian rules footballer

Personal information
- Born: 17 October 1967; Hopetoun, Victoria
- Died: 5 October 2002 (aged 34); Adelaide, South Australia
- Original team: Essendon
- Draft: No. 1, 1990 mid year national draft, Brisbane Bears
- Height: 194 cm (6 ft 4 in)
- Weight: 91 kg (201 lb)
- Position: Forward

Playing career^{1}
| Years | Club | Games (Goals) |
| 1988 | Sturt (SANFL) | 28 (63) |
| 1989–1990 | West Torrens (SANFL) | 32 (73) |
| 1991–1992 | Brisbane Bears (AFL) | 29 (64) |
| 1993–1994 | Woodville-West Torrens (SANFL) | 34 (78) |
- ^{1} Playing statistics correct to the end of 1992.

Career highlights
- 1991 – Leading goalkicker, Brisbane (47 goals); 1993 Premiership Player Woodville-West Torrens (SANFL)

Laurence Schache (/ˈʃæki/ SHAK-ee; 17 October 1967 – 5 October 2002) was an Australian rules footballer, playing in the Australian Football League (AFL) with the Brisbane Bears and the South Australian National Football League (SANFL) with Sturt, West Torrens and Woodville-West Torrens.

== Early life ==
Born in Hopetoun, Victoria, Schache was zoned to the Essendon Football Club in the Victorian Football League. He played in the minor grades at Essendon as a forward with some success, which included a haul of 25 goals in an under-19s match against Sydney in round 22, 1985, but he never managed to play a senior game for Essendon.

Schache moved to Adelaide in 1988 to play for Sturt, before moving to West Torrens in 1989.

== AFL career ==
Schache was drafted by Brisbane as the number one choice at the 1990 Mid Year AFL National Draft and made his AFL debut for the Bears against Geelong in round 4, 1991.

Schache played 17 games for Brisbane in 1991, winning the club's leading goalkicker award in his first season with 47 goals, including a best return of six goals against Adelaide in round 14. Schache had a less successful year in 1992, playing 12 games for 17 goals, and subsequently was delisted by Brisbane at the end of the season after 29 games and 64 goals.

Schache returned to South Australia in 1993 to play for the Woodville-West Torrens Eagles (West Torrens having merged with fellow SANFL club Woodville at the end of 1990). Schache played in the Eagles's first premiership but injured his knee the following year, forcing his retirement.

== Death ==
Schache briefly coached Latrobe Football Club in Tasmania before returning to Adelaide, where he was diagnosed with amyloidosis in July 2002. Initially told he had five years to live, Schache collapsed and died at his home, three months later. He was 34 and left a widow and two children.

== Family ==
His son Josh is also an Australian rules footballer. Josh was the No. 2 selection in the 2015 AFL draft, and played for Melbourne, Brisbane Lions and Western Bulldogs between 2016 and 2024.
