= Dangri, Jaisalmer =

Village in Rajasthan, India

Dangri
- Gram Panchayat
- Location within Rajasthan Location within India
- Coordinates: 26°32′36″N 71°23′17″E
- Country: India
- State: Rajasthan
- District: Jaisalmer

Area
  - Total: 4,336.22 ha (10,715.0 acres)

Population (2011)
  - Total: 2,384
- Time zone: UTC+5:30 (IST)
- PIN: 345027

Dangri is a village and Gram Panchayat in Fatehgarh tehsil of Jaisalmer district of Rajasthan state in India. It is situated 85 km away from district headquarter Jaisalmer. Dangri has a total population of 2,384 peoples according to Census 2011.
