= Peter III (cat) =

Chief Mouser to the Cabinet Office from 1947 to 1964

- Peter, c. 1962

Chief Mouser to the Cabinet Office
- In role 27 August 1947 – 9 March 1964
- Monarchs: George VI; Elizabeth II
- Prime Minister: Clement Attlee; Winston Churchill; Anthony Eden; Harold Macmillan; Alec Douglas-Home
- Preceded by: Peter II
- Succeeded by: Peta

Personal details
- Born: c. 1947
- Died: 9 March 1964 (aged 16)
- Resting place: Ilford, Essex, England
- Occupation: Mouser

Peter III (c. 1947 – 9 March 1964) was a cat who served as the chief mouser to the Cabinet Office from 1947 to 1964. He was the successor to Peter II, who died after being hit by a car in Whitehall. He served under five prime ministers: Clement Attlee, Winston Churchill, Anthony Eden, Harold Macmillan, and Alec Douglas-Home. He was euthanised after suffering a liver infection, aged 16, and was succeeded by Peta, a Manx cat. He was buried in Ilford, Essex.

== Life and career ==
Peter became the chief mouser to the Cabinet Office on 27 August 1947 following the death of Peter II, who had been hit by a car in Whitehall. He was still a kitten when he assumed the role and wore a tartan cat collar with a medallion bearing his name. Peter attracted widespread public attention following an appearance on the BBC current affairs programme Tonight in 1958; he also had a large fanbase in both Italy and the United States and received letters and gifts from Australia. In 1958 a worker at the Home Office, in response to a letter complaining that Peter's food allowance was too low, noted that he had left the chewed body of a pigeon inside his desk, and, as he had not fully eaten it, was therefore "not suffering from starvation".

In October 1958 it was reported that Peter's living allowance had been raised due to rising costs; a Home Office spokesman said that "everyone seems satisfied that he does his job well". However, Peter did not receive a pay increase in 1962, during the chancellor of the Exchequer Selwyn Lloyd's "Pay Pause". In 1960 Peter defecated on a doormat near the Cenotaph shortly before the Remembrance Day ceremony; it was disposed of by a civil servant before the Queen arrived. Peter appeared on the home secretary's official 1958 Christmas card, and in an October 1962 issue of the magazine Women's Realm. Throughout his life, Peter made a number of appearances in media, including in television and film. Speaking in 2017, Chris Day, the head of Modern Domestic Records at the National Archives, called Peter "the first superstar cat of Whitehall".

== Death and burial ==
Peter was euthanised on 9 March 1964 after suffering an incurable liver infection, aged 16. Two days after his death Ronald Garvey, the lieutenant governor of the Isle of Man, offered the Home Office a Manx cat; on 8 May he was replaced by that cat, called Peta. Peter's burial was held "with full honours" on 13 March 1964 at the PDSA pet cemetery in Ilford, Essex, at a plot of land that had been "reserved for Peter for several years". It was immediately preceded by a procession including a donkey, two women from the Home Office staff and various journalists and photographers. He was buried in a brass-handled veneered oak coffin, (Note: The Daily Herald states instead that the handles were made of gold.) on which a nosegay of daffodils and anemones had been placed, along with a card which read "To Peter, from an animal lover"; this was lowered into the grave from "a purple-draped wheelbarrow". At the burial, Amy Gough, a civil servant, said:

We'll miss him. He was the friendliest cat ... he slept in in-trays, and on copies of The Times, and he was particularly fond of liver.

== See also ==
- List of individual cats
- Tibs the Great, British Post Office cat who served around the same time
