= Peter (chief mouser) =

Chief Mouser to the Cabinet Office, 1929 to 1946

Chief Mouser to the Cabinet Office
- Held title 1929–1946 Serving with Treasury Bill (1929—c. 1930)
- Monarchs: George V Edward VIII; George VI
- Prime Minister: Ramsay MacDonald; Stanley Baldwin; Neville Chamberlain; Winston Churchill; Clement Attlee
- Preceded by: Treasury Bill
- Succeeded by: Munich Mouser

Personal details
- Occupation: Mouser
- Gender: Male

Peter was a cat who served as Chief Mouser to the Cabinet Office of the United Kingdom between 1929 and 1946. Whilst Peter was the second cat to serve in this role, he is often considered the first, as his predecessor, Treasury Bill, served for less than a year, and was not officially given the title.

Peter is described as being a black cat, and was a resident at the Home Office at the time of his appointment. In 1929, the Treasury agreed to allow one penny daily for Peter's upkeep, which included his food and wellbeing requirements. Until the approved spending bill began to better regulate Peter's diet, civil servants had been bringing Peter an excess of food through the day, causing him to neglect his primary role of catching mice.

His newly limited diet proved effective at encouraging Peter to catch rodents. It was remarked that when the Home Office was relocated to Bournemouth during World War II, Peter's services were missed so much that they applied for allowances for the upkeep of two cats.

Peter was considered by civil servants to have performed "admirably" in his role. He served under five prime ministers in Conservative, Labour and coalition governments, during a period of British history defined by the Great Slump and World War II. Peter's tenure defined multiple precedents for the Chief Mouser position, which have been emulated by his successors in the role. Peter and a later office holder Peter III are jointly the longest serving Chief Mousers since records began, both having served for approximately 17 years.

== See also ==
- List of individual cats
