= Munich Mouser =

Chief Mouser to the Cabinet Office from 1937 to 1943

Chief Mouser to the Cabinet Office
- In role 28 May 1937 – c. 5 August 1943 Serving with Peter and Nelson (1940–1943)
- Monarch: George VI
- Prime Minister: Neville Chamberlain; Winston Churchill
- Preceded by: Peter
- Succeeded by: Nelson

Personal details
- Born: c. 1936 Carlisle, Cumberland, England
- Died: c. 5 August 1943 Downing Street, London, England
- Occupation: Mouser
- Other name: Bob (Note: Sometimes referred to in the press as Joey or Toby.)

Bob (c. 1936 – c. 5 August 1943), nicknamed the Munich Mouser, also known simply as Munich, was a cat who served as the chief mouser to the Cabinet Office from 1937 to 1943. He served under the prime minister, Neville Chamberlain, from 1937 to 1940, and his successor Winston Churchill until 1943. He therefore served in the role at the same time as Peter and Nelson, the latter who became chief mouser in summer 1940 and had a rivalry with Munich.

== Life and career ==
Munich's two prime ministers

Chamberlain

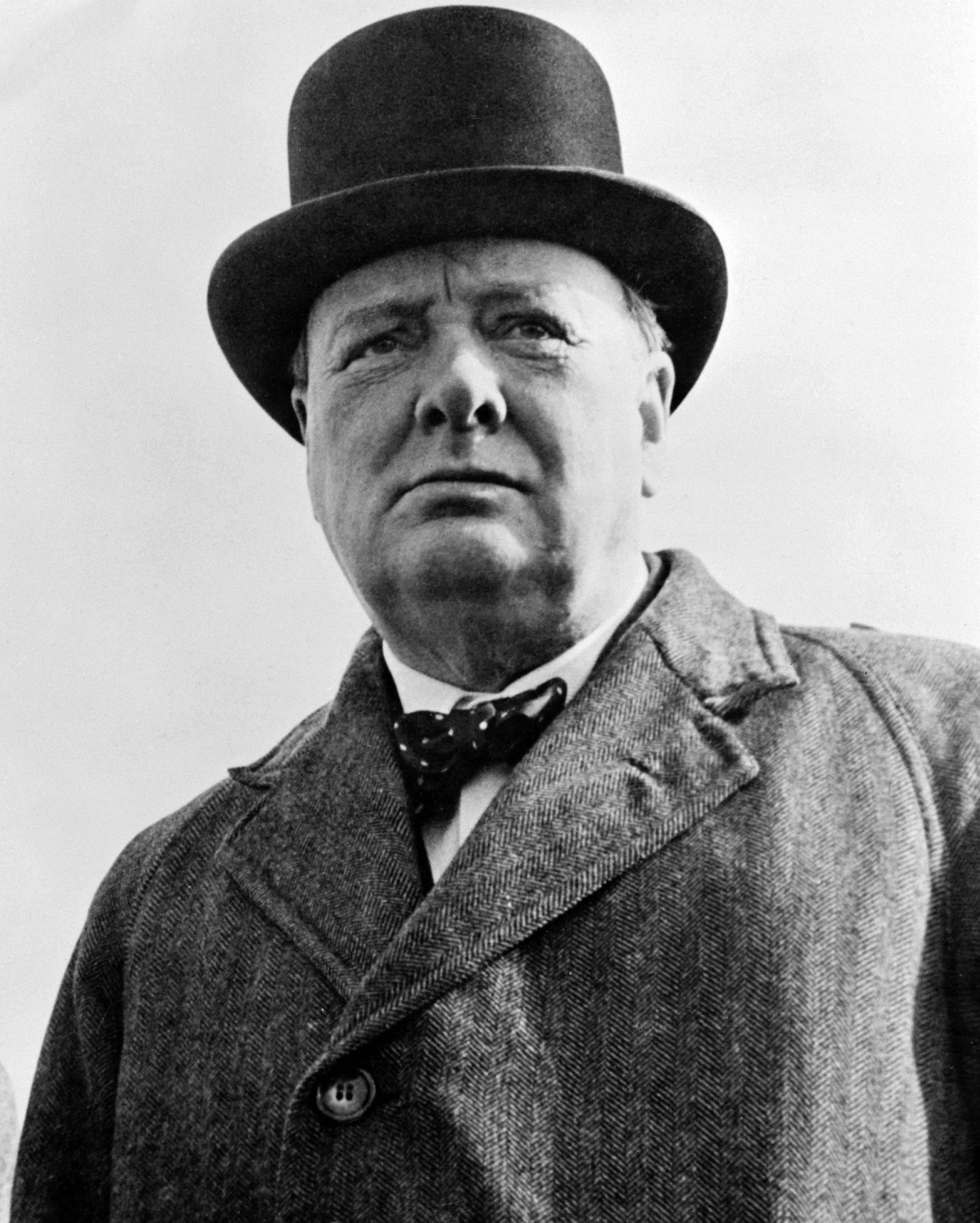
Churchill

=== Under Neville Chamberlain (1937–1940) ===
Bob was born around the year 1936. (Note: At the time of his death in August 1943, The Gazette reported that Munich was seven years old.) The St. Louis Post-Dispatch reported that he was descended from the cat of Thomas Wolsey. Bob arrived in Downing Street on 28 May 1937, the day Neville Chamberlain became the prime minister. Owing to his role as a civil servant, Bob received a salary. In 1939 Anne, Chamberlain's wife, suggested that the history of 10 Downing Street might start with its first occupant, the daughter of Charles II, and end with Bob. Winston Churchill "rather scathing[ly]" nicknamed Bob Munich Mouser because of the Munich Agreement, signed by Chamberlain and the Führer of Germany, Adolf Hitler. During the crisis which precipitated the agreement, Munich regularly sat on the doorstep of Number 10, making him "an omen of good luck and an augury for peace". After his death, it was speculated that, during the talks, Munich agreed more with Chamberlain than with the Nazis. In the press he was known simply as "Munich" or "the Munich cat".

In September 1938 The News Tribune published a poem addressed to Munich which contained the lines:

Parliament keeps you with tender care;
Briton's concerns you should gladly share;
Did Neville do right on that air-plane trip?
Speak and we'll order some fresh catnip!

In November that year, Munich received two Dover soles as a reward for his conduct during the Munich crisis. In February 1940 a "Mrs. Walter M. Newkirk", on behalf of her cat Phoebe Adams Newkirk, sent Munich food— a "delicious present"—for which he "sent" a letter of thanks. That same month, with the backdrop of the Winter War in Finland, another poem appeared, this time in the Press & Sun-Bulletin, which read:

You who scamper before the feet of the mighty in the days of crisis and high decision, tell us now. What will happen to Finland? ...
What's the matter with England, black cat of Downing Street? Has it lost the power to decide in time? Is it no longer able to say the right thing before the wrong thing becomes so obvious?

=== Under Winston Churchill (1940–1943) ===
Chamberlain resigned as prime minister in May 1940 and was succeeded by Churchill, who brought his black cat, Nelson, with him during the summer. The two cats "had a rivalry", which has been compared in the media to that of the 21st-century mousers Larry and Palmerston. Before Nelson's arrival, commenters in the press wondered whether he and Munich would get along:

How, it is asked, will the "Munich" cat react to "Nelson"? Will it follow Mr. Chamberlain next door to his new home at No. 11, leaving the field at No. 10 to "Nelson"? Or will it refuse to abdicate and call for a showdown in his majesty's court of justice?

Nevertheless, Munich remained in place during Churchill's first premiership, with the cat and the prime minister reported to have a decent relationship; The Daily Telegraph instead erroneously reported that Munich had been "chased out of Downing Street". During World War II, the Treasury—Munich's residence—was bombed, and he was forced to move into the Foreign Office building.

== Death ==
Munich was found dead outside Number 10 on 5 August 1943. In newspaper reports covering his death, it was revealed that Munich had produced a son with another cat. Some in the press published negative obituaries: he was described by the Birmingham Post as "disagreeable", "unfriendly", and "[how] one imagines Ribbentrop would have been had he been a cat", and by the Evening Chronicle as a "detestable quisling". (Note: The Chronicle published their story several months after Munich's death, and reported that he was still alive.) The Huddersfield Daily Examiner instead stated that he "had a great reputation for 'ratting'" and the Edmonton Bulletin said that "Downing Street will miss him". Upon Munich's death, a member of the Newkirk family—which had sent him the food parcel five years prior—expressed their sorrow.

== See also ==
- List of individual cats
