= Public expenditure tracking system =

Public expenditure tracking system (PETS) is a system that presents financial information that enables stakeholders to track the source of money and where it is being dispensed. PETS also allows the service users to reconcile incoming funds with expenditures. It is sometimes referred to as "following the money". PETS are increasingly used at district level in countries like Uganda and Tanzania to make budget flows transparent from local government to service delivery agents.
