= Mobility Worldwide =

US-based non-profit organization

Mobility Worldwide logo

Mobility Worldwide is a faith-based, volunteer-driven, 501(c)(3) non-profit organization.

PET is an acronym for the Personal Energy Transportation, a vehicle that the group constructs and distributes at no cost to provide the gift of mobility to disabled children and adults worldwide. PET International, Inc. began doing business as Mobility Worldwide in August 2016 and began using the name Mobility Cart for the vehicle. Since 1994, over 80,000 Mobility Carts have been built and distributed by over 70 distribution partners.

== History ==
PET grew out of a 1994 trip by Methodist missionary Reverend Larry Hills to Zaire, where he first recognized the need for the device when he encountered survivors of polio and landmines who could not walk and could not use wheelchairs in their rural environments. Hills and his wife, Laura, spoke with Reverend Mel West about a modified wheelchair that might serve, hand-cranked with three wheels. During 1995, West involved product designer Earl Miner in producing a prototype built with sturdiness, simplicity and cost effectiveness. In 1996, four prototypes were put to the test in Zaire. Based on their performance, PETs went into production and shipped for distribution in Zaire.

The following year, PET production began to expand into other countries, beginning with Mozambique. In 2000, to meet growing demand, West opened a facility in Columbia, Missouri, US, which serves to receive donated parts, to assemble PETs and ship them internationally. A second US facility was opened in Penney Farms, Florida (near Jacksonville, Florida), by the Hills that same year. In 2003, a third facility was established in Luling, Texas.

In 2004, to help manage the growth and production of PETs, Pet International was incorporated, with a board of trustees and staff to help manage all issues related to assembling and distributing PETs. The cost of the components for a PET is roughly $300. In a typical year, around 750 carts are distributed worldwide.

The mobility carts are packaged with plastic milk jugs so that recipients can reuse them to hold clean drinking water. They are delivered at no cost through collaborations with non-governmental organizations.

== Countries ==
PET carts have been shipped to Afghanistan, Afghanistan, Argentina, Armenia, Angola, Bahamas, Bangladesh, Belize, Benin, Bolivia, Bosnia, Botswana, Brasil, Bulgaria, Burkina Faso, Burundi, Cambodia, Cameroon, Chad, China, Colombia, Costa Rica, Cuba, Democratic Republic of Congo, Democratic Republic of São Tomé and Príncipe, Djibouti, Dominican Republic, Ecuador, El Salvador, Eritrea, Ethiopia, Fiji, Gabon, Gambia, Gaza, Georgia, Ghana, Guatemala, Guinea, Guinea-Bissau, Haiti, Honduras, India, Indonesia, Iraq, Ivory Coast, Jamaica, Jordan, Kazakhstan, Kenya, Kosovo, Kyrgyzstan, Laos, Latvia, Liberia, Madagascar, Malawi, Mali, Mauritius, Mexico, Micronesia, Moldova, Mongolia, Morocco, Mozambique, Myanmar, Namibia, Nepal, Nicaragua, Niger, Nigeria, North Korea, Pakistan, Panama, Papua New Guinea, Paraguay, Peru, Philippines, Republic of Congo, Romania, Russia, Rwanda, Samoa, Senegal, Sierra Leone, Somalia, Sri Lanka, Republic of South Sudan, Swaziland, Syria, Tajikistan, Tanzania, Thailand, Togo, Tonga, Trinidad, Turkey, Uzbekistan, Uganda, Ukraine, Uruguay, Vanuatu, Vietnam, West Bank, Western Sahara, Zambia, and Zimbabwe.
