= Josh Schache =

Australian rules footballer (born 1997)

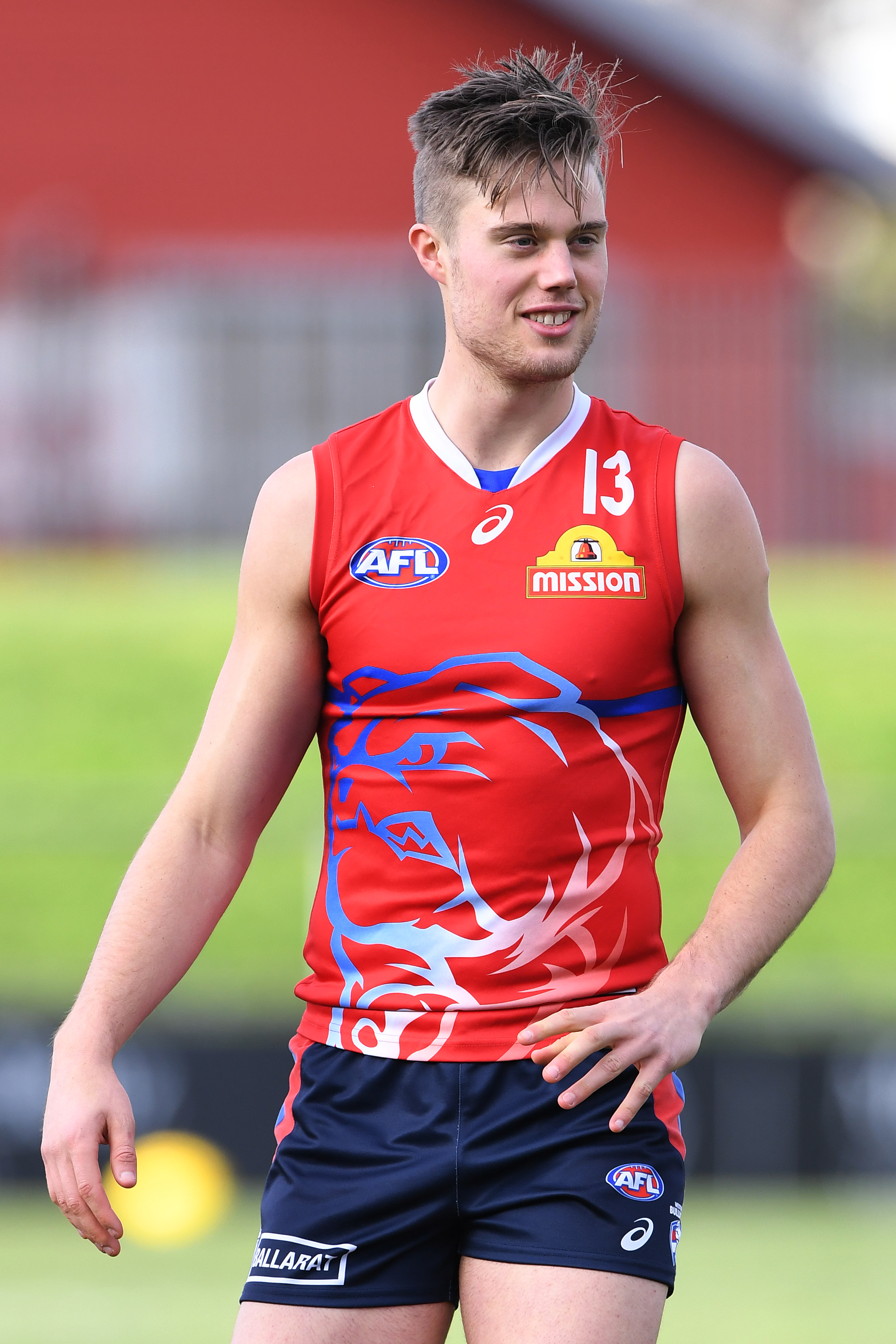
- Schache training for Western Bulldogs in August 2018

Personal information
- Full name: Joshua Schache
- Born: 21 August 1997 (age 29); Adelaide, South Australia
- Original team: Murray Bushrangers (TAC Cup)
- Draft: No. 2, 2015 national draft
- Height: 199 cm (6 ft 6 in)
- Weight: 94 kg (207 lb)
- Position: Full-forward

Playing career
Years	Club	Games (Goals)
2016–2017	Brisbane Lions	27 (25)
2018–2022	Western Bulldogs	45 (53)
2023–2024	Melbourne	4 (1)
Total		76 (79)

Career highlights
- Larke Medal 2015

Joshua Schache (/ˈʃæki/ SHAK-ee; born 21 August 1997) is a former Australian rules footballer who played professionally for the Brisbane Lions, the Western Bulldogs and Melbourne in the Australian Football League (AFL).

== Early life ==
Schache was born in Adelaide, South Australia to mother Rachel and father Laurence. He started playing Auskick when he was in grade five. He attended high school at Assumption College Kilmore and later Goulburn Valley Grammar School. His late father, Laurence, also played with Brisbane in the early 1990s.

Josh spent his early youth as a ruckman/forward for the Seymour Lions, a club based in the Seymour District Junior Football League. He played with the Murray Bushrangers in the TAC Cup until he was selected to join the Brisbane Lions with the second pick in the 2015 AFL draft.

Schache is left-footed, 199 centimetres (78 in) tall and weighs 96 kilograms (212 lb).

He won the Larke Medal for his performance in the NAB AFL Under-18 Championships in 2015, where he also he kicked a record 24 goals.

== AFL career ==
In the first two years of his career at the Brisbane Lions, Schache played 27 games and kicked 25 goals. During 2017 there was speculation that he would request a trade to a Victorian club, but at the end of the season his manager shut down speculation, insisting that he would not be requesting a trade. Despite this, Brisbane later announced they would be exploring trade options for Schache in the forthcoming trade period. In the final minutes of the trade period, Schache was traded to the Western Bulldogs for pick 25 and 40 despite being contracted until 2019 at the Brisbane Lions. Schache overcame niggling injuries during the first half of 2018. After strong performances in the VFL he was elevated to the senior side where he finished the season with 17 goals in 13 games. Schache had a breakout year in 2019, kicking 24 goals from 14 games, only being omitted from the side due to concussion protocols. Schache played in the 2019 Elimination Final against club rivals, Greater Western Sydney. After playing his career best year, Schache only managed to play two senior games in 2020, kicking 2 goals.

After a one-off appearance earlier in 2021, he returned to the senior side in the middle of the season, successfully moving to become a key defender. Schache managed to play every game for the rest of the year, as a defender too, including the clubs impressive climb to the Grand Final. Schache was moved back to the forward line for the 2021 finals, kicking 4 goals and shutting down prominent key defenders such as Aliir Aliir of Port Adelaide. He played in the Western Bulldogs' 2021 Grand Final team.

Following the 2022 AFL season, Schache was traded to Melbourne on the last day of the trade period. Schache managed only four games across two seasons for the Demons. When Melbourne failed to make finals for the first time since 2020, Schache was delisted at the conclusion of the 2024 AFL season.

In 2025, Schache will play for the Doncaster East Football Club in the Eastern Football Netball League (EFNL).

== Statistics ==
Legend
G	Goals	K	Kicks	D	Disposals	T	Tackles
B	Behinds	H	Handballs	M	Marks

Season	Team	No.	Games	Totals							Averages (per game)							Votes
Season	Team	No.	Games	G	B	K	H	D	M	T	G	B	K	H	D	M	T	Votes
2016	Brisbane Lions	23	17	16	18	91	56	147	68	26	0.9	1.1	5.4	3.3	8.6	4.0	1.5	0
2017	Brisbane Lions	23	10	9	6	55	36	91	39	10	0.9	0.6	5.5	3.6	9.1	3.9	1.0	0
2018	Western Bulldogs	13	13	17	11	98	61	159	53	14	1.3	0.8	7.5	4.7	12.2	4.1	1.1	0
2019	Western Bulldogs	13	14	24	8	86	55	141	37	25	1.7	0.6	6.1	3.9	10.1	2.6	1.8	1
2020 (Note: The 2020 season was played with 17 home-and-away matches per team (down from 22) and 16-minute quarters with time on (down from 20-minute quarters with time on) due to the impact of the COVID-19 pandemic.)	Western Bulldogs	13	2	2	0	8	5	13	3	0	1.0	0.0	4.0	2.5	6.5	1.5	0.0	0
2021	Western Bulldogs	13	9	5	4	67	27	94	41	11	0.6	0.4	7.4	3.0	10.4	4.6	1.2	0
2022	Western Bulldogs	13	7	5	5	48	14	62	31	14	0.7	0.7	6.9	2.0	8.9	4.4	2.0	0
2023	Melbourne	19	3	1	1	7	3	10	5	2	0.3	0.3	2.3	1.0	3.3	1.7	0.7	0
2024	Melbourne	19	1	0	2	3	1	4	2	2	0.0	2.0	3.0	1.0	4.0	2.0	2.0	0
Career			76	79	55	463	258	721	279	104	1.0	0.7	6.1	3.4	9.5	3.7	1.4	1

== Honours and achievements ==
Individual

- Larke Medal: 2015
