= Xavier Di Petta =

Australian-American entrepreneur (born 1996)

Xavier Di Petta is an Australian-American internet entrepreneur, music producer, and internet personality. He is currently "Australia's most followed TikToker" with over twenty-million followers. Di Petta has been featured in The Times' 'Top 25 Under 20' and 'The 15 Smartest Teens on the Planet'. Di Petta has amassed followings that exceed 100 million across various social networks.

== Early life ==
Di Petta was born and raised in Shepparton, Victoria, a small Australian town two hours north of Melbourne. At six, he represented Australia in the Nintendo World Championships. Di Petta attended the University of Southern California.

He started a YouTube account back in 2007, which at one point became the 10th most subscribed to channel in Australia. In 2009, Di Petta "found email addresses for YouTube staffers in a lawsuit document and contacted them directly about a new program that allowed him to make money from his videos."

Di Petta has curated for Condé Nast, including GQ and LOVE. Di Petta was a speaker at TEDxTeen in May 2015. In 2016, Di Petta stated that TikTok (formerly musical.ly) "truly is the next big platform."

Di Petta Had a YouTube channel named GoodSnacksTakeTime - https://www.youtube.com/user/GoodSnacksTakeTIme

== Career ==
In 2012, Di Petta created Fitspiration, designed to help users keep motivated about fitness. The application was the number-one fitness application in the United States, Australia and New Zealand, among others. Di Petta's firm, Swift Fox Labs, works with brands such as NBC, GE and Nike.

In July 2013, Di Petta created @EarthPix and @HistoryInPics on Twitter with Kyle Cameron. @EarthPix on Instagram has over 14M followers and is ranked the 113th Most Followed Instagram account. At 17, Di Petta co-founded Social Trends Media; focusing on business development and partnerships. Social Trends Media earned $800,000 in sales in December 2013. In December 2014, All Day Media (formerly Social Trends Media) raised $2,000,000 in venture capital funding.

In the summer of 2016, Di Petta met fellow music producer Nick Iavarone in a USC dorm room. The duo released the first single off their EP Liquid Powder under the stage name PARTY SHIRT in 2020, and the pair watched as their debut single "Dancing Tonight" hit No. 1 on the TikTok pop chart. Since then, the song has been featured in more than 50,000 TikTok videos and has accumulated more than 200 million views. The duo now release music under the name X & Ivy.

Di Petta and Iavarone are most famous for their series Fact or Cap, where they put seemingly simple life hacks to the test to determine if they're real or fake. Their series earned them the title of "America’s Most Trusted Journalists" by VICE.

In November 2022, Di Petta signed with talent agency WME. In September 2023, Di Petta released a cookbook with Abrams Books alongside Nick Iavarone and Jenn Garbee, titled The Party Shirt Cookbook: 100 Recipes for Next-Level Eats.
