= Tiddles (disambiguation) =

Tiddles was a famously fat cat.

Tiddles may also refer to:

- List of Are You Being Served? characters#Tiddles and Winston, Mrs Slocombe's cat on Are You Being Served?
- Ship's cat#Tiddles, a Royal Navy ship's cat
- Tiddles the Tiger snake, a character in the Australian children's television cartoon series Kangaroo Creek Gang
- Tiddles, a 1970 play by Henry Livings
- Tiddles, a genus of marine flatworms in the infraorder Maricola
- A cultivar of Delphinium
