= Undercover Kitty =

Undercover Kitty may refer to:

- Undercover Kitty (film), a 2001 Dutch film
- Fred the Undercover Kitty, a cat that worked for New York Police Department
