= List of individual cats =

This is a list of individual cats who have achieved some degree of popularity or notability.

== Before the modern era ==
- Nedjem or Nojem (Egyptian: nḏm "Sweet One" or "Sweetie"), 15th century BCE. The cat of Puimre, second priest of Amun during the reign of Thutmose III. Depicted on a damaged relief from Puimre's tomb, Nedjem is the earliest known cat to bear an individual name.
- Ta-Miu (Egyptian: tꜣ mjw "She-Cat"), 14th century BCE. The cat of Crown Prince Thutmose, mummified after her death and buried in a decorated sarcophagus in Prince Thutmose's own tomb following his own early demise.
- Muezza, 7th century CE. The (possibly apocryphal) cat of the Islamic prophet Muhammad.
- Pangur Bán (Old Irish "White Pangur"; the meaning of the latter word is unclear), 8th–9th century CE. The cat of an otherwise unknown Irish monk, who wrote a poem cataloguing the similarities between the cat's character and his own.
- Polleke (died c. 1440–1460) is a 15th-century mummified cat that was discovered in 1906 inside the walls of the Grote Kerk in Breda, Netherlands. In 2025, the cat was officially named Polleke and returned to public display in the church.

== Famous in own right ==
=== Space flight ===
- Félicette, the only cat ever launched into space. Launched by the French Centre d'Enseignement et de Recherches de Médecine Aéronautique (CERMA) on 18 October 1963, Félicette was recovered alive after a 15-minute flight and a descent by parachute. Félicette had electrodes implanted into her brain, and the recorded neural impulses were transmitted back to Earth.

=== By country ===
==== Belgium ====
- Maximus Textoris Pulcher, a Scottish Fold cat adopted by Prime Minister Bart De Wever. An official resident of the Prime Minister's office at Rue de la Loi 16, Maximus has a popular account on Instagram.

==== Canada ====
- Tuxedo Stan, a cat who ran for mayor of Halifax, Nova Scotia.

==== Czech Republic ====
- Micka, Czech Republic's "First Cat" belonging to the President Petr Pavel

==== Ecuador ====
- Michi, also known as the Embassy Cat, Julian Assange's cat that lived with him in the Ecuadorian Embassy in London until Assange's arrest.

==== Indonesia ====
- Bobby Kertanegara, a domestic shorthaired tabby cat, known for being the pet of Indonesian President Prabowo Subianto.

==== Japan ====
- Tama, a series of cats who serve as a railway station master and operating officer at Kishi Station on the Kishigawa Line in Kinokawa, Wakayama Prefecture, Japan. Tama I was a calico who served in that role from 2007 to 2015; posthumously promoted to Honorable Eternal Stationmaster. Tama II (Nitama) replaced her part-time from 2012 to 2015, when after Tama I's death succeeded her from 2015 to 2025. The Wakayama Electric Railway has since featured different railway station managers, all named Tama. The Kishi station is current alternated by Tama IV (Yontama), who works four days a week, and her apprentice Tama VI (Rokutama).

==== Jersey ====
- Oscar, a cat in Jersey fitted with 'bionic' hind limbs designed by vet Noel Fitzpatrick following an accident in 2009.

==== New Zealand ====
- Mittens (~2009 to present), a ginger Turkish Angora who wandered Wellington, New Zealand especially in Te Aro, before his relocation to Auckland. He has a Facebook fanbase who regularly post photos of him climbing into rental cars, entering businesses, and napping in unusual places.
- Paddles, New Zealand's "First Cat", a polydactyl cat that belonged to Prime Minister Jacinda Ardern

==== Poland ====
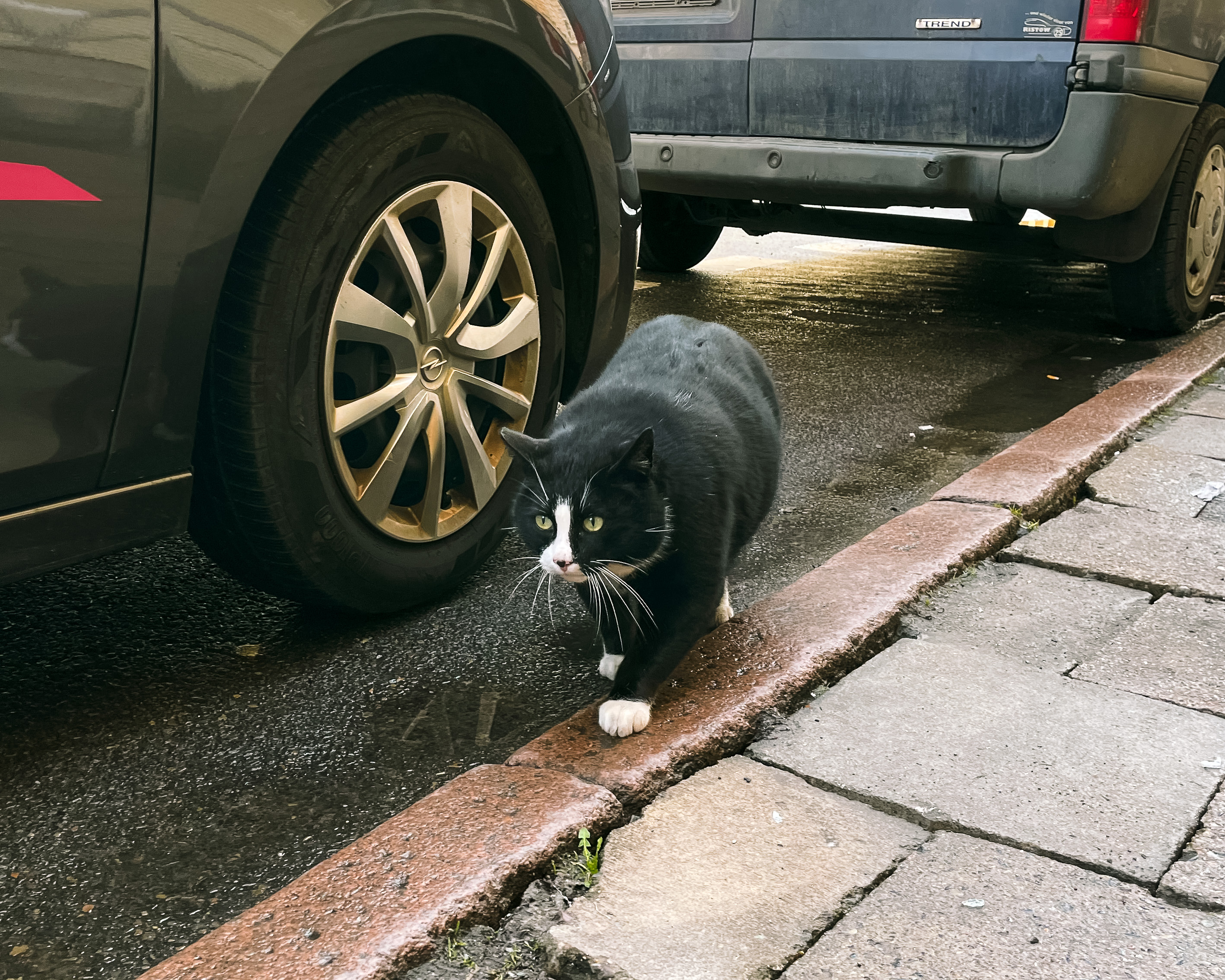
Gacek in Szczecin

- Gacek, a male domestic cat with tuxedo fur, who over the years 2020–2023 has become a prominent tourist attraction in the city of Szczecin, Poland, and received widespread attention from international media.

==== Russia ====
- Rusik, the Russian police sniffer cat in Stavropol, who died in the line of duty fighting against illegal endangered sturgeon fish traffic in 2003.

==== Sweden ====
- Luffar-Lasse (Swedish: "Lasse the Vagabond"), an orange cat that gained notoriety for his daily excursions to the Överby shopping center in Trollhättan, Sweden. His return home is usually done by hitchhiking in one of the shopping center's visitors' cars. He became associated with the Swedish annual charity fundraiser Musikhjälpen of which he has brought in more than 2,000,000 SEK. In 2024 he starred in the Slow television show "En helg med Luffar-Lasse" and a statue in his honor was erected close to his usual whereabouts at the Överby shopping center.

==== Taiwan ====
- Longjiaosun
- Mikan
- Think Think and Ah Tsai, who belong to Tsai Ing-wen, the former President of Taiwan.

==== Turkey ====
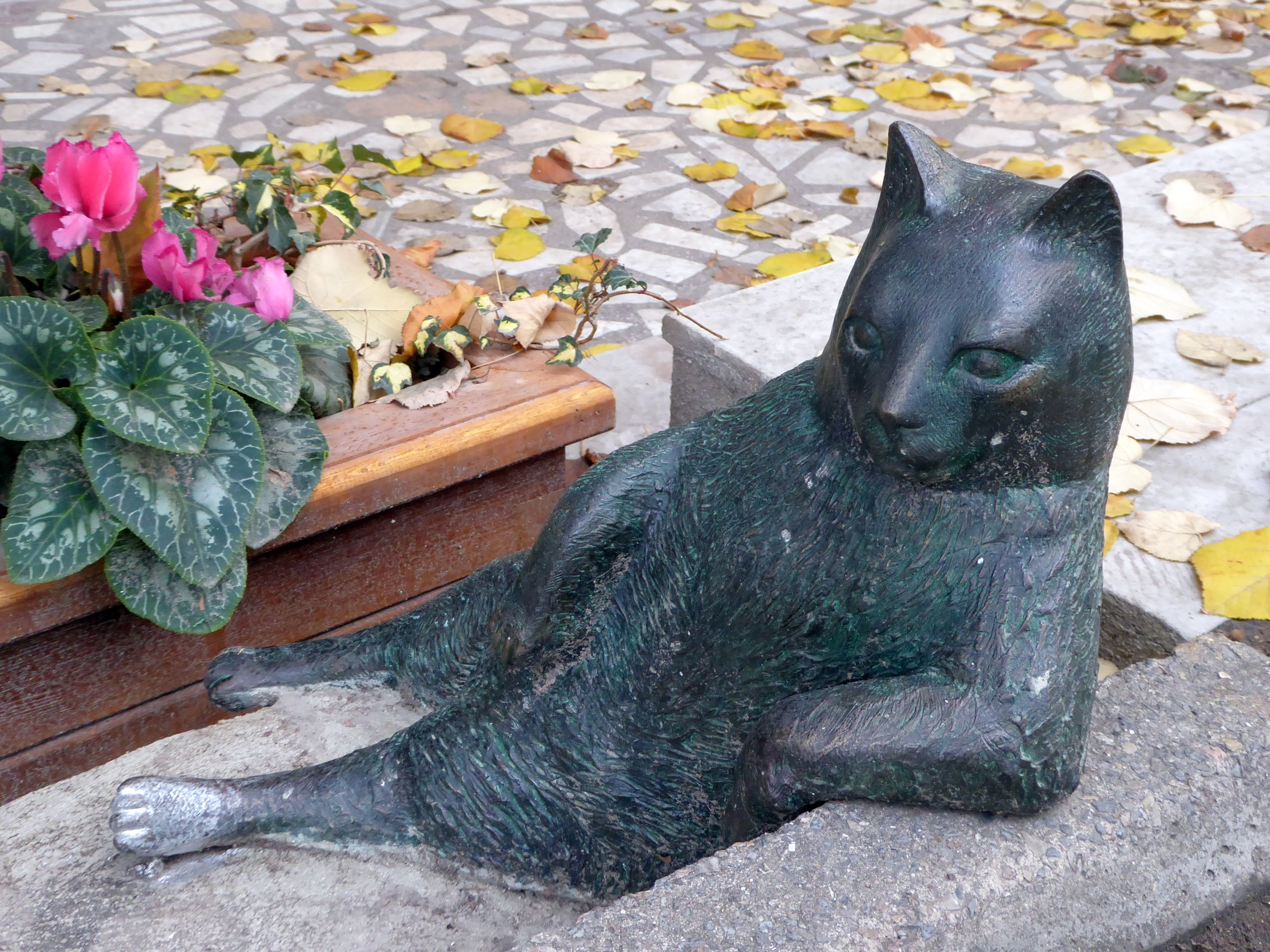
Statue of Tombili in Istanbul

- Gli, a cat from Istanbul best known for living in the Hagia Sophia.
- Tombili, popular street cat from Istanbul who had a statue made of him after his death.
- Şerafettin who resided in the headquarters of the Republican People's Party was a significant icon in Turkish politics before dying at the age of 20.

==== Qatar ====
- Pizza Cat, a stray cat that resides in Al Udeid Air Base that is popular with American troops deployed to the base.

==== Ukraine ====
- Stepan (Ukrainian: Степан) is a striped cat from Kharkiv, who became famous worldwide during the COVID-19 pandemic. His Instagram page helped raise support for Ukrainian animals after the Russian invasion of Ukraine in 2022. Stepan was appointed as an 'ambassador' by the Ministry of Culture and Information Policy as part of their 'Save Ukrainian Culture' campaign. In 2024, after Stepan became ill from the continuing attacks, he and his owner relocated to Germany.

==== United Kingdom ====
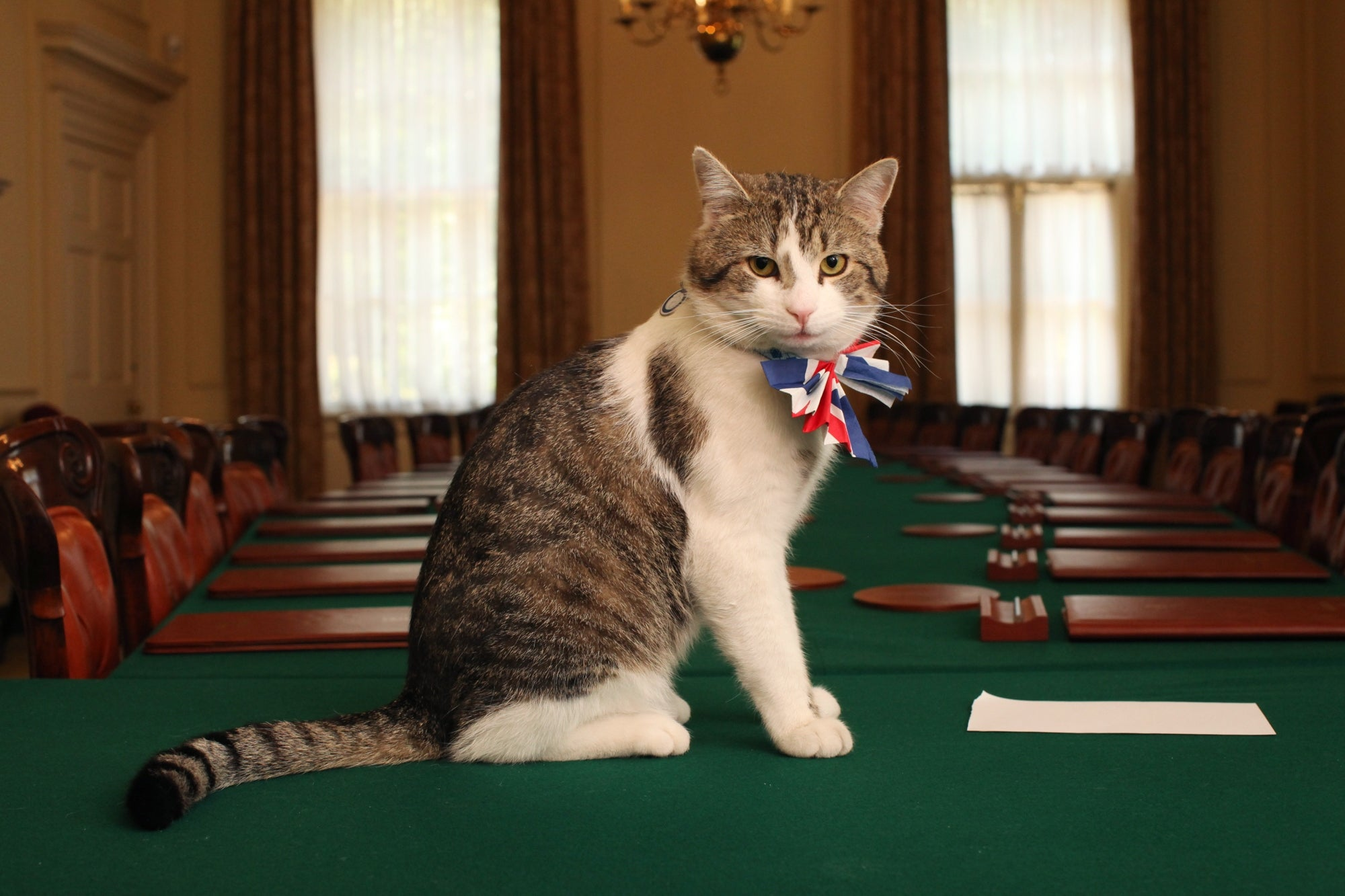
Chief Mouser to the Cabinet Office, Larry

- Attlee, resident cat of the Speaker of the House of Commons, named for Prime Minister Clement Attlee
- Beerbohm, a cat that resided at the Gielgud Theatre in London.
- Bob (?–2020), a London street cat made famous in books and a film
- Casper (1997–2010), a cat who regularly rode the bus on his own in Plymouth and had a book written about his story.
- Catmando, joint leader of the Official Monster Raving Loony Party from 1999 to 2002
- Chief Mousers to the British Cabinet Office: Freya, Humphrey, Larry, Munich Mouser, Nelson, Peta, Peter, Peter II, Peter III, Rufus, Sybil, Wilberforce
- Crimean Tom, a cat that helped British Army troops find food after the Siege of Sevastopol
- Faith, a London cat that took up residence in St Faith & St Augustine's church (by St Paul's Cathedral) in wartime, and received a PDSA Silver Medal for her bravery in caring for her kitten when the church was bombed.
- Gladstone, Chief Mouser of HM Treasury at Whitehall in London from 2016 to 2019.
- Hamish McHamish (1999 – 11 September 2014), a long-haired ginger cat that was adopted by the citizens of the town of St Andrews, Fife, Scotland, and has had a statue built in his honour.
- Doorkins Magnificat, a brown female tabby who was resident cat of Southwark Cathedral, London from 2008 to 2018 and the subject of the children's book Doorkins the Cathedral Cat. In 2020 a male tuxedo cat named Hodge took on the role of mouser for the cathedral.
- Hodge, the "very fine cat" of Samuel Johnson
- Jock, the favourite cat of Winston Churchill in his later life. Named after Jock Colville, who gave Churchill the cat for his 88th birthday. The National Trust now ensures that there is always a marmalade cat called Jock at Churchill's home, Chartwell.
- Mike (1908 – January 1929), a cat who guarded the entrance to the British Museum.
- Nala, a cat popular with commuters, known for sitting on ticket barriers at Stevenage railway station
- Nelson, Prime Minister Winston Churchill's cat, who resided at 10 Downing Street and elsewhere during the Blitz. Noted in Erik Larson's book The Splendid and the Vile and elsewhere.
- Orlando, a ginger cat who outperformed professional money managers when managing investments over fiscal year 2012. Orlando selected investments by throwing his favorite toy onto a grid of numbers representing stock picks. By the end of the year, he had increased his portfolio over 10%, from £5,000 to £5,542.
- Palmerston, Chief Mouser of the Foreign & Commonwealth Office from 2016 to 2020
- Peter, the Lord's cat, the only animal to have an obituary in Wisden Cricketers' Almanack.
- Simon, a ship's cat on HMS Amethyst during the Amethyst Incident, and the only cat to earn the Dickin Medal for distinguished and meritorious service.
- Simpkin, the traditional name of the mouser of Hertford College, Oxford, named after a character in the book The Tailor of Gloucester, by Beatrix Potter. The current incumbent, from 2017, is Simpkin IV.
- Tibs the Great (November 1950 – December 1964) was the British Post Office's "number one cat" and kept the post office headquarters completely mouse-free during his 14 years of service.
- Tiddles, tabby resident of the ladies' toilet at Paddington Station, London. Thousands of passengers met him and their donations fed him.
- Tiddles, born on HMS Argus and served aboard HMS Victorious during the 1940s as the Captain's cat. He sailed over 30,000 miles spending virtualy his whole life at sea. His favorite position was on the capstan playing with the bell rope.
- Tobermory Cat, a cat living in Tobermory, made famous by Angus Stewart.
- Unsinkable Sam, the ship's cat that survived the sinking of German battleship Bismarck, HMS Cossack and HMS Ark Royal.

==== United States ====
- US Presidential Cats: India "Willie" Bush (George W. Bush), Misty Malarky Ying Yang (Jimmy Carter), Puffins (Woodrow Wilson), Shan (Gerald Ford's daughter, Susan), Socks Clinton (Bill Clinton), Tabby and Dixie (Abraham Lincoln), Tiger and Blacky (Calvin Coolidge), Willow (Joe Biden)
- Bella the Alamo cat, cat residing on the property of the Alamo mission.
- Blackie the Talking Cat, a "talking" cat who was exhibited (for donations) by an unemployed couple on the streets of Augusta, Georgia. Blackie became the subject of a court case, Miles v. City Council of Augusta.
- Blue, a Siamese cat taken hostage in Gresham, Oregon, in a grocery store in 1994.
- Browser, Texas library cat
- Brünnhilde, a cat known for having her photos displayed by the Library of Congress.
- CC (Copy Cat, or Carbon Cat), the first cloned cat.
- Cheeto (UC Davis Cat), a cat living on the UC Davis campus near the physics building.
- Dusty the Klepto Kitty (US), notorious for being an expert night cat burglar.
- Francine, a cat living in a Lowe's store in Richmond, Virginia.
- Frank and Louie, the longest surviving janus cat on record.
- F. D. C. Willard, or Felis Domesticus Chester Willard, a feline physicist, co-author and author, owned by Jack H. Hetherington.
- Fred the Undercover Kitty, a cat famous for assisting the NYPD and Brooklyn District Attorney's Office in 2006.
- Hank the Cat, a Maine Coon who ran for Senate in the commonwealth of Virginia in the 2012 US elections. He finished in third place behind winner Democrat Tim Kaine.
- Hap the Ocicat, a cat of the Ocicat breed with a sizable Facebook and Instagram presence due to his association with the United States Air Force and aviation.
- Jack, a cat who was lost by American Airlines baggage handlers at John F. Kennedy International Airport before Hurricane Irene. He was found later but was severely dehydrated and malnourished after his 61-day ordeal and was euthanized.
- Jorts, office pet whose persona was used by a Twitter account to support workers
- KitKat, a cat who was killed by a Waymo car in San Francisco.
- Lewis, a cat who became infamous after being placed under house arrest.
- Little Nicky, the first commercially cloned pet.
- Mayor Stubbs, a cat who was honorary mayor of the town of Talkeetna, Alaska, from 1997 until his death in 2017.
- Nora, a gray tabby cat who apparently amuses herself by playing the piano.
- Oscar the hospice cat, written up in the New England Journal of Medicine for his uncanny ability to predict which patients will die by curling up to sleep with them hours before their death. To date he has been right 100+ times.
- Pot Roast, a cat that went viral on TikTok.
- Ruby, a cat from Germantown, Maryland, who became an internet celebrity in 2016 after her owner, Sam Steingard, took her as his date to his high school prom, complete with a custom pink dress.
- Room 8, a tomcat who appeared at Elysian Heights Elementary School in Echo Park, California, at the start of the school year in 1952, returning every day thereafter, before disappearing for the summer, only to return the following September. This behavior continued into the mid-1960s. (Ref. Los Angeles Times)
- Scarlett, who in 1996 saved her kittens one by one from a fire in Brooklyn, New York, suffering horrible burns in the process. Named Scarlett by the fireman who rescued her. She became a famous example of the power of a mother's love.
- Venus, an American tortoiseshell cat whose face is half black and half red tabby.

=== On the Internet ===
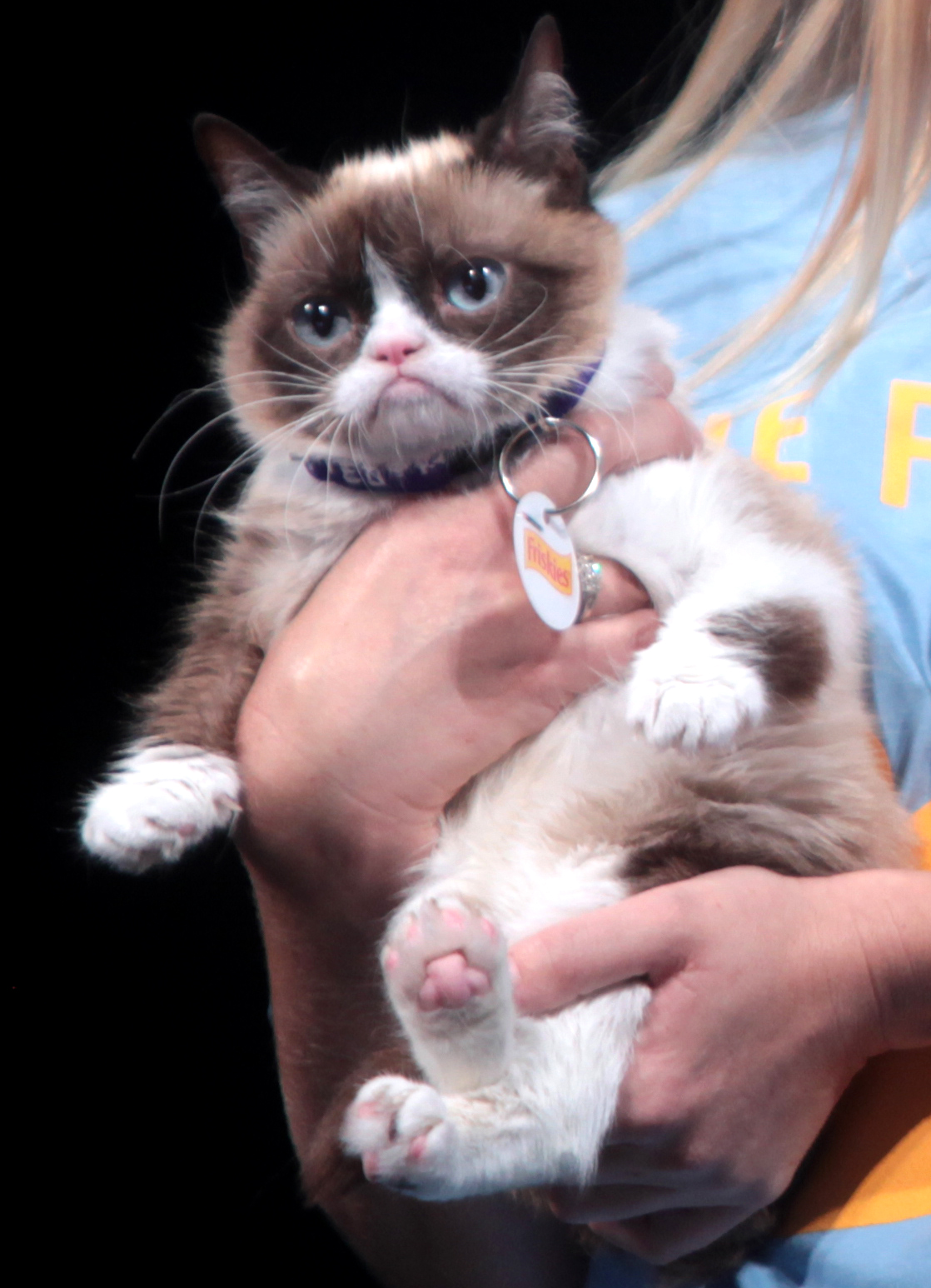
Grumpy Cat, who was ranked as the world's richest cat

- Cole and Marmalade, a group of cats used for entertainment and educational purposes on cats.
- Grumpy Cat (US, real name Tardar Sauce), an Internet celebrity known for her grumpy facial expression; died in 2019.
- Henri, le Chat Noir, an internet film noir "existentialist" cat.
- Jorts and Jean, cats in a viral 2021 Reddit post who became organized labor advocates on Twitter.
- Keyboard Cat (real name Fatso, replaced by Bento, then Skinny), whose paws were manipulated so it seems he was playing a musical keyboard.
- Kkongkkong (South Korea), the subject of an internet meme due to a viral news broadcast
- Lil Bub (US), star of Lil Bub & Friendz
- Longcat (Japan, real name Shiro), who became the subject of an Internet meme due to her length
- Maru (Japan), internet celebrity famous for his love of boxes.
- Smudge (Canada), also known as "Table Cat", who became part of the woman yelling at a cat Internet meme in 2019. The meme consisted of a screencap of a woman pointing angrily from The Real Housewives of Beverly Hills paired with a picture of Smudge at a dining table, seemingly looking confused.
- Sockington (US), a cat famous for his posts on Twitter.
- Tara (US), a family cat from Bakersfield, California, who saved a four-year-old boy from a dog attack in 2014, and became a "viral Internet sensation" when household surveillance footage was published.
- Tater Tot, a disabled orange kitten with "several malformations" including a cleft palate and "completely curly" legs. Became famous in 2023, for his mismatched splints and grumpy expression, Tater Tot died suddenly only weeks after making headlines for being a "tiny inspiration".
- Zoe the Cat, PhD, a cat accredited by the American Psychotherapy Association, as part of a commentary about the state of accreditation within the industry by Dr. Steve Eichel.

=== In film and television ===
- Morris the Cat, the advertising mascot for 9Lives brand cat food.
- Orangey, animal actor which appeared in Breakfast at Tiffany's and other movies.
- Palmer the Cat, acted the part of Leo Kohlmeyer in the 1986 film The Richest Cat in the World.
- Tsim Tung Brother Cream, was a cat who lived in a convenience store in Hong Kong. He has appeared in a book, and in advertising and on TV programs.

=== In literature ===
- Catarina (alternatively spelled Cattarina), Edgar Allan Poe's pet cat and the inspiration for his story "The Black Cat".
- Dewey Readmore Books, the library cat from Spencer, Iowa. Born Nov 1987; abandoned at the Library in January 1988; died (euthanized) December 2006. Subject of a best-selling 2008 book, Dewey: The Small-Town Library Cat Who Touched the World
- Henrietta, the now-deceased cat of New York Times foreign correspondent Christopher S. Wren, made famous by the book, The Cat Who Covered the World.
- Hodge, Dr. Samuel Johnson's favourite cat, famously recorded in James Boswell's 1791 Life of Johnson, as shedding light on his owner's character.
- Homer (1997–2013), blind cat and the subject of Homer's Odyssey, famous for saving his owner from a burglar.
- Jeoffry, the visionary poet Christopher Smart's cat, who is praised as "surpassing in beauty" in his owner's poem "Jubilate Agno". (Jeoffry was Smart's only companion during his confinement in an asylum in 1762–63.) The Jeoffry extract is set as a treble solo in the festival cantata, Rejoice in the Lamb Op 30, by Benjamin Britten.

=== In music ===
- Delilah, a female calico cat belonging to Freddie Mercury; Mercury paid tribute to her on the Queen album Innuendo.

=== World record holders ===
- Colonel Meow, a Himalayan-Persian mix who became famous on social media websites for his extremely long fur and scowling face. As of 2014, he holds the Guinness world record for longest hair on a cat (nine inches). Died 2014.
- Creme Puff (1967–2005), Guinness World Records verified longest-lived cat, at just over 38 years; owned by Jake Perry of Austin, Texas
- Flossie, Guinness World Records verified oldest cat alive (as of December 2025); born in 1995; owned by Victoria Green of Orpington, England.
- Nala Cat, a slightly cross-eyed Siamese-tabby mix. With 4.3 million followers on Instagram and her own brand of cat food, her value was estimated to be $100 million in 2022, making her the richest cat in the world at that time.
- Prince Chunk, a shorthair cat alleged to weigh forty-four pounds (two pounds short of the world record).
- Stewie, Guinness World Record holder for world's longest domestic cat from August 2010 until his death on 4 February 2013.
- Towser "The Mouser" (1963–1987) of Glenturret Distillery in Crieff, Scotland, holds the Guinness World Record for the most mice caught (28,899).

=== On ships ===
- Mrs Chippy of Endurance, cat on the Ernest Shackleton expedition.
- Nansen of Belgica, the ship's cat on board during the Belgian Antarctic Expedition 1897–99.
- Simon, celebrated ship's cat of HMS Amethyst. In addition to being presented with multiple medals, he was the only cat to have won the PDSA's Dickin Medal, for his rat-catching and morale-boosting activities during the Yangtze Incident in 1949. He also received the rank of "Able Seacat".
- Trim of HMS Reliance, and HMS Investigator, the first cat to circumnavigate Australia. Companion of Matthew Flinders.
- Unsinkable Sam of the German battleship Bismarck, HMS Cossack, and HMS Ark Royal. All three ships were torpedoed, but Sam survived each sinking and retired to a home on dry land. The most famous mascot of the British Royal Navy.

=== Railways ===
- Tama, a calico cat who was the station master at Kinokawa, Wakayama railway station, Wakayama Prefecture, Japan from 2007 to 2015.
- Chessie, the mascot of the Chesapeake and Ohio Railway

=== Mascots ===
- Algonquin Hotel cats named Hamlet and Matilda, resident cats of the Algonquin Hotel in New York City. The Algonquin was for many years home to the Algonquin Round Table, consisting of such American wits as Dorothy Parker, Alexander Woollcott, and Harpo Marx. There have been nine cats who have called the Algonquin their home since the 1930s, but not all have been female. All the males have been named Hamlet (in deference to the actor John Barrymore), and the females Matilda.
- Şero, the political mascot of the Turkish Republican People's Party (CHP), who resided in the party's headquarters in Ankara until his death in September 2024.
- Smudge, "employed" for many years at the People's Palace, Glasgow, and a trade union member as a result.

== Cats of famous people ==
- Asya, the pet of linguist Yuri Knorozov. He consistently listed her as a co-author on his papers, although editors would remove this, and he used an author photograph featuring her and would be upset if this was cropped. Asya is depicted in a monument to Knorozov in Mérida, Yucatan, commemorating his work on Mayan languages.
- Bimbo, the cat belonging to archbishop Makarios III during his year in exile in the Seychelles.
- Choupette, the pet and muse of designer Karl Lagerfeld.
- F.D.C. Willard, the pen name of Chester, the cat of Jack H. Hetherington, who listed the cat as co-author of several physics papers from 1975 to 1980.
- Foss, belonging to Edward Lear; subject of many drawings, some published in The Heraldic Blazon of Foss the Cat; inspired The Owl & the Pussycat; Lear buried Foss in his garden and died himself only two months later

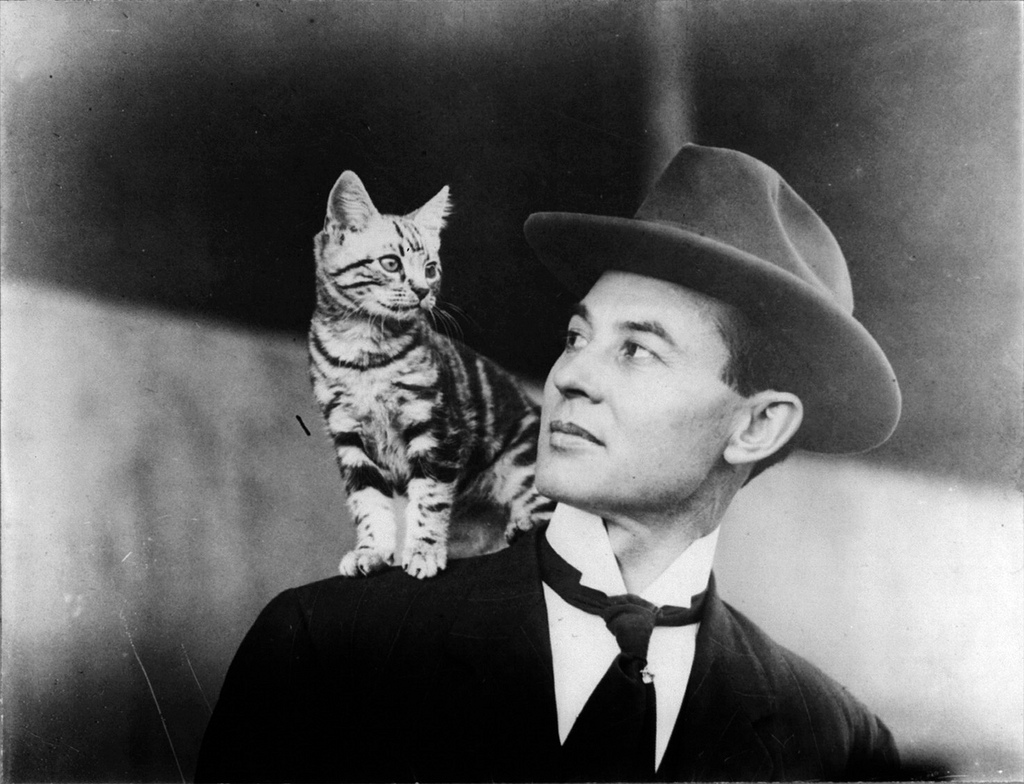
John Moisant and Mademoiselle Fifi, 1910

- Mademoiselle Fifi, (aka Paree) the cat of American aviator John Moisant. Fifi accompanied Moisant during the first aeroplane flight from London-to-Paris on 23 August 1910. After Moisant was killed at New Orleans in December 1910, a photo was published of Fifi attending Moisant's funeral, draped in mourning cover.
- Olivia Benson, a Scottish Fold belonging to Taylor Swift. Olivia Benson's worth was estimated to be $97 million in 2023, making her the third-richest pet in the world.
- Snacks, belonging to Bethany Cosentino of Best Coast. Snacks was featured on the cover of the band's debut album Crazy for You, and Snacks and Cosentino were featured together in a PETA ad campaign.
- Sprite, belonging to Bill Watterson, creator of Calvin and Hobbes; she was an inspiration for some of Hobbes' physical features and behaviors, such as his habit of pouncing on Calvin.

== See also ==
- Acoustic Kitty
- Cats and the Internet
- Dickin Medal, recipients includes only one cat
- List of animals awarded human credentials
- List of cat breeds
- List of fictional cats
- List of individual dogs
- List of longest-living cats
- List of wealthiest animals
