= Michy =

Michy is a given name and surname. People with this name include:

- Claude Michy (born 1949), French football investor
- Michy Batshuayi (born 1993), Belgian football striker
- Michelle "Michy" Lemmens, singer for Dutch Eurodance musical project Starstylers

== See also ==
- Michelle (name), of which Michy is sometimes a hypocorism
- Michi (disambiguation)
