= Jorts (cat) =

Office pet featured in labor activism

- Species: Felis catus
- Breed: Domestic shorthair, orange tabby
- Sex: Male (neutered)
- Born: May 1
- Occupation: Office pet
- Known for: Door and trash can mishaps, involuntary application of margarine, "pro-labor icon"

Jorts is an orange tabby cat that initially rose to internet fame in December 2021 in a viral Reddit thread discussing purported workplace attempts to train him that included him being smeared with margarine. A Twitter account personifying Jorts (and his fellow workplace cat Jean) as a supporter of organized labor has since received recognition.

== Description and early life ==
Jorts is an orange tabby cat. He was a stray in his early years before being taken in by office workers. After being known to forage for food in dumpsters, the office workers, who already had a cat named Jean, provided care to Jorts.

== Office events ==
Jorts (and Jean)
(@JortsTheCat)
tweeted:

Maybe what you like about us isn't just helper Jean, or buttered Jorts. Maybe you like the story because you agree everyone's special contributions should be valued and that we are all just great exactly as we are.

December 15, 2021

Jorts is described by the Reddit thread as being unable to perform common daily tasks such as opening doors, whereas Jean is described as a comparatively smart cat who helps Jorts.

According to the post, to prevent Jorts from being trapped behind doors, staff in the office space purchased a doorstop. Another staff member, alias "Pam", objected to this. Pam then compiled a list of training tasks for Jorts in the office, which was met with disagreement by other staff, who said that Jorts would not learn due to his low intellect. When a member of the office staff asserted that "you can't expect Jean's tortoiseshell smarts from orange cat Jorts", Pam stated that this was "perpetuating ethnic stereotypes by saying orange cats are dumb". Pam reportedly requested racial sensitivity training before agreeing to return to work. "Jorts", "Jean", and "Pam" were stated to be pseudonyms to preserve the anonymity of the workforce. Later, Jorts's Twitter account stated that Jorts and Jean were the cats' real names.

According to an update on Reddit by the original poster, the events led to the involvement of human resources management at the workplace. Discussions with human resources led to the discovery that Pam had been applying margarine to Jorts in an attempt to motivate him to groom himself more effectively. These events were anonymously posted in December 2021 to Reddit's "Am I the Asshole" subreddit. An agreement was ultimately reached to resolve the dispute. In January 2022, critique linking Jorts' lack of intelligence and apparent poor life skills to the color of his coat was refuted by the chief medical officer of the San Diego Humane Society.

== Twitter advocacy ==
Jorts (and Jean)
(@JortsTheCat)
tweeted:

Nobody does anything great alone. What if the person to invent that next tweak forward can't afford to go to school, or can't afford to just sit and think about smart stuff? What if they have a toothache that day, and can't afford to see a dentist?

What if we invested in that?

January 22, 2022

The popularity of the Reddit thread discussing these office events led to the creation of a Twitter account that shares updates about the activities of Jorts (and Jean). As of March 2022, the Twitter account had 170,000 followers.

The Twitter account regularly posts pro-trade union messages, winning praise from cartoonist Tom Tomorrow, Senator Elizabeth Warren, and labor movement figures, including Liz Shuler, Lorena Gonzalez Fletcher, and the United Farm Workers. Jorts' labor advocacy has been compared to Scabby the Rat, the giant inflatable rodents that have been used to draw public attention to strikes for decades. Other messages from the Twitter account promote public investment in education and public health. In addition, the account advocates for inclusive technology and policies, such as the alt attribute used to display text in lieu of an image for screen reader software, and protection of transgender people.

Public requests to create Jorts merchandise were rejected by the Twitter account. Instead, the account has encouraged followers to adopt cats from pet shelters, donate to a strike fund, or customize existing clothing with the phrase "I LIKE JORTS THE CAT".

== In popular culture ==
A mod of the video game Stardew Valley was made featuring Jorts and fellow office cat Jean as non-player characters.

== See also ==
- Cats and the Internet
- List of individual cats
