= Rusik =

Russian police sniffer cat

Rusik was the first Russian police sniffer cat in Stavropol, a city near the Caspian Sea. He made an important contribution in the search for hidden illegal cargoes of sturgeon fish, an endangered species, and caviar.

Rusik began his sniffing career when he first appeared at a police checkpoint in 2002. Following his adoption by the staff, Rusik demonstrated his ability to sniff out sturgeon-smugglers' stashes with accuracy. His talent for sniffing out poached fish soon found him taking over the job of the police's canine team member.

Rusik died in the line of duty in June 2003, when he was hit by a car during an inspection, immediately after searching a bus. He had apparently found smuggled sturgeon in the same car some time before, according to personnel at the police checkpoint. Some local sources expressed their belief that Rusik was the object of a contract killing, but this is highly unlikely. Rusik was a tabby with only a year's service at the time of his death.

== See also ==
- List of individual cats
