= Lewis (cat) =

Cat who gained media attention for being placed under house arrest

- Lewis with his owner, Ruth Cisero
- Species: Cat
- Breed: Mixed
- Born: Fairfield, Connecticut, U.S.
- Owner: Ruth Cisero
- Criminal information
- Status: Confined to owner's home
- Criminal charges: Reckless endangerment (owner)
- Penalty: House arrest

Lewis is the name of a cat from Fairfield, Connecticut, who garnered mass media attention for being placed under house arrest in March 2006. At the time of his arrest Lewis was five years old, placing his birthdate between the years 2000 and 2001.

== Background ==
Lewis is a polydactyl, domestic long-haired cat. Several of Fairfield's Sunset Circle residents, along with an Avon saleswoman, have accused the cat of attacking them. There were witnesses to some of the incidents who stated the attacks were unprovoked. Janet Kettman of Sunset Circle who was allegedly attacked twice by the cat even picked Lewis out of a line-up of black and white cats. Animal Control Officer Rachel Solveira placed a restraining order on Lewis. It was the first time such an action was taken against a cat in the United States. Lewis was ordered to be placed under house arrest, and his owner tried medicating Lewis with Prozac but could not contain the cat in the house.

Ruth Cisero, Lewis's owner, was arrested and charged with failure to comply with a restraint order which the prosecuting attorney later changed to reckless endangerment. Cisero appeared in Bridgeport Superior Court at the end of April 2006. Cisero could have agreed to probation on the condition that Lewis be euthanized, a special probation offer with conditions made at the insistence of one woman that Lewis allegedly attacked on February 20. In a letter to prosecutors, she said she would only agree to probation for Cisero if the cat were put to death. Cisero instead opted to go to trial to try to preserve Lewis' life. Cisero appeared in court on May 23, 2006, on a second degree reckless endangerment charge.

Cisero stated that if the court ordered Lewis to be executed, she would move, as she would rather leave Fairfield than have her cat be killed. She further stated that she believed that Lewis may have been acting in self-defence, saying that "One day he came home covered in eggs because someone had egged him and another time a woman sprayed him with a hose. They have been tormenting this poor animal."

== Outcome ==
A hearing was set for June 20, 2006, to determine whether Cisero could get special probation and have her cat's life spared. The outcome was that Lewis had to remain inside his owner's home at all times, the sole exception being when Lewis is taken to a vet, though he must remain in a cage while outside. Ruth Cisero, Lewis's owner, was granted accelerated rehabilitation, which would result in her record being expunged if she successfully completed two years of probation.

A Utah animal sanctuary, Best Friends Animal Society, offered to take the cat if he were to be executed, but G.V. Riccio, Cisero's attorney, said Lewis enjoys life in southern New England and wants to stay.

In July 2008, the judge dismissed the reckless endangerment charge against Cisero, concluding she had met terms of a special probation for first-time offenders. Lewis is now an indoor pet, allowed outside only in a cat carrier.

== See also ==
- Animal trial
- List of individual cats

== List of News Reports ==
- Associated Press - Conn. crazy cat case heads to trial

=== Television ===
==== National ====
- MSNBC - AP - Crazy cat mends ways under house arrest
- CBS News - Conn. Crazy Cat Case Heads to Trial
- FOX News - Crazy Cat Terrorizes Connecticut Town
- MSNBC - House arrest for attack cat
- MSNBC - The Situation with Tucker Carlson for March 29 - House arrest for attack cat
- MSNBC - Countdown with Keith Olberman March 29, 2006

==== Local ====
- NBC30 - Fairfield's Lewis The Cat Case Going To Trial (Connecticut)
- WCBS - Lewis The Cat In Hot Water After Alleged Attacks (New York, Tri State Area)
- WNBS - Owner Opts For Trial, Rather Than Death For Cat (New York, Tri State Area)
- WCCC - Conn. Crazy Cat Case Heads to Trial (Minnesota, Minneapolis/St. Paul)
- WFSB - Lewis the Cat's Fate Pending (Connecticut)
- WRAL - Conn. Crazy Cat Case Heads To Trial (North Carolina, Raleigh-Durham & Fayetteville)
- WTNH - Cat case going to trial (Connecticut)

=== Radio ===
- WICC - The Brian Smith Radio Show - May 2, 2006 - Lewis the Cat (Connecticut, Bridgeport)
- BBC - 'Asbo cat' terrifies US town (Radio, International)

=== Internet ===
- SFGate.com - Conn. Crazy Cat Case Heads to Trial (California, San Francisco)

=== Print news ===
- Connecticut Post Lewis set for day in court
- Boston Globe - Conn. crazy cat case heads to trial
- Connecticut Post - Nation obsessed with cat
- Connecticut Post - Lewis gets a MySpace
- Hartford Courant - Conn. Crazy Cat Case Heads to Trial
- New York Times - For an Aggressive Pet, It's Kitty, Bar the Door
- USA Today - Think your cat's tough? Try the 'terrorist of Sunset Circle'
