= Gacek =

Famous cat in Poland

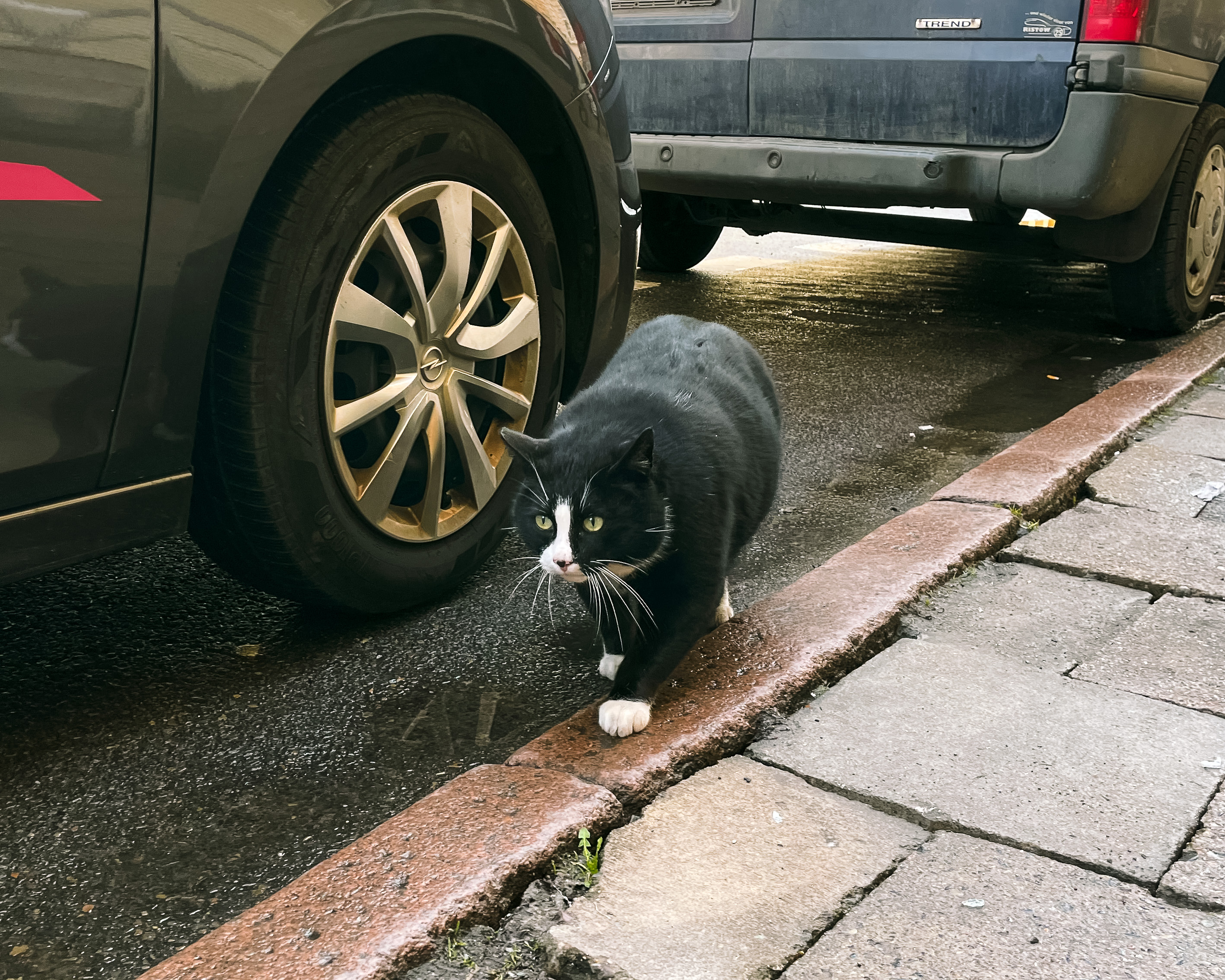
- Gacek in 2023.
- Species: Felis catus
- Sex: Male
- Born: c. 2013; Szczecin
- Nationality: Polish
- Known for: Szczecin's tourist attraction

Gacek (Polish: [ˈɡat͡sɛk]; born c. 2013) is a male domestic cat with tuxedo fur. Between 2020 and 2023, this homeless cat was a tourist attraction in Szczecin, Poland. In 2020, a video of Gacek was distributed around the world on social media. Tourists came to see Gacek in his usual location on Kaszubska Street. He became over-fed, suffering obesity related conditions. Gacek was rescued by an animal shelter and recovered his health.

== Popularity ==
Local residents recall first seeing Gacek on Kaszubska street in the town centre in about 2013. A wooden booth was built there to give him shelter. In 2020, a German tourist uploaded a video of Gacek to YouTube. The video was shared to millions of viewers around the world.

The international news media reported Gacek's popularity. Reuters called Gacek the "Kim Kardashian of the cat world", because many Gacek-themed merchandise appeared for sale on the street.

On 20 March 2023, someone tried to grab Gacek but the cat escaped and the person fled.

The Polish Institute for Animal Care (Towarzystwo Opieki nad Zwierzętami w Polsce), TOZ, admitted Gacek for care in April 2023. Gacek was 10 kg, about 4 kg overweight (about twice his expected size). He also had gingivitis and arthritis. Gacek was treated under the care of a veterinarian. Gacek recovered and was rehomed.

Controversy arose amongst fans of Gacek when Google Maps removed reviews of the cat's location. The Straits Times reported allegations that Gacek had stolen a sausage and scratched a person's forearm.

== Legacy ==
An online fundraising campaign in 2023 named "Gacek buys food for the homeless" secured over 9,500 Złoty for the care of homeless animals. In 2024, the Szczecin government proposed a 180,000 Złoty project to commemorate Gacek which would include a monument, information boards and the neutering of 500 stray cats.

The Kawiarnia Fundacji Kota Gacka (Gacek the Cat's Foundation Café) opened on 13 December 2024. It aims to educate the public about cat care and rehome stray cats. In 2025, a large mural depicting him was installed on Rugiańska Street, Szczecin.

== See also ==
- List of individual cats
