= Cole and Marmalade =

YouTube celebrity cat duo

- Marmalade (left) and Cole (right)
- Species: House cats
- Breed: Turkish Angora? (Cole); domestic shorthair (Marmalade)
- Sex: Male (both)
- Born: c. March 1, 2012 (Cole); July 13, 2013 (Marmalade); Pasco County, Florida, United States
- Died: October 10, 2021 (Cole, aged 9); October 10, 2026 (Marmalade, aged 13)
- Owners: Chris Poole, Jessica Josephs
- Residence: Tampa, Florida, United States
- coleandmarmalade.com

Cole (c. March 1, 2012 – October 10, 2021) and Marmalade (July 13, 2013 – October 10, 2026) were two Internet celebrity cats that lived in Tampa, Florida under the ownership of the married couple Chris Poole and Jessica Josephs. Cole, a black cat of possibly a Turkish Angora breed, was found abandoned and flea-ridden on roadside in 2012 by a friend of the couple, who then allowed them to adopt him. Poole and Josephs raised Cole and uploaded their first video of them playing with their cat the same year on YouTube, resulting in a high number of views. Afterward, they uploaded multiple videos of Cole on YouTube for entertainment purposes and, in certain entries, to educate and persuade audiences on paying greater attention to shelter cats and adopting them. In 2013, the couple adopted Marmalade, a ginger tabby domestic shorthair cat that quickly got along with Cole and frequently played with him. Poole and Josephs quit their jobs within the mid-2010s to commit full time towards recording Cole, Marmalade, and other adopted cats like Jugg and Zig Zag for multiple of their social media accounts, which gained millions of followers. Their social media accounts were shut down under a lawsuit event in 2020 from their sponsoring company, who accused Poole of breaching their contracts for funds and merchandise sales and demanded reparations and full control of the website for Cole and Marmalade. All involved actors eventually agreed to a confidential settlement the same year, giving back control of the official website and the social media accounts to Cole and Marmalade's owners.

In 2014, Marmalade tested positive for feline immunodeficiency virus (FIV) and suffered from a cancer called lymphoma as a result. After undergoing surgery and chemotherapy, he was cured of his cancer the following year in 2015 but lived with FIV for the rest of his life. Poole and Josephs used the online popularities of Cole and Marmalade to promote advocacy and activism for animal welfare, particularly for shelter animals. Poole said that he took pride in entertaining cat lovers with online contents of the cat duo but also ruled out in-person public appearances of them at outside events. Marmalade was the subject of Friskies Cat Video Awards' grand prize winner in 2014 and was featured in the front cover of a 2015 issue of Modern Cat Magazine after winning another contest. Cole and Marmalade died on October 10 of 2021 and 2026, respectively.

== Biographies ==
Cole, a black cat born in early 2012, was found alone by a friend of the married couple Chris Poole and Jessica Josephs at the side of a road in Pasco County, located in Florida. The friend later texted the couple a picture of the kitten, and Poole and Josephs agreed to adopting him the next day. At the time, Cole was 6 weeks old, weighed only 6 oz (170 g) and was infested with fleas. Upon taking the cat in, the two owners bottle-fed him, and Cole became closely bonded with them. The following year, on July 13, 2013, a ginger tabby kitten named Marmalade (nicknamed Marm) was born to a cat of different owners, although his two siblings had died. Poole and Josephs agreed to adopt Marmalade from their neighbors, who initially planned on leaving the kittens to a feral cat colony. After introducing Marmalade to Cole, the two acted as close companions and quickly played with each other. Marmalade is wide-eyed and was named after the jam placed on toasts. The owners said that Cole was probably a Turkish Angora breed while Marmalade was a domestic shorthair. Cole and Marmalade's owners, all residing in the Floridan city of Tampa, estimated the birth date of the former to have been roughly on March 1. Poole had previously moved to Florida in 2008 to work as a media producer for seven years at Big Cat Rescue, a non-profit animal sanctuary primarily for big cats that were previously abandoned or abused by its former owners.

On June 7, 2012, Poole posted on YouTube the first video on their channel, which was of Josephs playing with Cole as a kitten; the video quickly generated more than 100,000 views. When Poole learned that black cats were most vulnerable to not getting adopted and instead being euthanized in animal shelters, he posted another video called "10 Reasons To Adopt a Lucky Black Cat" on May 25, 2013. From there, he decided on posting a mix of silly videos of his black cat along with educational videos that help shelters and promote spaying and neutering house cats and taking care of feral cats. The same year on November 13, the owners uploaded a video named "When Cole Met Marmalade...", which featured Cole first being introduced to Marmalade as a kitten; the video went viral and, as of 2018, had over 2.4 million views. The channel then featured many videos of Cole and Marmalade playing with their surroundings and the objects around them. Poole and Josephs also uploaded educational videos on cats alongside the silly videos of their cats. By 2016, the cat duo had 1.2 million followers on Facebook and 374,000 subscribers on YouTube. As of 2021, the YouTube channel had 1.4 million subscribers and the Facebook page over 2 million followers. Josephs is the primary editor and writer of ColeandMarmalade.com and had also set up both video and picture ideas and displayed props like cat costumes and castle models tailored for their cats. The couple had both left their jobs to work full time on recording videos and produce social media contents of their cats. Poole and Josephs in 2018 also adopted two female tortoiseshell cats named Jugg and Zig Zag, who coexisted with Cole and Marmalade. According to Poole, Marmalade liked to destroy Christmas decorations by climbing on and eating them, resulting in the props being replaced with gingerbread houses for the holidays. Cole was described by his owners as handsome, loving to walk outside, a "snuggle bug", and clever to the point that he was able to outsmart them in games of hide and seek whereas Marmalade was noted as feisty.

In 2014, Marmalade was diagnosed with feline immunodeficiency virus (FIV), which caused him to receive a white blood cell cancer called lymphoma. He had previously tested negative for FIV, which seemingly meant that the cat was infected by it at a later point in time. Marmalade underwent a series of diagnostics along with a surgery operation for a stomach tumor and 15 rounds of chemotherapy, which costed thousands of dollars. Marmalade was cured of his cancer in 2015 but since lived with FIV. In 2018, the cats' owners uploaded an educational video on adopting cats that test positive on FIV.

Poole revealed that he did not intend to have become an online influencer in his early years but, along with his game, used their cats' fame for fellow felines to be adopted rather than bought as forms of advocacy for them and animal welfare. The popularity of their social media presence resulted in cat brands, who offered sponsorship deals to them. Poole confirmed that he and his wife were selective over the brands based on whether they aligned with their personal values. He also stated that Cole and Marmalade were both ultimately regular cats but that he was proud that people could relate to the videos of the cats and "blending fun and silly with educational posts" for awareness and activism of shelter animals. In another interview, he said that he and his wife were to never plan on taking Cole and Marmalade outside for any guest appearances, especially due to the stress risks to the cats. Poole in 2014 won the $25,000 grand prize for the Friskies Cat Video Awards from his submitted video featuring Marmalade called "Dumpster Kitty". Marmalade in 2015 won the Star Cat contest under Modern Cat Magazine, where he was featured in the cover for the spring/summer 2015 issue. Cole and Marmalade were featured in the The Ellen DeGeneres Show.

=== Lawsuit and shutdowns ===
In March 2020, the YouTube, Facebook, Instagram, and Twitter accounts of Cole and Marmalade were all deactivated due to a lawsuit from Digital Pet Media, which claimed to have owned the digital business of the cats. Poole had previously made a business deal with Edward Holden and Stephen Watters to found Digital Pet Media and start merchandise sales from coleandmarmalade.com. The company accused Poole of breaking the contract by locking them out of the social media accounts, demanding that he give up control of the website and the equipment used to make the videos along with covering other fees. Poole then filed his own lawsuit against them, accusing Watters of claiming a 40% "management fee" for himself. He launched a GoFundMe campaign requesting $100,000 on March 7 to cover the legal defense funds and wrote that he was wrong to believe that the businessmen were aligned with him on educating and entertaining cat lovers. Digital Pet Media claimed to have lost $2,500 a day for the shutdown and wanted Poole to cover the losses. Poole and Josephs raised $184,016 from the GoFundMe campaign as a defense fund and had used nearly all of the money for both the original lawsuit and a copyright suit. In August, the lawsuit resulted in a confidential settlement and a restoration of the couple's ownership of the accounts and rights to post photos of their cats online; Poole and Josephs created a new company named The Furtastic. Josephs stated that ultimately, everyone involved in the lawsuit wanted to "go their separate ways and move on". On August 26, the cat owners posted their first video since the lawsuit, announcing their return on YouTube.

=== Deaths ===
Cole's health deteriorated from a cancer that caused severe damage to his left kidney, resulting in his eventual death on October 10, 2021. Five years later on October 10, 2026, Marmalade died peacefully at home with his owners present.

== See also ==
- Cats and the Internet
- List of individual cats
