= Tara (cat) =

Cat from viral video (born 2008)

Zatara
- Species: Cat
- Sex: Female
- Born: Zatara (Tara for short); April 18, 2008 (age 18); Bakersfield, California, USA
- Known for: Rescuing her family's child from a dog's attack
- Title: The Hero Cat
- Owner: The Triantafilo family
- Appearance: Tabby cat
- Awards: Cat Hero Award; Special Award For Cat Achievement; Blue Tiger Award; "Hero Dog" award; Chonky award

Zatara (Tara for short), is a female tabby cat who rose to international fame in May 2014 when she stopped a dog attack against her owners' four-year-old son in Bakersfield, California, United States. When a neighbor's dog attacked and bit the child, the cat leapt at the dog, causing it to stop biting and run away. The moment was recorded on household surveillance. After the footage was uploaded on YouTube, it received more than 16.8 million views in the first 48 hours.

== Family pet ==
The cat joined the Triantafilo family in 2008 after it followed parents, Roger and Erica Triantafilo, home. They named her Tara because it was the pet form of 'Zatara'; the name smugglers gave to Edmond Dantès in The Count of Monte Cristo. The smugglers said it meant driftwood.

== Dog attack ==
On May 13, 2014, Jeremy Triantafilo, a four-year-old boy, was riding his bicycle in his family's driveway in Bakersfield, California when Scrappy, a neighbor's eight-month-old Labrador-Chow mix, came from behind and bit his leg. As the dog began dragging Jeremy down his driveway, Tara, who the family states was very attached to Jeremy, tackled the dog and chased him away before returning to Jeremy's side to check on him.

Jeremy needed ten stitches in his left calf following the attack. He quickly recovered and was thankful for Tara's actions calling her "my hero".

== Awards and commendations ==
A few days later, minor league baseball team Bakersfield Blaze invited the cat, assisted by Jeremy's family, to throw the first pitch at a Bakersfield minor league baseball game in Sam Lynn Ballpark as a recognition for her deed. In the same spirit, Cat Fanciers' Association announced Tara as the recipient of its first-ever Cat Hero Award.

- On June 3, 2014, the Bakersfield Board of Supervisors proclaimed June 3 Tara the Hero Cat Day.
- On August 15, 2014, Tara was awarded the Special Award For Cat Achievement by the Cat Vid Festival.
- On September 26, 2014, Tara was awarded the Blue Tiger Award; an award only awarded to military service dogs.
- Tara became the first non-human to be named the grand marshal for Bakersfield's Christmas parade in 2014.
- On June 19, 2015, Tara was awarded with the Los Angeles SPCA's "Hero Dog" award, for which she also won a year's supply of cat food.
- On New Year's Day, 2018, Tara and her family rode in the Rose Parade on the Lucy Pet Foundation Paws for Life float honoring heroic animals.

== Aftermath ==
The eight-month-old Labrador-Chow mix Scrappy was surrendered by its owners to the City of Bakersfield Animal Care Center on May 13. It then began a mandatory ten-day quarantine period to determine whether the animal had rabies.

After the video of Tara went viral, websites and online petitions called for the dog not to be put down. Animal Care Center director Julie Johnson said they were also flooded with phone calls asking for the dog to be saved. However, based on observations in the kennel during the quarantine period, the dog remained classified as "vicious" and "dangerous"; all requests for adoption were denied.

Following the mandatory ten-day quarantine period, the Animal Care Center announced that Scrappy "was humanely euthanized over the weekend" of May 24, 2014.

== See also ==
- List of individual cats
- Cats and the Internet
