= Hamish McHamish =

Ginger cat from St Andrews, Scotland

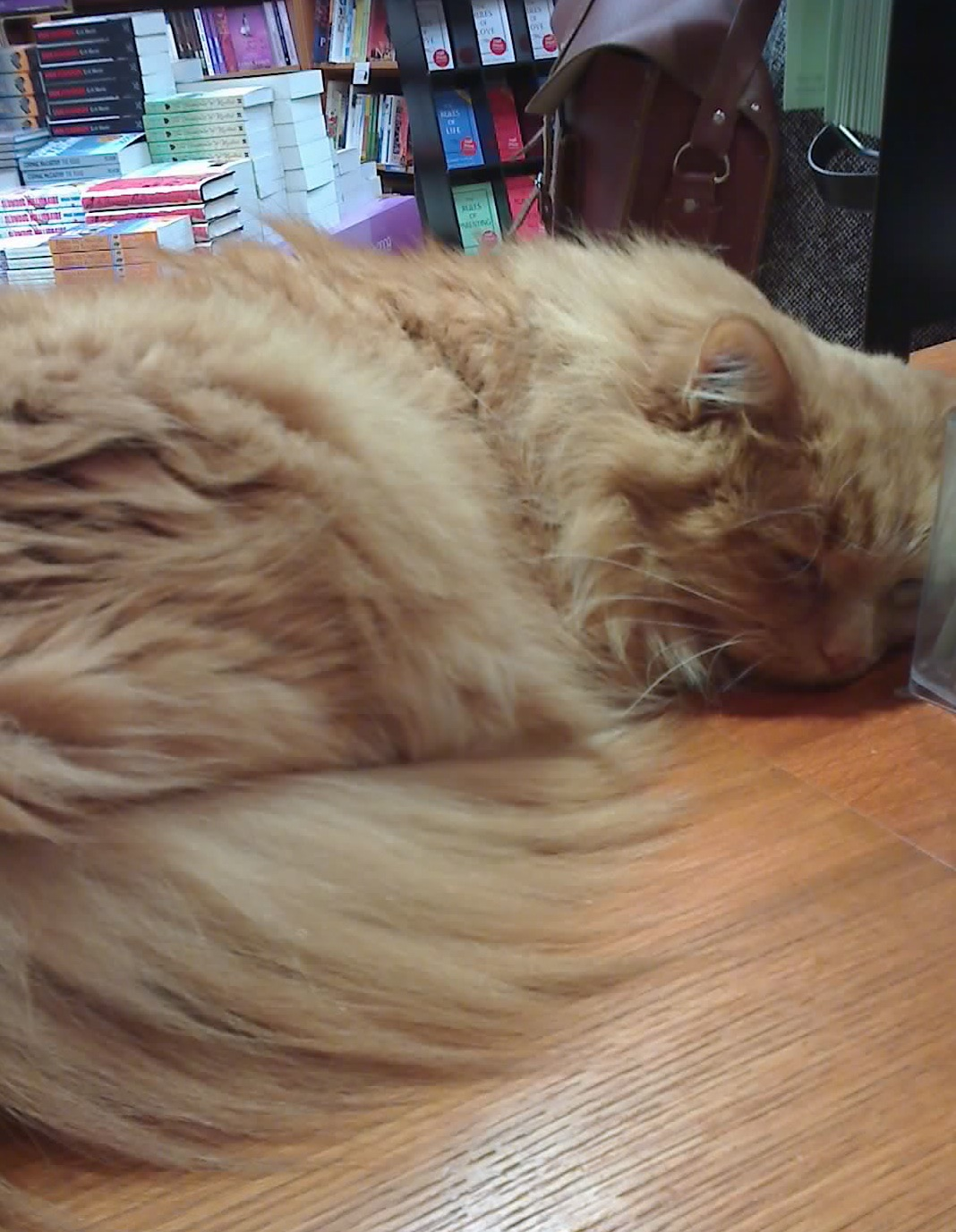
- Hamish at Waterstones bookshop in St Andrews
- Species: Felis catus
- Sex: Male
- Born: 1999 (exact date unknown, though prior to or on 11 September)
- Died: 11 September 2014 (aged 15); St Andrews, Fife, Scotland
- Nationality: Scotland
- Owner: Marianne Baird
- Appearance: Ginger and white, green eyes

Hamish McHamish (1999 – 11 September 2014) was a ginger cat who lived in the town of St Andrews, Fife, Scotland. He came to national and international prominence after the publication of a book entitled Hamish McHamish of St Andrews: Cool Cat About Town.

Hamish built up a following on social media, with a dedicated Facebook page and Twitter account set up by fans.

== Early life ==
Hamish was born in 1999 and was initially owned by Marianne Baird, a retired BBC producer, with whom he lived during his first year. During this time he became increasingly nomadic, often spending days away from home, being fed and watered at various homes in the town. He was known to spend most of his time in and around the houses and businesses on South Street, St Andrews, close to his original home.

Throughout Hamish's life, Ms. Baird cared for his well-being by ensuring he attended a veterinary surgeon every year for a health check and vaccinations.

== Rise to fame ==
Home to the University of St Andrews, St Andrews has a large population of tourists and students who had encountered Hamish throughout the years. Hamish had several regular spots where he spent his days. These were primarily local businesses near the Holy Trinity Church and Church Square in St Andrews. The creation of a Hamish McHamish Facebook profile, with in-character messages supposedly composed by the cat, raised his profile further; he had nearly 5,000 Facebook friends, and visitors to the town specifically sought him out to be photographed with him. A local bookshop had a "Hamish recommends" section, with cookbooks for fish and fiction featuring cats.

The interest created by visitors, students and townsfolk led to the publication of a book about his everyday activities. Hamish McHamish of St Andrews: Cool Cat About Town was written by Susan McMullan.

In January 2014, Hamish was chased by two dogs and escaped up a tree. He was helped to safety by university students and staff of a hairdressers he frequented to get his hair combed. This incident encouraged Jim Leishman, Provost of Fife, to ask dog owners to ensure their pets were kept on a lead while near Hamish.

He was featured on BBC television's The One Show, and his story also appeared in newspapers across the world.

== Statue ==
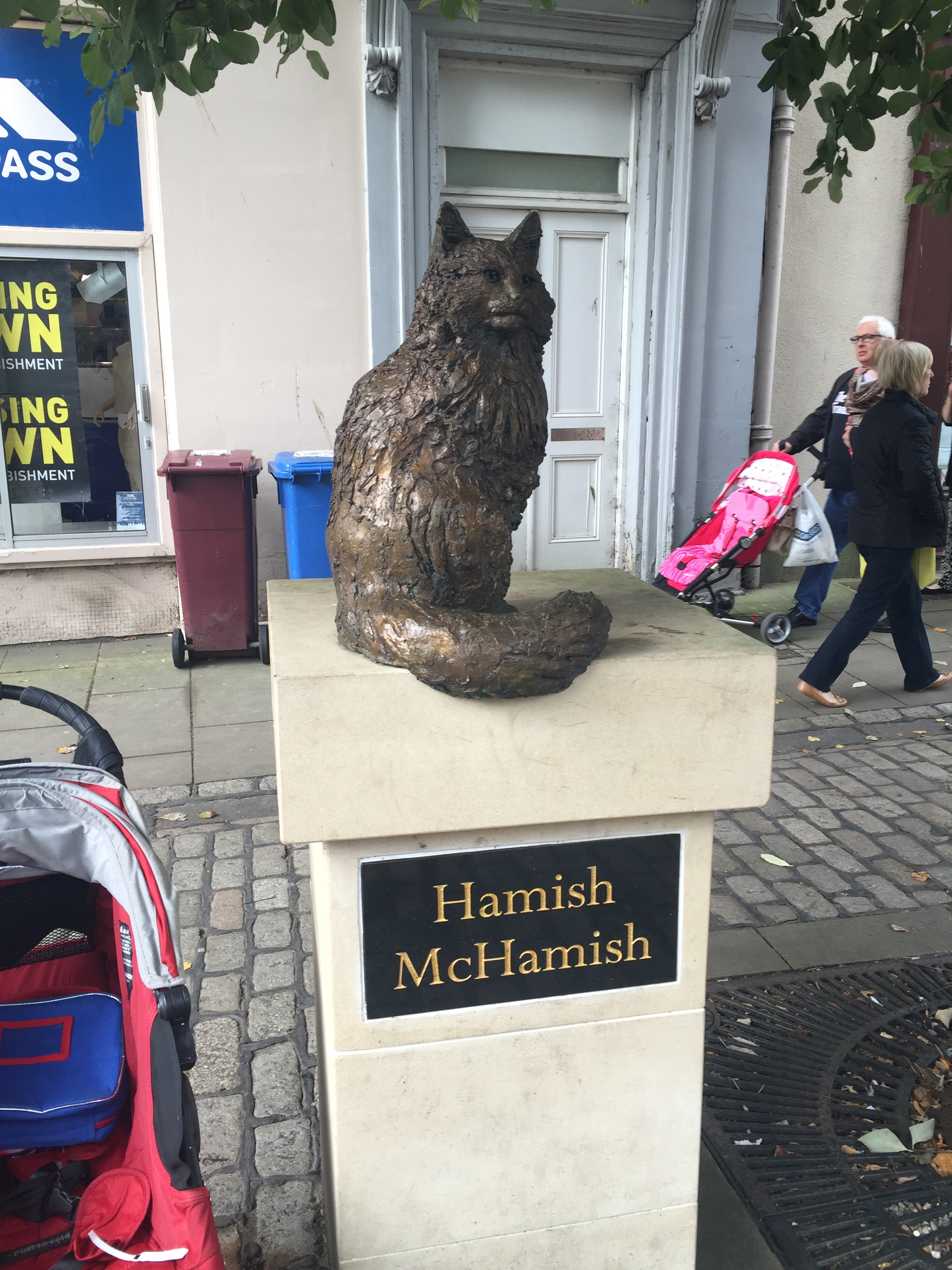
Hamish McHamish statue St Andrews

On 5 April 2014 a bronze statue of Hamish by David Annand was unveiled in Logies Lane by Jim Leishman. The funding for the statue was raised by a public donation campaign started by Flora Selwyn, the editor of St Andrews in Focus - a community magazine.

== Death ==
Hamish died on 11 September 2014. A statement on his Facebook group said:

In the end, the chest infection that he had been battling proved too much for him and the kindest thing to do was to let him go. Thank you, Hamish, for the years of joy you’ve given us and for letting us all be part of your life. May your remarkable spirit live on forever in the town you loved... and ruled! Here’s to you, old chum.

== Bibliography ==
- McMullan, Susan (2012). Hamish McHamish of St Andrews: Cool Cat About Town. Black and White Publishing. ISBN 978-1845025021.

== See also ==
- List of individual cats
