= Michi =

Michi may refer to:

== People ==
=== Given name ===
- Michi (Japanese singer) (born 1996), Japanese J-pop singer
- Michi (Dominican-American singer) (born 2002), pop-r&b singer-songwriter
- MiChi (born 1985), British singer
- Michi Atkins, former WNBA basketball player
- Michi Beck (born 1967), DJ and MC of the German hip hop group Die Fantastischen Vier
- Michi Gaigg (born 1957), Austrian violinist and conductor
- Michi Go (born 1988), South Korean singer-songwriter, rapper, record producer, entrepreneur and fashion icon
- Michi Goto (後藤 三知; born 1990), Japanese football player
- Michi Halilović (born 1983), German skeleton racer of Bosnian origin
- Michi Hayböck (born 1991), Austrian ski jumper
- Michi Himeno (姫野 美智; born 1956), Japanese animation artist and character designer
- Michi Itami (born 1938), visual artist
- Kawai Michi (河井 道; 1877–1953), Japanese educator, Christian activist, and proponent
- Michi Kobi (1924–2016), American actress
- Michi Matsuda (born 1868), Japanese educator
- Michi Meko (born 1974), American multidisciplinary artist
- Michi Muñoz (born 1981), Mexican-born American professional boxer
- Michi Nakanishi (中西 みち; 1913–1991), Japanese sprinter
- Michi Takahashi (高橋 ミチ; born 1963), Japanese teddy bear artist
- Michi Weglyn (1926–1999), author of the book Years of Infamy: The Untold Story of America’s Concentration Camps

=== Surname ===
- Maria Michi (1921–1980), Italian actress
- Orazio Michi (1594–1641), Italian composer

== Songs ==
- "Michi" (Exile song), 2007
- "Michi" (Chisato Moritaka song), 1990
- "Michi" (Hikaru Utada song), 2016

== Other uses ==
- Michi (cat), the pet cat of Julian Assange
- Michi, a Japanese-language reading of Dō (道, "way", refer to Dō)
  - Michi no Shiori, a Japanese religious text written by Oomoto founder Onisaburo Deguchi in 1905
- Michi, a 1986 film directed by Koreyoshi Kurahara
- Michi, a nickname of Mitsuzane Kureshima from Kamen Rider Gaim
