= Tuxedo Stan =

Cat who "ran for mayor" in Halifax, Nova Scotia

- Species: Cat
- Sex: Male
- Born: Tuxedo Stan c. 2010
- Died: September 9, 2013 (aged 3)
- Owners: Kathy Chisholm; Hugh Chisholm
- Parent: Greycie
- Appearance: Black-and-white tuxedo

Tuxedo Stan (c. 2010 – September 9, 2013) was a black and white cat who ran for mayor of Halifax, Nova Scotia, in the 2012 municipal elections. After the announcement of his candidacy, he achieved international attention and was endorsed by Ellen DeGeneres and Anderson Cooper.

== Political campaign ==
In 2012, a small group of friends created a political party ("The Tuxedo Party of Canada") to raise awareness of the growing feral cat population in Halifax. They created a Facebook group and announced Tuxedo Stan's candidacy for mayor of Halifax, Nova Scotia, in the 2012 municipal elections. Although he was unable to formally run because regulations required that candidates have a birth certificate, he quickly gained international attention and drew attention to local Trap–neuter–return efforts.

In the wake of his failed mayoral bid, the Halifax Regional Council voted to give $40,000 to the SPCA for a new vet clinic that will spay and neuter feral cats.

== Death ==
Tuxedo Stan was euthanized by his owners on September 9, 2013, after a battle with terminal cancer.

== See also ==
- List of individual cats
