= Woman yelling at a cat =

Internet meme

The picture pair central to the meme

Woman yelling at a cat is an Internet meme first used in a post by Twitter user @MISSINGEGIRL on May 1, 2019. It juxtaposes two images: on the left, a screen capture of "Malibu Beach Party from Hell", an episode from The Real Housewives of Beverly Hills, depicting cast member Taylor Armstrong crying and pointing (held back by Kyle Richards); and on the right, a picture uploaded to Tumblr in June 2018, depicting a cat from Ottawa, Ontario, Smudge, sitting at a dinner table behind a salad with a seemingly bemused expression.

== Images used ==
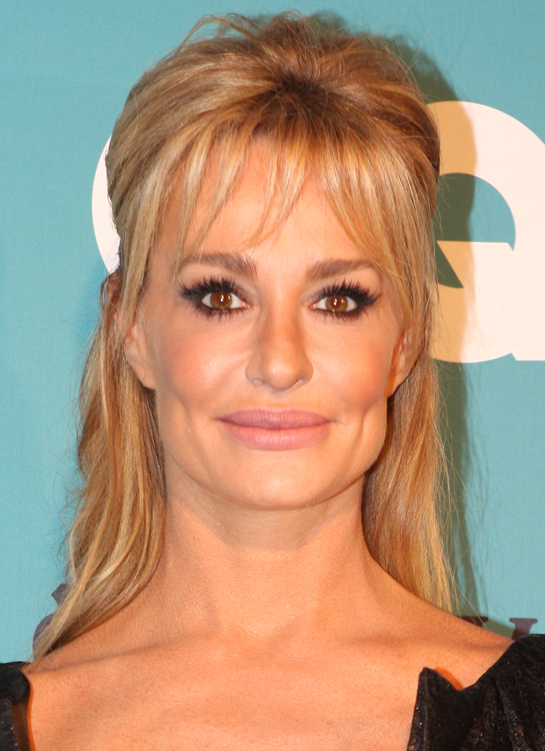
Taylor Armstrong in 2012. A screenshot of her in The Real Housewives of Beverly Hills serves as the meme's left image.

The image on the left of the meme image is a screenshot of "Malibu Beach Party From Hell", the 14th episode of the second season of The Real Housewives of Beverly Hills (2010–present); the episode, which aired on December 5, 2011, included a beach party which went awry when the housewives Taylor Armstrong and Camille Grammer feuded over the latter's gossip regarding Armstrong's former husband Russell, who died by suicide following what Armstrong claimed to be an abusive relationship. The still features the episode's most heated moment, where a tearful Armstrong screams and points at a partygoer she is arguing with while being held by Kyle Richards; it went viral following its inclusion on a Daily Mail article published a day after the episode's airing. Armstrong went on to work at domestic violence shelters and, in October 2019, said she was now in a more positive marriage.

The picture on the right of the meme image is of a cat from Ottawa, Ontario, named Smudge, whom Miranda Stillabower owned since 2015. According to Stillabower, he was very antisocial around humans at home, and disliked not having a chair to sit on when relatives filled up space at the dinner table. At one dinner in 2018, as a guest left his chair that had salad in front of it, the cat quickly took it over and had a seemingly confused expression on his face; as someone who took pictures of her pets and posted them on Tumblr, Stillabower shot a picture of the moment and uploaded it to the site in June 2018 with the caption "He no like vegetals". Although Stillabower had no expectations of her Tumblr post going viral, it nonetheless garnered 50,300 notes and reposts within a year, which Business Insider's Paige Leskin suggested was due to the caption's use of internet jargon.

== Popularity ==
The first incarnation of the "woman yelling at a cat" meme that used both images was a post by Twitter user @MISSINGEGIRL on May 1, 2019, with the caption "These photos together is making me lose it." In just more than three months, it was retweeted more than 78,000 times and garnered more than 275,000 likes. Although other Twitter users copied the meme with different captions, what surged the meme into massive notoriety was a Reddit post on June 2 by u/PerpetualWinter satirizing fans of the New York Knicks.

Some journalists, as well as Stillabower herself, attributed the popularity of "woman yelling at a cat" to its flexibility of use; subjects include daily scenarios such as encounters with spiders, relationship problems in connection to text messaging, someone noticing a relative masturbating to pornography, to debates such as violence in video games and word pronunciations. Occasionally, other memes are incorporated or characters in the meme are replaced with others.

The meme was represented in other formats, being used as Halloween costumes (one of which Armstrong responded to on Twitter) and for a sign at a September 2019 event in Guatemala protesting the San Rafael Mining Company. A recreation of the meme using a modded version of The Sims 4 was created by SimplySimmer19 and uploaded to Reddit in April 2020, garnering more than 42,000 upvotes within that month. More than a year after the meme's initial surge, Bruce Sterling recreated the meme in art styles unique to several periods; and Ochre Jelly, who has done Lego recreations of other memes, did one for "woman yelling at a cat", with the situation being about stepping on Lego bricks.

The meme turned Smudge into an internet personality, garnering an official website and a line of clothing, coffee mugs, and other merchandise based on him; 1.4 million followers on his Instagram account; and a "Smudgeposting" Facebook group that had 23,000 followers. The Instagram and the Smudgeposting numbers are as of December 2019. Content on Smudge's Instagram includes various types of post, such as him having the same expression as in the meme towards other foods such as nachos. Smudge's owners donated the money raised from t-shirt sales to the cat-rescuing non-profit Furry Tails. On Instagram, celebrities such as NFL linebacker Bruce Davis and WWE wrestler John Cena posted Smudge memes, as well as pictures of themselves wearing shirts of the cat; rapper Snoop Dogg also showed appreciation for the meme.

The meme has been used by notable individuals and institutions. NFL's Stefon Diggs, during an interview, wore cleats with the meme on it. Library and Archives Canada used the meme in a Facebook post explaining why its employees sometimes handle rare books bare-handed.

Publications called "woman yelling at a cat" one of the best memes of 2019 and the 2010s decade, while Smudge himself topped Time magazine's 2020 list of the best popular online cats of that year.

"Woman yells at a cat" won Meme of the Year at the 12th Shorty Awards, presented to Armstrong and Smudge on May 3, 2020.

== Commentary ==
"Woman yelling at a cat" was cited as an example of the pop culture impact of The Real Housewives franchise, and of the way previously released media gain a second life on the internet.

== See also ==
- List of individual cats
- Kuleshov effect
