= Peter (Lord's cat) =

Cat at Lord's Cricket Ground in London

Peter (1950 – 5 November 1964), also known as "the Marylebone mog", was a cat who lived at Lord's Cricket Ground in London from 1952 to 1964. He is the only animal to be given an obituary in the standard cricket reference book, Wisden Cricketers' Almanack.

The obituary appeared in the 1965 edition of Wisden, under the name "CAT, PETER". It described him as "a well-known cricket-watcher" who "could often be seen prowling on the field of play"; he "loved publicity" and "frequently appeared on the television". Despite this, it seems that no photographs of him are known, although a photo of his successor, Sinbad, was snapped during a Southern Schools v The Rest match in 1963.

Peter is mentioned in the title of a 2006 anthology of Wisden obituaries, Peter, the Lord's Cat: And Other Unexpected Obituaries from Wisden.

== See also ==
- List of individual cats
