= Bobby Kertanegara =

Pet cat owned by the Djojohadikusumo family

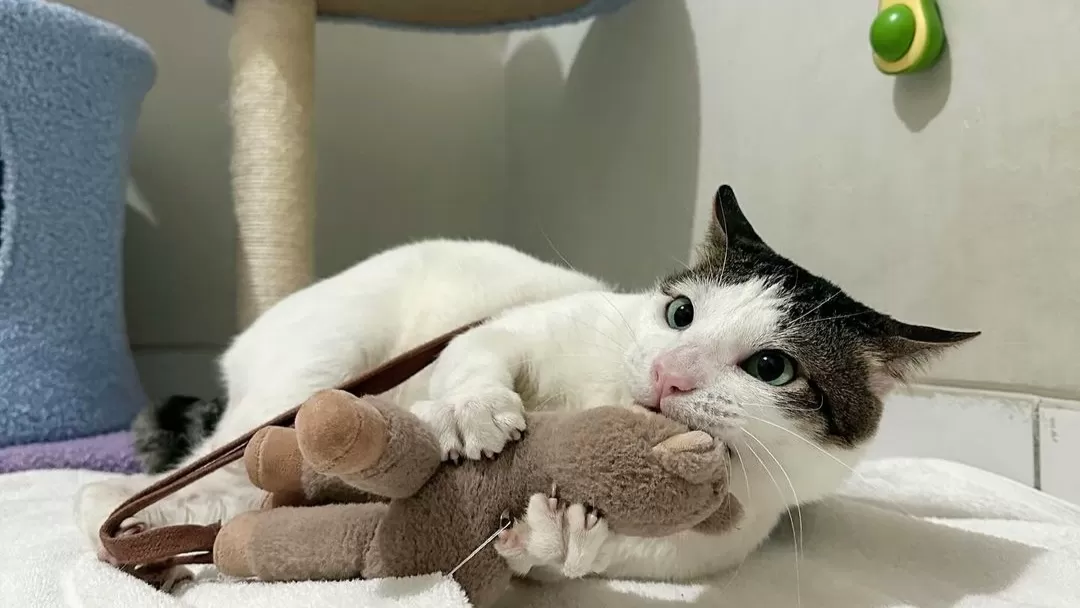
- Bobby in 2024
- Species: Cat (Felis catus)
- Breed: Shorthaired tabby
- Sex: Male
- Born: Unknown (adopted in 2017); Jakarta, Indonesia
- Occupation: Indonesian presidential pet
- Years active: 20 October 2024 – present
- Known for: Prabowo's pet cat, often featured on social media and official events
- Owner: Prabowo Subianto
- Residence: Merdeka Palace
- Named after: Jalan Kertanegara IV, Jakarta (named after Kertanegara)
- Instagram account

Bobby Kertanegara (adopted 2017) is a domestic shorthaired tabby cat, known for being the pet of Indonesian President Prabowo Subianto. After being adopted as a stray at Prabowo's residence on Jalan Kertanegara IV, Jakarta, Bobby quickly became a familiar presence during political events and social media appearances. Following Prabowo's inauguration as President on 20 October 2024, Bobby moved into the Merdeka Palace.

== Adoption ==
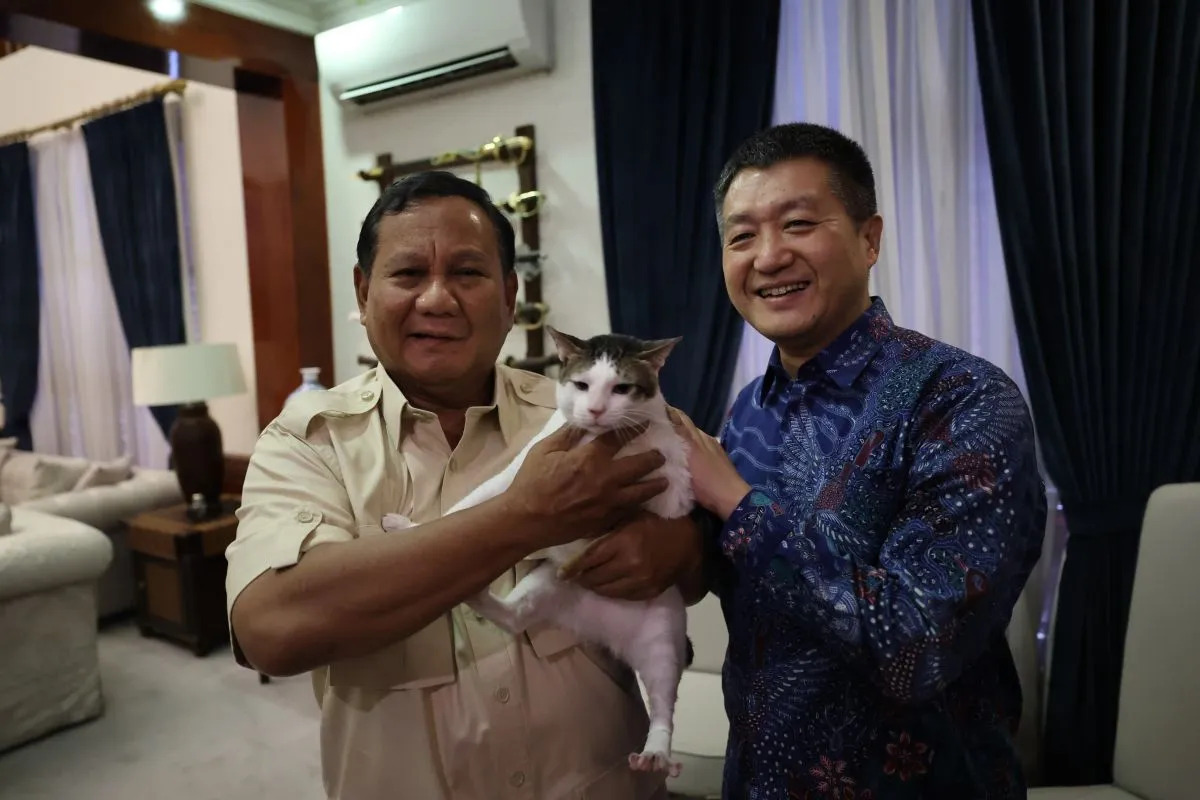
Bobby with Prabowo and the Chinese Ambassador to Indonesia, Lu Kang

Bobby was initially found as a stray around 2017 near Prabowo's residence in Jakarta. After adopting him, Prabowo named him Bobby, after Jalan Kertanegara IV. Bobby lived with Prabowo's family and was frequently seen during gatherings and meetings with political figures. Although he had been with the family since 2017, Bobby's presence became known to the public in 2018, when he appeared alongside Prabowo in various media.

During an internal meeting of the Gerindra Party at Kertanegara, Prabowo was photographed feeding Bobby, and the image quickly went viral online. Following the viral attention, a special Instagram account, initially called @bobbythek4t and later changed to @bobbykertanegara, was created to share Bobby's daily life through photos and videos. The account has gained significant popularity, amassing 1 million followers. The account, managed actively, has garnered a large following, including many of Prabowo's supporters. Followers can view a variety of Bobby's activities, such as playing, being taken for walks in a stroller, and accompanying Prabowo during notable events. One post featured Bobby supporting the Indonesian national team before a match against China. Bobby is frequently shown alongside Prabowo during meetings with guests and at public appearances.

== Presidential pet ==
After Prabowo was inaugurated as president of Indonesia in 2024, Bobby was not only at the Kertanegara house, but also often lived in the Merdeka Palace. Bobby became one of the first cats to be allowed to live in the palace environment, something that is rare in government. On several occasions, Prabowo even mentioned that Bobby should "see his room at the Palace," creating a lighthearted atmosphere in the midst of formal events. Bobby's presence at the Palace shows how important a role this pet plays in Prabowo's daily life, both as a personal soother and entertainment for guests.

In 2025, during a visit to Indonesia, Bill Gates gave Bobby a whale doll as a toy.

== Everyday life ==
One of his favorite pastimes includes being taken on walks around the house in a custom-made cat stroller bearing his name and logo. Prabowo is frequently seen playing with Bobby during breaks in his busy schedule. These interactions, often shared on social media, show Bobby accompanying Prabowo even during formal events.

== See also ==
- List of individual cats
- Prabowo Subianto
- Merdeka Palace
- Red and White Cabinet
