= Şero =

Mascot cat of Turkey's CHP Party

Şerafettin
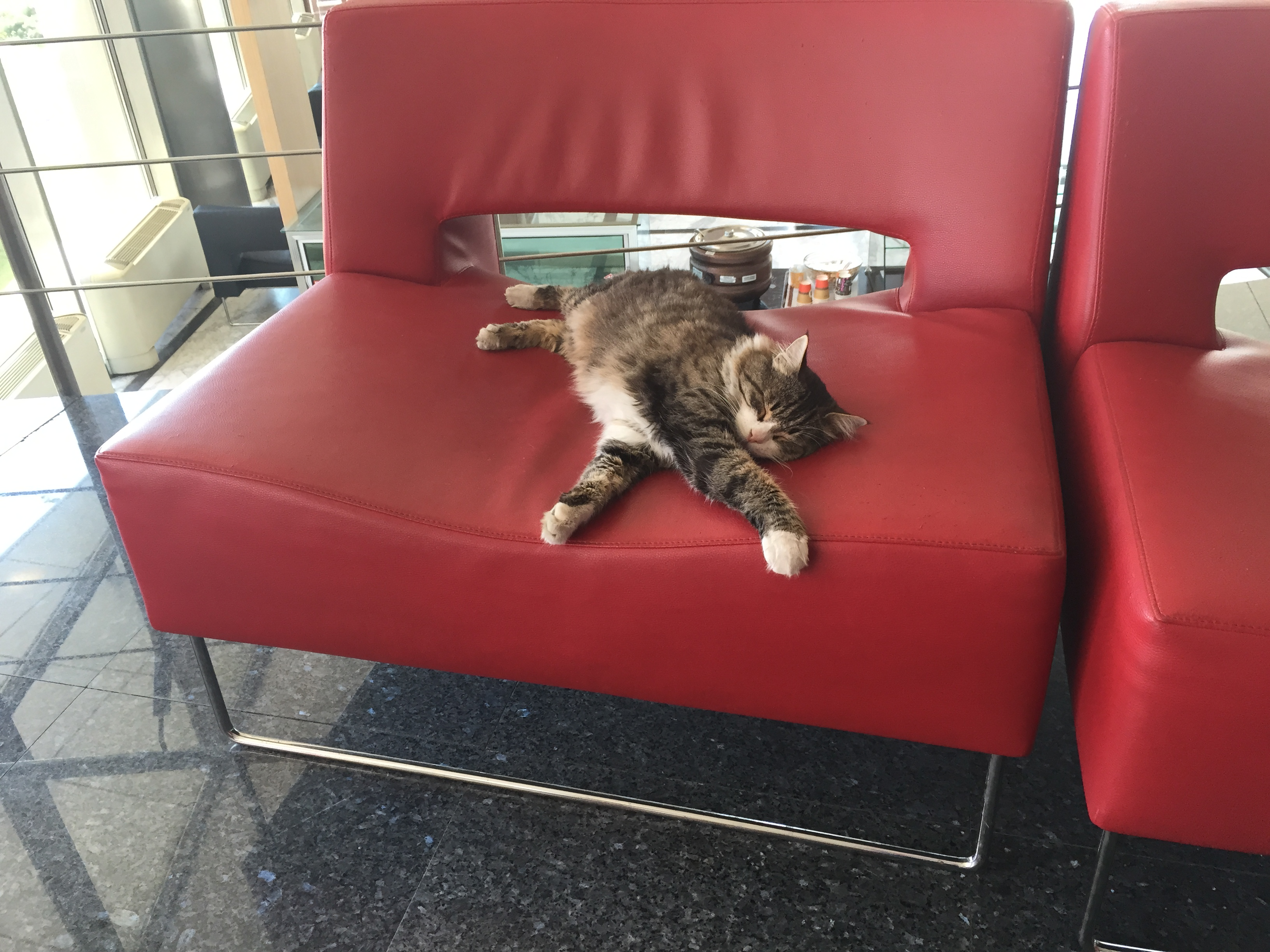
- Other name: Şero
- Species: Felis catus
- Sex: Male
- Born: 2004; Ankara, Turkey
- Died: 28 September 2024 (age 20); Ankara, Turkey
- Nationality: Turkish
- Occupation: Political mascot
- Years active: 2004-2024
- Owner: Republican People's Party (CHP)

Şerafettin (often shortened to Şero; 2005 – 28 September 2024) was a cat living in Ankara, Turkey, who resided in the headquarters of the Republican People's Party (CHP) from the building's construction in 2004 until his death in 2024. He is famous for having a Twitter account followed by more than 32,000 people, though the real operator behind the account remains unknown. Şero was the mascot of the CHP and is described as the 'standard social democratic cat'. He was a significant icon in Turkish politics, constantly appearing on the news for outlandish and humorous political comments made on his Twitter account.

Şero describes himself as the 'CHP's second-hand man', second only to former party leader Kemal Kılıçdaroğlu. His Twitter account identifies his job as 'eyeing Kılıçdaroğlu'.

== History ==
Şero had lived at the CHP headquarters since it was built, and is assumed to have been born in 2004. His name, Şerafettin, comes from the Turkish comic book character Kötü Kedi Şerafettin (Bad Cat Şerafettin), which has similarities with the comic strip character Garfield. His name was given to him by construction workers during the building's construction and is shortened to Şero. In 2012, the CHP's expenditure on cat food and cat litter in 2009 was declared illegal by the Constitutional Court of Turkey, which identified the expenditure on the cat as a misuse of party funds.

Şero has often been sighted on live television during addresses from the CHP headquarters given by party leader Deniz Baykal. More recently in 2015, Şero appeared on live television while Ahmet Hakan was interviewing party leader Kemal Kılıçdaroğlu. His appearance became popular on Twitter shortly after, prompting Hakan to address the issue of a 'cat walking around' during the interview. Şero has since become an easily identifiable mascot in Turkish politics.

In 2008, Şero was taken to a feline hospital for 14 days after suffering from depression, urethral and kidney problems.

== Elections ==
=== 2014 local and presidential elections ===
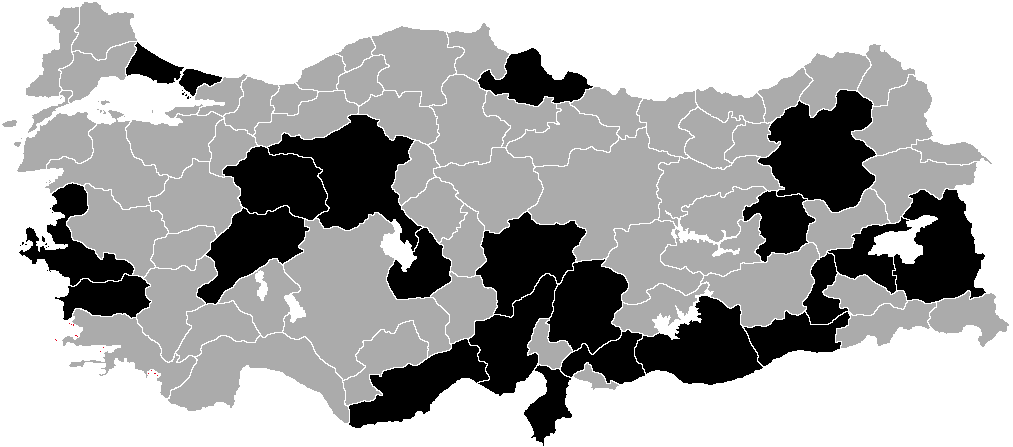
21 Provinces suffered from electricity cuts during the counting process for the local elections

On March 30, 2014, local elections were held throughout Turkey to elect municipal councillors, mayors and neighbourhood presidents. Large-scale electricity cuts and electoral fraud dominated the counting process. Energy minister Taner Yıldız later attributed the nationwide power-cuts to cats entering transformers, a statement which was initially assumed to be an April Fool's joke. The statement caused uproar amongst the opposition, with the CHP deputy leader Gürsel Tekin calling on Şero to 'assemble the CHP's cat wing' to guard the transformers during the August 2014 presidential election that followed shortly after. Tekin's response to Yıldız was seen as an indication that the CHP did not take the minister's excuses for the power-cuts seriously and attributed them to aiding the government's vote-rigging efforts instead. Following Yıldız's remarks, Şero obtained the new nickname, 'the cat that didn't go into a transformer' (trafoya girmeyen kedi).

On Twitter, Şero promised his first 2,000 followers CHP candidacies for municipal councillor positions for the 2014 local elections.

=== June 2015 general election ===
In response to the Supreme Electoral Council President Sadi Güven saying that they had 'rounded up all the cats' in preparation for the June 2015 general election, Şero tweeted 'I'm still here, come and round me up' in response. The tweet went viral shortly after and was reported by several media outlets.

On 6 April 2015, a day before the CHP party candidates were announced, the candidates chosen by Kılıçdaroğlu were leaked on Şero's Twitter account. On 18 April, Şero predicted that the outcome of the election would be a hung parliament and would result in a CHP coalition with the Peoples' Democratic Party (HDP).

== Animal rights ==
In October 2014, on World Animal Day, the CHP released a decree co-signed by Veli Ağbaba, Gürsel Tekin and Şero (who had a paw-print) that urged municipalities to spend more of their budgets on the rehoming and rehabilitation stray animals. The decree urged municipalities to employ veterinarians, provide an ambulance service for animals injured in car accidents, bury dead animals and supply food and water in city corners for dehydrated animals during the summer.

== Death ==
Şero was announced dead on September 28, 2024 following illnesses caused by his old age. He was buried in the garden of the CHP headquarters on the same day with a small funeral attended by Özgür Özel.

== See also ==
- List of individual cats
