= Cheeto (cat) =

Tabby cat living at UC Davis

- Cheeto in 2026
- Species: Cat
- Breed: Orange tabby
- Sex: Male
- Born: c. 2011 (age 14–15)
- Known for: Residence at the UC Davis Physics Building; unofficial campus mascot and emotional comfort figure

Cheeto is an orange tabby cat associated with the Physics Building at the University of California, Davis. He has lived on the Davis campus since at least the early 2010s and is widely recognized by students and staff as a beloved campus animal. Cheeto’s popularity has been noted by UC Davis publications and local media. In 2019, he gained national attention for postings concerning his weight gain and overfeeding by the public.

== Popularity and recognition ==
Cheeto is frequently referenced in UC Davis communications and student media. The UC Davis Admissions blog identifies him as a campus “fixture” and notes that he began appearing around 2011. Student newspaper The California Aggie has repeatedly recognized Cheeto in its “Best of Davis/Best Campus Animal” lists, including in 2022, 2023, and 2025.

UC Davis Magazine reported on “Animals on Campus” in 2019, highlighting Cheeto’s role as a campus fixture outside the Physics Building. The article described efforts by community caretakers and department staff to manage his health and explained that signs were posted asking people not to feed him due to weight concerns. Similar notices drew broader attention in local media. In 2019, The Sacramento Bee covered the physics department’s “Please don’t feed” sign regarding Cheeto’s weight.

In 2023, after Cheeto and his weight had again gone viral on the social media platform TikTok, Newsweek reported that Cheeto’s weight issues had improved since the university posted the signs in 2019. A UC Davis spokesperson described Cheeto as “a particular favorite with students.”

Cheeto also appeared on the 2022 Thank Goodness For Staff logo produced by UC Davis Staff Assembly.

Cheeto is currently listed as a faculty member on the UC Davis Physics building directory located in the lobby. He has a satirical "rate my professor" page with a perfect rating.

== See also ==
- List of individual cats
