= Mittens (cat) =

Cat and local celebrity

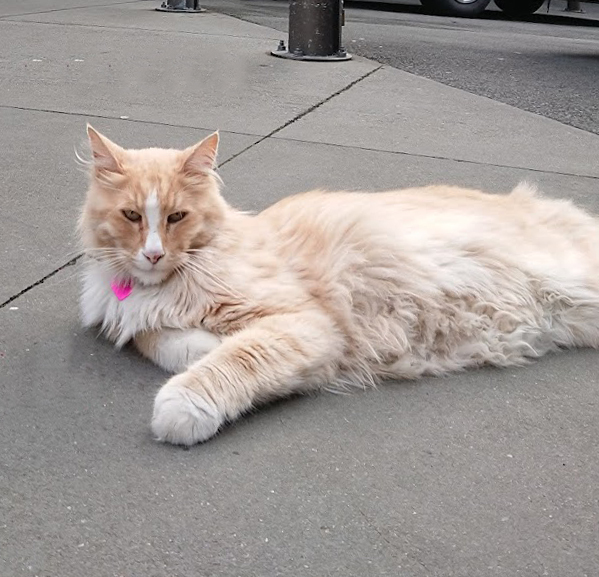
- Mittens visiting Victoria University of Wellington in November 2018
- Other names: Mittens the Cat of Wellington; His Royal Floofiness
- Species: Felis catus
- Breed: Turkish Angora
- Sex: Male
- Born: 2009 (age 16–17)
- Occupation: Pet; Local celebrity; Media personality

Mittens is a domestic cat, formerly of Wellington, New Zealand, who wandered in Te Aro and the city's central business district. A feline flâneur, he roams up to 2 kilometres (1.2 mi) from his home. Selfie pictures with the cat have become a desired item for locals. Mittens is occasionally taken to the SPCA or the police.

Originally from the suburbs of Auckland, he has become a social media celebrity since he, his late brother Latte, and their owner Silvio Bruinsma moved to the capital city in 2017. He featured on the 2018 edition of the Wellington Advent Calendar, an online calendar counting down the days before Christmas. Sam Thacker, an SPCA staff member, posted a polite direction about how to treat Mittens if anyone comes across him; asking members of the public not to report or take him in as they are familiar with his behaviour.

On 22 May 2020, Mittens was given the Key to the City of Wellington. Previous recipients include Sir Peter Jackson and Sir Richard Taylor. Later in 2020, he was the subject of an exhibition at the Wellington Museum and a candidate for New Zealander of the Year in August.

On 5 February 2021, Mittens was seen being taken in to a car, presumably, to be taken to the abductor's home, for pictures. Mittens' owner described the abductor's actions as a "massive error in judgement". With the help of the social media community, Mittens was quickly located and returned home.

On 10 November 2021, It was reported that Mittens was looking to relocate to his home city of Auckland. Andy Foster the mayor of Wellington was quoted saying "He does have the Key to the City so he's welcome back at any time."

A children's song, "Mittens" by Chris Sanders and Natalie Conaty, was released in December 2020 and peaked at number one on the New Zealand iTunes Charts list of top songs. A book titled The Adventure of Mittens, written by Bruinsma and illustrated by Phoebe Morris, was released by Penguin Books in August 2021.

== See also ==
- List of individual cats
