= Micka (cat) =

Cat owned by Petr Pavel

Micka (2012 – 16 April 2024) was a female domestic cat belonging to the President of the Czech Republic Petr Pavel. The cat frequently appeared in Pavel's media campaign during the 2023 Czech presidential election. Micka likely resided at Prague Castle.

The Czech public reacted very positively to Micka's inclusion in the campaign. Pavel stated that Micka, together with the flannel shirt, became one of his icons. Pavel classifies these elements as humorous but still worthy of representing his presidency.

According to the head of Petr Pavel's election campaign Pavla Nýdrlová, his team will strive to relocate the cat to Prague Castle. In that case, it would be the first pet to be officially housed at Prague Castle for a long time.

== Life ==
According to Eva Pavlová, Micka was found with the assistance of the family's dog Bob during a snowdrift in December 2012. A long stay to adverse cold conditions caused Micka to lose a piece of her tail. She traveled regularly to Brussels with Petr Pavel and Eva Pavlová although she doesn't like traveling too much. On 16 April 2024, she died.

== See also ==
- List of individual cats
