= Venus (cat) =

American tortoiseshell cat (2009–2026)

- Species: Felis catus
- Breed: Domestic short hair
- Sex: Female
- Born: July 6, 2009
- Died: August 16, 2026 (aged 17)
- Known for: Unusual coloring
- Residence: North Carolina
- Appearance: Tortoiseshell cat, black right half of face with green eye, red tabby left half of face with blue eye, black and orange mixed on the body

Venus (July 6, 2009 – August 16, 2026), also known as Venus the Two-Faced Cat, was an American tortoiseshell cat famous for having a half black and half red tabby face. In addition, her eyes were heterochromic, her right eye being green, her left blue. Her social media accounts use the tagline "0% photoshopped, 100% born this way!"

Venus was adopted as a stray in September 2009 by a couple in North Carolina who have four other pets, cats Tater Tot, Roo and Ginger, and dog Halo. She became famous after a Reddit post in August 2012. As of September 2012 she had more than a million views on YouTube; as of December 2015 she had 673,000 Instagram followers and almost a million "likes" on Facebook. She appeared on The Today Show in August 2012 and on Fox & Friends in July 2014.

She has been described by veterinarians as a chimera, but her markings may alternatively be a matter of luck, an unusual expression of mosaicism. She also had different-colored eyes: the blue eye on the ginger side of her face suggests the latter, since it is presumably caused by the piebald gene that also produced her white paws and white spots on her chest.

Venus died from kidney disease on August 16, 2026, at the age of 17 along with her companion, Roo.

== See also ==
- List of individual cats
