= Tsim Tung Brother Cream =

British Shorthair cat (2005–2020)

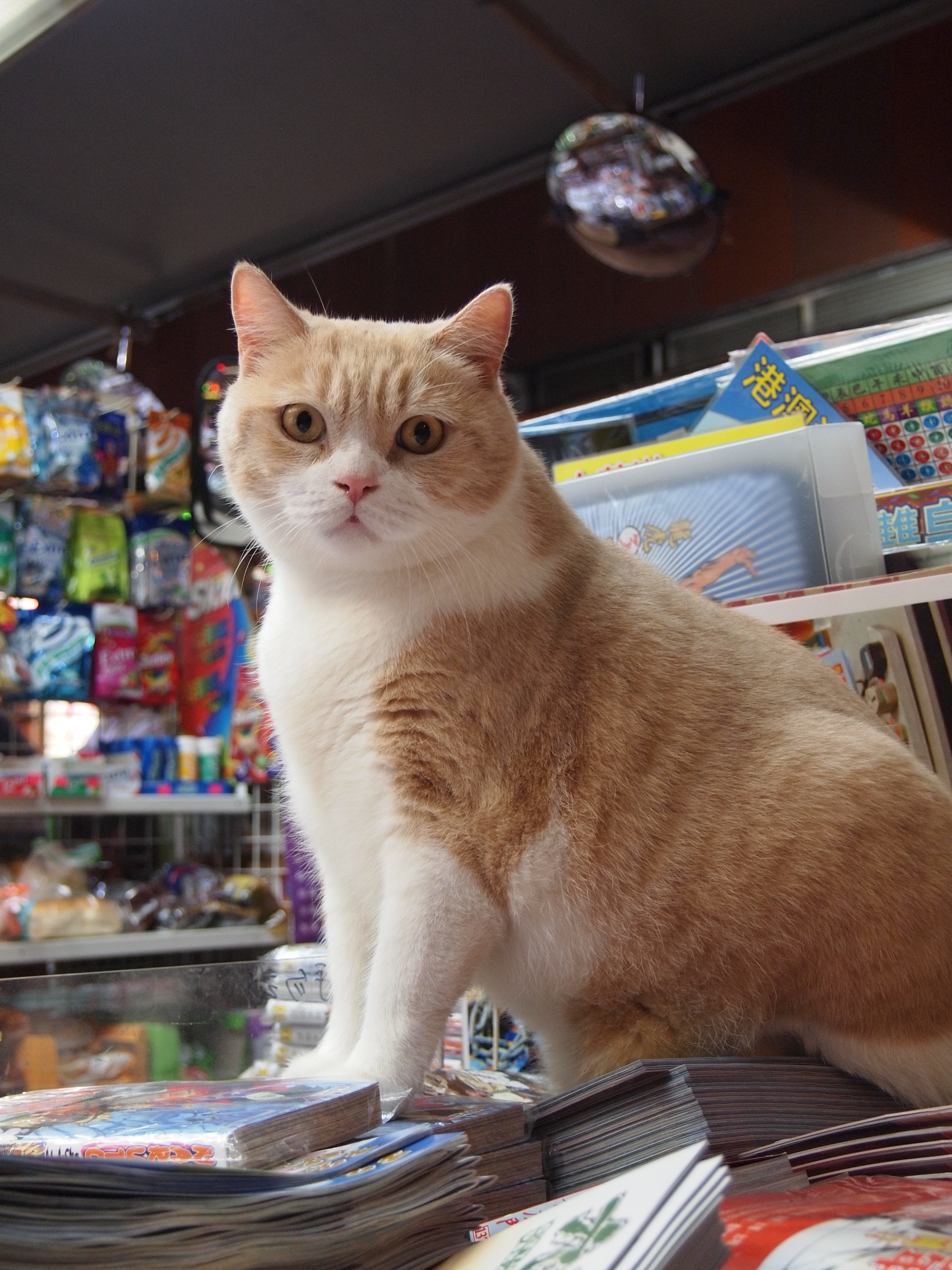
- Brother Cream in 2012
- Chinese: 尖東忌廉哥
- Literal meaning: Tsim Sha Tsui East Brother Cream
Transcriptions
Standard Mandarin
- Hanyu Pinyin: Jiāndōng Jìlián Gē
Yue: Cantonese
- Jyutping: zim1 dung1 gei6 lim4 go1

Tsim Tung Brother Cream (also known as "Cream Aberdeen" or Brother Cream for short; 2005–2020) was a male British Shorthair cat who lived at a convenience store in Tsim Sha Tsui East, Kowloon, Hong Kong. After disappearing in 2012, he became one of the most famous cats in Hong Kong. He died of stomach cancer on 24 May 2020.

== Career ==
Tsim Tung Brother Cream was born in 2005 and lived at a convenience store in Tsim Sha Tsui East, Kowloon, Hong Kong, owned by Ko Chee-shing, his owner.

On 10 July 2012, Brother Cream disappeared, allegedly stolen. Fans of the feline helped to post notices alerting area people about the lost cat. He was allegedly released 20 days later. He was found 26 days later in an alleyway and was returned to his owner. The cat had lost 1.4 kg (3.1 lb) while he was away. The incident was published on the front page of local Hong Kong newspapers, and Brother Cream became one of the most famous cats in Hong Kong. A little over two months after the incident, the cat's Facebook page had over 26,000 "likes". On 31 March 2013, the South China Morning Post reported that Brother Cream had over 108,000 followers on Facebook. As of May 2014, Brother Cream had over 160,000 likes on Facebook. As of January 2015 he had more than 170,000 Facebook "likes".

Brother Cream had a partner named Sister Cream, a female, Scottish Fold cat with black and white colouring.

In May 2016 Brother Cream retired as "manager" of the store when it closed. Living at home with Ko, he lost some weight; he appeared at a book fair in July 2016 to promote his biography.

Brother Cream died of stomach cancer at his home on 24 May 2020.

== Books ==
In 2012 Ichiban Publishing published Brother Cream in East TST about Brother Cream. On 30 March 2013, Brother Cream was present at a book-signing event for the book at Mikiki mall in San Po Kong, in which hundreds of people showed up to see the cat; the cat's paws were scanned and stamps were created to act as a signature from the cat. As of July 2013 the book had sold more than 20,000 copies. His second book, Cream Chicken Soup, was published in 2013.

== Advertising, television and merchandise ==
Brother Cream has received coverage on television shows. Due to his popularity, Brother Cream appeared in two television advertisement contracts in 2013, for Nikon and Wing On Travel. Brother Cream was also involved in the filming of a television series to be aired on Citybus, one of the major bus operators in Hong Kong. He (and his owner) were interviewed on CNN News in 2015.

Postcards were created that feature Brother Cream.

== Filmography ==
=== Television ===
- Big Boys Club (TVB) (interview)

== See also ==
- Bodega cat
- List of individual cats
