= Pot Roast (cat) =

Viral TikTok cat (2014–2022)

- Born: August 8, 2014
- Died: February 16, 2022 (aged 7)

TikTok information
- Page: Pot Roast's mom
- Followers: 1.2M
- Last updated: September 15, 2023

Pot Roast (August 8, 2014 – February 16, 2022) was an American cat from Kansas City who went viral on TikTok for her bedraggled appearance. She was owned by an anonymous woman who goes by "Pot Roast's Mom" online due to privacy concerns.

== Life ==
Pot Roast was adopted as a kitten in 2014, when her owner met her at an event hosted by the Missouri University of Science and Technology. She was originally going to be named Concrete; however, "Pot Roast’s Mom" could not correctly spell Concrete consistently. The name Pot Roast was inspired by the "Caucasian middle class dish" of the same name. Her owner, a student at the time, hid the kitten in her bedroom closet at her sorority house for a week, but due to the house's no-pet rule, the kitten took up residence in the neighboring fraternity house. The shelter was not forthcoming about all of the cat's health problems, including feline herpes and stomatitis (which resulted in all of her teeth eventually being extracted). "Pot Roast’s Mom" kept her teeth and pasted them on a canvas.

After first posting on TikTok in late 2020, Pot Roast and her owner quickly gained traction, in part due to the cat's "listless" and "stiff-limbed" appearance, which resulted in an ongoing joke that Pot Roast was taxidermied. Videos included her owner monologuing or answers to comments, all while holding Pot Roast for comedic effect, who sometimes wore hats.

At the time of Pot Roast's death, "Pot Roast's Mom" had 930,000 followers.

== Death and legacy ==
In early February 2022 Pot Roast was diagnosed with FIV, and her quality of life declined in the following weeks. She died on February 16. Her owner continued to post on TikTok, updating followers on her grieving process. Some viewers harassed her owner and criticized her for jokes she made about her grieving process or her decision to keep and articulate Pot Roast's bones.

"Pot Roast’s Mom" is currently living with her three cats, Coupon, Seance and Shriek as well as various foster kittens. Her other male cat, Rocko, died on February 22, 2024, and her female cat, Faucet, died on the 5th August 2024 from complications of routine flea treatment One of her followers also sent her a FurReal Friends cat customized to look like Pot Roast. The robotic toy, which has since made appearances in TikTok videos, was deemed Bot Roast. Initially, "Pot Roast's Mom" introduced the toy to her followers by declaring that it was "Pot Roast's taxidermy".

As of April 2023, "Pot Roast's Mom" is writing a book about pet grief.
