= Tiddles =

Cat at Paddington Station, London

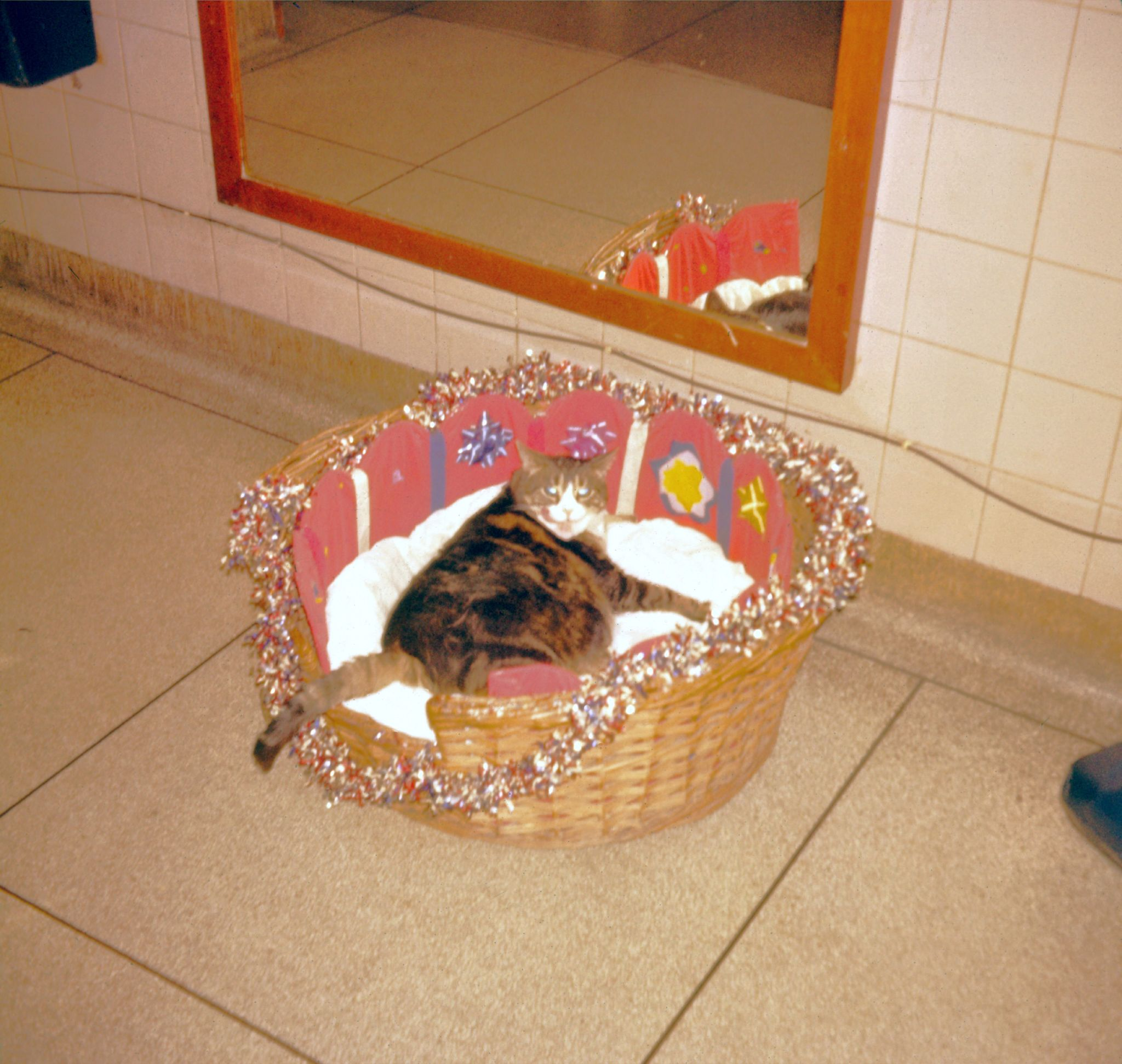
- Tiddles in 1978
- Species: Felis catus
- Sex: Male
- Born: 1970
- Died: 1983
- Occupation: Station master
- Residence: Ladies toilet at Paddington station
- Appearance: Orange and white fur

Tiddles (1970–1983), also known as the Paddington station cat, was a beloved cat who lived in the ladies' toilet of Paddington station in London from 1970 to 1983. Due to the cat's international fame, the ladies' room at the station turned into a tourist destination. Visitors offered the cat near-constant gifts of high quality meats, leading Tiddles to fatten into his famously large physique. Tiddles was recognised with a first place finish in the 1982 London Fat Cat Championship, and reached a weight of 32 pounds (15 kg).

An American reporter for the La Crosse Tribune described the cat as being "as much of an attraction as the British Museum and the Tower of London" and a British Rail representative called the cat "an institution" upon his death. Tiddles has been compared to the fictional Paddington Bear character and was described as being "nearly as famous".

== Discovery ==
Initially a stray kitten, Tiddles moved into the ladies room of Paddington station in September 1970 when he was about six weeks old. Paddington station's longtime ladies' room attendant, June Watson, felt the kitten brush against her leg on a cold morning. When she realized he was not a rat, Watson took an interest in the kitten and did not object when the kitten followed her downstairs to the toilets, where he proceeded to move in. She named him Tiddles.

Word of "Paddington Cat" spread among London women and then an international audience. Observers drew parallels with the fictional Paddington Bear from the 1958 children's book A Bear Called Paddington, who arrives at Paddington station with a note pinned to his coat saying "Please look after me".

=== Lifestyle ===
Tiddles rarely moved, and he spent most of his time in a large, pillow-filled wicker basket, which he was given after he outgrew his previous two beds. The tile walls next to the cat were covered with colorful fan mail from hundreds of distant locations, and a sign for tourists displayed the following message:

I’m a boy. My name is Tiddles.

I was 10 years old in October, 1980
I live down here in the ladies’ loo. My weight is 28 lbs.
I can walk, run, and jump when I feel like it
I eat rabbit, kidney, cod, steak, and chicken.

I go upstairs early in the morning for a walk on the platform.

Tiddles sometimes strolled through the stalls or took nibbles of his cat grass. He was known to resist touch from visitors until they presented him choice cuts of meat, at which point he happily sprawled out on his back. Watson reported that Tiddles preferred to stay at Paddington station overnight rather than go home with her, and that he sometimes strolled the platform before crowds arrived. Watson said, "He doesn’t leave the station. He doesn’t like the traffic."

== Obesity ==
Visitors offered gifts of food for Tiddles and the obese cat was far from "tiddly", making his name ironic. As Tiddles adjusted to near-constant meat offerings from fans, his taste preferences evolved toward a diet of delicacies that were always in fresh and high-quality cuts, and included chicken liver, kidneys, rabbit, and steak. Watson said, "He won’t even smell canned cat foods, dry mixes or even expensive canned salmon". The station kept a personal refrigerator for cat's meats and milk.

Tiddles' obesity and health conditions worsened, and weight loss attempts repeatedly failed. Due to blood pressure concerns, a veterinarian eventually prohibited Tiddles from eating his favorite food of raw liver. In 1982, Tiddles won the title of London Fat Cat Champion, weighing in at 30 pounds (14 kg). High-calorie gourmet handouts had "blown Tiddles from being a waif kitten into a mighty moggy", reported the Sydney Morning Herald. Due to his shocking size, Tiddles was featured in foreign magazines and art, including a 1993 painting by Frances Broomfield, and a project by a Canadian camera crew.

Tiddles was likely the most famous fat cat in Britain at the time, but he was not the most fat: a cat in Newport, Wales named Poppa the 1984 Guinness World Record for fattest cat.

== Fans and festivities ==
A La Crosse Tribune reporter who traveled to London said he was "as much of an attraction as the British Museum and the Tower of London". He was "a London tourist attraction in his own right," per Londonist. A writer for The Age in Melbourne called Paddington Station's ladies room the "loo of all loos".

The cat was flooded with festive offerings, including his own Christmas tree. His corner of the ladies' room was decorated for events including the Silver Jubilee of Elizabeth II in 1977 and the wedding of Prince Charles and Lady Diana Spencer in 1981. A tabloid joked that Tiddles' interest in the royals may be because the cat, who was surrounded by adoring women and gourmet food, was "something of an aristocrat himself."

To celebrate the anniversary of the cat's adoption into Paddington Station, parties with wine were held at the ladies' loo.

== Death ==
By the end of his life, Tiddles weighed 32 pounds (15 kg) and resembled "a beach ball with fur". He was euthanised in 1983, aged 13, after veterinarians found fluid around his lungs. British Rail said it was saddened by the loss, with a representative calling Tiddles "an institution" and "part of the station history".

The practice of British Rail stations keeping cats as permanent vermin patrol dates back to the 1840s, when feline patrollers prevented rats from chewing through cables; cat patrollers were "paid" by the British Rail in food, board and medical treatment. Before being phased out entirely, the number of cats on staff across all stations declined from approximately 2000 in the 1930s to just 200 in 1993.

== See also ==
- List of individual cats
