= Fred the Undercover Kitty =

Domestic shorthaired cat

- Born: May 2005; Brooklyn, New York
- Died: August 9, 2006 (aged 1); Queens, New York
- Cause of death: Struck and killed by an automobile

Fred the Undercover Kitty (May 2005 – August 9, 2006) was a domestic shorthaired cat who gained attention for his undercover work with the New York Police Department and the Brooklyn District Attorney's Office in the arrest of a suspect posing as a veterinary care provider.

== Early life and adoption ==
Fred was born in the spring of 2005 in Brooklyn, New York. In September 2005, he was rescued by Animal Care & Control of New York City, suffering from severe pneumonia and a collapsed lung. Fred was adopted by assistant district attorney Carol Moran, as part of a foster care program run by Animal Care & Control of New York City, and was nursed back to health.

Fred and his brother George were named after Fred and George Weasley, the prankster brothers in the Harry Potter series of novels created by J.K. Rowling.

== Law enforcement career and honors ==
In February 2006, Fred was enlisted by the Brooklyn District Attorney’s office as an undercover agent, posing as a would-be patient to help the NYPD apprehend Steven Vassall, a Brooklyn man suspected of acting as a veterinarian without proper license or training. Working with human undercover detective Stephanie Green-Jones, Fred was bait in a February 3, 2006, sting operation to apprehend Steven Vassall, who was charged with unauthorized veterinary practice, criminal mischief, injuring animals and petty larceny. In May 2007, Vassall pleaded guilty to the charges of fraud and practicing veterinary medicine without a licence. As a result of his plea he was sentenced to probation and mandatory psychiatric treatment.

On May 18, 2006, Fred was presented with a Law Enforcement Appreciation Award by Brooklyn district attorney Charles J. Hynes. Fred was later honored on July 8, 2006, at "Broadway Barks 8!", the New York City Theater District’s dog and cat adopt-a-thon benefit hosted by Mary Tyler Moore and Bernadette Peters. He was presented with the Mayor’s Alliance Award, which is given to remarkable animals.

== Later life ==
Following the sting operation, Fred began to receive training as a therapy animal, with the purpose of becoming a teaching-animal in the district attorneys office's "Legal Lives" program. Here, he would be taken into classrooms to help teach children how to treat and care for animals. The owner also received offers from animal talent agencies for him to have spots in television commercials.

== Death ==
Fred died on August 9, 2006, when he escaped from his home in Queens, New York, and was struck and killed by a car. Fred was 15 months old.

== See also ==
- List of individual cats
