= Michi (cat) =

Julian Assange's cat

- Other name: Embassy Cat
- Species: Felis catus
- Years active: 2016–2018
- Owner: Julian Assange
- Residence: Embassy of Ecuador, London

Michi, also known as Embassy Cat, was the pet cat of Julian Assange from May 2016 until November 2018, when he reportedly gave away the cat, or April 2019, when he was evicted from the Ecuadorian embassy. In November 2018 the Ecuadorian embassy set a series of house rules in place for Assange, including that he was responsible for the cat's "well-being, food, and hygiene"; his lawyer called this requirement to care for his cat "denigrating", and according to NPR his failure to do so arguably played "a small role" in him being evicted from the embassy.

== Origin ==
Assange obtained the cat in 2016, saying it was a gift from his children. This has been disputed, with The New Yorker quoting a friend of Assange who said "Julian stared at the cat for about half an hour, trying to figure out how it could be useful, and then came up with this: Yeah, let's say it's from my children. For a time, he said it didn't have a name because there was a competition in Ecuador, with schoolchildren, on what to name him. Everything is P.R.—everything."

The cat's name, "Michi", is Kichwa for "cat", but it was more commonly known after its Twitter handle "Embassy Cat", as well as being occasionally called "James" or "Cat-stro", the latter after former Cuban leader Fidel Castro.

== Social media ==
Under the moniker "Embassy Cat" Michi had accounts on Twitter and Instagram with more than 30,000 followers on the former, having gained more than 3,000 in the first day, and 6,000 on the latter; according to Vox, Assange desired the cat to be a social media celebrity, while according to The New Yorker it was less a pet and more a branding exercise. In May 2016 "Embassy Cat" was tweeting regularly, but this had declined by the end of the year and in 2017 it tweeted only three times, and in 2018 just twice.

The posts were typically cute pictures, with a "bit of political grandstanding thrown in", as well as constant puns. The topics included Hillary Clinton, Brexit, and human rights. According to The New York Times, it was an extension of Assange's politics, used to "promote his causes" as well as sell t-shirts, and that if the purpose had been "to put a cute face on the thorny politics of an international fugitive", it had been effective.

== Embassy rules ==
In 2018, the embassy set a series of house rules in place for Assange's residence there. These included that he must be responsible for the "well-being, food, and hygiene" of his pet, and that if he failed to do so the cat may be confiscated.

Assange took the Ecuadorian government to court over these rules, arguing that they violated his right to asylum; according to his attorney, Baltasar Garzón, the obligations related to his cat were "denigrating". Judge Karina Martinez ruled against him, saying that the "authorities have the right to decide what is and is not allowed inside the building". According to NPR, his failure to care for Michi arguably played "a small role" in Assange being evicted from the Embassy.

== Post-embassy life ==
Journalist James Ball said that he offered to adopt the cat, but said that it was "reportedly given to a shelter by the Ecuadorian embassy ages ago". Hanna Jonasson, a member of Assange's legal team, disputes this, saying that the cat is with Assange's family and "they will be reunited in freedom", while the embassy said "it was taken by Mr. Assange's associates", adding "we are not a pet store, we do not keep pets here."

Assange reportedly gave away the cat in November 2018, just after he lost his court case against the rules requiring to care for it, as its "isolation became unbearable" and to "allow it a healthier life."

== See also ==
- List of individual cats
