= State visit by Barack Obama to the United Kingdom =

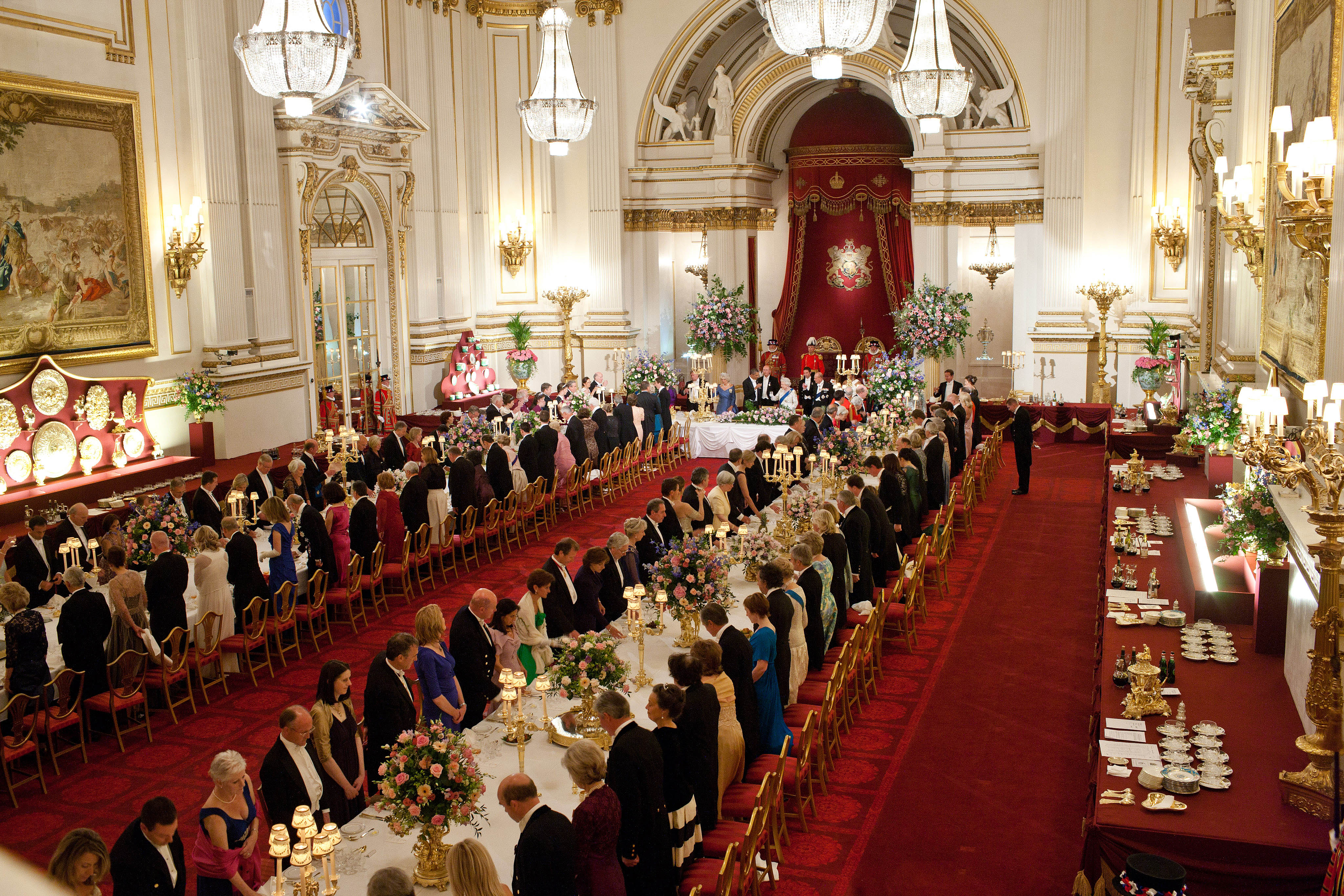
- Date: 24 to 26 May 2011
- Location: London Oxford
- Type: State visit
- Participants: President Barack Obama; First Lady Michelle Obama

From 24 to 26 May 2011, President Barack Obama of the United States made a state visit to the United Kingdom with his wife, Michelle Obama. He was received by Queen Elizabeth II and stayed at Buckingham Palace. The visit marked the second time a U.S. president had been invited for a state visit to the United Kingdom. The Obamas had previously met Queen Elizabeth and her husband, Prince Philip, at Buckingham Palace during the G20 summit in London in April 2009.

== Schedule ==
=== 24 May ===
President Barack Obama and First Lady Michelle Obama arrived in London in the morning of 24 May 2011 and met Charles, Prince of Wales and Camilla, Duchess of Cornwall at Winfield House before being taken to Buckingham Palace where they were greeted by Queen Elizabeth II and Prince Philip, Duke of Edinburgh. The presidential couple then met with the Duke and Duchess of Cambridge inside the palace before joining the Queen, the Duke of Edinburgh, the Prince of Wales and the Duchess of Cornwall at the West Terrace. The President then received a royal salute and inspected the Guard of Honour formed by 1st Battalion Scots Guards. Gun salutes were fired in the Green Park and at the Tower of London to mark the occasion. After a private luncheon the presidential couple joined the Queen to view items from the Royal Collection. This was followed by an exchange of gifts between the presidential couple and Queen Elizabeth II and Prince Philip, Duke of Edinburgh in the afternoon, with the Queen and the Duke of Edinburgh presenting the President with copies of letters in the royal archives from U.S. presidents to members of the British royal family and gifting the First Lady with an antique brooch in the form of a rose made of gold and red coral. The Queen in return received an album documenting her parents King George VI and Queen Elizabeth's visit to the U.S. in 1939 while the Duke was presented with a custom-made set of Fell Pony bits and shanks and original horseshoes worn by recently retired champion carriage horse Jamaica. The Obamas also gifted the Prince of Wales a special selection of plants, seedlings and seeds from the gardens of Mount Vernon, Monticello, and the South Lawn of the White House, as well as jars of honey from the White House beehive.

The Obamas then visited Westminster Abbey to lay a wreath on the grave of the Unknown Warrior and the President notably dated his signature in the guest book "24 May 2008". They were then taken to 10 Downing Street where they met Prime Minister David Cameron and his wife Samantha Cameron. The president and the prime minister also visited the Globe Academy where they played table tennis with students. Barack Obama then met with Leader of the Opposition Ed Miliband at Buckingham Palace. In the evening, the Obamas joined the Queen and members of the royal family for the state banquet at the palace. Members of the royal family present at the state banquet included the Duke of Edinburgh, the Prince of Wales, the Duchess of Cornwall, the Duke of York, the Earl and Countess of Wessex, the Princess Royal, the Duke and Duchess of Gloucester, the Duke of Kent, Prince and Princess Michael of Kent, and Princess Alexandra, The Hon. Lady Ogilvy. Also in attendance were Secretary of State Hillary Clinton, Prime Minister David Cameron, Deputy Prime Minister Nick Clegg, former Prime Ministers Sir John Major, Tony Blair and Gordon Brown and their wives, Labour Party leader Ed Miliband, and Mayor of London Boris Johnson. In her speech the Queen mentioned that the "exchange of people and projects has enlarged and invigorated our common language – although I think you will agree we do not always use it in quite the same way!". The president stated: "We can have confidence in the partnership that our two countries share, based on the rock-solid foundation built during Queen Elizabeth's lifetime of extraordinary service to the nation and to the world."

=== 25 May ===
In the morning, President Obama visited 10 Downing Street, where he and Michelle Obama later joined David and Samantha Cameron in serving food to members of the U.S. and UK military. The president also held a joint press conference with the prime minister at Lancaster House. He addressed the UK Parliament at the Palace of Westminster, which marked the first time that a U.S. president had addressed both houses of Parliament in the United Kingdom. Michelle Obama met with students from Elizabeth Garrett Anderson School at Christ Church, Oxford. In the evening, the Obamas hosted the Queen and the Duke of Edinburgh for a dinner at Winfield House after which the couples bid each other farewell.

=== 26 May ===
The President and the First Lady left Buckingham Palace and departed for the U.S. at Stansted Airport, marking the end of the state visit.

== Gallery ==
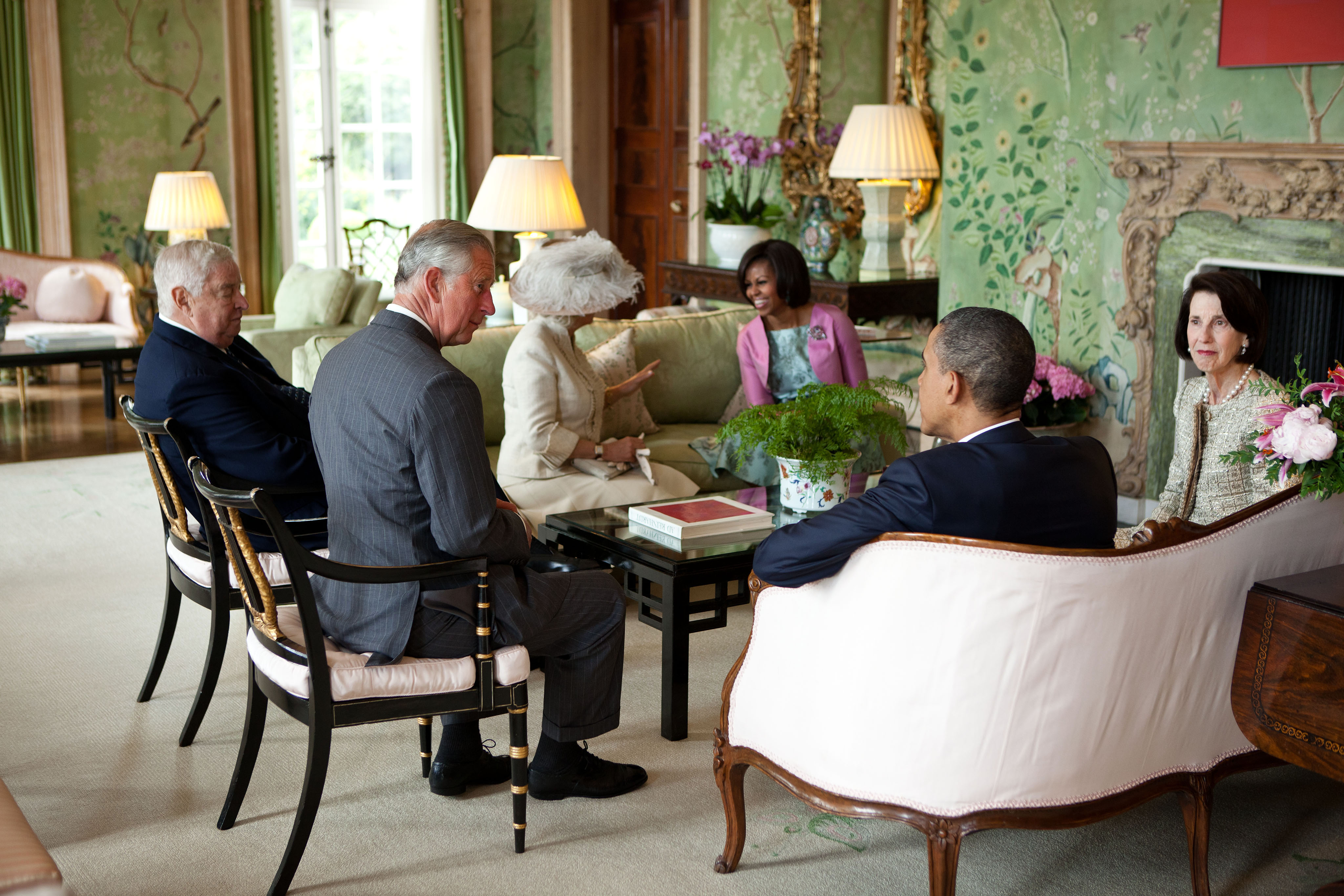
President Obama and First Lady Michelle Obama with the Prince of Wales and the Duchess of Cornwall at Winfield House

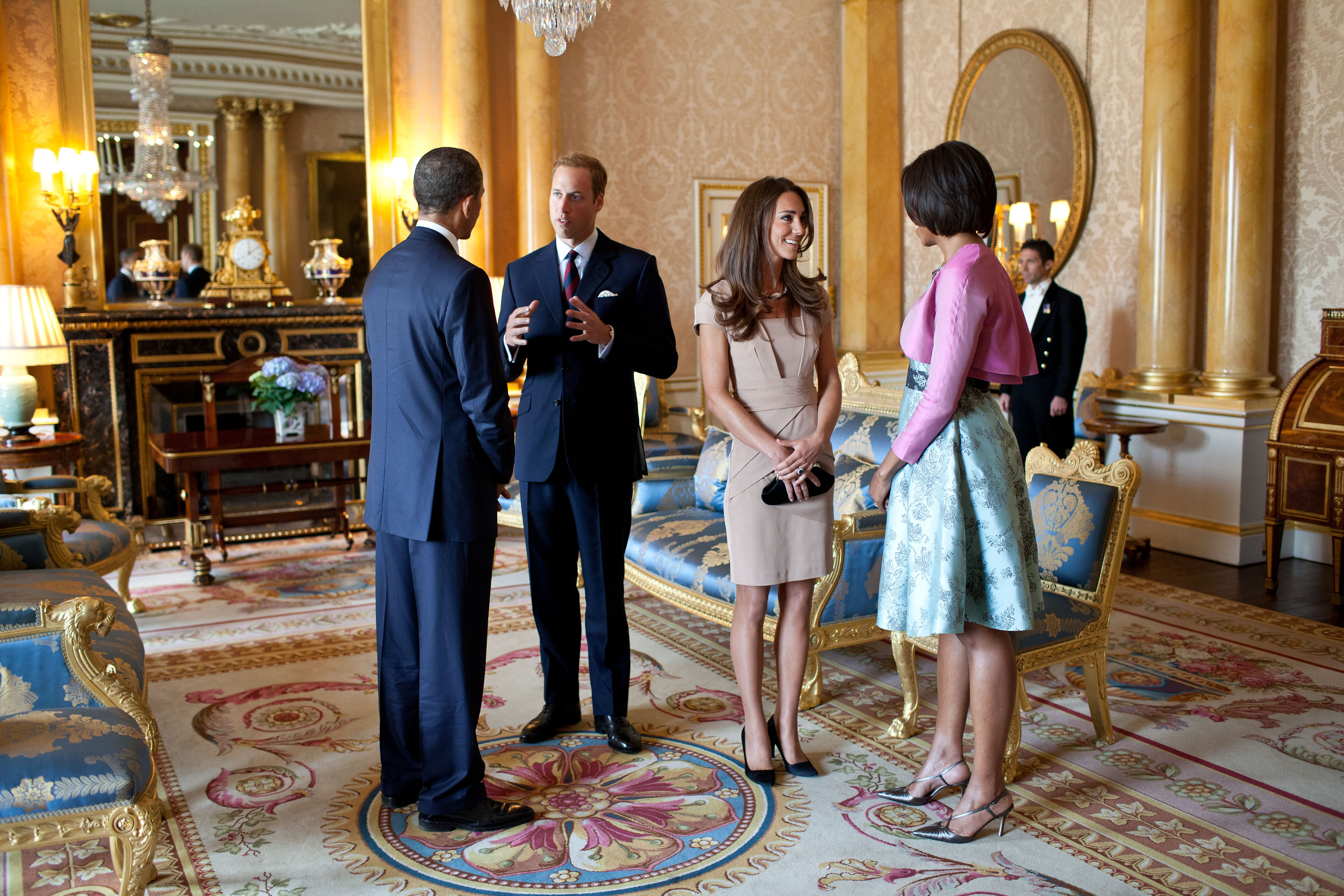
President Obama and the First Lady with the Duke and Duchess of Cambridge in the 1844 Room at Buckingham Palace

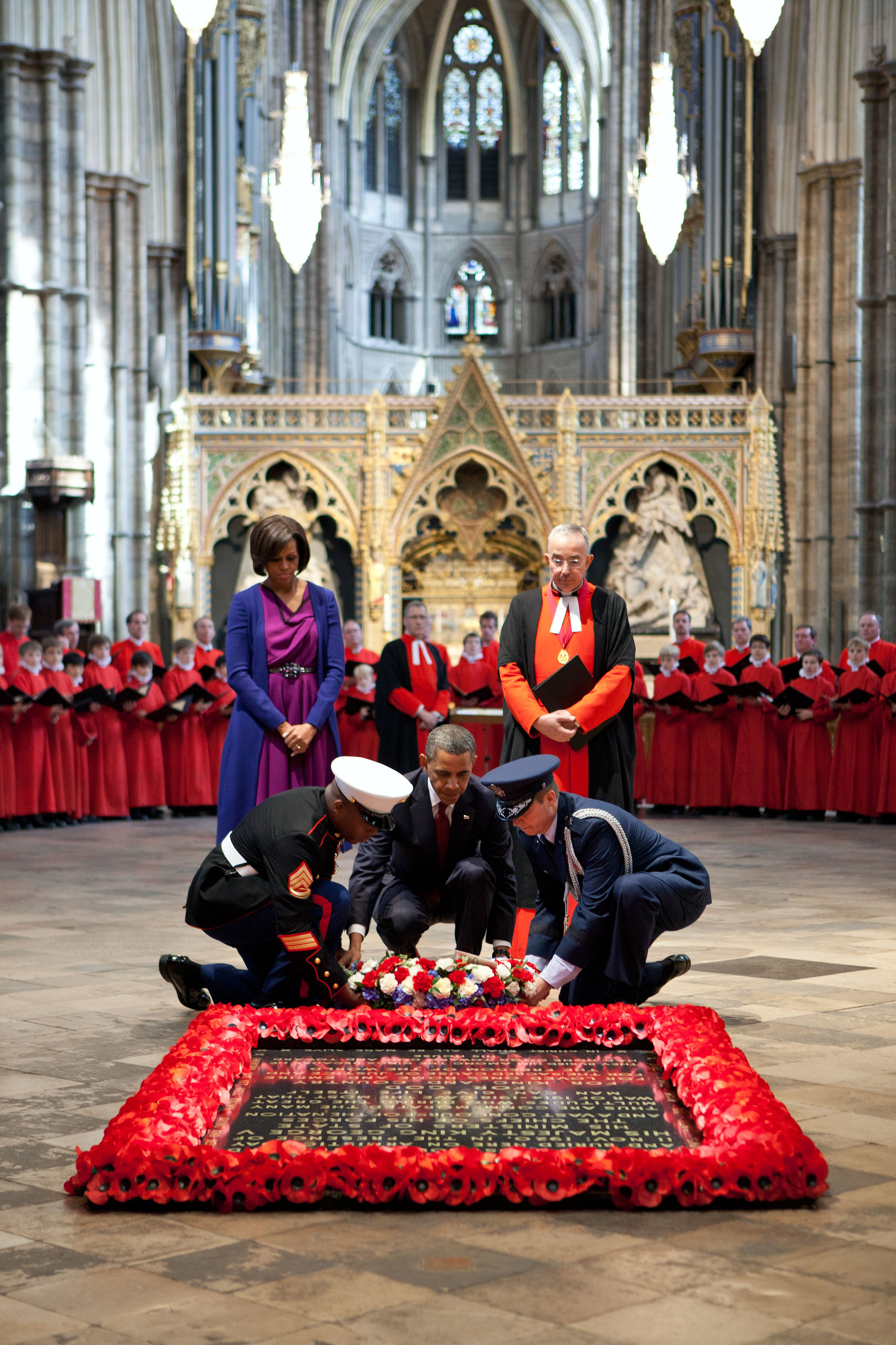
The President and the First Lady laying a wreath at the grave of the Unknown Warrior at Westminster Abbey

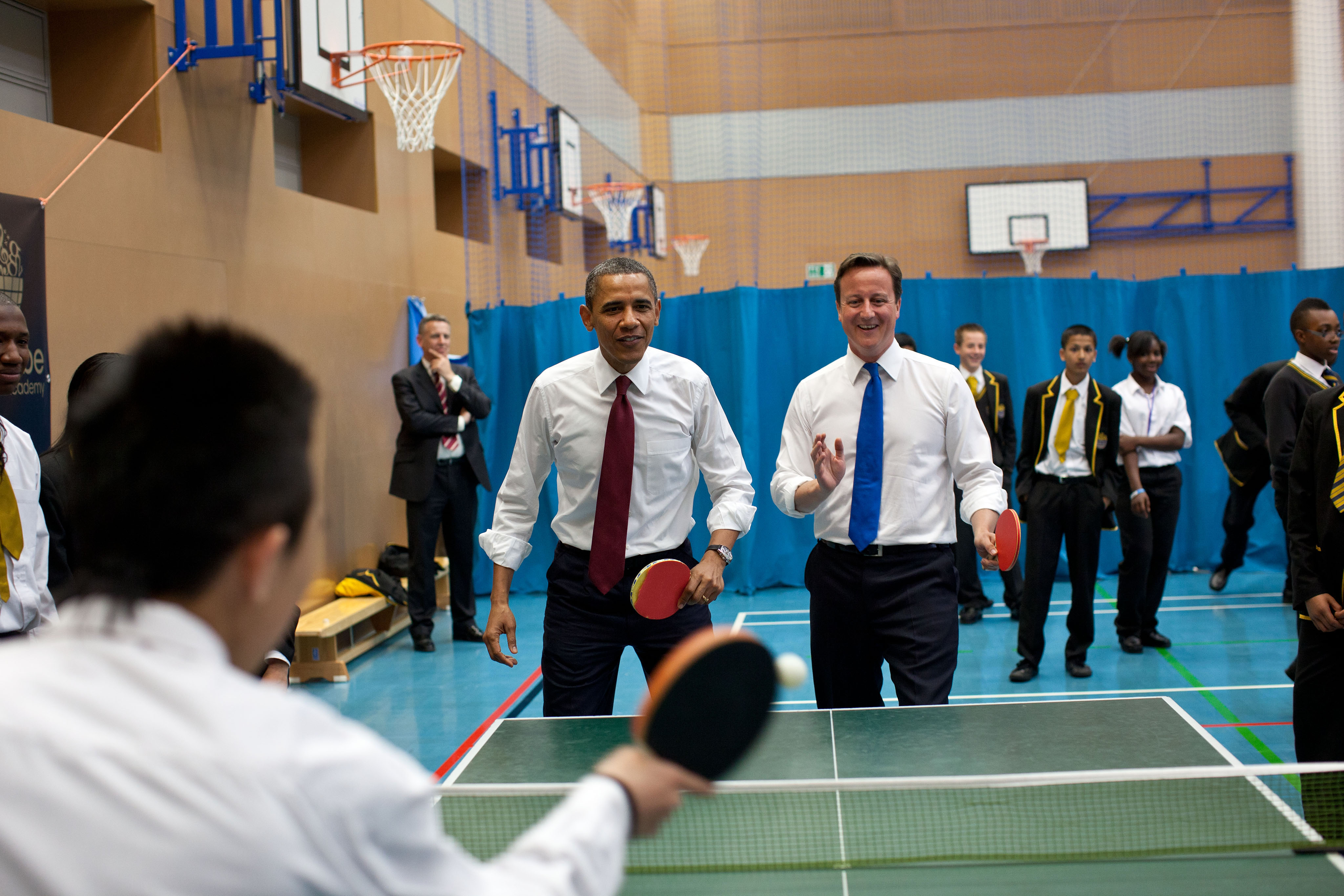
President Obama and Prime Minister David Cameron playing table tennis with students at Globe Academy

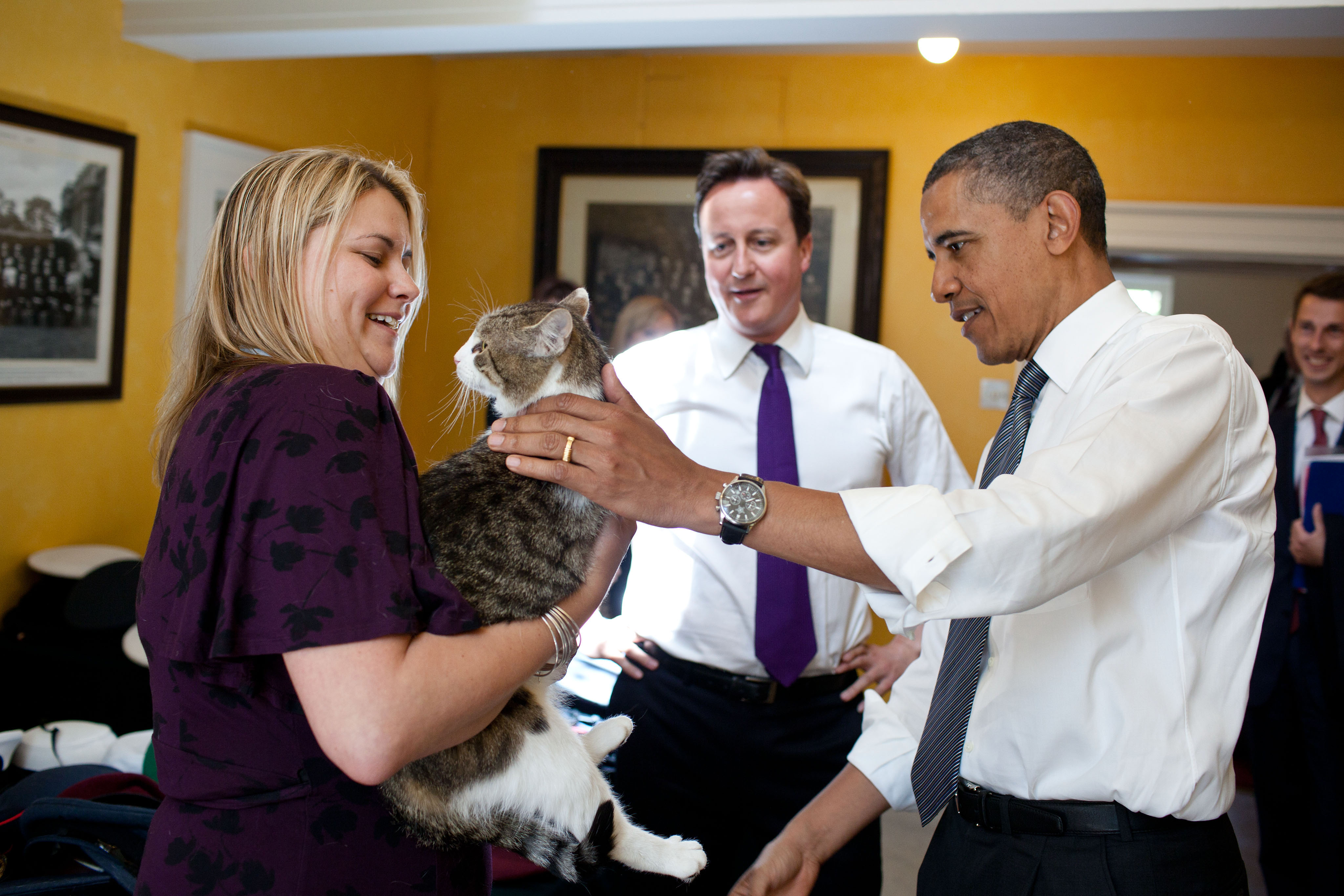
President Obama petting Larry, the Chief Mouser to the Cabinet Office, at 10 Downing Street as Prime Minister Cameron looks on

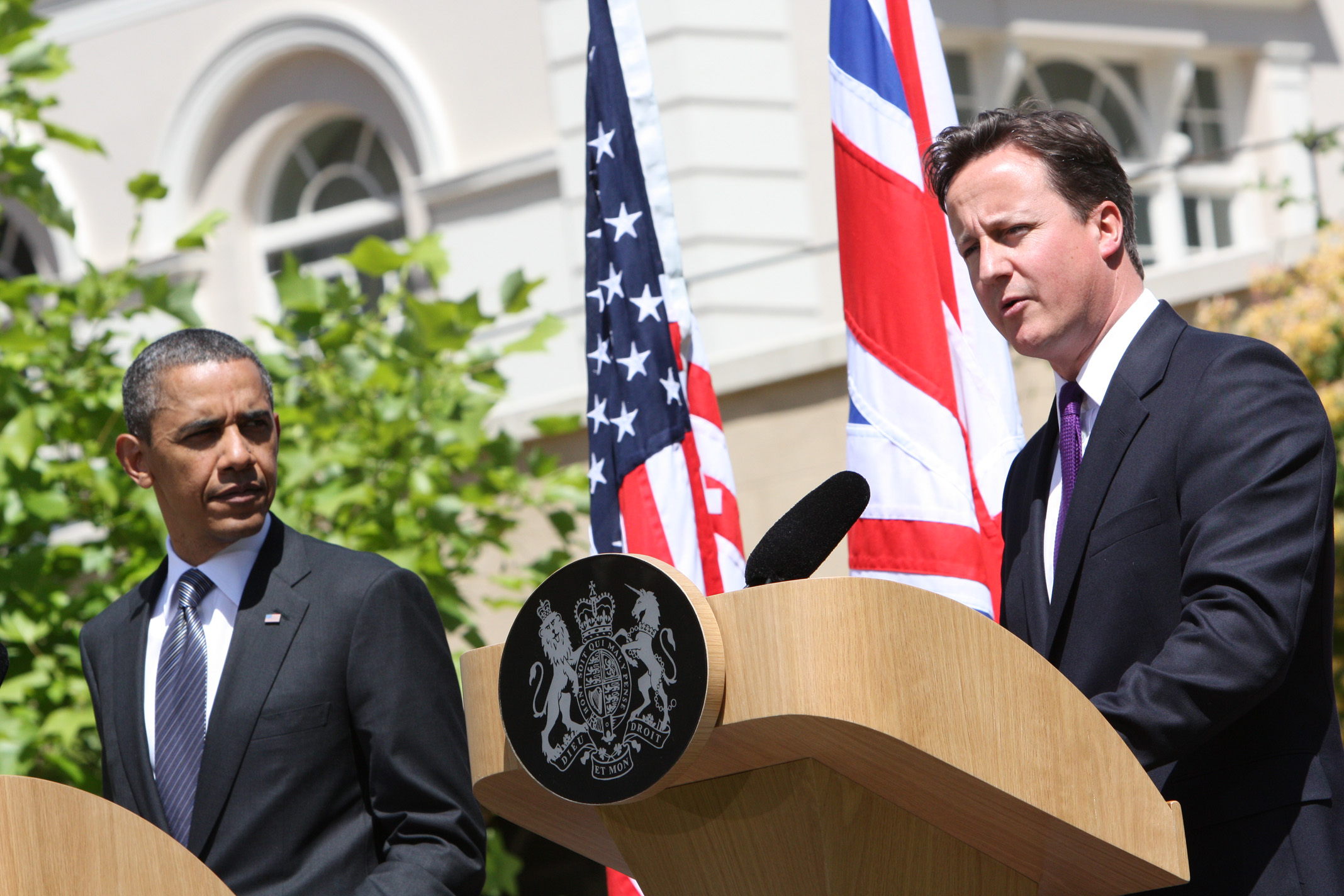
President Obama and Prime Minister Cameron holding a joint press conference at Lancaster House

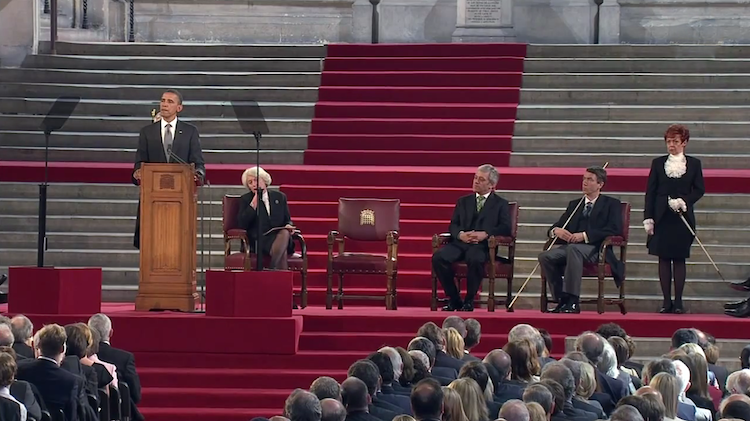
President Obama addressing both Houses of Parliament at Westminster Hall while the Lord Speaker, Speaker of the House of Commons and the Lord Great Chamberlain look on

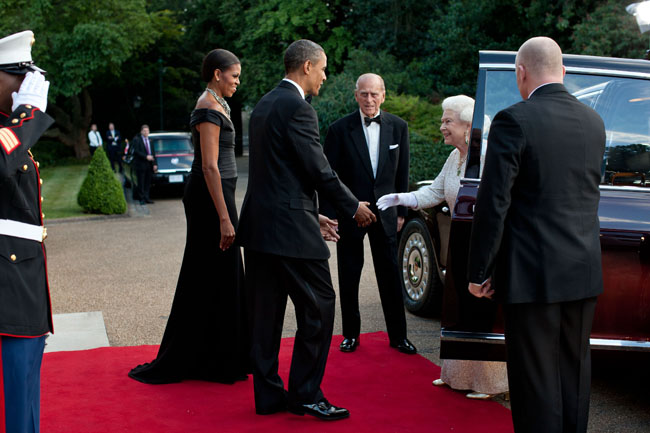
The President and the First Lady welcoming the Queen and the Duke of Edinburgh for dinner at Winfield House
