= Gladstone (cat) =

Former Chief Mouser of HM Treasury at Whitehall

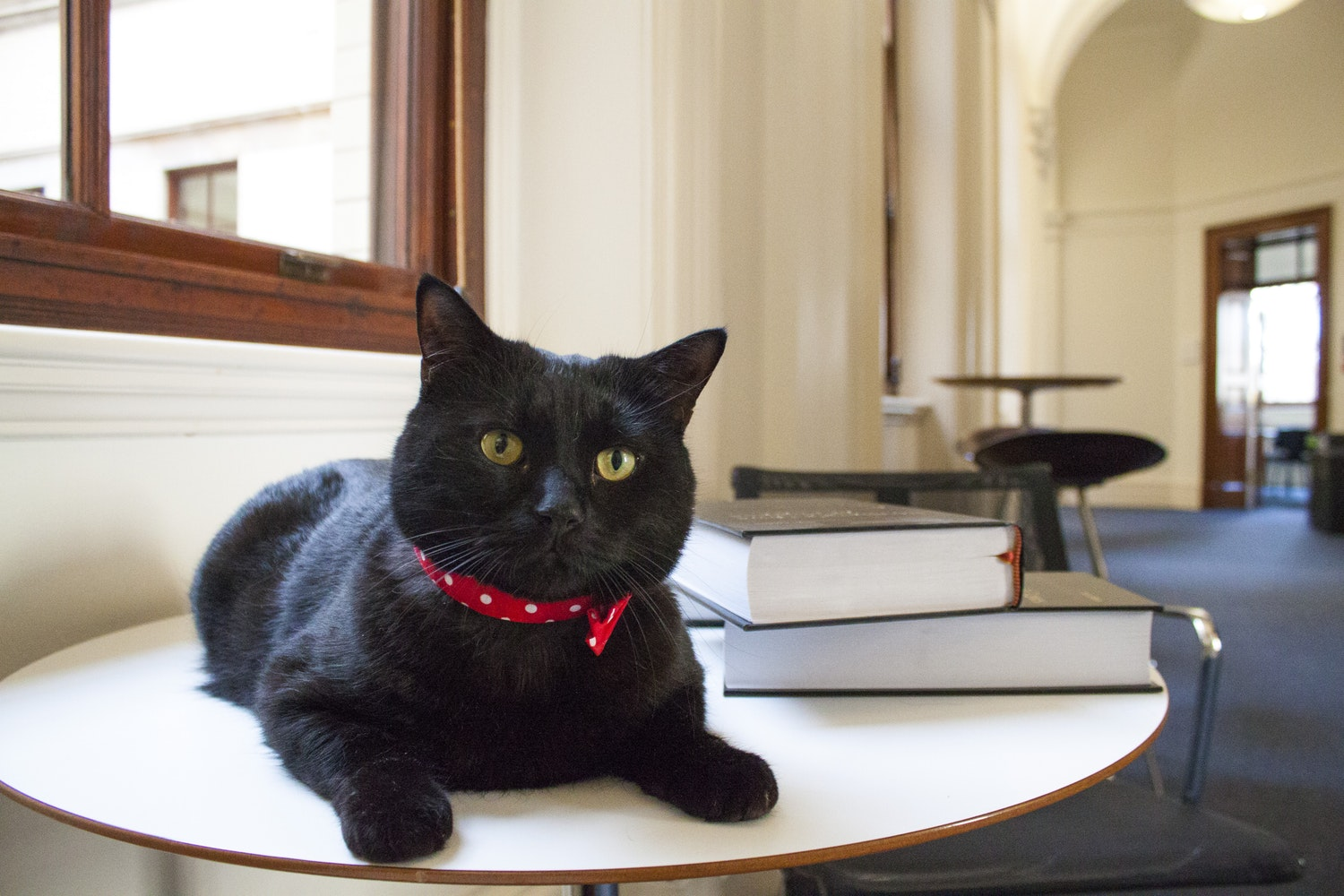
- Gladstone in 2017

Chief Mouser to HM Treasury
- In office 28 June 2016 – 22 December 2019
- Monarch: Elizabeth II
- Prime Minister: David Cameron; Theresa May; Boris Johnson
- Chancellor: George Osborne; Philip Hammond; Sajid Javid
- Preceded by: Position established
- Succeeded by: Vacant

Personal details
- Born: c. December 2014 (age 11) London, England
- Occupation: Mouser

Gladstone (born c. December 2014) is a cat who was the resident chief mouser to HM Treasury in Whitehall, London. He is a black domestic short-haired cat, who, at eighteen months old, assumed the position of chief mouser in late June 2016, a position which he served until December 2019. Gladstone's political namesake is former Chancellor and Prime Minister William Ewart Gladstone, who served for four separate periods, more than any other Chancellor. Gladstone was responsible for catching mice at the Treasury's 1 Horse Guards Road building. Gladstone retired in 2019.

The inception of the position of chief mouser at the Treasury followed the creation of similar positions at 10 Downing Street (Chief Mouser to the Cabinet Office) and the Foreign Office; those positions being held by Larry and Palmerston respectively, as of July 2016. The decision to introduce an official mouser was taken by John Kingman, former acting Permanent Secretary at the Treasury. The appointment of Gladstone as "Chief Mouser to the Treasury" was officially announced on 29 July 2016.

Gladstone was taken to his new home at the Treasury in late June 2016, but the fallout from the referendum on European Union membership delayed the public announcement until late July.

== Early life ==
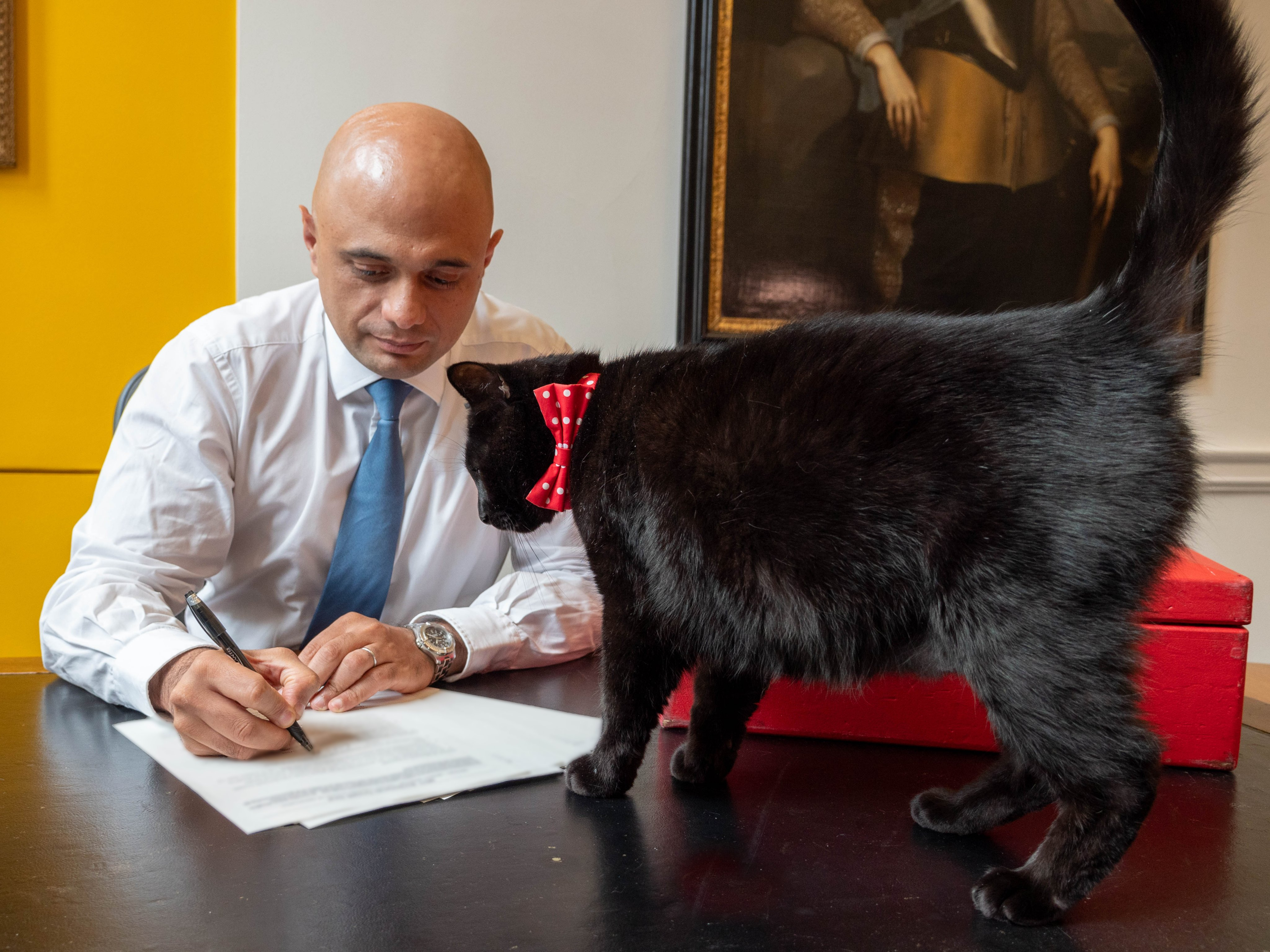
Chancellor Sajid Javid and Gladstone (2019).

Gladstone was brought in by a staff member of Battersea Dogs & Cats Home Lost and Found team in May 2016 as a neglected stray. He had been wandering the streets of London, hungry and without a microchip, so that his owners could not be located. At Battersea, he was known as Timmy. Like many homeless cats without daily access to food and water, he would eat too much, too quickly. A special activity puzzle feeder remedied this issue.

== Career ==
Within 48 hours of moving in, Gladstone made his first catch. Described as "a cold-blooded killer", he went on to register six catches in his first three months in office. Food for Gladstone is taken care of by Treasury staff, who volunteer the modest sums required for his daily needs. At weekends, the Treasury's facilities and security team look after his domestic needs and personal protection. His employment is at no cost to taxpayers.

=== Recognition ===
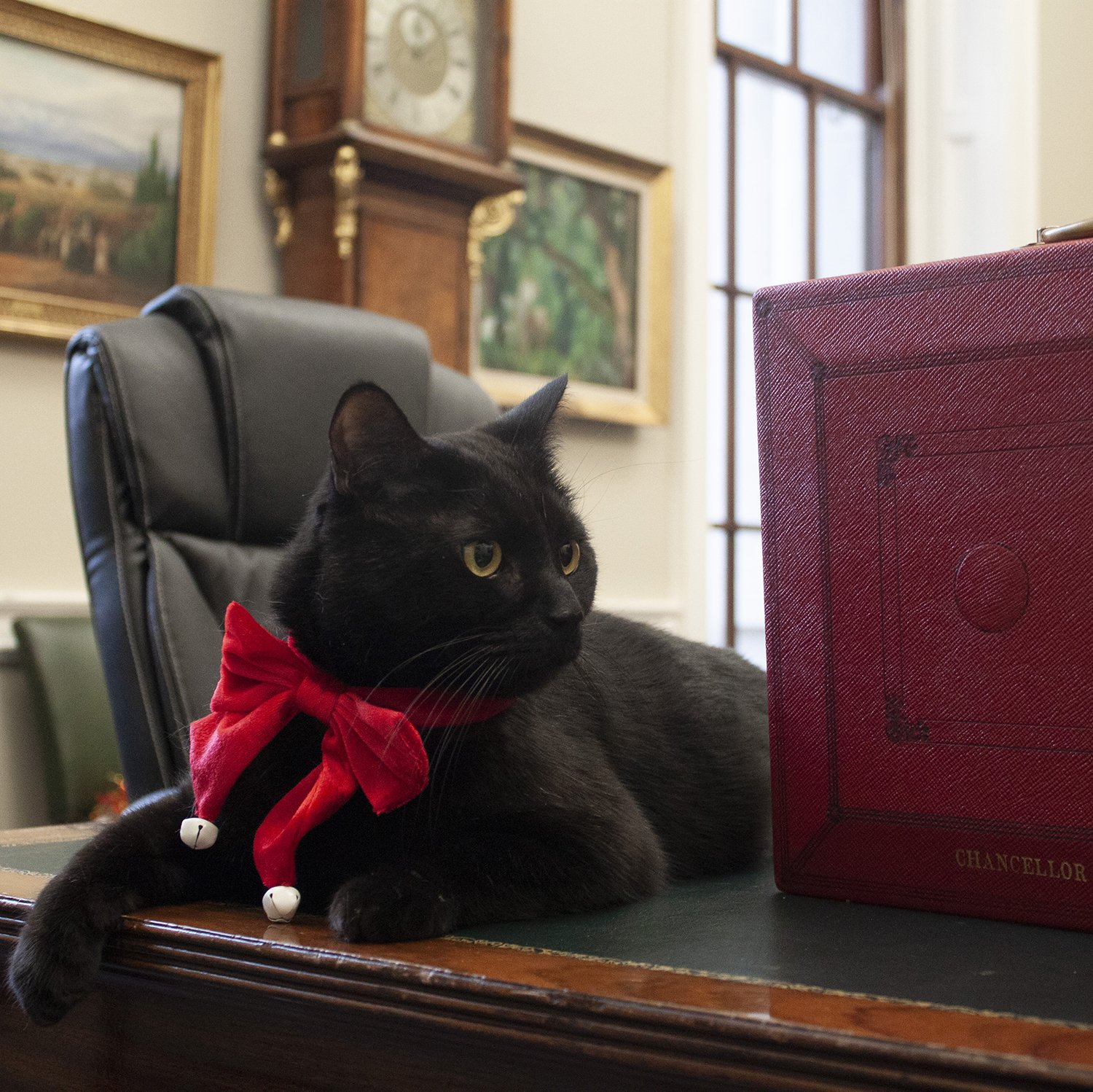
Gladstone sitting on a table on 2018 Christmas Eve

On 28 July 2017, Gladstone celebrated his first anniversary at HM Treasury. A few days after his debut on Instagram in July 2016, he had 1,200 followers. As of January 2023, the number is over 22,500, though his Instagram has not seen a new post since February 2020. 'A cat's life – after a year in the spotlight, Gladstone sets the record straight', details his life at the Treasury. As of 28 July 2017, Gladstone's number of mice caught was 22. No update has been given on this number.

=== Stepping back from duties ===
Gladstone retired in 2019. An official statement said "He is still alive, happy and well and living with an HMT staff member ... There are no plans to replace him with another cat". In January 2020 he was said to be working from home. In 2021, Peter Cardwell wrote for Your Cat magazine that "for health reasons, jet-black Gladstone has been out of the Treasury for a few months now in quieter surroundings". The response to a Freedom of Information request in 2024 confirmed that he had retired and moved out; in reply to a question about how many mice he had caught, the Treasury said that finding this out would take too much time and "would exceed the appropriate limit" for responding to Freedom of Information requests.

== In popular culture ==
Gladstone has a social media presence on an official Instagram page. He often receives trinkets such as cat toys, Christmas baubles from Brazil, a personalised collar, and a Halloween handmade knitted scarf from Australia. He appeared on the Treasury's official YouTube site, in 'Where's Gladstone Gone?', for 2016's Open House London, which also appeared on Sky News. In March 2017, Gladstone was featured in the London Time Out magazine's 'Pet Power List: definitive guide to the political animals of Westminster'.

== See also ==
- Chief Mouser to the Cabinet Office
- Palmerston, former Chief Mouser to the Foreign & Commonwealth Office
- List of individual cats

Honorary titles
New title	Chief Mouser to HM Treasury; 2016–2019	Succeeded by Vacant
