= Palmerston (cat) =

Cat owned by the UK's Foreign & Commonwealth Office (2014–2026)

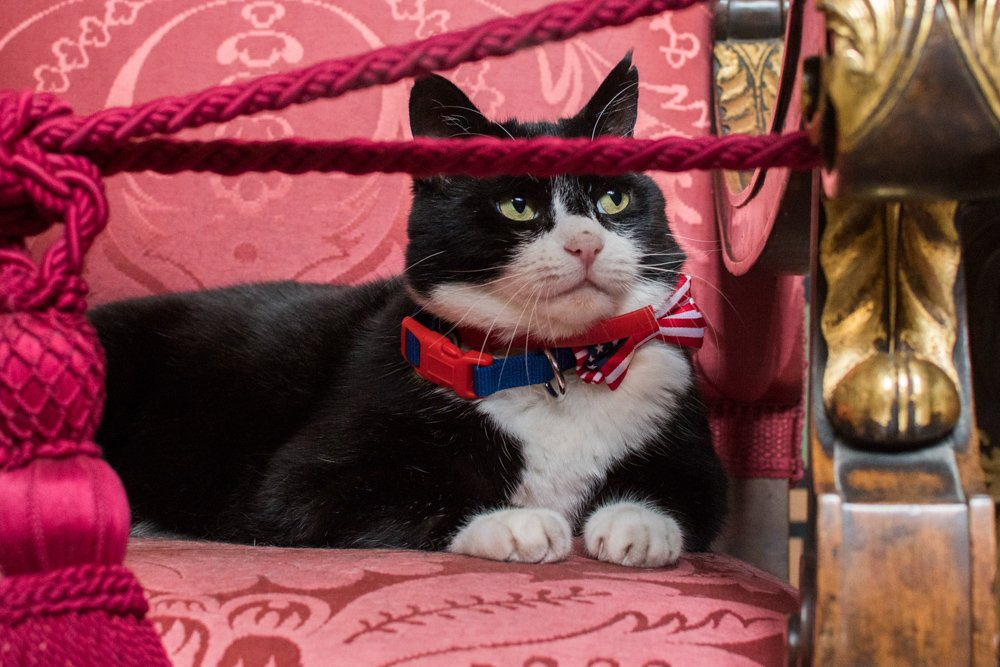
- Palmerston in 2017

Feline Relations Consultant to the Governor of Bermuda
- In office 3 February 2025 – 12 February 2026
- Governor: Andrew Murdoch
- Preceded by: Position established
- Succeeded by: Vacant

Chief Mouser to the Foreign & Commonwealth Office
- Held title 13 April 2016 – 7 August 2020
- Monarch: Elizabeth II
- Prime Minister: David Cameron; Theresa May; Boris Johnson
- Foreign Secretary: Philip Hammond; Boris Johnson; Jeremy Hunt; Dominic Raab
- Preceded by: Position established
- Succeeded by: Vacant

Personal details
- Born: 2014
- Died: 12 February 2026 (aged 11–12) Hamilton, Bermuda
- Occupation: Mouser
- Gender: Male
- Nickname: Palmy

Palmerston (2014 – 12 February 2026) was a black-and-white tuxedo cat who was the resident Chief Mouser to the UK's Foreign & Commonwealth Office. He held the role for four years, from 2016 until his retirement in 2020. He briefly came out of retirement in 2025, when he was taken to Bermuda with Andrew Murdoch, his owner since retirement, who had taken on the position of Governor of Bermuda.

== Biography ==
Palmerston was born in 2014. He was from Battersea Dogs & Cats Home and was named after the former Foreign Secretary and Prime Minister Lord Palmerston. In 2016, he began working as Chief Mouser to the Foreign & Commonwealth Office (FCO) at Whitehall in London, and was employed at the King Charles Street building.

The inception of the position of Chief Mouser to the FCO followed from the position Chief Mouser to the Cabinet Office, Larry, and from visits from George Osborne's cat Freya, who made regular visits to the office.

Palmerston was in the news on 3 May 2016, as it was reported that he had caught his first mouse. On 11 July 2016, Palmerston was caught on camera in a stand-off between himself and Larry in and around Downing Street. On 26 July 2016, Palmerston was caught sneaking into Number 10, when the black door was left open. He was later evicted by resident police. On 1 August 2016, a journalist caught Palmerston and Larry having a serious cat-fight, which led to Palmerston suffering damage to his ear and Larry losing his collar.

On 7 August 2020, Palmerston retired as the FCO's Chief Mouser, moving to the countryside to "spend more time relaxing away from the limelight"; his "resignation" was announced on Twitter.

On 3 February 2025, it was reported that Palmerston had come out of retirement to take up a role in Bermuda as "feline relations consultant" to the new Governor of Bermuda, Andrew Murdoch, who had owned Palmerston since his retirement.

Palmerston died on 12 February 2026.

== See also ==
- Chief Mouser to the Cabinet Office
- Gladstone (cat), Chief Mouser to HM Treasury (2016–2019)
- List of individual cats
