= Wilberforce (cat) =

Chief Mouser to the Cabinet Office, 1973 to 1987

- Wilberforce in Downing Street

Chief Mouser to the Cabinet Office
- In role 1973 – 3 April 1987
- Monarch: Elizabeth II
- Prime Minister: Edward Heath; Harold Wilson; James Callaghan; Margaret Thatcher
- Preceded by: Peta (c. 1976)
- Succeeded by: Humphrey (1989)

Personal details
- Born: c. 1973
- Died: 19 May 1988 (aged 15) Essex, England
- Occupation: Mouser

Wilberforce (c. 1973 – 19 May 1988) was a cat living at 10 Downing Street who was employed as the chief mouser to the Cabinet Office from 1973 to 1987. He served during the premierships of four prime ministers: Edward Heath, Harold Wilson, (Note: Wilberforce served during Wilson's second term.) James Callaghan and Margaret Thatcher. In obituaries published shortly after his death he was described as the "best mouser in Britain".

== Early life and career ==
Wilberforce was an eight-week-old white tabby kitten when adopted from the Hounslow branch of the Royal Society for the Prevention of Cruelty to Animals in 1973. He was appointed the Downing Street office manager's cat to deal with a mouse infestation, and given a living allowance. He was named Wilberforce in honour of the English abolitionist William Wilberforce. Downing Street staff would reply to mail sent to him "wanting to know how he was, [wishing] him luck". Despite his role as chief mouser to the Cabinet Office, he rarely visited the Cabinet room, instead preferring the Scottish Office, 11 Downing Street and the Foreign Office.

According to Bernard Ingham, the former Downing Street press secretary, the prime minister Margaret Thatcher once bought Wilberforce "a tin of sardines in a Moscow supermarket", because, according to The Daily Telegraph, "there was nothing else to buy". Wilberforce would regularly sleep on and under Ingham's desk, which irritated Ingham because of his asthma. When resident ducks from nearby St James's Park had eggs that were about to hatch Thatcher "made sure he [Wilberforce] was kept out of the way". During the BBC's coverage of the 1983 general election Esther Rantzen held Wilberforce and introduced him to viewers. Noting his longevity, in 1985 the Sunday Mirror stated that Wilberforce "seem[ed] to go on forever"; in December 1986, anticipating the 1987 general election, the Lincolnshire Echo said this of Wilberforce:

Governments may come and go, prime ministers may pass in the night, but Wilberforce goes on forever, untroubled by the mighty events that go on around her [sic] twitching whiskers.

== Retirement and death ==
Wilberforce retired on 3 April 1987 after fourteen years of service under four different prime ministers. He went to live in Essex with a retired caretaker from Number 10; before his departure, Thatcher gave Wilberforce a leaving gift. He died in his sleep on 19 May 1988, aged 15. Upon his death, Edward Heath, who was in Tokyo at the time, said that he was "very sorry that the longest resident has died". Harold Wilson, who had been "extremely fond" of Wilberforce, expressed his regrets; James Callaghan's wife Audrey was reportedly "shocked". (Note: Callaghan was flying back to Britain from Moscow that night, and was unaware of Wilberforce's death.) Thatcher was given the news of his death at the end of the daily Cabinet meeting, and stated that she was "very sad". In various newspaper stories and obituaries covering his death, Wilberforce was described as the "best mouser in Britain". He was buried near his retirement home.

== See also ==
- List of individual cats
