= Humphrey (cat) =

Chief Mouser to the Cabinet Office from 1989 to 1997

- Humphrey after his retirement

9th Chief Mouser to the Cabinet Office
- In role October 1989 – 13 November 1997
- Monarch: Elizabeth II
- Prime Minister: Margaret Thatcher; John Major; Tony Blair
- Preceded by: Wilberforce (1987)
- Succeeded by: Sybil (2007)

Personal details
- Born: c. 1988 London
- Died: March 2006 (aged 17–18) London
- Occupation: Mouser
- Gender: Male

Humphrey (c. 1988 – March 2006) was a cat employed as the chief mouser to the Cabinet Office at 10 Downing Street from October 1989 to 13 November 1997. Arriving as a one-year-old stray, he served under the premierships of Margaret Thatcher, John Major and Tony Blair, retiring six months after the Blairs moved into Downing Street. He was the successor to Wilberforce. Humphrey was frequently referred to in jest by the press as an actual employee at Number 10.

== Career ==
Humphrey was found as a stray by a Cabinet Office civil servant and named in honour of Humphrey Appleby, the archetypal civil servant of Yes Minister and Yes, Prime Minister. After the death of the previous mouser, Wilberforce, in 1988, the Cabinet Office and Number 10 were in need of a replacement and so Humphrey began his work. At a cost of about £100 a year (paid for from the Cabinet Office's budget), most of which went towards food, Humphrey was said to be of considerably better value than the Cabinet's professional pest controller, who charged £4,000 a year and is reported to have never caught a mouse.

Frequently pictured posing by the famous Number 10 front door, Humphrey's primary duties involved catching mice and rats in the maze of Downing Street buildings. The poor quality of the buildings, some of which date from the 16th century, and the nearby St. James's Park ensure a continuous vermin problem. By the time of his retirement, Humphrey had risen to the position of Chief Mouser to the Cabinet Office. In November 1993, an internal memo was circulated in the Cabinet Office informing staff that Humphrey was suffering from a minor kidney complaint and had been put on a special diet. A ban on feeding him treats was instituted.

Humphrey was accused on 7 June 1994 of having killed four robin chicks which were nesting in a window box outside the office of John Major, then Prime Minister. However, Major exonerated him the next day, declaring, "I am afraid Humphrey has been falsely accused." It was not until March 2006 that he was finally cleared: journalist George Jones of The Daily Telegraph admitted that his piece in the paper's diary column had been no more than "journalistic licence" printed with no supporting evidence. In September 1994, Humphrey was found in St James's Park and was blamed for having "savaged" a duck there earlier in the year.

In June 1995, Humphrey went missing. Downing Street did not disclose the fact until it was mentioned to Sheila Gunn, a journalist on The Times, after Gunn told a member of staff that her own cat had died. Gunn's story was mentioned on the front page. The publicity led to his rediscovery in the nearby Royal Army Medical College, where he had been taken in as a presumed stray and renamed PC, short for "patrol cat". Upon his return, Humphrey issued a statement through the civil service: "I have had a wonderful holiday at the Royal Army Medical College, but it is nice to be back and I am looking forward to the new parliamentary session."

Within a week of Tony Blair moving to 10 Downing Street after the May 1997 general election, there were press reports of a rift between Humphrey and Cherie Blair, the new Prime Minister's wife. Cherie Blair was reported either to be allergic to cats or to believe them to be unhygienic. Sheila Gunn, who had gone on to be John Major's press advisor, later admitted that she was the source of these reports, which her obituary says were based "on a hunch for which she had no evidence".

At the time, a spokesperson insisted that Humphrey would not be moving out, stating that Number 10 "is Humphrey's home and, as far as the Blairs are concerned, it will remain his home". A photo of Humphrey and Cherie Blair was released, though this did little to allay fears that he would be forced out. It was later alleged that Humphrey was sedated by press secretary Alastair Campbell before undergoing the ordeal. The photo was used on the cover of Private Eye with Humphrey stating "I am going to hit the mouse running" a paraphrase of a New Labourism. In November 1997, Humphrey's primary carer, Jonathan Rees, who worked in the Prime Minister's Policy Unit, wrote a memo stating that the cat should retire to a "stable home environment where he can be looked after properly".

== Retirement ==
Humphrey moved to his new home with an elderly couple in suburban London on 13 November 1997, though his retirement was not announced until the next day to reduce the risk of kidnap attempts. The Conservatives were quick to point out that Humphrey lived happily at Number 10 for almost eight years under a Conservative government but moved out within six months of Labour taking power. Conservative MP and animal lover Alan Clark was suspicious about the way Humphrey's retirement was announced and demanded proof that the cat was still alive: "Humphrey is now a missing person. Unless I hear from him or he makes a public appearance, I suspect he has been shot." This led to rumours that Humphrey had been put down on the orders of Cherie Blair. The Prime Minister's office insisted that veterinary advice was behind the decision to remove Humphrey from Downing Street, and on 24 November 1997 a group of journalists were taken to a secret location in south London and shown that Humphrey was still alive and well. Pictures of the cat posing with copies of the day's newspapers were published and reports indicated that he had put on weight.

Little was heard about Humphrey over the next few years, leading many to infer that he had died. The Daily Telegraph made a Freedom of Information Act request for documents relating to him in early 2005, which led to more information about his time at Downing Street coming to light. In March 2005, in its report about Humphrey, the Telegraph lamented "Where Humphrey is now – or even whether he is still with us – remains a mystery. 'I am not having much luck,' a Cabinet Office spokesman confessed last night. His official minder has not heard from him in seven years." However, on 22 July 2005, The Independent reported that "the 17 year old mouser is alive and well and living in South London." No further details were given in the text, which was part of a larger feature about celebrity pets. In March 2006, a spokesman for Tony Blair reported that Humphrey had died during the previous week, at the home of the Cabinet Office worker who had been accommodating him.

== In popular culture ==
In August 2012, the BBC Radio 4 dramatic series Political Animals featured Humphrey, focusing on the Blair years. Humphrey also appeared in the political satire Spitting Image, portrayed as a cat who would irritate John Major by criticising the government. This would lead to a confrontation between Humphrey and Major, resulting in Major knocking Humphrey unconscious with a frying pan.

== See also ==
- List of individual cats
