= Freya (cat) =

Chief Mouser to the Cabinet Office, 2012–2014

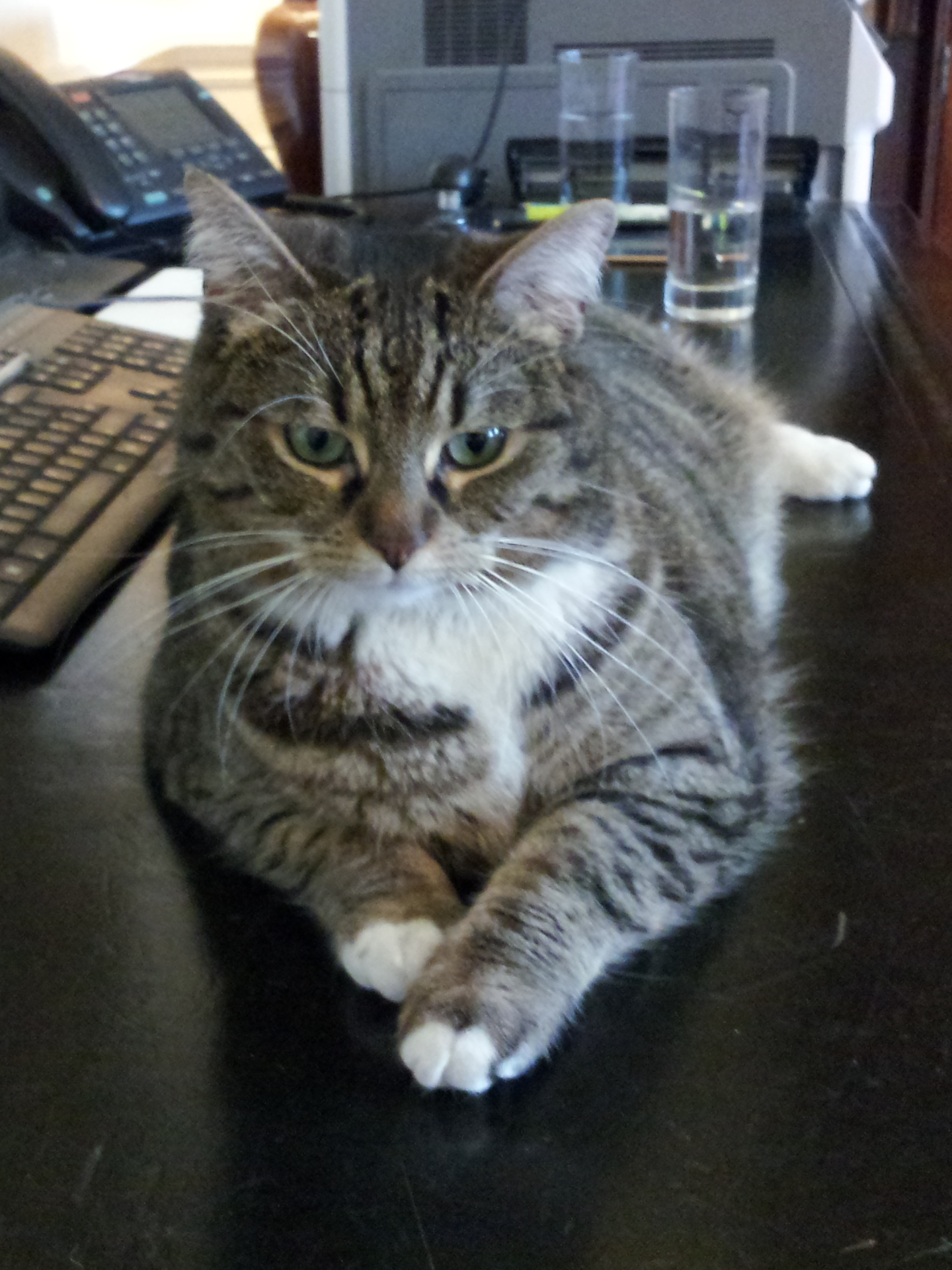
- Freya in 2012

Chief Mouser to the Cabinet Office
- In role 16 September 2012 – 9 November 2014 Serving with Larry
- Monarch: Elizabeth II
- Prime Minister: David Cameron
- Preceded by: Sybil (2009)
- Succeeded by: Larry

Personal details
- Born: c. April 2009 London
- Died: 4 August 2022 (aged 13) London
- Occupation: Mouser
- Gender: Female
- Owned by: George Osborne
- Namesake: Freyja

Freya (c. April 2009 – 4 August 2022) was a cat who was employed as the Chief Mouser to the Cabinet Office from 2012 to 2014 as the pet of the chancellor of the Exchequer, George Osborne, and his family.

In September 2012, Freya shared the role of chief mouser to the Cabinet Office with Larry. In November 2014, she was retired from the position to the Kent countryside but ended up staying in the Oval area of London. She died in August 2022, aged 13.

== Life and career ==
Freya went missing from the Osbornes' house in Notting Hill when she was just a few months old, and after searching West London for her, the family assumed she had died or had become lost. In June 2012, Osborne's wife Frances received a call telling her that Freya was alive, and the family brought her home.

On 16 September 2012, Nigel Nelson from The People reported that the prime minister, David Cameron, had sacked Larry from his position as chief mouser to the Cabinet Office and installed Freya instead. Nelson claimed that Cameron had become fed up with Larry's laziness. Nelson explained:

The final straw came on Thursday when Mr Cameron caught Larry cat-napping on his chair in his No.10 study as another mouse scurried across the room. When he tried to wake Larry to do his duty one eye opened but the moggy wouldn't budge.

Cameron drafted in Freya to patrol Numbers 10, 11 and 12 Downing Street as she was a "tougher" and a "more street-wise predator." Freya was reported to be the more dominant cat over Larry and a more effective mouser, reportedly because her time as a stray had "hardened" her.

In October 2012, police had to break up a fight between Larry and Freya outside Number 10. The Daily Telegraph reported that Freya "appeared to have the best of the confrontation". The prime minister's spokeswoman stated that Freya and Larry were able to "co-exist" and added that she would not comment further on the two cats' adventures.

In May 2014, Freya strayed over a mile from Downing Street and had to be rescued and returned by a charity worker. In August 2014, Freya was hit by a car in Whitehall and was subsequently treated by a vet. Osborne said that he was "very grateful" to those who came to the aid of his pet. Following these events, Freya was sent to the Kent countryside to allow her to exercise her desire to roam. In February 2015 she moved to the Oval area of London, to live with the Head of Government Hospitality, Robert Alexander.

Alexander tweeted that Freya died on 4 August 2022, at the age of 13.

== See also ==
- List of individual cats
