= Ragamuffin cat =

Breed of cat

Ragamuffin
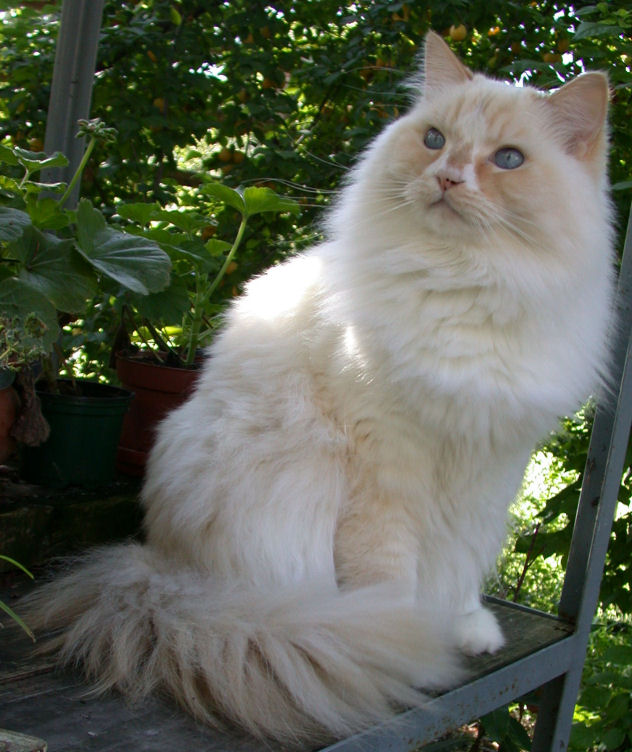
- A peach/light orange Ragamuffin on a chair in a garden
- Origin: United States

Breed standards
- CFA: standard
- ACFA/CAA: standard
- GCCF: standard

The Ragamuffin is a breed of domestic cat. It was once considered to be a variant of the Ragdoll cat but was established as a separate breed in 1994. Ragamuffins are notable for their friendly personalities and thick fur.

== General description ==
The physical traits of the breed include a rectangular, broad-chested body with shoulders supporting a short neck. These cats are classified as having heavy bones and a "substantial" body type.

The head is a broad, modified wedge with a moderately rounded forehead with short or medium-short muzzle and an obvious nose dip. The muzzle is wide with puffy whisker pads. The body should appear rectangular with a broad chest and broad shoulders and moderately heavy muscling in the hindquarters, with the hindquarters being equally broad as the shoulders. A tendency toward a fatty pad in the lower abdomen is expected.

Fur length is to be slightly longer around the neck and outer edges of the face, resulting in the appearance of a ruff. Texture is to be soft, dense and silky. Ragamuffin kittens are usually born white and develop a color pattern as they mature. Every color and pattern is allowable, with or without white. Their coats can be solid color, stripes, spots or patches of white, black, blue, red, cream, chocolate, lilac, cinnamon, seal brown or mixed colors. Their eyes can be any solid color, with some exhibiting heterochromia.

== History ==
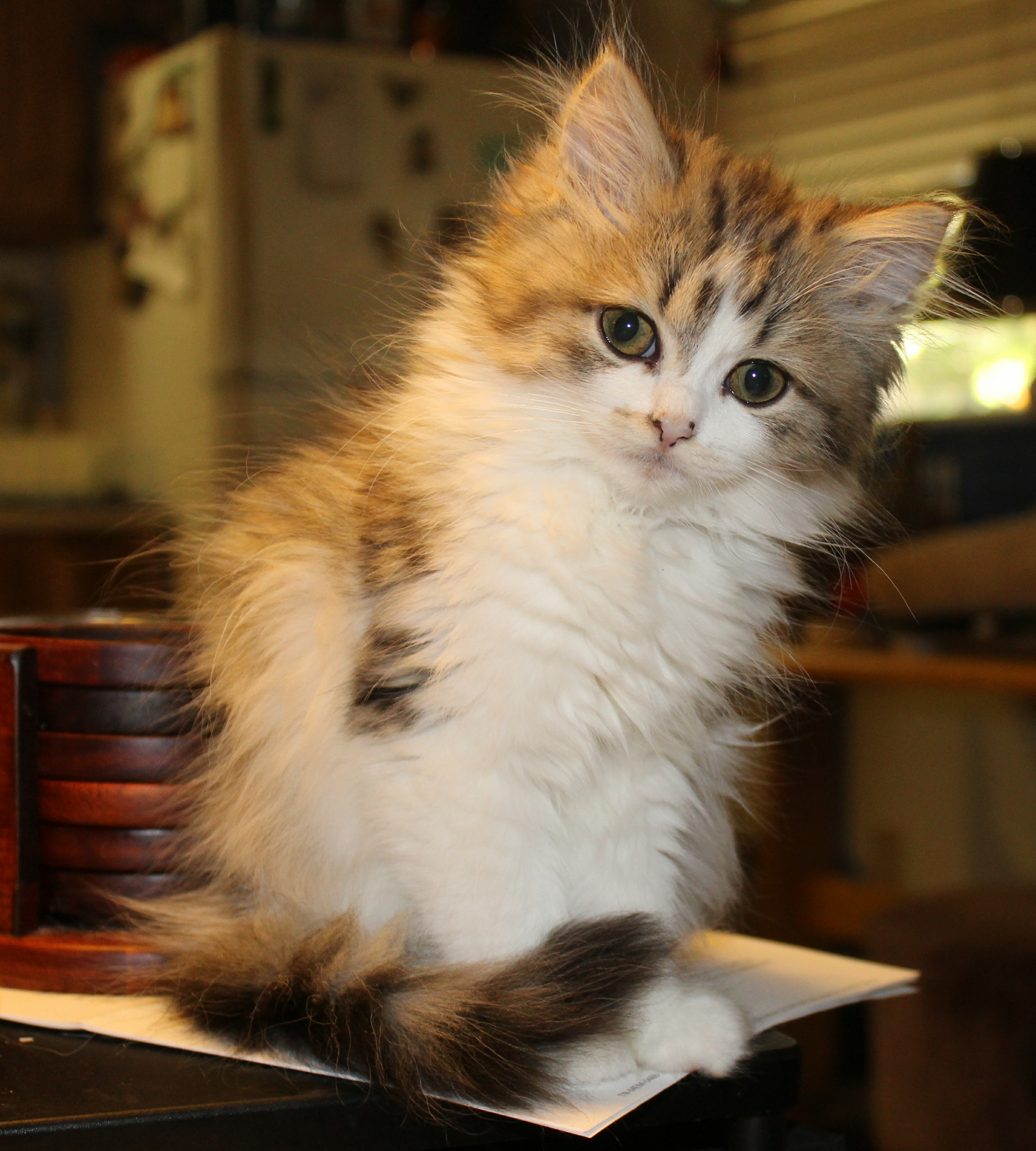
A bicolor tabby Ragamuffin kitten

The IRCA Cherubim Cats developed from 1971 to 1994 (23 years) were used as the foundation cats for the Ragamuffin breed and included the IRCA Miracle Ragdolls, Ragdolls, Honey Bears, and Maxamillion lines.

In contrast, their cousin the Ragdoll breed was founded with only the IRCA Ragdoll lines developed from 1971 to 1975 (4 years).

Currently, acceptable outcrossings are as follows: ACFA (Siberian), CFA (Long Haired Selkirk Rex, Straight), GCCF (British Longhair).

=== Ragamuffin background ===
Ragamuffins originated from the Ragdoll breed in the 1960s by Ann Baker in California. Originally one of the characteristics of the Ragdoll was its tendency to be limp and comfortable when handled, and it was from these characteristics that it got its name. A group of Ragdoll breeders aspired to create a breed that would keep the positive features of the Ragdoll while allowing for more breeding freedom. This breed was created in an effort to achieve this purpose. Thus, the Ragamuffin breed came into existence with its nature along with a wide range of colors and patterns. Today these cats bring charm and love to households worldwide as a combination.

In 1975, after a group of IRCA Ragdoll breeders left, Baker decided to spurn traditional cat breeding associations. She trademarked the name "Ragdoll" and "Cherubim" and set up her own registry, International Ragdoll Cat Association (IRCA). Baker imposed stringent standards on anyone who wanted to breed or sell cats under that name. The IRCA Ragdolls were also not allowed to be registered in other breed associations.

=== Breed divergence ===
In 1994, a group of IRCA breeders decided to leave and form their own group because of the increasing restrictions. Owing to Baker's trademark on the name Ragdoll and Cherubim, the group renamed its stock of IRCA Cherubim Cats Ragamuffins. While the originally proposed name was Liebling, the name Ragamuffin was put forth as an alternative by Curt Gehm, one of the group's founders, and it was chosen.

In the spirit of improving the breed's genetic health, personality, and temperament, the group selectively allowed a limited amount of outcross to Domestic Longhair cats that appeared to already fit the Standard of Perfection established in ACFA. Later, once the Domestic Longhair Cat allowance expired, outcrosses allowed historically include Persians. The group also allowed some limited outcrossing to IRCA Ragdolls initially (ended in 2010 for ACFA-recognized Ragamuffins). Only cats with at least one Ragamuffin parent and an accepted outcross in ACFA/CFA/GCCF currently qualify to be called Authentic Ragamuffins. (Cat Fanciers' Association, American Cat Fanciers Association, Governing Council of the Cat Fancy.)

The first cat association to accept the breed at full show champion status was the United Feline Organization (UFO), and shortly that same year it was accepted into the American Cat Fanciers Association (ACFA). Finally, the Cat Fanciers' Association (CFA) accepted them into the Miscellaneous class in February 2003 and advanced them to Championship class in February 2011.

The most obvious difference between typical Ragamuffins and Ragdolls is the required point coloration in Ragdolls, where as the Ragamuffin is allowed any color and pattern. The Standard of Perfection describes the Ragamuffin as requiring a 'sweet' overall expression with large, rounded, walnut-shaped eyes with a pinch at the corner versus the Ragdoll's thinner, slightly angled almond-shaped eyes. Adding to the sweet expression, Ragamuffins have rounded contours between the ears and a nose scoop versus the Ragdoll which calls for flat planes. Ragamuffins call for a flatter topline and Ragdolls call for a more angular topline with the raised hind quarter. Ragamuffin coats are to be plush in texture and the Ragdoll allows for both silky or plush coats.

== Color forms ==
Ragamuffins come in all patterns and colors, although colorpoints are permitted to be registered and bred they are not allowed to be shown in CFA or GCCF. Their eyes can be any solid color, with some exhibiting heterochromia.
