= Sybil (cat) =

Chief Mouser to the Cabinet Office from 2007 to 2008

- Sybil in 2007

Chief Mouser to the Cabinet Office
- In role 11 September 2007 – February 2008
- Monarch: Elizabeth II
- Prime Minister: Gordon Brown
- Preceded by: Humphrey (1997)
- Succeeded by: Larry (2011)

Personal details
- Born: c. 1999 Edinburgh, Scotland
- Died: 27 July 2009 (aged 9 or 10) London, England
- Occupation: Mouser
- Owners: Alistair Darling; Margaret Vaughan
- Named after: Sybil Fawlty

Sybil (c. 1999 – 27 July 2009) was a cat living at 10 and 11 Downing Street who was employed as the Chief Mouser to the Cabinet Office and pet of the chancellor of the Exchequer, Alistair Darling and his wife, Margaret. When introduced in September 2007, Sybil was the first cat employed at Downing Street as chief mouser since Humphrey, who retired in November 1997.

== Early life and career ==
Sybil was born around 1999 (Note: In September 2007 The Daily Telegraph stated Sybil's age as eight years old.) and was named after Sybil Fawlty, a character in the BBC sitcom Fawlty Towers. Several publications described her as being of Scottish origin. She was moved from the chancellor of the Exchequer Alistair Darling's family residence in Edinburgh to 11 Downing Street in the summer of 2007, and employed as chief mouser to the Cabinet Office in September of that year. A spokesman for the prime minister, Gordon Brown, said in a press briefing that he "[understood] Mr and Mrs Darling have a cat and it has recently been brought to Downing Street", and that Brown and his wife, Sarah, "do not have a problem with it".

=== Work as chief mouser ===
Unlike her predecessor Humphrey, who was given £100 per year after his retirement, Sybil did not receive any money from the Cabinet Office to cover food and veterinary costs, with the Darlings covering those expenses. Sybil was the first cat at Downing Street since Humphrey was removed in November 1997, possibly because of Cherie Blair's reported aversion to cats. Upon her arrival The Daily Telegraph stated that those who had written to the Treasury concerning Sybil's welfare had received a "souvenir photo" of her in return.

On 13 September 2007, two days after her introduction, former prime minister Margaret Thatcher met Sybil during a visit to 10 Downing Street. In March 2008 Sybil was prohibited from hunting mice in the Treasury because of maintenance regulations restricting the use of animals for pest control.

== Retirement and death ==
Six months after moving to Downing Street, Sybil, who did not adjust well to life in central London, was moved to the home of one of the Darling family's friends in London. On 27 July 2009, she died after a short illness; the chancellor's spokeswoman announced that Sybil had died at the Darlings' friend's home in London.

== See also ==
- List of individual cats
