= Chief Mouser to the Cabinet Office =

Resident cat at 10 Downing Street, London

- Royal Arms of His Majesty's Government

- Flag of the United Kingdom

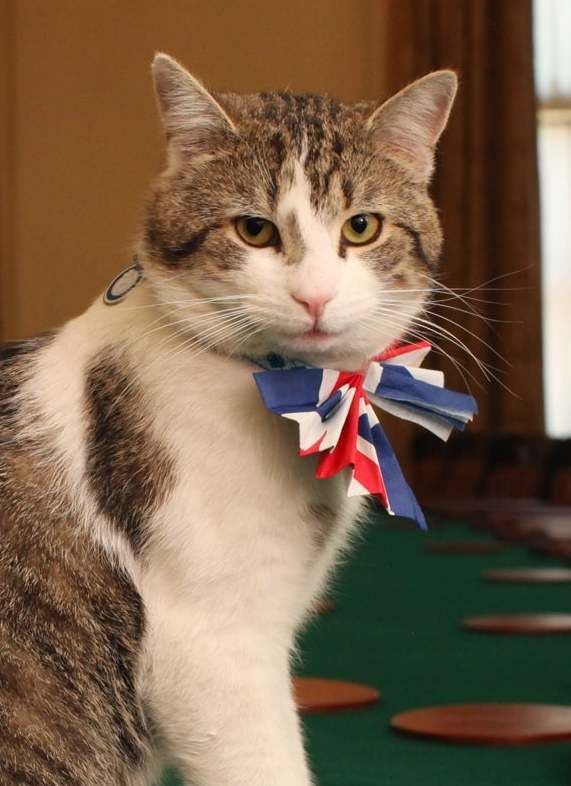
- Incumbent; Larry since 15 February 2011
- Government of the United Kingdom; Prime Minister's Office; Cabinet Office
- Residence: 10 Downing Street
- Appointer: Prime Minister of the United Kingdom
- Term length: No set length; ends on retirement or death
- Formation: 22 January 1924 (de facto); 1929 (de jure)
- Website: Official website

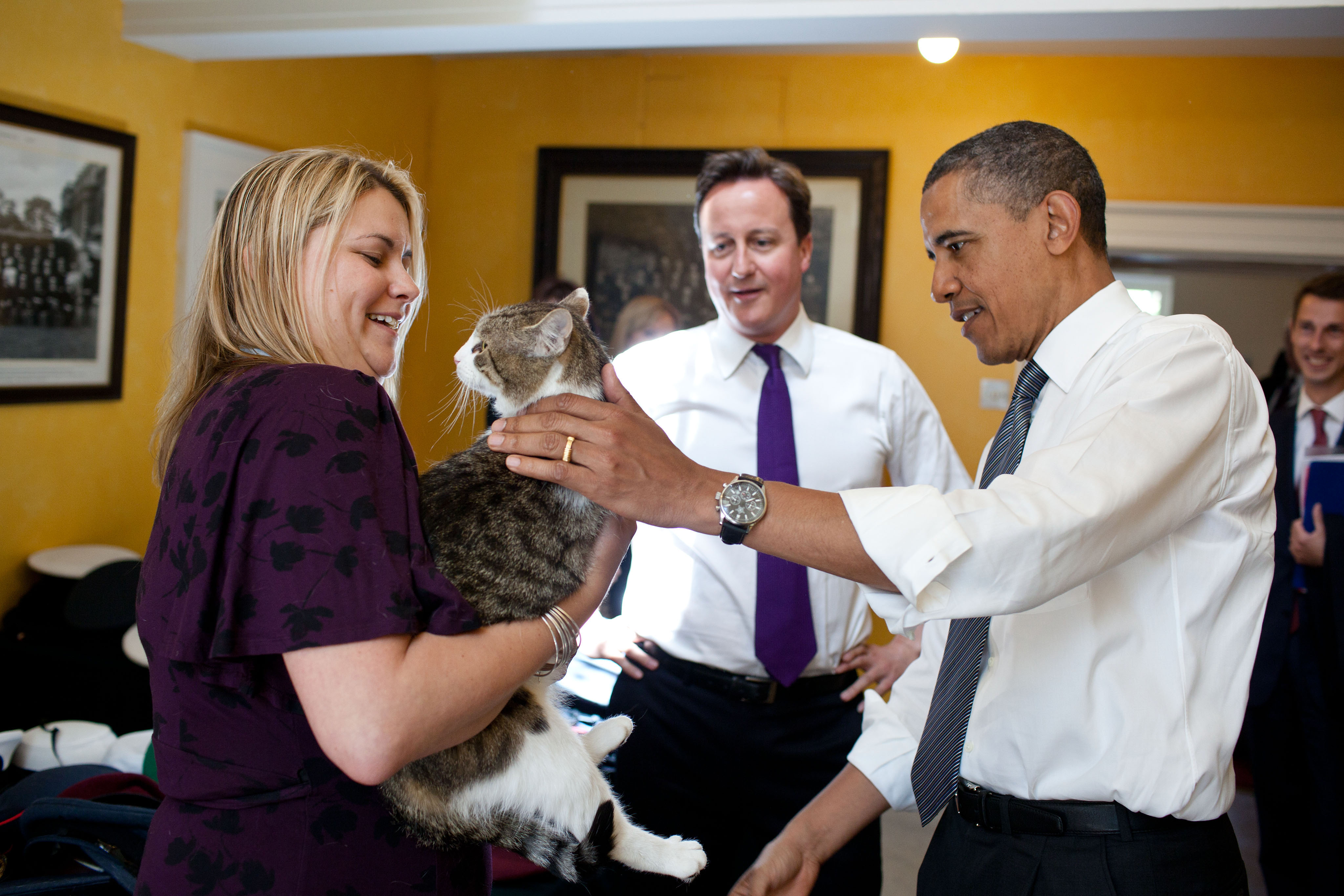
Larry in 2011 with Prime Minister David Cameron and U.S. President Barack Obama

Chief Mouser to the Cabinet Office (Note: Formerly Home Office cat.) is the title of the official resident cat at 10 Downing Street, the residence and office of the prime minister of the United Kingdom in London.

There has been a resident cat in the British government employed as a mouser and pet since the 16th century, although modern records date only to the 1920s. Despite other cats having served Downing Street, the first one to be given the official title of chief mouser by the British government was Larry in 2011. Other cats have been given this title affectionately, usually by the British press, and the cats are often portrayed in jest as being actual employees involved in the government's internal politics.

In 2004, a study found that voters' perceptions of the chief mouser were not completely above partisanship.

== History ==
There is evidence of a cat in residence in the English government dating back to the reign of Henry VIII, when Cardinal Thomas Wolsey placed his cat by his side while acting in his judicial capacity as Lord Chancellor. Official records, however, released into the public domain on 4 January 2005 as part of the Freedom of Information Act 2000 only date back to 3 June 1929, when A.E. Banham at the Treasury authorised the Office Keeper "to spend 1d (Note: 1 penny, equivalent to £0.23 in 2025) a day from petty cash towards the maintenance of an efficient cat". In April 1932, the allowance increased to 1s 6d (Note: 1 shilling and six pence, equivalent to £4.53 in 2025) (18 pence) per week (a little over 2.57 pence per day). By the 21st century, the mouser was costing £100 per annum. The cats do not necessarily belong to the prime minister in residence, and it is rare for the chief mouser's term of office to coincide with that of a prime minister. Before current Chief Mouser Larry, the cat with the longest known tenure at Downing Street was Peter III, who served for over 16 years under five different prime ministers: Clement Attlee, Winston Churchill, Anthony Eden, Harold Macmillan and Alec Douglas-Home.

The post has been held by Larry since 2011, the first to be given the title officially. The departure of the previous incumbent, Sybil, was in January 2009. Sybil, who began her tenure on 11 September 2007, was the first mouser for ten years following the retirement of her predecessor Humphrey in 1997. Sybil was owned by the then chancellor of the Exchequer, Alistair Darling, who lived in 10 Downing Street while the then prime minister, Gordon Brown, lived in the larger 11 Downing Street. On 27 July 2009 she died after a short illness; the chancellor's spokeswoman announced that Sybil had died at the Darlings' friend's home in London.

In January 2011, rats were seen in Downing Street, "scurrying across the steps of Number 10 Downing Street for the second time during a TV news report," according to ITN. There being no incumbent chief mouser at that time, the prime minister's spokesman said there were "no plans" for a cat to be brought in to tackle the problem; however, the following day, newspapers reported that the spokesman had said there was a "pro-cat faction" within Downing Street, leading to speculation that a replacement might indeed be brought in to deal with the problem. On 14 February 2011, it was reported that a cat called "Larry" had been brought in to address the problem. The London Evening Standard reported that the cat had been selected by David Cameron and his family, from those at Battersea Dogs & Cats Home.

Chief mousers in the past have overlapped, or been phased in, though the position can and has remained vacant for extended periods of time. Larry is the only chief mouser listed on the official website for Number 10.

== Partisanship study ==
In 2004 Robert Ford, a political scientist at the University of Manchester, reported on a YouGov survey on partisan reactions to the Downing Street cats. Participants in the survey were shown a picture of Humphrey, the chief mouser appointed by Margaret Thatcher, and told either that he was Thatcher's cat or that he was Tony Blair's cat. Affinity for the cat divided along partisan lines: Conservative voters liked the cat far more when they were told he was Thatcher's and Labour voters liked the cat far more when they were told he was Blair's. Ford concludes that partisanship shapes reactions to everything a politician does, however trivial, similar to the halo effect (and a reverse "forked tail effect") observed by psychologists.

== Timeline of chief mousers ==
Name	Began tenure	Ended tenure	Time in office	Prime Minister(s)	Refs
Rufus (popularly nicknamed "Treasury Bill")	1924		287 days	Ramsay MacDonald	
Rufus (popularly nicknamed "Treasury Bill")	1929	c. 1930	c. 1 year	Ramsay MacDonald	
Peter	1929	1946	c. 17 years	Ramsay MacDonald, Stanley Baldwin, Neville Chamberlain, Winston Churchill, Clement Attlee	
Bob (later nicknamed "Munich Mouser" by Churchill)	1937	1943	6 years 68 days	Neville Chamberlain, Winston Churchill	
Nelson	1940	c. 1944	c. 3 years 10 months	Winston Churchill	
Peter II	1946	1947	6 months	Clement Attlee	
Peter III	1947	1964	16 years 195 days	Clement Attlee, Winston Churchill, Anthony Eden, Harold Macmillan, Alec Douglas-Home	
Peta	1964	c. 1976	c. 12 years	Alec Douglas-Home, Harold Wilson, Edward Heath	
Wilberforce	1973	1987	c. 14 years	Edward Heath, Harold Wilson, Jim Callaghan, Margaret Thatcher	
Humphrey	1989	1997	c. 8 years	Margaret Thatcher, John Major, Tony Blair	
Sybil	2007	2008	c. 6 months	Gordon Brown	
Larry	2011	current	c. 15 years	David Cameron, Theresa May, Boris Johnson, Liz Truss, Rishi Sunak, Keir Starmer, Andy Burnham	
Freya	2012	2014	c. 2 years	David Cameron	

== See also ==
- Gladstone (cat), former chief mouser to HM Treasury
- Palmerston (cat), former chief mouser to the Foreign & Commonwealth Office
- Tibs the Great, the British Post Office's former "number one cat"

=== Lists ===
- Canadian Parliamentary Cats
- List of individual cats
- United States presidential pets
