= Larry (cat) =

Chief Mouser to the Cabinet Office since 2011

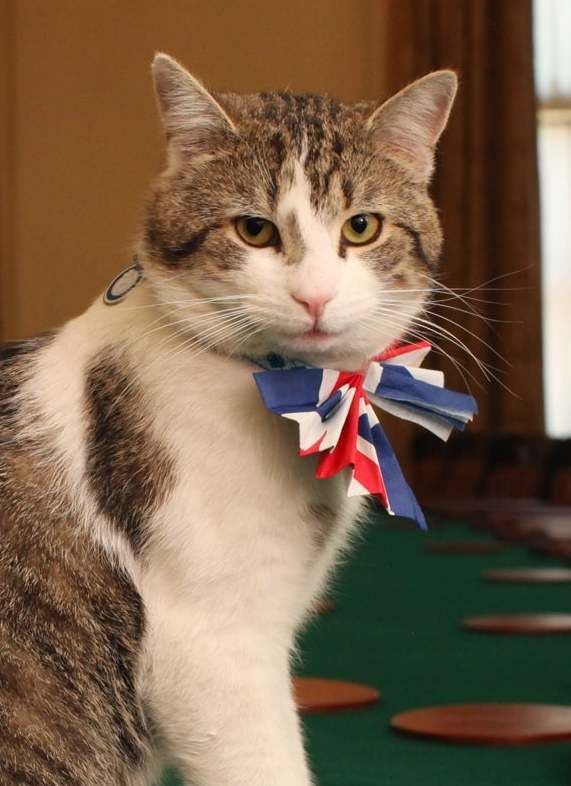
- Official portrait, 2016

Chief Mouser to the Cabinet Office
- Incumbent
- Assumed office 15 February 2011 Serving with Freya (2012–2014)
- Monarchs: Elizabeth II; Charles III
- Prime Minister: David Cameron; Theresa May; Boris Johnson; Liz Truss; Rishi Sunak; Keir Starmer; Andy Burnham
- Preceded by: Sybil

Personal details
- Born: c. January 2007 (age 19) London, England
- Occupation: Mouser
- Awards: Blue plaque at Battersea Dogs & Cats Home (2012)

Larry (born c. January 2007) is a domestic tabby cat that has served as Chief Mouser to the Cabinet Office at 10 Downing Street in the United Kingdom since 2011. He is cared for by Downing Street staff and is not the personal property of the prime minister. He has served during the tenures of seven prime ministers.

== Early life ==
Larry was born as a stray cat around January 2007 and later came into the possession of Battersea Dogs & Cats Home. In 2011 he was adopted by Downing Street staff, initially intended to be a pet for David Cameron's children. He was described by Downing Street sources as a "good ratter" and as having "a high chase-drive and hunting instinct". In 2012 the Battersea Home said Larry's publicity had resulted in a 15% increase in cat adoptions.

Soon after he was taken in at Downing Street, a story circulated in the press purporting that Larry was a lost cat and that the original owner had begun a campaign to retrieve him. It was later found to be a hoax, and that neither the owner nor the campaign existed.

== Career ==
Larry currently serves under Andy Burnham. Larry has outlasted six British prime ministers since he started in 2011: David Cameron, Theresa May, Boris Johnson, Liz Truss, Rishi Sunak and Keir Starmer.

The Downing Street website describes Larry's duties as "greeting guests to the house, inspecting security defences and testing antique furniture for napping quality". It says he is "contemplating a solution to the mouse occupancy of the house" and has told Downing Street that such a solution is still in the "tactical planning stage".

Unlike his predecessors since 1929, Larry's costs are funded voluntarily by members of staff, at no cost to His Majesty's Government. Fundraising events, organised to pay for his food, are believed to have included a quiz night held in the state rooms. Cameron explained during his final Prime Minister's Questions in 2016 that Larry "belongs to the house". According to The Daily Telegraph, Cameron considered Larry to be a civil servant.

=== Work as chief mouser ===
Within a month of his arrival at Downing Street, anonymous sources described Larry as having "a distinct lack of killer instinct." Later that year, it was revealed that Larry spent more time sleeping than hunting for mice, and shared the company of a female cat, Maisie. At one point in 2011, mice were so endemic in Downing Street that the Prime Minister, David Cameron, resorted to throwing a fork at one during a Cabinet dinner. His lack of killer instinct also earned him the nickname "Lazy Larry" by the tabloid press. He made his first known kill, a mouse, on 22 April 2011. On 28 August 2012 Larry made his first public killing, dropping his prey on the lawn in front of Number 10. In September 2012 Freya was also appointed the role of Chief Mouser to the Cabinet Office. In October 2013 Larry caught four mice in two weeks and one staff member rescued a mouse from his clutches.

In July 2015 George Osborne, the Chancellor of the Exchequer, and Matt Hancock, the Minister for the Cabinet Office, cornered a mouse in the Chancellor's office, trapping it in a brown paper sandwich bag. The press joked that Osborne might take over the position of Chief Mouser.

In July 2026, during Andy Burnham's first Cabinet meeting as prime minister, Larry was observed delivering a dead mouse in Downing Street.

In August 2026, after Burnham established Number 10 North, it was reported that a cardboard cutout of Larry had been installed.

=== Health ===
In September 2023 The Sun reported that Larry had been in ill health for some time and that Downing Street staff were preparing for his death. A statement from Downing Street denied this and described Larry as "happy and healthy".

In August 2024 it was reported that staff at Downing Street had begun preparing plans for how to announce Larry's death to the public. It was reported however that Larry was still healthy.

In August 2026, the website Politics UK, founded by a Reform UK councillor, reported that Larry had died. They later retracted the story, stating they had got it from "a reliable source that had been hacked".

In October 2026, Downing Street announced that Larry was recovering well from surgery to remove a cyst.

=== Public image ===
Ahead of the 2024 general election, an opinion poll from Ipsos showed that Larry had a higher favourability rating (44%) and net favourability rating (40%) than both Sunak (22% and –36%) and Starmer (34% and –7%).

== Relationships with politicians ==
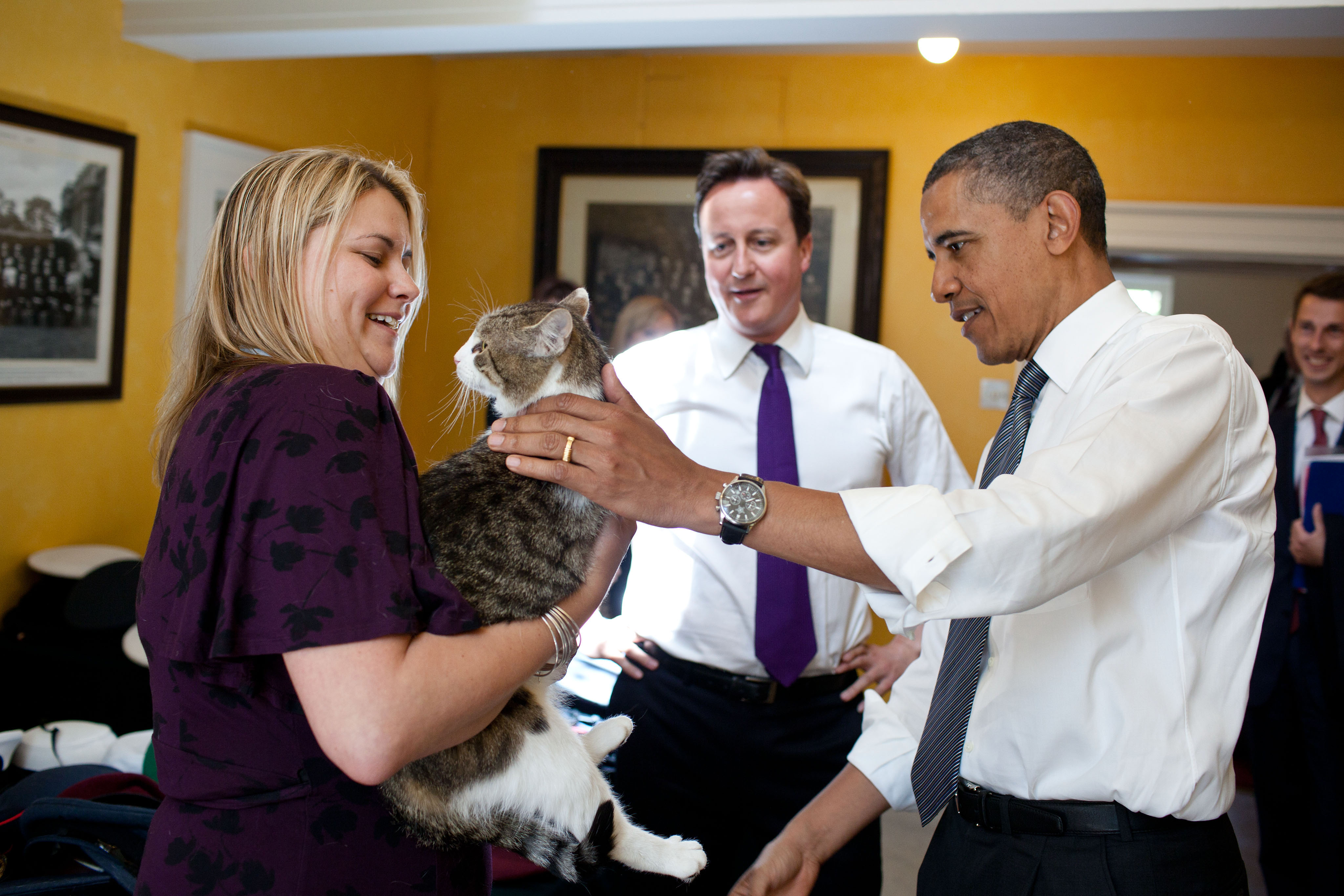
Larry with Prime Minister David Cameron and US President Barack Obama

David Cameron has said that Larry is a "bit nervous" around men, speculating that, as Larry was a rescue cat, this may be due to negative experiences in his past. Cameron mentioned that Barack Obama is an apparent exception to this fear; he said, "Funnily enough he liked Obama. Obama gave him a stroke and he was all right with Obama."

In September 2013 tensions were reportedly growing between Cameron and Larry. It was reported that Cameron objected to cat hair on his suit, and the smell of cat food had to be disguised by air freshener when Downing Street had visitors. The Camerons were said not to like Larry, amid suggestions that Larry was a public relations stunt. Cameron posted on Twitter that he and Larry got on "purr-fectly well". Nevertheless, the online gambling company Ladbrokes made Cameron the odds-on (1/2) favourite to leave Downing Street first, with Larry as the 6/4 outsider. The Daily Telegraph suggested that Cameron had never liked cats but that spin doctors believed Larry could improve his public image.

The former deputy prime minister Nick Clegg has described an internal Downing Street security door which requires microphone contact for access as being increasingly "not for security but to keep the cats out from one end of the building to another". When leaving office in 2016, Cameron spoke of his "sadness" that he could not take Larry with him. When Theresa May succeeded him in 2016, there were concerns that Larry was stressed and could be missing the Cameron family.

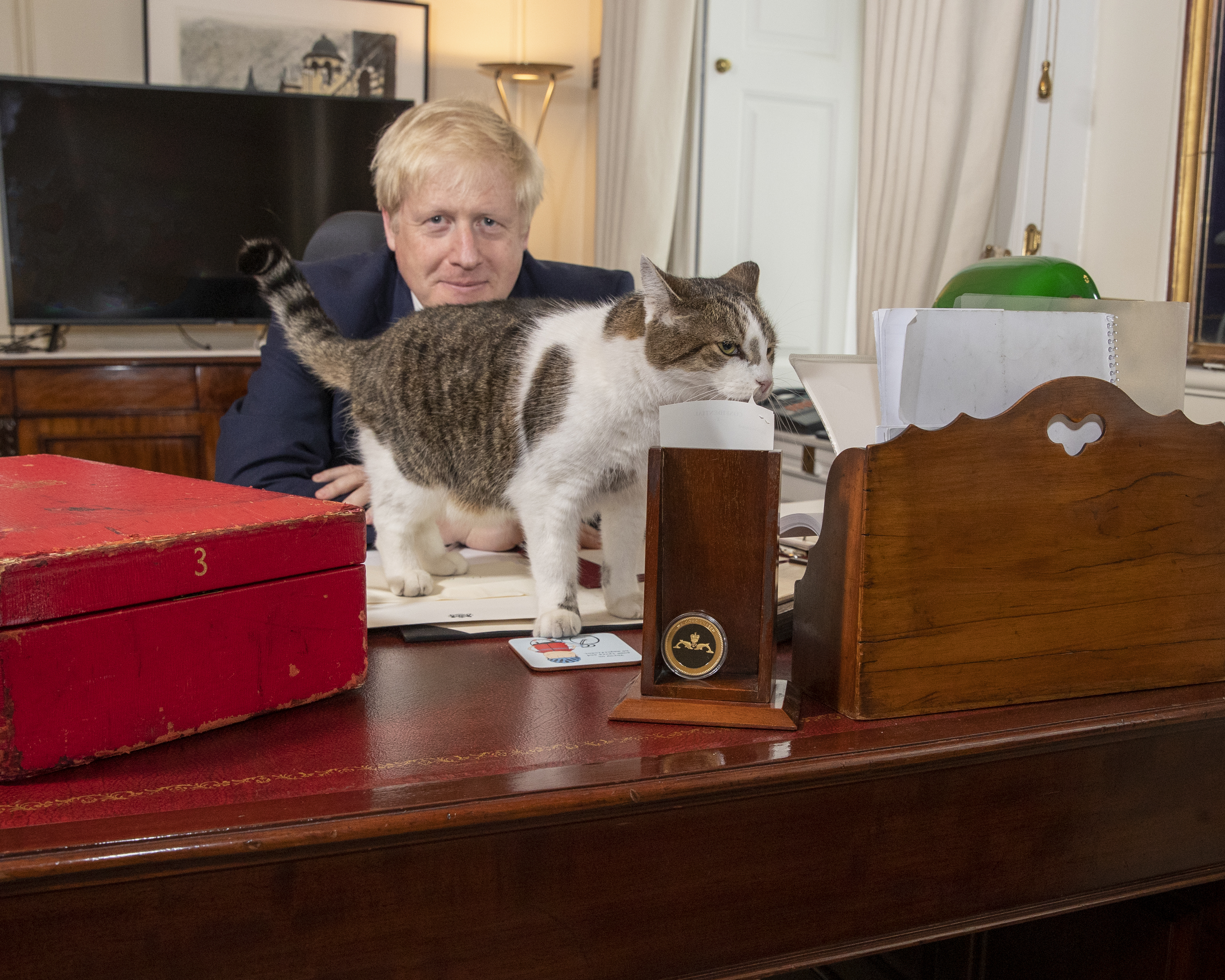
Larry with Boris Johnson in 2019

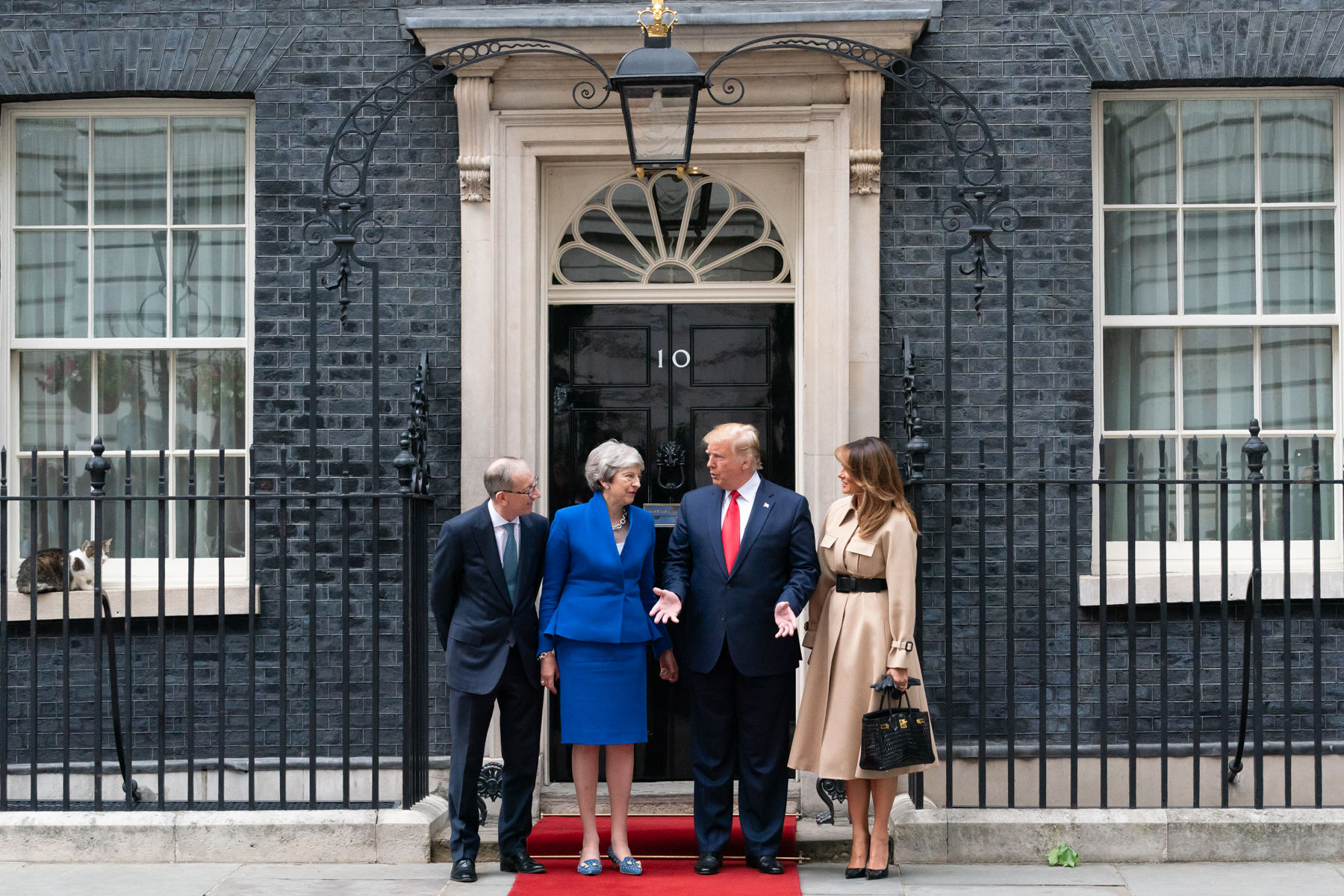
Larry (left) lies on the window of 10 Downing Street during a visit by US president Donald Trump

In August 2016 Alistair Graham, former chairman of the Committee on Standards in Public Life, responded to controversy over favouritism in Cameron's Dissolution Honours List by joking that he was "surprised Larry the cat didn't get one". In June 2019, in what was described in the press as a photobombing, Larry could be seen on the window ledge outside 10 Downing Street as Theresa May and her husband Philip May posed with US President Donald Trump and First Lady Melania Trump at the start of Trump's state visit to the UK; he later sheltered from the rain under Trump's presidential state car and was coaxed out only after some time.

Truss told the American journalist Jake Tapper in an interview in September 2022 that "he's doing a great job, although he does spend rather a lot of his time asleep."

When Sunak made his televised announcement in May 2024 of a general election, in the rain, Larry was also outside waiting for re-entry to Number 10.

He had a brief encounter with Ukrainian president Volodymyr Zelenskyy in October 2024 and met President of the European Commission Ursula von der Leyen in 2025. Larry also met Australian prime minister Anthony Albanese in September 2025. Larry met with NATO Secretary General Mark Rutte in June 2026.

== Relationships with other animals ==
In June 2012 Osborne was reunited with his long-lost cat Freya, who moved into 11 Downing Street. Freya and Larry were reported to have rapidly established cordial relations, although they had been seen fighting. Freya was reported to be the more dominant cat and more effective mouser, reportedly because her days as a stray had "hardened" her. In 2013 Osborne brought in a pet dog, Lola. Aides announced that Lola was "cat friendly". In November 2014 Freya left Downing Street, leaving Larry with the sole mousing responsibility.

In September 2019 a new dog, Dilyn, owned by Boris Johnson and Carrie Symonds, came to stay at Downing Street. Battersea Dogs & Cats Home offered to negotiate a deal with Larry. In December 2020 Larry stalked a pigeon outside Boris Johnson's official residence, and even managed to catch it. Despite the seemingly effective attack, the pigeon managed to fly off, apparently unharmed, after the brief scuffle. In October 2022 Larry chased away a fox from outside 10 Downing Street. It was reported that the fox was nearly twice his size. The incident was captured on CCTV.

In June 2021 Sunak, then the chancellor of the exchequer, adopted a fox red labrador puppy named Nova to live at 11 Downing Street. In September 2023 Akshata Murty, Sunak's wife, said that Larry and Nova had had "heated exchanges" in which Larry had come out on top.

During a personal interview on BBC Radio Derby in April 2024, the leader of the opposition, Starmer, mentioned that his family have a rescue moggie called Jojo. It was expected that like all prime ministerial families, Jojo would also reside at Number 10. The feline charity Cats Protection has offered advice to the Starmer family on making the relationship cordial between the two residents. On 2 September 2024 BBC Radio 5 Live's Matt Chorley said that he had been briefed that another cat, a Siberian kitten, had joined the Starmer household. Originally the children wanted a German Shepherd dog, but were persuaded to have another cat due to the difficulty with the inside front door of the Number 10 flat. Later that month, in an interview with Laura Kuenssberg, Starmer said that the kitten's name is Prince and is white with blue eyes.

=== Rivalry with Palmerston ===
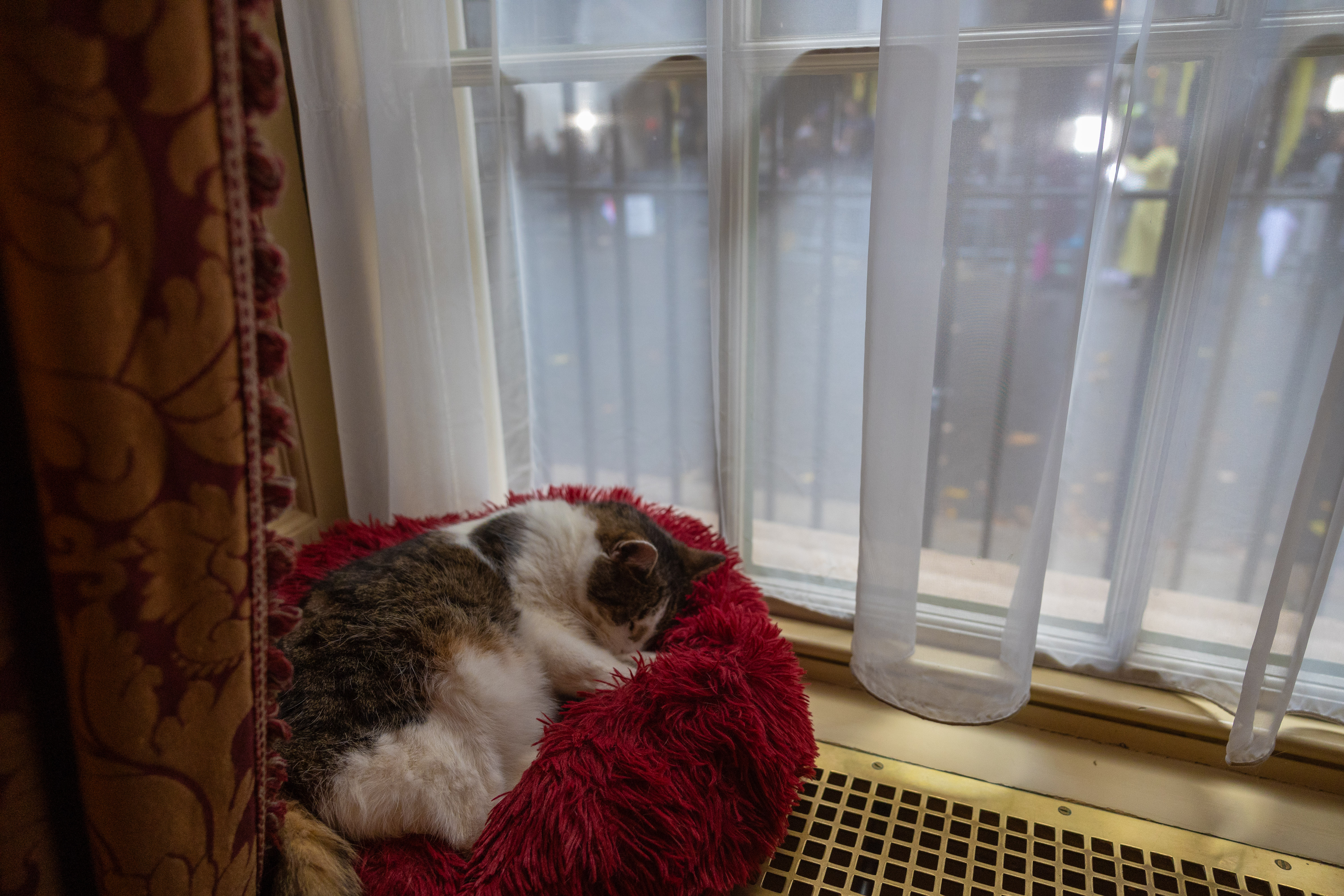
Larry sleeping in the window of 10 Downing Street

In April 2016 a new feline neighbour, Palmerston, moved into the Foreign Office. Although known to get along from time to time, the two cats fought on numerous occasions. The Leader of the House commented that he hoped that Palmerston and Larry would establish a modus vivendi. In July of that year Palmerston entered Number 10 and had to be removed by security staff. In September 2016 David Maclean, Baron Blencathra, submitted a question in the House of Lords asking why the government did not pay for Larry's veterinary bill for an injury picked up in a fight against Palmerston, and whether the government would refund civil servants who paid for Larry's care. Carlyn Chisholm, Baroness Chisholm of Owlpen, the government's spokesperson in the Lords, said: "The costs were met by staff through voluntary staff donations due to their affection for Larry."

On 1 August 2016, according to the political photographer Steve Beck, Larry had his "most brutal fight yet" with Palmerston on the steps of Number 10. During it Larry lost his collar, whilst Palmerston suffered from several deep scratches and a badly cut ear. When Palmerston "wrote" a letter announcing he was retiring and moving to the countryside on 7 August 2020, BBC News reported that Palmerston's "decidedly undiplomatic disputes [with Larry] are not thought to have hastened his departure".

== Awards and recognition ==
Larry was honoured with a blue plaque at Battersea Dogs and Cats Home in October 2012. The beetle species Caccothryptus larryi, first described in 2021, is named after him.

== In popular culture ==
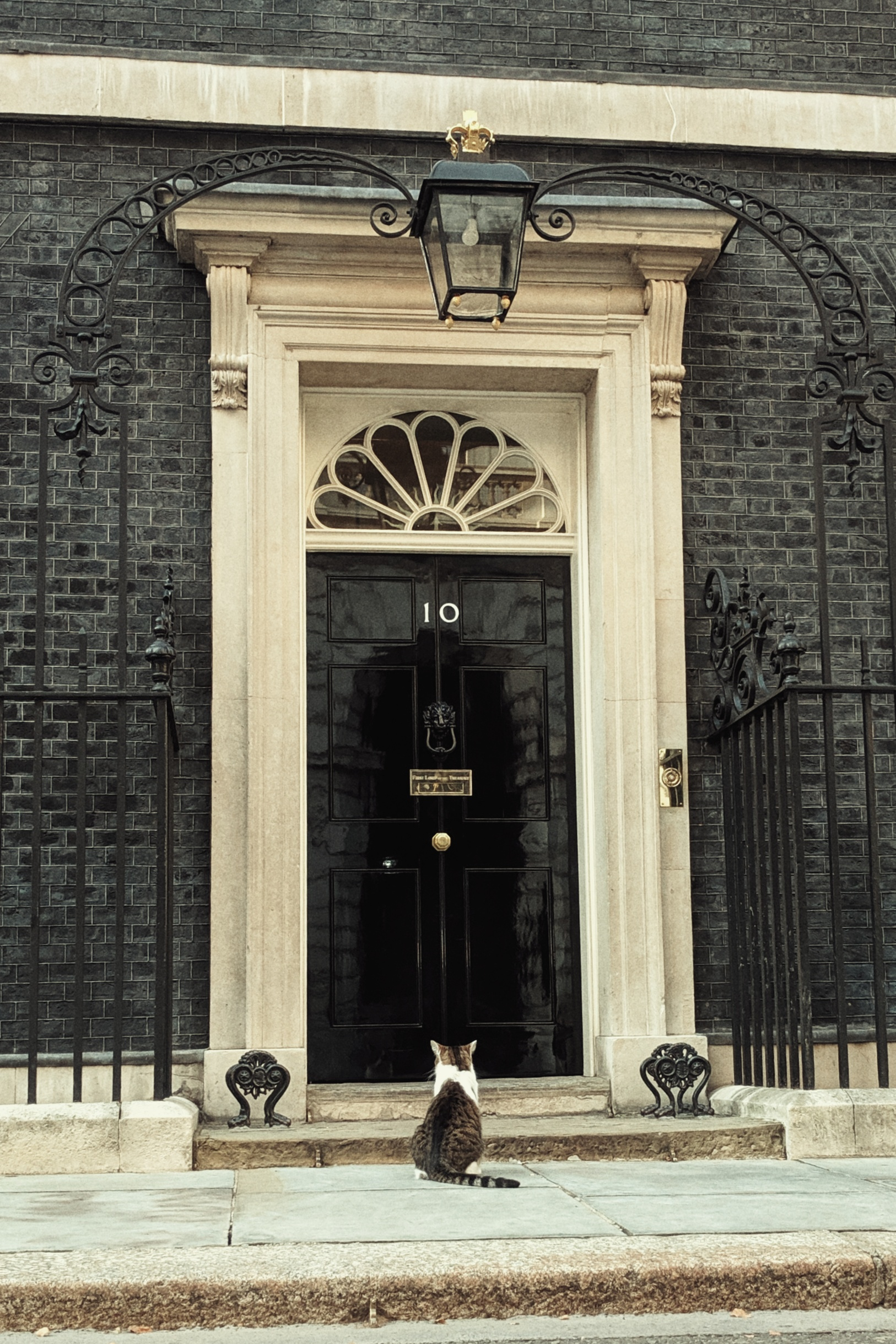
Larry at the door of 10 Downing Street, his official residence and workplace

A picture gallery to celebrate Larry's first two years in office was produced by The Daily Telegraph.

Larry's exploits and observations on life at Number 10 became the subject of a weekly cartoon in The Sunday Express, drawn by the cartoonist Ted Harrison.

In 2012 Larry was visible on the Google Street View of Number 10, sleeping next to the door.

A toy version of Larry is featured in the window of a mock version of 10 Downing Street, as reproduced in the lobby of the Londoner Macao in Macau, China.

Press photographers at 10 Downing Street who regularly take pictures of Larry have become popular on social media, and the photographer Justin Ng explained Larry's popularity through his "universal appeal" and described him as "media savvy."

Sky News included Larry in its virtual Downing Street representation as part of its coverage of the 2024 general election.

An unofficial parody Twitter account called @Number10Cat has become widely known for mocking and providing commentary on British and international political developments. The New York Times noted in 2022 that it "posts occasionally snarky observations about [the] rotating cast of prime ministers who occupy the house." In September 2024 The Times published a parody article attributed to Larry expressing his views about the new prime minister, Starmer, and his pets, and also highlighted several posts from the account over the years.

In July 2025, French president Emmanuel Macron, Starmer and Chancellor of the Exchequer Rachel Reeves joked about Larry and the Twitter account during Macron's state visit, with Reeves suggesting he was "the most popular person in Downing Street" and Starmer stating that he "has a very good social media profile" and telling Macron that "nobody knows" who writes the account's posts. Macron called a post by the account about the lending of the Bayeux Tapestry "wonderful" and also alluded to it during his press conference statement. The French news channel station BFM TV had also posted a feature about Larry on its social media accounts in connection with the visit.

A book about animals in politics by the journalist and former UK government adviser Peter Cardwell was inspired by his interactions with and social media posts about Larry.

== See also ==
- List of individual cats
