= Farm cat =

Type of domestic cat

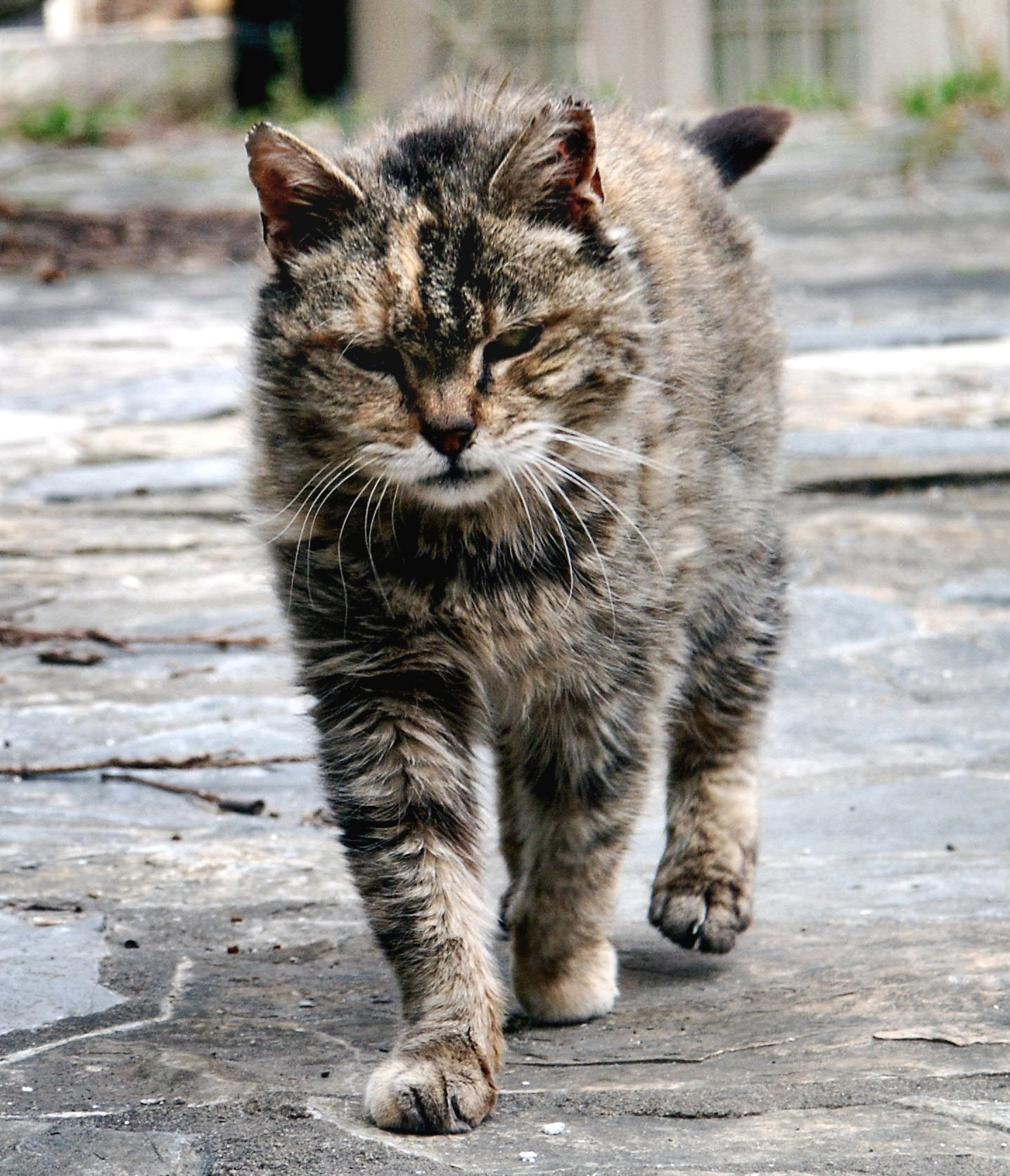
A feral farm cat, showing numerous healed injuries

The farm cat, also known as a barn cat, is a domestic cat, usually of mixed breed, that lives primarily outdoors, in a feral or semi-feral condition on agricultural properties, usually sheltering in outbuildings. They eat assorted vermin such as rodents and other small animals that live in or around outbuildings and farm fields.

The need for the working cat may have been the original reason cats were domesticated, to keep rodents from consuming or contaminating grain crops stored for later human consumption. They are still commonly kept for their effectiveness at controlling undesired vermin found on farms, ranches, greenhouses, and even drug farms, which would otherwise eat or contaminate crops, especially grain or feed stocks.

== History ==
Archeological evidence suggests that the earliest domestication of cats occurred about 7500 BC and was motivated by the human need to safeguard grain stores from rodents.

== Modern status ==
Farm cats live in a variety of conditions. Some are feral with minimal human contact and no veterinary care, deriving sustenance solely from their role in lowering the mouse and rat populations. Lack of a guaranteed food supply, internal parasites, and greater physical exertion tends to make these cats thinner than their house cat counterparts, with a shorter lifespan. Others are kept as free-ranging pets, given freedom to roam, yet allowed inside to eat supplemental cat food on a regular basis and given routine veterinary care.

Others live outdoors or in outbuildings full-time in semi-feral conditions, but are still tamed to be friendly toward humans and may be given basic veterinary care. All are subject to some risks inherent to outdoor life. Their prey may transmit parasites and disease, they may be injured by various means, and they can be struck by vehicles. Also, farm cats often die from poisoning by eating the corpses of poisoned rodents. Predation is also possible: cats are eaten by raccoons, owls, coyotes, and other animals that prey on creatures of their size.

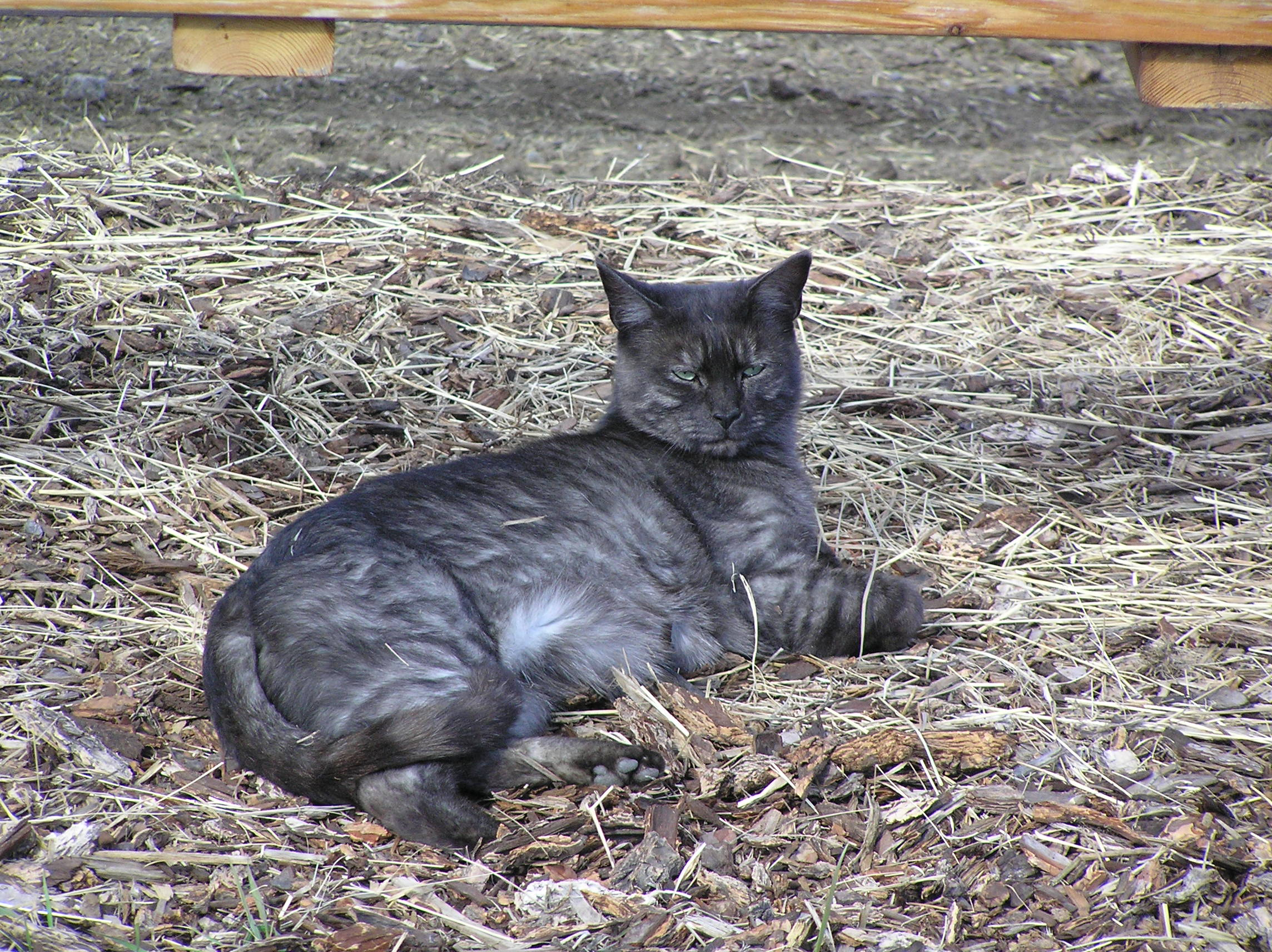
A tame barn cat, neutered, with access to supplemental cat food and regular veterinary care

Some full-time outdoor cats are given cat food by property owners, either to encourage them to stay or due to humane motivations of not wanting thin, hungry, or sick animals on the property. Other property owners deliberately do not feed outside farm cats, in the belief that they will not hunt rodents if they have supplemental food. Without supplementary food, cats will exterminate much of the local rodent population and move on, leaving only a temporary void. However, one concern with providing supplemental outdoor feed is that it can attract skunks, raccoons or other vermin.

Farm cats originate from a variety of sources. Sometimes, populations are spontaneously established when abandoned or stray cats, uninvited by humans, move into areas where prey is available, such as haystacks or farm outbuildings that contain stored crops or livestock fodder. In other cases, property owners obtain and release a few cats specifically for rodent control. Some animal shelters have Working Cat or "Barn Buddy" programs that re-home neutered feral and semi-feral cats at barns, warehouses, stores, and more. These programs have been growing in popularity in cities like Chicago, where rat problems are common.

If a population of feral adult female farm cats is high enough, a farm cat population can be self-sustaining. The females establish permanent homes in barns or other structures and raise repeated litters. Males may stay around if food is plentiful, though they tend to roam over a wider territory. Farm cat colonies can be subject to inbreeding, as a closed population may mate with one another's siblings, parents, or offspring. Spaying and neutering prevent unwanted litters, overpopulation, and inbreeding. In some cases, feral animals are trapped, spayed or neutered, then re-released to keep their territory claimed and to prevent new, fertile strays from taking up residence.

If given supplemental food or where rodents are plentiful, losses from predation or disease may be made up by new stray animals moving into the territory. If given no supplemental food, particularly in areas with many predators, farm cat populations may occasionally become extirpated if there are few nearby strays and a low breeding population. Predators, accidents, disease, parasites and hunger will all take a toll. More often, especially when supplemental food is provided, overpopulation is common, and losses then occur primarily due to disease or accidents, with predation playing a minor role—all insufficient to make a substantial dent in the population. Where numbers become an issue, some farm cat populations are controlled by shooting, poisoning, or trapping excess numbers.

== See also ==
- Ship's cat
- Bodega cat
- Library cat
