= Brewer High School (Fort Worth, Texas) =

Location
- 1025 W Loop 820 N Fort Worth, Texas 76108; United States; 32.779445°N 97.479072°W

Information
- School type: Public
- Motto: Think Big Bears Do!
- School district: White Settlement ISD
- Principal: Tommy Neal
- Teaching staff: 132.00 (FTE)
- Grades: 9-12
- Gender: Both male and female
- Enrollment: 2,172 (2023–2024)
- Student to teacher ratio: 16.45
- Campus size: 85 acres (340,000 m^{2})
- Colors: Royal blue and white
- Athletics: UIL 5A (since 2014)
- Mascot: Grizzly Bear

Brewer High School is a high school serving 2,162 students in grades 9-12 located in Fort Worth, Texas. It has a notable athletics program, as it has produced major league baseball players Aubrey Huff and Kelly Shoppach. The school mascot is the bear.

== History ==
The old high school was built in the 1950s and was later turned into a middle school in 2008.

== Campus ==
The school's campus on Cherry Lane in White Settlement, Texas was replaced with a new campus located near Loop 820 and Silver Creek Road in Fort Worth in 2007.

== Notable alumni ==
- Ron Clark, Former Major League Baseball player
- Gene Hatcher, Former boxer
- Skyler Howard, Japanese Football player
- Aubrey Huff, Former Major League Baseball player
- Vernon Johnson, NFL Free Agent
- Kelly Shoppach, Former Major League Baseball player
