= Vicki Myron =

American author and librarian

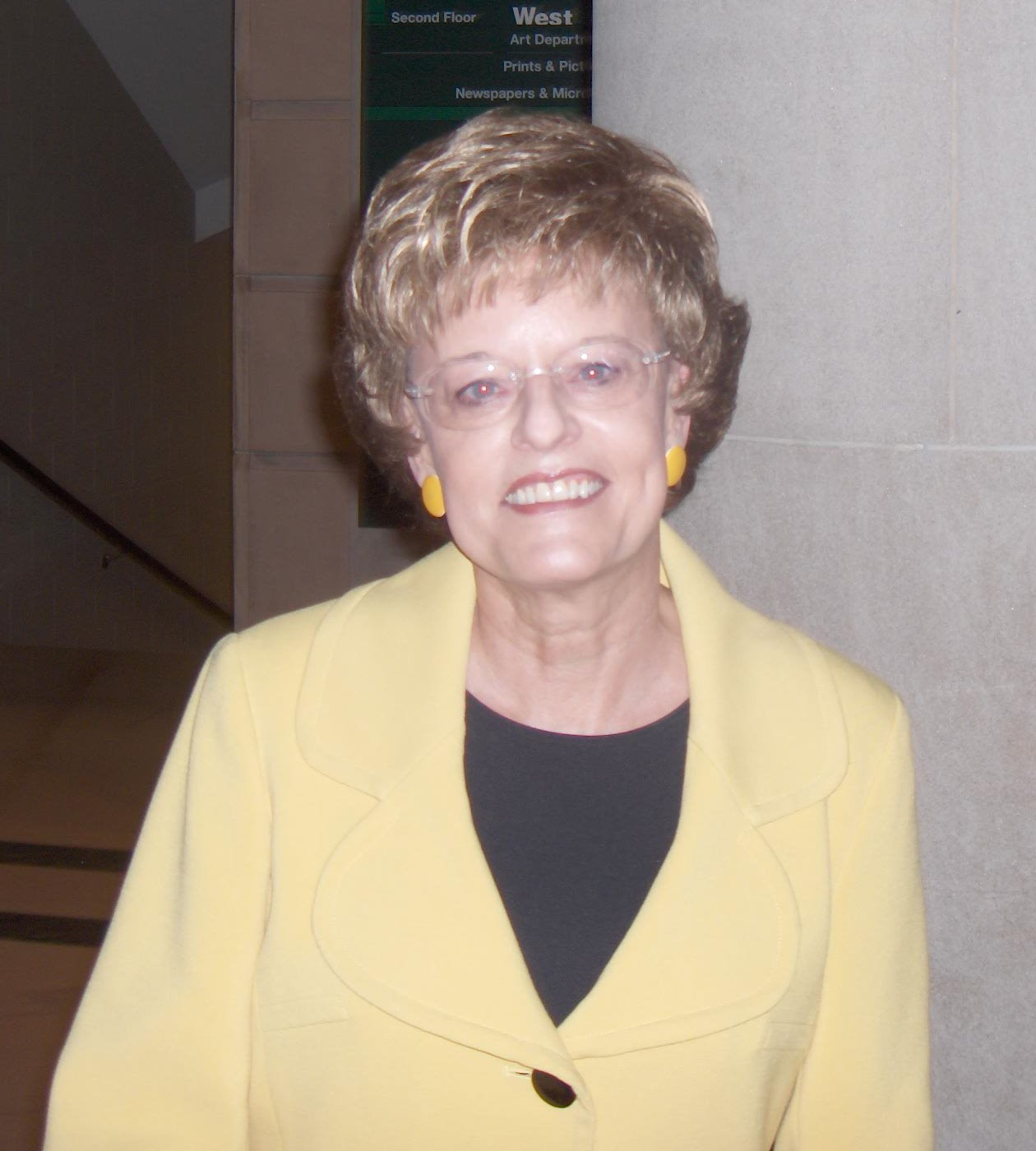
- Myron in 2009
- Born: 1947 (age 78–79); Spencer, Iowa, US
- Occupation: Author
- Children: Jodi Myron
- Writing career
- Genre: Biography
- Website: deweyreadmorebooks.com

Vicki Myron (born 1947) is an American author and librarian. Director of the Spencer Public Library for more than 20 years, she is best known for her book Dewey: The Small-Town Library Cat Who Touched the World, co-written with Bret Witter. It sold more than one million copies internationally and was on bestseller lists for more than six months. The book is about a cat she found and cared for at the library, and his engaging effects on the townspeople. The library cat's story became internationally known during his life.

The book's great success led to a publishing phenomenon, with Myron and Witter also writing two related children's books, and with publication of audio books. Their sequel, Dewey's Nine Lives, was published in 2010, as was a second children's picture book about the cat. A proposed film adaptation had not been completed; as of May 2012 the script had not been approved and the first option was due to expire in June 2012.

== Early life ==
Vicki Myron was born in Spencer, Iowa and grew up on a farm near Moneta, fifteen miles from the town of Spencer. She attended local schools and graduated from high school in Hartley. She moved to Mankato, Minnesota, married, and had a daughter. She later divorced and earned a bachelor's degree at Minnesota State University, Mankato, then called Mankato State University.

== Career ==
Myron returned to Spencer and started working as assistant director at its public library in 1982. She became the director in 1987 and completed a master's degree through Emporia State University's distance-learning program. She served as director for 25 years. She retired in 2007 and lives in Spencer, as of December 2008, with her cat Page, given to her by a friend who found the cat on a snow-covered road.

In 1988, Myron found an eight-week-old kitten left in the library drop box on a bitterly cold night. She took care of him, naming him Dewey (full name Dewey Readmore Books). The staff made him the library cat. He lived until 2006, making friends with many library patrons and becoming internationally famous after his story was reported in various outlets. He was so popular that he was featured on postcards for sale by Friends of the Library, and raised funds of some US$4,000 by May 2005. His obituary was carried by 250 newspapers, including the New York Times.

Myron retired from the library the next year, and began work on a book about Dewey, with co-author Bret Witter. They received $1.2 million from Grand Central Publishing for the rights to Dewey's life story. The pair also wrote Dewey: The Small-Town Library Cat Who Touched the World, which was published in 2008. The book recounted the story of the cat, which had reached an international audience, and reflected on her own and the town's challenges during this period. It became a great success. It sold more than a million copies internationally, was translated into numerous languages, and was on bestseller lists for six months.

In November 2008, Myron learned that a film company was interested in an adaptation, with Meryl Streep proposed to play her. The first option was due to expire in June 2012; as of May a final script had not been approved. In 2012, Myron said that she had been unhappy with the script and was not sorry that that version would not be filmed.

Myron and Witter published a children's picture book, Dewey: The Library Cat, in 2009, and also a book adaptation for middle-grade readers later that year.

In 2010, Myron and Witter published a sequel, Dewey's Nine Lives, recounting additional stories about Dewey. In addition, she discussed material from letters she received about people and their cats. That same year, she and Witter published a children's picture book, the second about the cat, called Dewey's Christmas at the Library, intended for 3–6-year olds.

== Selected works ==
Year	Title
2008	Dewey: The Small-Town Library Cat Who Touched the World
2009	Dewey: The Library Cat (illustrated)
2009	Dewey: There's a Cat in the Library!
2010	Dewey's Christmas at the Library (illustrated)
2010	Dewey's Nine Lives: The Legacy of the Small-Town Library Cat Who Inspired Millions

== Honors ==
In 2012 Myron won the Iowa Association of School Librarians' Goldfinch Award for Dewey: There's a Cat in the Library. This book was ranked first by Florida's children in 2011, and it was "in the running for a similar award in Nebraska." It is one of two picture books devoted to the cat.

== See also ==
- Dewey Readmore Books
