= Lyle S. Shelmidine =

American historian

Lyle Stanton Shelmidine (June 16, 1906 – May 6, 1966) was an American Professor of History and a Naval Intelligence Officer during World War II.

Born in Spencer, Iowa, Shelmidine was one of nine children. Shelmidine was a professor and the Chairman of the Department of History at the College of Puget Sound (now the University of Puget Sound).He received his Bachelor of Arts from Grinnell College, and his MA and PHD at the University of Iowa. Shelmidine was also a member of the American Historical Association.

== Teaching career ==
Shelmidine began his teaching career at a boys' school, the Tarsus American College, in Tarsus, Turkey; he taught there for four years, beginning in September 1930. He first joined the College of Puget Sound faculty in 1936, where he attained full professorship in 1946. Shelmidine also served as a visiting professor at the University of Montana and the University of Puerto Rico. Shelmidine specialized in Islamic studies and the Far East, and maintained acquaintances in Turkey over the years, including Kemal Atatürk and other Turkish officials.

== Naval career ==
Shelmidine joined the United States Navy during World War II, eventually attaining the title of Lieutenant Commander as an Executive Officer on the Island of Midway. He was first stationed in Turkey and other Balkan countries, where he worked with naval intelligence, though little is known about his work during that period. Shelmidine was then stationed at Midway Island as the Executive Officer of the naval air station for 13 months toward the end of the war. He left the post in October, 1945 for a new position with the department of naval history in Washington, D.C. before returning to Tacoma in 1946. He died at Puget Sound in 1966.
