= Working cat =

Domestic cat kept primarily for pest control rather than companionship

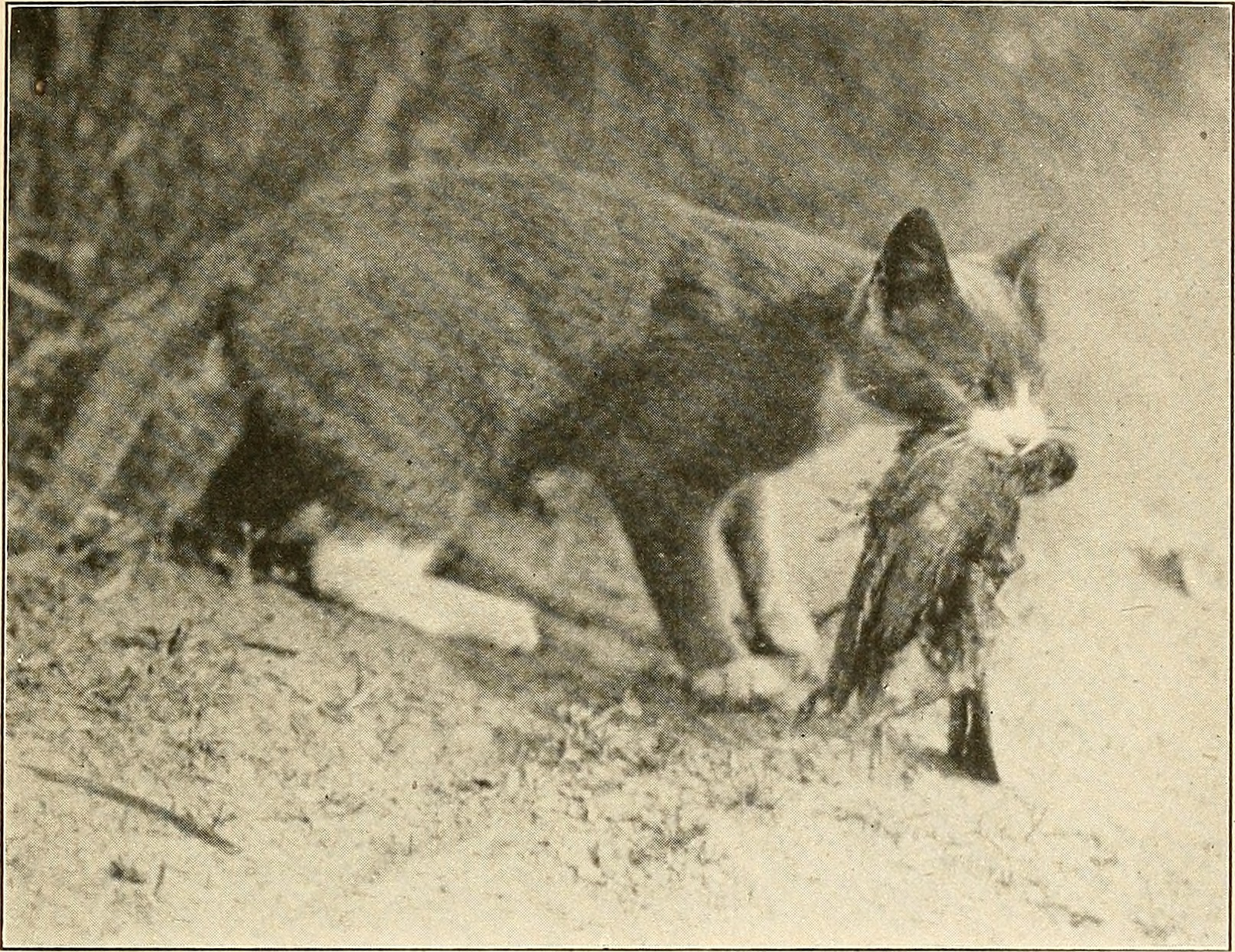
A farm cat with its prey in 1916

A working cat, also known as a mouser, is a type of domestic cat that "works" for its keep by hunting vermin, such as rodents. They are commonly employed where pest control is needed, such as farms, factories, warehouses, stores, restaurants, harbors, houses of prayer, and private property. A benefit of using a working cat is that they alleviate the need for harmful pesticides. Working cats are often placed in their environment as a part of a working cats program.

== Working cats programs ==
A working cats program is designed to place cats in safe environments where they are valued for their hunting skills as working cats. These programs are typically offered by animal shelters who will use otherwise unadoptable cats in the program as an alternative to euthanasia. The cats may not be suitable for adoption because they are feral cats or did not acclimate to living in close quarters with humans. Working cats programs usually provide cats that are spayed or neutered and fully vaccinated, and any adoption fee is often waived. In exchange for their services, the cats are to receive a place to live, food, water, and vet care.

== Type of working cats ==
Types of working cats include:

- Bodega cat, inhabits a convenience store ('bodega')
- Farm cat
- Library cat
- Ship's cat

=== Examples ===
Working cats kept to deter mice in public buildings include:

- The resident cat at the British PM's official residence at 10 Downing Street, an old building susceptible to frequent rodent infestations, has been given the title Chief Mouser to the Cabinet Office. (United Kingdom)
- Tibs the Great kept by the Royal Mail (UK)
- Canadian Parliamentary Cats (Canada)
- Hermitage cats at the Hermitage Museum (Russia)
