= Grand County Public Library =

Library in Moab, Utah

Coordinates: 38.57360°N 109.54559°W

Grand Country Public Library
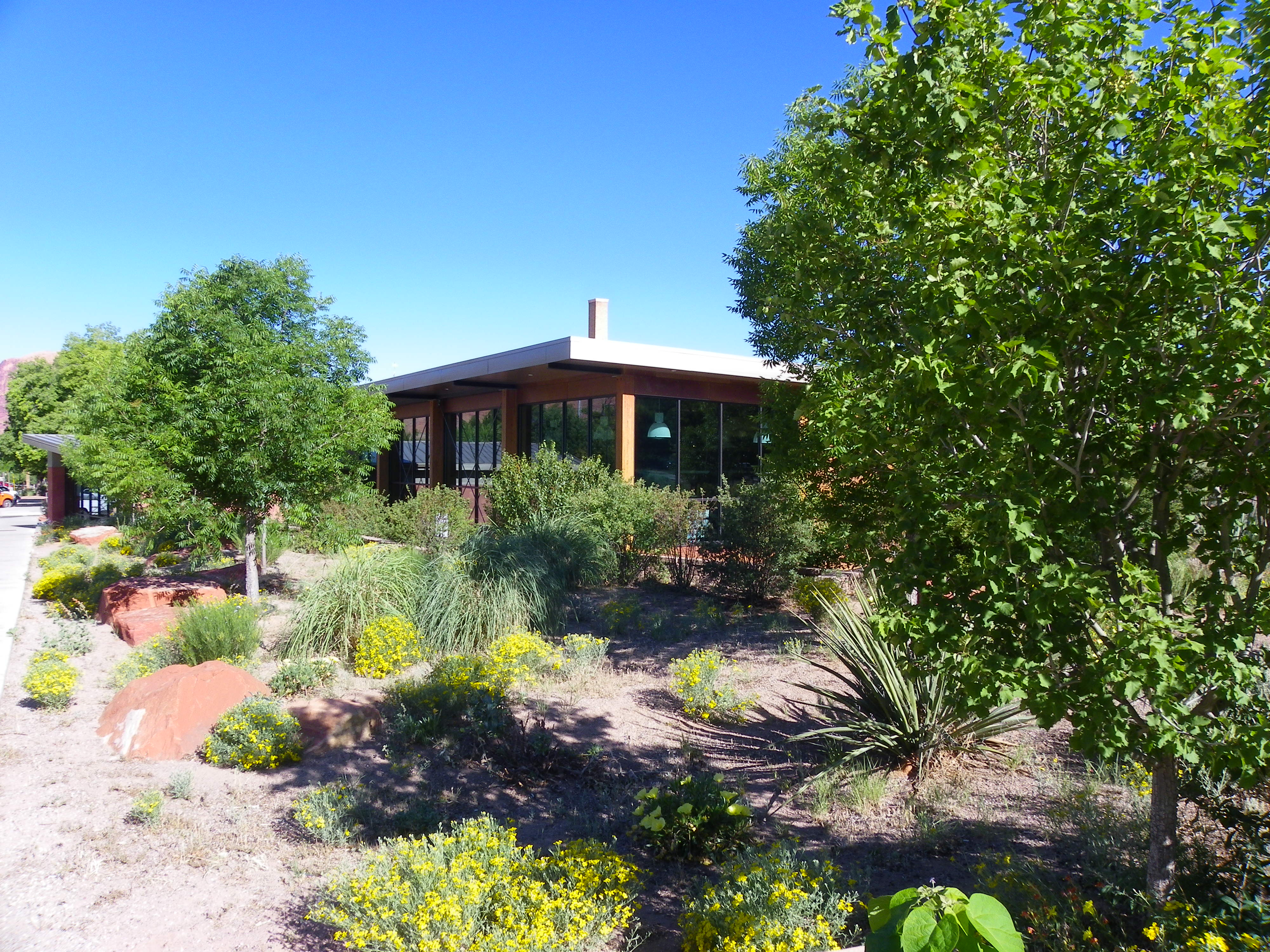
- Location: Moab, Utah, U.S.
- Established: 1915
- Branches: 2

Other information
- Director: Carrie Valdes
- Website: www.moablibrary.org

Grand County Public Library is a public library that serves the community in Grand County, Utah. The library's main branch is in Moab, Utah and a second branch is located in Castle Valley, Utah.

The library's mission is to serve as a freely accessible resource that connects people, information, and ideas to inspire, empower, and enrich all members of the community.

== History ==
The issue of building a library was brought up in a 1911 Citizens' mass convention. The county decided to build one.

The library was completed in 1915. Then, in 1935, it moved again, to the high school. In 1967, the library burned down. The townsfolk helped rescue hundreds of books. After the fire, the library moved yet again.

The library was named the best small library in the USA of 2007 in Library Journal.

The library has had a library cat called Cosmo since 2018, who features on library publications and even has a feature Cosmo's Corner in the Moab Sun News where the library features new services.

== Collections ==
The library houses books, DVDs, eBooks, audiobooks, puzzles, newspapers and magazines. The library service has used the Koha ILS since 2012.

In particular staff have noted that audiobooks are particularly popular with their community as local people tend to drive long distances across the remote areas.
