= Clay County Fair =

Annual event in Spencer, Iowa

Coordinates: 43.15286°N 95.15440°W

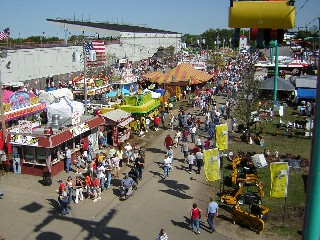
Behind the Grand Stands.

The Clay County Fair is held every September in Spencer, Iowa, United States. It is the largest county fair in the state of Iowa. It has the largest agricultural exposition in North America. Bringing in over 310,000 visitors a year, Clay County Fair is one of the largest county fairs in the United States. 2011 set an attendance record of 328,000. Beginning in 1918, the fair has grown considerably over the past century.

In its first year, Clay County Fair drew 30,000 guests. In 1936, the fair completed construction of its second grandstand, able to seat more than 7,500. It remains in use today. During the 1930s, the fair continued construction of agricultural buildings for livestock. Clay County Fair has firmly planted itself as the largest Midwest county fair.

The fair also hosts a carnival of at least 80 rides and attractions. There also are numerous businesses that have booths throughout the fairgrounds. It consists of more than 35 square city blocks of space, and continues to fill up the space tighter and tighter every year.

Some familiar people/groups who have visited or performed at Clay County Fair are: Former President George W. Bush, Sen. John Kerry, former Vice President Al Gore, Bob Hope, Lynyrd Skynyrd, Johnny Cash, Tim McGraw, John Michael Montgomery, Kenny Rogers, Lee Ann Womack, Martina McBride, REO Speedwagon, The Righteous Brothers, Plus One, Clay Aiken, ZZ Top, LeAnn Rimes, Brad Paisley, Toby Keith, Chris LeDoux, Styx, Vanilla Ice, Jeff Foxworthy, Bryan White, Lee Greenwood, Bill Cosby, Red Skelton, Jim Nabors, Lonestar, Grand Funk Railroad, Garth Brooks, Survivor, Trisha Yearwood, Bill Engvall, Heart and Foreigner.

With completion of the Clay County Regional Events Center inside the fairground walls, new opportunities have opened. Some of these are indoor concerts. With seating up to 3,400 people, the events center has hosted The Barnum and Bailey Circus, and the Lipizzan Stallions. It also has a large ballroom/dining room capable of seating up to 400 people, just creating even more opportunities to flourish and grow.

The fair completed another project in 2007. The Race Track was modified into a 3/8 track. The previous track was a large, flat, half-mile oval that was generally used for horse racing. In order to host high-quality auto racing events, the fair deemed it necessary to construct a completely new racetrack. It was converted to a 3/8 mile clay track, with increased corner banking to adjust for the higher speeds of auto racing. Additionally, a state-of-the-art lighting system was installed to make the races more visible for both drivers and fans.

In 2008, the racing schedule featured the International Motor Contest Association (IMCA) hosting two classes of racing; Modifieds and Stock Cars. Those races also included Hobby Stocks and 360 Modifieds. July 4, the WorldDirt Racing League (WDRL) also hosted a Late Model Series and 360 Sprints on the track. The season rounded out with an appearance by the World of Outlaws during the 2008 Clay County Fair and another race with IMCA Modifieds and Stock Cars, with Hobby Stocks and 360 Modifieds.

In 2013 the Clay County Fair Association partnered with Iowa Lakes Community College to break the Guinness World Record for Largest Science Experiment. To achieve the record, Iowa Lakes Community College and the Clay County Fair had to get at least 750 people in the Grandstand and participating in a half-hour science lesson and experiment. The previous record was set in Oslo, Norway with 749 students in a junior high in November 2012. As part of the experiment, those in attendance participated in two experiments.

The first experiment, according to Mark Zabawa, associate professor of chemistry and biology at ILCC's Emmetsburg campus, included mixing potassium iodide and hydrogen peroxide with detergent to create a foam resembling "elephant toothpaste." The second included using leaf blowers to demonstrate kinetic energy.

Due to the coronavirus pandemic, it was announced on Thursday, July 2, 2020, that the Clay County Fair was canceled for the 2020 season. The decision was announced following a vote by the Fair Executive Committee. After weeks of exploring various options, it became clear that it was simply impossible to maintain social distancing and protect the health and safety of fairgoers, staff, volunteers, 4-H/FFA youth, exhibitors, vendors, sponsors and entertainers during the nine-day event. Despite the cancelation, 4H and FFA livestock competitions were still held in the fall. The fair reopened for the 2021 season. This is only the fifth time the fair has been canceled in its history, and the first time the fair has been canceled since World War 2 (1942 through 1945).
