= Alice Cook Fuller =

American writer

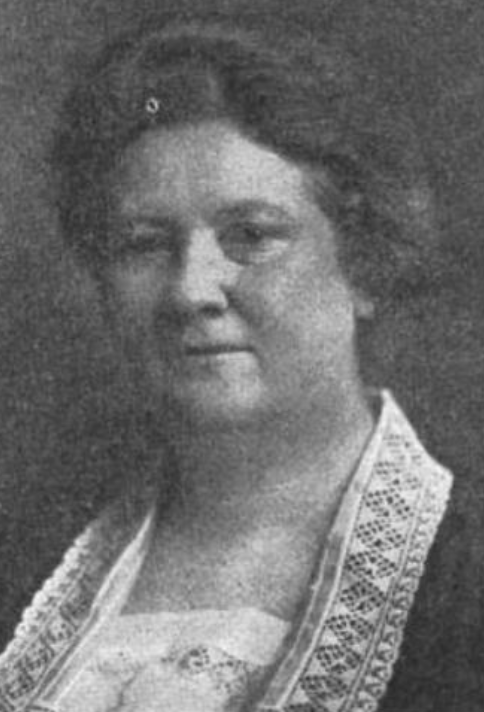
- Alice Cook Fuller, from a 1924 publication
- Born: Alice Emma Cook; October 30, 1873; Spencer, Iowa
- Died: September 30, 1956 (age 82); Berkeley, California
- Occupations: Writer, educator, school superintendent

Alice Emma Cook Fuller (October 30, 1873 – September 30, 1956) was an American writer and educator.

== Early life ==
Alice Emma Cook was born in Spencer, Iowa and raised in Deadwood, South Dakota, the daughter of Thomas G. Cook and Sarah J. Love Cook.

== Career ==
Fuller was an educator and writer based in Colorado. She began teaching when she was a teenager, taught again in midlife, and was the elected superintendent of schools in Larimer County from 1923 to 1931. She was president of the Fort Collins Writers Club. Later in her career, she moved to Berkeley, California, and wrote a novel for children, Gold for the Grahams (1946), based on her own childhood in South Dakota.

== Publications ==
In addition to her novel, Fuller wrote short stories, lesson ideas, and scripts for school and community group theatrical use, including adaptations of Dickens' A Christmas Carol, Coppee's Little Jean's Christmas, and Edward Everett Hale's The Man Without a Country. Her works were published in professional and general interest journals including Philippine Education, Journal of Education, Primary Education, Primary Plans, Canadian Teacher, Table Talk, Woman's Home Companion, and Pearson's.

- "Flag Drill" (1898)
- "Hoop Drill" (1902)
- "Busy Work for First Grade Pupils" (1903)
- "A Journalist, Pro Tem" (1909, short story)
- "A Christmas Star Party" (1909)
- "Patriotic Drill" (1910)
- "Sunflower March for Sixteen Boys" (1910)
- "A Menagerie Party for Boys" (1912)
- "A Magazine Party" (1912)
- "A Colonial Tea Party" (1912)
- "Spring Blossoms" (1913)
- "Coral" (1914)
- Joy of the L V (1914)
- Dramatized Stories, Myths, and Legends (1914, 1940)
- "The Christmas Program" (1931)
- Gold for the Grahams (1946, novel for young readers)
- "But First I've Got to Do This" (1947, short story for young readers)

== Personal life ==
Alice Cook married George Senter Fuller. He was a rancher and sheriff, and he rode with other cowboys in Theodore Roosevelt's inaugural parade in Washington, D.C. The Fullers had two daughters, Marion and Katheryn, and two sons, Norman and Theodore (who died young). Her husband died in 1924, and she died at a hospital in Berkeley in 1956, aged 82.
