= Dewey Readmore Books =

Resident cat at the Spencer Public Library in Spencer, Iowa, US

- Dewey Readmore Books in 2002
- Species: Cat
- Sex: Male
- Born: November 18, 1987 (Note: Although Dewey's exact date of birth is unknown, he was approximately two months old on his discovery and the library celebrated his birthday on November 18.); Spencer, Iowa, US
- Died: November 29, 2006 (aged 19); Spencer, Iowa, US
- Occupation: Library cat
- Employer: Spencer Public Library
- Title: Staff Supervisor
- Term: 1988–2006
- Owner: Vicki Myron
- Named after: Melvil Dewey
- www.spencerlibrary.com/p/dewey-library-cat.html

Dewey Readmore Books (November 18, 1987 – November 29, 2006) was the library cat of the Spencer, Iowa, Public Library. Having been abandoned in the library's drop box in January 1988, he was adopted by the library and gained local attention for his story shortly thereafter.

His fame soon grew nationally, then internationally, and he was featured in a variety of mediums, including Paul Harvey's radio program The Rest of the Story and a Japanese documentary about cats. His story became so well known that, after his death in November 2006, his obituary was featured in more than 270 newspapers worldwide. Dewey's caretaker, head librarian Vicki Myron, published a book on Dewey's life in 2008, entitled Dewey: The Small-Town Library Cat Who Touched the World, which became a New York Times number-one nonfiction bestseller which was translated into numerous languages. Myron adapted it for two children's versions, wrote the sequel Dewey's Nine Lives (2010), and published a third children's book, Dewey's Christmas at the Library.

== Early life ==
On January 18, 1988, Vicki Myron, a librarian at the Spencer Public Library, discovered an eight-week-old male kitten that had been left in the library's drop box the previous night. Myron nursed the cat, which was suffering from frostbite, back to health and named him Dewey, after Melvil Dewey, inventor of the Dewey Decimal library classification system. The library decided to keep him as a library cat and his story first received publicity in the Spencer Daily Reporter a week after his discovery.

A contest to name the cat received nearly 400 entries, the majority of which supported retaining the name "Dewey". The librarians added "Readmore Books" to his full name, inspired partially by the cartoon library cat Cap'n O. G. Readmore, although he was usually referred to as just "Dewey". Aside from a brief episode in August 1989, when he escaped and went missing for almost a week after a janitor left a side door open at night, Dewey spent the remainder of his life in the library. He was given the title of staff supervisor and his birthday was celebrated on November 18.

== Worldwide fame ==
In 1990, Myron entered Dewey into a charity pet photograph contest at Spencer's Shopko as a way to promote the library; Dewey won the contest by a landslide, after receiving more than 80% of the votes. Dewey's win was covered in The Des Moines Register, which led to increased local and state publicity in print and on television, and the library never again made an effort to increase Dewey's publicity outside of the local area. An appearance in the June/July 1990 issue of Country magazine took Dewey's story national, after which eleven people claimed to have been the person who left Dewey in the book drop as a way to protect him from the cold.

He gained further recognition when he was featured in Gary Roma's late 1990s documentary Puss in Books, and his fame spread internationally. He appeared in calendars and was discussed on an episode of Paul Harvey's The Rest of the Story in June 1999. In 2004, he made an appearance in a Japanese documentary and gained a cult following in that country. Featured on postcards sold by the Friends of Spencer Public Library, Dewey had helped raise $4000 for the institution by 2005.

== Later years and legacy ==
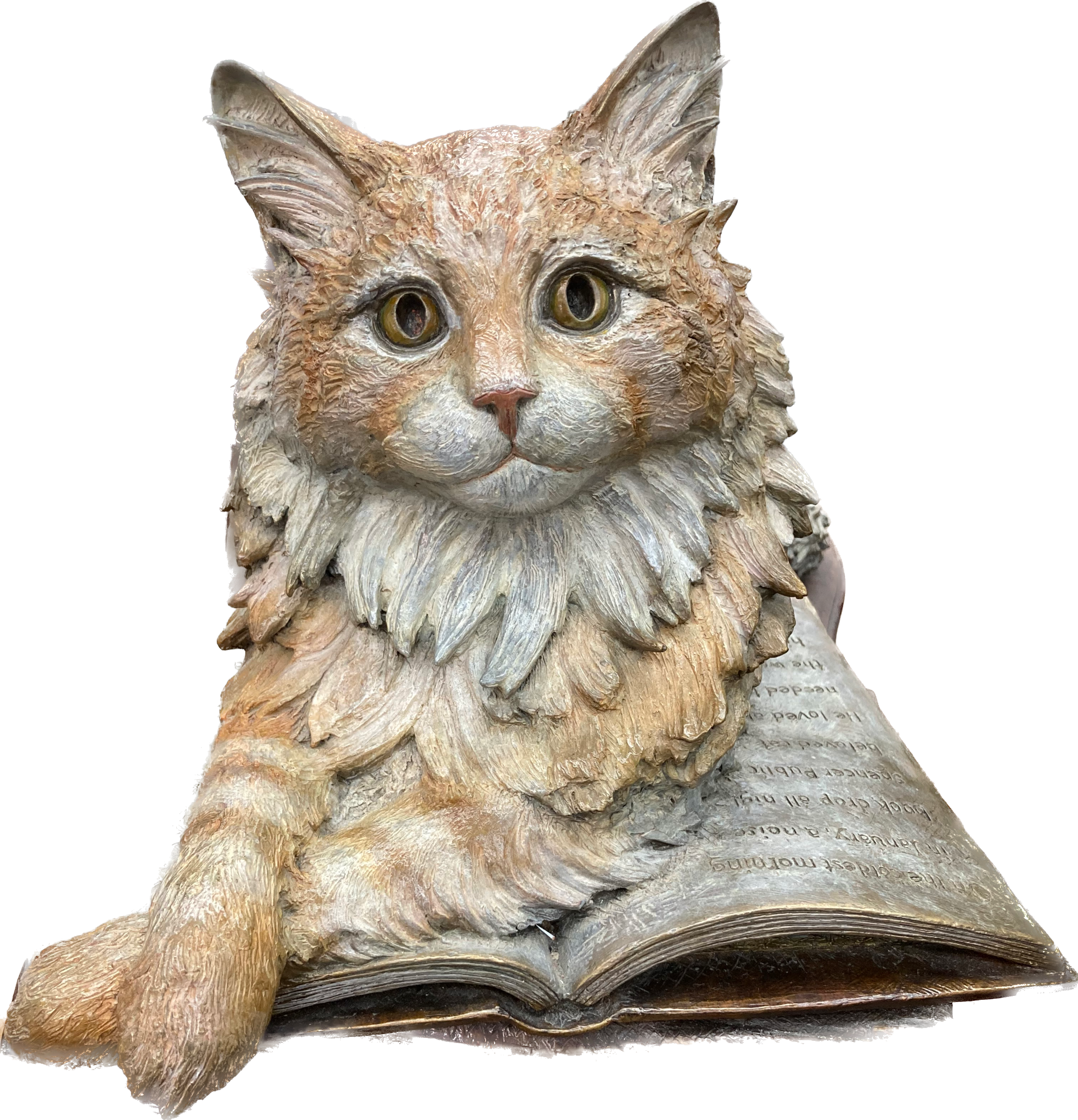
Statue of Dewey in the Spencer library

Early in life, Dewey was diagnosed with megacolon, which was expected to shorten his lifespan. The condition was aggravated by his refusal to eat foods that would ease his condition, as he was a notoriously finicky eater. In later years he was also afflicted with arthritis. In October 2006, he was discovered to be suffering from hyperthyroidism. Shortly before November 18, he was diagnosed with a painful stomach tumor. Myron had Dewey euthanized on November 29. He had achieved an age equivalent to a human in his nineties.

Dewey's obituary ran in over 270 national and international newspapers and his death was announced on Japanese television. A public memorial service was held in December 2006 and his cremated remains were buried outside of the library. Despite numerous offers, the library leaders placed a two-year moratorium on getting a new cat. In January 2009, the library board voted to have a permanent prohibition against any other cats or pets at the library, to avoid problems for patrons with allergies.

In 2008, Myron published Dewey: The Small-Town Library Cat Who Touched the World, written with the help of Bret Witter, which reached number one on The New York Times Best Seller list of nonfiction books. The book told the story of Dewey's life at the library, interspersed with the difficulties faced by the town and Myron in her personal life, and how Dewey helped ease those burdens. Based on their first book, Myron and Witter published two children's books: Dewey: There's a Cat in the Library!, a picture book for young children; and Dewey: The Library Cat, a book for middle-grade readers. Later in 2008, Meryl Streep was cast to star in a film based on the book. By May 2012, a final script had not been approved, and the film option was due to expire in June 2012. Myron and Witter published a sequel, Dewey's Nine Lives, in 2010, detailing previously unreleased stories about Dewey, as well as tales Myron heard about other cats after Dewey's death. That same year, Myron and Witter published a children's book, Dewey's Christmas at the Library, intended for 3–6 year-olds.

== See also ==
- List of individual cats
