= Vernon Johnson (American football) =

American football player (born 1992)

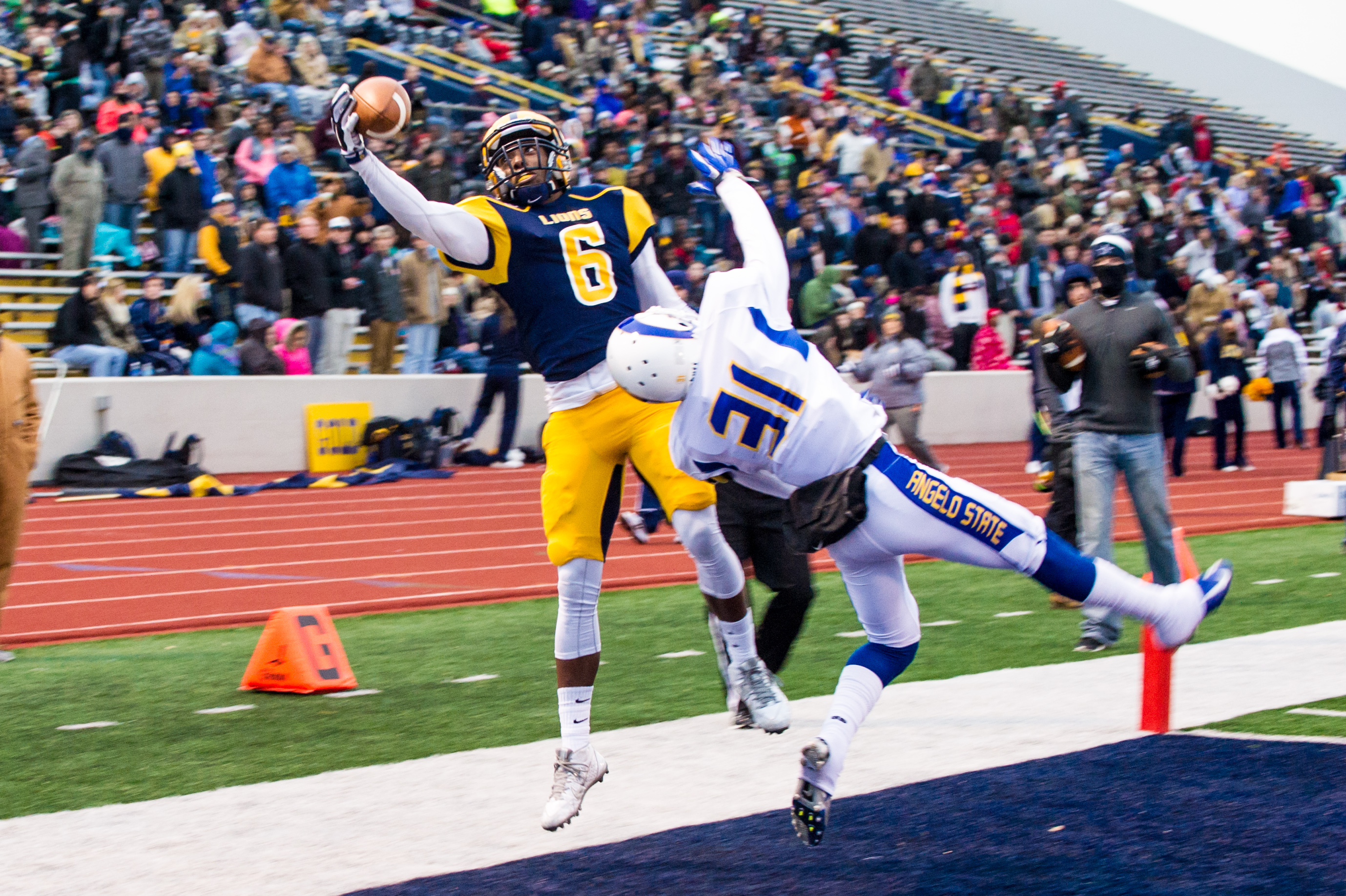
- Johnson (6) playing for A&M–Commerce in 2014

No. 89
- Position: Wide receiver

Personal information
- Born: April 17, 1992 (age 34); San Diego, California, U.S.
- Listed height: 6 ft 0 in (1.83 m)
- Listed weight: 196 lb (89 kg)

Career information
- High school: Brewer (Fort Worth, Texas)
- College: Midwestern State; Southwestern College; Texas A&M–Commerce
- NFL draft: 2015: undrafted

Career history
- Detroit Lions (2015)*; Wiesbaden Phantoms (2016); Ottawa RedBlacks (2017)*; BC Lions (2018)
- * Offseason or practice squad member only

Awards and highlights
- NCAA Division II All–American (2014); LSC Wide Receiver of the Year (2013, 2014)
- Stats at CFL.ca

Vernon Johnson (born April 17, 1992) is an American former football wide receiver. He played college football at Midwestern State University, Southwestern College, and Texas A&M University–Commerce.

== Early life ==
Johnson attended Brewer High School in Fort Worth. During his senior season in 2009, he had 76 receptions for 1,006 yards and 11 touchdowns. He also lettered in basketball as well as track & field.

== College career ==
Johnson began his college career at Midwestern State University; he redshirted in 2010 and caught 6 passes for 146 yards and a touchdown as a reserve receiver in 2011.

In 2012, he transferred to Southwestern College, where he caught 49 passes for 1,082 yards and 15 touchdowns.

During his first season at Texas A&M University–Commerce in 2013, he set school records in receptions (70), receiving yards (1,350), and receiving touchdowns (13), although his touchdown reception record was broken by his teammate Ricky Collins during the next season. He also added 496 kick return yards and led the conference in all purpose yards per game with an average of 183.8. In addition, he won the Lone Star Conference (LSC) wide receiver of the year award.

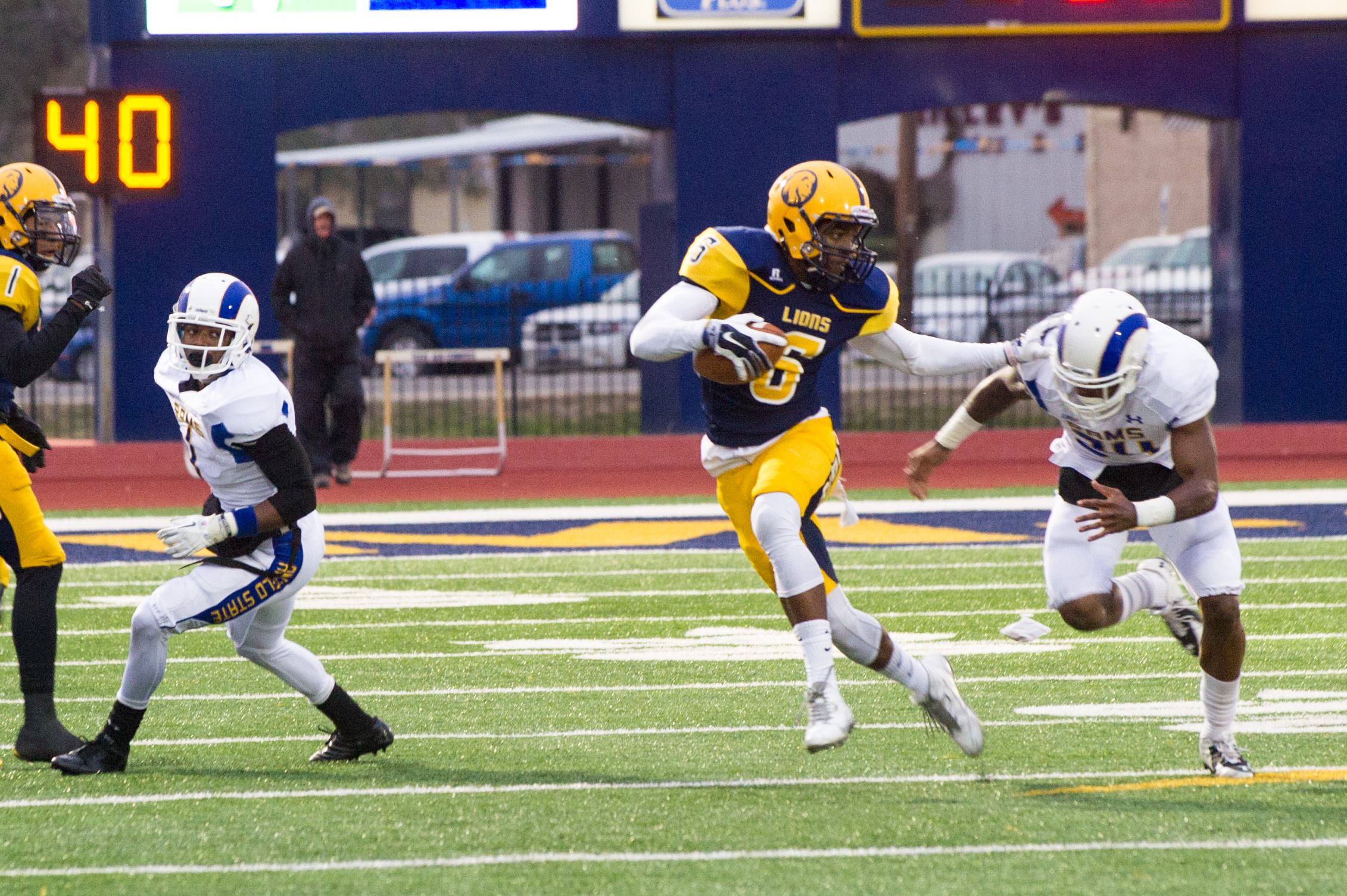
Johnson (6) in action against Angelo State in 2014

In 2014, Johnson totaled 77 receptions for 1,258 yards and 12 touchdowns, thus breaking his reception record from the previous season; he also tallied 304 kick return yards. He helped lead a conference championship-winning A&M–Commerce team that led the nation in both average points per game (54.1) and average yards per game (535.4). The team also opened the season with a record-breaking performance against East Texas Baptist in which it scored 98 points, amassing 986 total yards of offense and 13 touchdowns. This performance helped Johnson earn his second LSC wide receiver of the year honor, while also being named an AFCA first team All-American.

After his college career Johnson was selected to compete in the NFLPA Collegiate Bowl. Draft analysts projected him to be drafted in the 5th or 6th round of the NFL Draft, and he drew comparisons to Bruce Ellington. NFL draft analyst Lance Zierlein described Johnson as a "creative, instinctive receiver who has the feet and hips to make defenders miss and the acceleration to hit the big play either after the catch or down the field."

=== NCAA stats ===
			Receiving					Kick returns				
Year	Team	G	Rec	Yds	Avg	Lng	TD	Ret	Yds	Avg	Lng	TD
2010	Midwestern State	Redshirt										
2011	Midwestern State	8	6	146	24.3	99	1	0	0	0	0	0
2012	Southwestern College	Played at Junior College										
2013	Texas A&M–Commerce	11	70	1350	19.3	88	13	15	496	33.1	81	0
2014	Texas A&M–Commerce	12	77	1258	16.3	71	12	14	304	21.7	64	0
Totals:		31	153	2754	18.0	99	26	29	800	27.6	81	0

== Professional career ==
=== Detroit Lions ===
After going undrafted in the 2015 NFL draft, Johnson signed with the Detroit Lions as a free agent. He was cut from the team on August 31, 2015.

=== Wiesbaden Phantoms ===
Johnson played with the Wiesbaden Phantoms of the German Football League during 2016 season.

=== Ottawa Redblacks ===
Johnson signed with the Ottawa Redblacks on June 7, 2017. He was cut from the team on June 18, 2017.

=== BC Lions ===
Johnson signed with the BC Lions on May 9, 2018.
