= Spencer, Iowa =

Spencer
- City
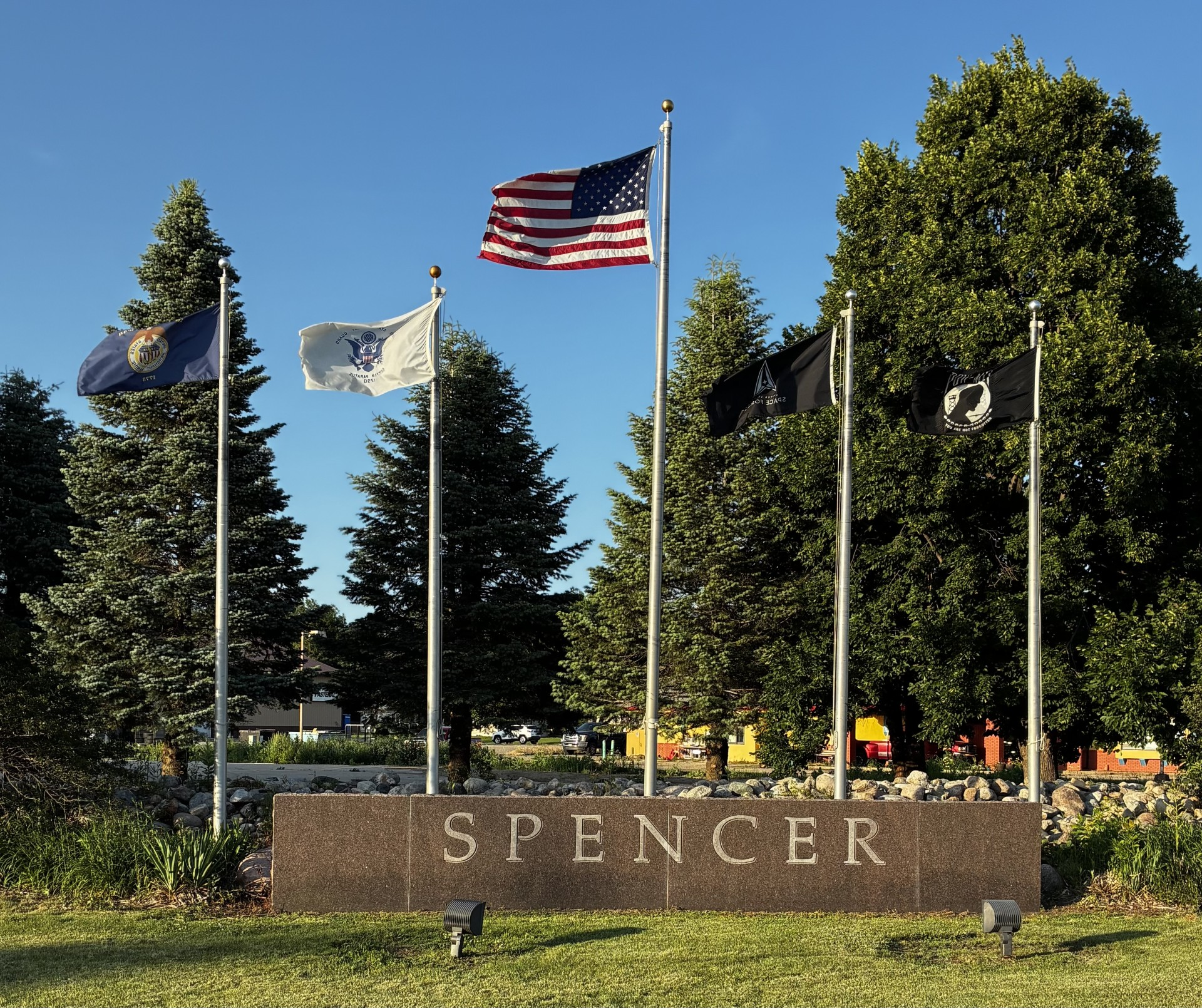

- Location of Spencer, Iowa
- Coordinates: 43°07′50″N 95°08′15″W
- Country: United States
- State: Iowa
- County: Clay

Government
  - Type: Mayor-council

Area
  - Total: 11.11 sq mi (28.77 km^{2})
  - Land: 10.95 sq mi (28.35 km^{2})
  - Water: 0.16 sq mi (0.42 km^{2})
- Elevation: 1,319 ft (402 m)

Population (2020)
  - Total: 11,325
  - Density: 1,034.5/sq mi (399.43/km^{2})
- Time zone: UTC-6 (Central (CST))
  - Summer (DST): UTC-5 (CDT)
- ZIP codes: 51301, 51343
- Area code: 712
- FIPS code: 19-74280
- GNIS feature ID: 468732
- Website: www.spenceriowacity.com

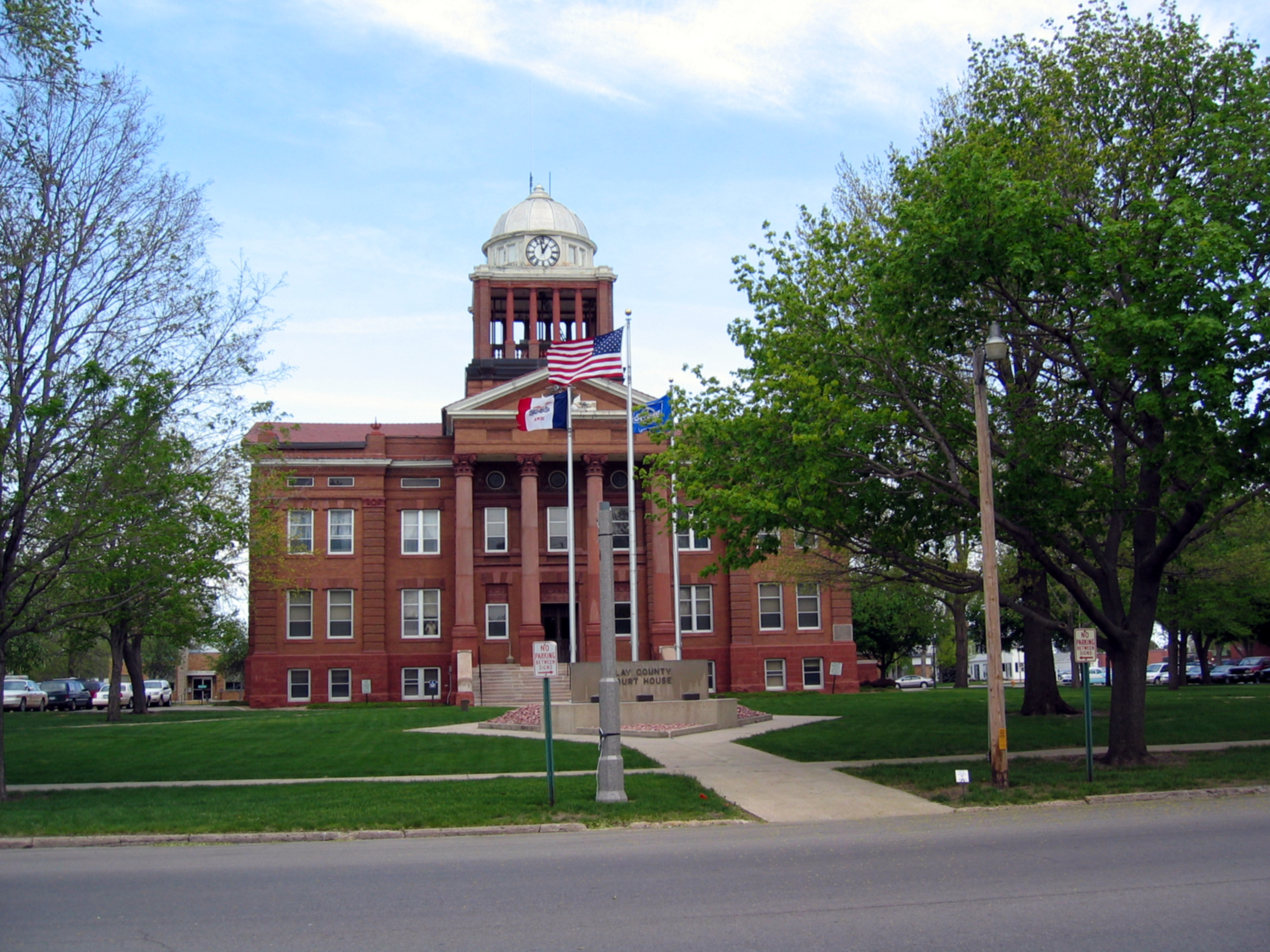
Clay County Courthouse in Spencer

Spencer is a city in the state of Iowa, United States, and the county seat of Clay County. It is located at the confluence of the Little Sioux and Ocheyedan rivers. The population was 11,325 in the 2020 census, an increase from 11,317 in 2000. Spencer hosts the Clay County Fair, held annually in September and averaging more than 300,000 visitors.

The town's late library cat, Dewey Readmore Books, became known throughout the world before his death in 2006. He was immortalized in the book Dewey: The Small-Town Library Cat Who Touched the World by Vicki Myron, director of the library, and Bret Witter.

== History ==
When Clay County was established in 1851, it had no local government and official business was done out of Sergeant's Bluff, nearly 100 miles away on the Missouri River. In 1859, Judge Hubbard of Iowa's 4th Judicial District authorized a committee to find a site for the county seat. This committee selected "Section 20 of Spencer Township", located roughly in the center of the county near the confluence of "Sioux River and Ocheydan Creek", as the site for the "seat of justice". County Judge Charles Smeltzer approved their plan and began signing documents with the location "Spencer, Clay County, Iowa", even though he was not physically there. A small group of land speculators had cleared the area and laid out a town plan, but there were no people living in that area at the time. Most of Clay County's residents were living in Peterson Township, in the far southeastern corner of the county. Put to a vote, Peterson was chosen as the County Seat and a courthouse erected there. The site of the proposed town languished, uninhabited, for many years, the area coming to be called "Spencer Grove".

The first settlers in what is now Spencer arrived in Emmetsburg in the Winter of 1865. Most of the men were Union veterans of the Civil War from Wisconsin and were claiming land under the Homestead Act of 1862. While in Emmetsburg, they were told of Spencer Grove and decided it would make a nice place to establish their homesteads. The town site was platted by John Franklin Calkins. He and his family and some other families arrived in Spencer Grove in May 1866 and were joined by another wave of settlers later that summer. On September 20, 1866, Spencer Grove Township was formally organized; one of the benefits was the residents being able to vote locally rather than traveling twenty miles to Peterson, the County Seat and only incorporated town in Clay County. In October 1866, Spencer Grove resident Romanzo Coates was elected as Superintendent of Clay County Common Schools; he established the first schoolhouse on the upper level of his cabin and appointed his wife as the first schoolteacher.

In 1868, the US Postal Service authorized a post office to be established at Spencer Grove. The authorization came with the caveat that there already was a "Spencer Grove" in Iowa, so they needed to change the name; the residents opted to drop "Grove" and henceforth the name of the town was simply "Spencer". Romanzo Coates, already the superintendent of schools, was also made the town's first postmaster, with his cabin used as the first post office.

In 1869, Garrett Marcellus moved to Spencer and established a mill on the Little Sioux River about one mile downstream. This was Spencer's first real business outside of the goods being sold out of J.W. Masten's cabin. Several businesses soon followed: Peeso & Burgin's General Store and Tuttle & Smith both opened in 1870, as did a wagon shop, butcher shop and a blacksmith.

The plat for the Town of Spencer was filed on May 8, 1871, and approved by Judge Snyder of Iowa's 4th District Court. This marks the official founding of Spencer, Iowa. That year also saw the addition of several more businesses, including a hotel and hardware store.

By this time, the population around Spencer had surpassed that of Peterson, the County Seat located in the far southeastern corner of the county. A petition was passed to move the seat to the more centrally located Spencer; the motion passed 359–200 and in October 1871, the seat of government for Clay County was moved from Peterson to Spencer. At the time, Spencer lacked any building suitable for a courthouse, so residents pooled money and talent to build a two-story, 20x40 building on Main Street. This was subsequently purchased by the county for $1333 and used as the courthouse.

Between June and September 1878, the Chicago, Milwaukee & St Paul Railway built a line west from Algona to Spencer. The line was completed in mid-September and regular service began on September 15. Along with the rail road came telegraph service, the poles having been constructed alongside the tracks.

Spencer was formally incorporated as the Town of Spencer on March 26, 1880, with a mayor and board of trustees. On March 21, 1892, it was re-incorporated as the City of Spencer, with a mayor and city council.

In 1899, growth was stimulated by construction of the Chicago, Milwaukee & St. Paul Railway to the settlement. The county seat operated as a trading center for a county devoted to farming. The railroad carried crops and products into and out of the area.

A 1931 fire, ignited by a dropped sparkler, destroyed more than 100 buildings in the town. Using the case of the Spencer Fire along with the Remsen Fire of 1936, the state legislature banned almost all fireworks until 2017, when a relaxed law was passed. As of yet, Spencer has not authorized fireworks sale or use in the city. (Exception: During the legal periods, one can apply for a permit to sell.)

=== 2024 flooding ===
On June 22, 2024, a massive flood submerged much of the city and caused power outages for almost a full month. It began when both the Little Sioux and Ocheyedan rivers overflowed due to heavy rainfall.

The floods damaged over 2,500 homes and businesses with at least 1,000 beyond repair. Many Spencer residents were left homeless in the aftermath. One man was killed. The flooding here was the result of a larger system of storms that saw roughly 4–6 inches of rain dumped on various counties in northwest Iowa, southeastern South Dakota and southern Minnesota in a 24-hour period.

Clay County received approximately 14 total inches of rain the week of the flooding, of which 4.76 in. came the night of June 22.

On June 24, President Joe Biden approved a request for a disaster declaration in the state of Iowa which would allocate federal funds for flood victims in Clay, Emmet, Kossuth, Plymouth and Sioux Counties.

According to Spencer Fire Chief Jesse Coulson, firefighters rescued at least 383 people from the floodwaters but added that the number could easily be as high as 700 as not all water rescues were documented. Numerous individuals were pulled from their rooftops via helicopter.

On June 30, workers from FEMA began canvassing Clay County and working with homeowners affected by the floods.

== Geography ==
According to the United States Census Bureau, the city has a total area of 11.18 square miles (28.96 km^{2}), of which 11.01 square miles (28.52 km^{2}) is land and 0.17 square miles (0.44 km^{2}) is water.

=== Climate ===
Climate data for Spencer 1 N, Iowa (1991−2020 normals, extremes 1895−present)
| Month | Jan | Feb | Mar | Apr | May | Jun | Jul | Aug | Sep | Oct | Nov | Dec | Year |
|---|---|---|---|---|---|---|---|---|---|---|---|---|---|
| Record high °F (°C) | 66 (19) | 67 (19) | 88 (31) | 95 (35) | 109 (43) | 106 (41) | 113 (45) | 111 (44) | 102 (39) | 95 (35) | 80 (27) | 67 (19) | 113 (45) |
| Mean daily maximum °F (°C) | 25.1 (−3.8) | 29.8 (−1.2) | 43.0 (6.1) | 57.7 (14.3) | 69.9 (21.1) | 80.3 (26.8) | 83.7 (28.7) | 81.0 (27.2) | 74.6 (23.7) | 60.2 (15.7) | 43.6 (6.4) | 30.0 (−1.1) | 56.6 (13.7) |
| Daily mean °F (°C) | 16.1 (−8.8) | 20.6 (−6.3) | 33.3 (0.7) | 46.3 (7.9) | 58.6 (14.8) | 69.3 (20.7) | 72.7 (22.6) | 70.0 (21.1) | 62.4 (16.9) | 48.7 (9.3) | 33.8 (1.0) | 21.3 (−5.9) | 46.1 (7.8) |
| Mean daily minimum °F (°C) | 7.0 (−13.9) | 11.4 (−11.4) | 23.7 (−4.6) | 34.9 (1.6) | 47.4 (8.6) | 58.3 (14.6) | 61.8 (16.6) | 59.0 (15.0) | 50.2 (10.1) | 37.3 (2.9) | 23.9 (−4.5) | 12.7 (−10.7) | 35.6 (2.0) |
| Record low °F (°C) | −38 (−39) | −36 (−38) | −28 (−33) | 0 (−18) | 20 (−7) | 30 (−1) | 40 (4) | 34 (1) | 21 (−6) | −8 (−22) | −17 (−27) | −30 (−34) | −38 (−39) |
| Average precipitation inches (mm) | 0.72 (18) | 0.79 (20) | 1.66 (42) | 3.49 (89) | 4.19 (106) | 4.60 (117) | 3.74 (95) | 3.77 (96) | 3.29 (84) | 2.35 (60) | 1.41 (36) | 0.98 (25) | 30.99 (787) |
| Average snowfall inches (cm) | 9.8 (25) | 8.9 (23) | 5.9 (15) | 3.0 (7.6) | 0.1 (0.25) | 0.0 (0.0) | 0.0 (0.0) | 0.0 (0.0) | 0.0 (0.0) | 0.7 (1.8) | 5.3 (13) | 9.6 (24) | 43.3 (110) |
| Average precipitation days (≥ 0.01 in) | 6.3 | 5.9 | 7.5 | 10.7 | 12.7 | 11.5 | 8.8 | 8.7 | 8.2 | 8.1 | 6.1 | 6.5 | 101.0 |
| Average snowy days (≥ 0.1 in) | 5.5 | 5.2 | 3.4 | 1.4 | 0.0 | 0.0 | 0.0 | 0.0 | 0.0 | 0.4 | 2.8 | 5.2 | 23.9 |
Source: NOAA

== Demographics ==
Historical population
| Census | Pop. | Note | %± |
|---|---|---|---|
| 1880 | 824 | | — |
| 1890 | 1,813 | | 120.0% |
| 1900 | 3,095 | | 70.7% |
| 1910 | 3,005 | | −2.9% |
| 1920 | 4,599 | | 53.0% |
| 1930 | 5,019 | | 9.1% |
| 1940 | 6,599 | | 31.5% |
| 1950 | 7,446 | | 12.8% |
| 1960 | 8,864 | | 19.0% |
| 1970 | 10,278 | | 16.0% |
| 1980 | 11,726 | | 14.1% |
| 1990 | 11,066 | | −5.6% |
| 2000 | 11,317 | | 2.3% |
| 2010 | 11,233 | | −0.7% |
| 2020 | 11,325 | | 0.8% |
U.S. Decennial Census

=== 2020 census ===
As of the 2020 census, Spencer had a population of 11,325, with 5,066 households and 2,937 families. The median age was 41.9 years. 22.7% of residents were under the age of 18. For every 100 females there were 92.4 males, and for every 100 females age 18 and over there were 91.1 males age 18 and over.

The population density was 1,034.5 inhabitants per square mile (399.4/km^{2}). There were 5,606 housing units at an average density of 512.1 per square mile (197.7/km^{2}). Of all housing units, 9.6% were vacant; the homeowner vacancy rate was 1.8% and the rental vacancy rate was 11.7%.

Among households, 25.9% had children under the age of 18 living in them. Of all households, 43.8% were married-couple households, 6.9% were cohabiting-couple households, 20.7% were households with a male householder and no spouse or partner present, and 28.6% were households with a female householder and no spouse or partner present. 42.0% were non-family households, 36.9% were made up of individuals, and 16.7% had someone living alone who was 65 years of age or older.

24.7% of residents were under the age of 20; 4.8% were from 20 to 24; 24.0% were from 25 to 44; 24.0% were from 45 to 64; and 22.5% were 65 years of age or older. The gender makeup of the city was 48.0% male and 52.0% female.

96.8% of residents lived in urban areas, while 3.2% lived in rural areas.

Racial composition as of the 2020 census
| Race | Number | Percent |
|---|---|---|
| White | 10,387 | 91.7% |
| Black or African American | 86 | 0.8% |
| American Indian and Alaska Native | 45 | 0.4% |
| Asian | 96 | 0.8% |
| Native Hawaiian and Other Pacific Islander | 6 | 0.1% |
| Some other race | 224 | 2.0% |
| Two or more races | 481 | 4.2% |
| Hispanic or Latino (of any race) | 566 | 5.0% |

=== 2010 census ===
As of the census of 2010, there were 11,233 people, 5,018 households, and 3,009 families residing in the city. The population density was 1,020.3 inhabitants per square mile (393.9/km^{2}). There were 5,431 housing units at an average density of 493.3 per square mile (190.5/km^{2}). The racial makeup of the city was 96.0% White, 0.5% African American, 0.3% Native American, 0.7% Asian, 1.3% from other races, and 1.2% from two or more races. Hispanic or Latino people of any race were 3.5% of the population.

There were 5,018 households, of which 27.4% had children under the age of 18 living with them, 47.0% were married couples living together, 9.5% had a female householder with no husband present, 3.4% had a male householder with no wife present, and 40.0% were non-families. 34.7% of all households were made up of individuals, and 16.2% had someone living alone who was 65 years of age or older. The average household size was 2.19 and the average family size was 2.80.

The median age in the city was 41.5 years. 23% of residents were under the age of 18; 7.6% were between the ages of 18 and 24; 23.3% were from 25 to 44; 26.5% were from 45 to 64; and 19.7% were 65 years of age or older. The gender makeup of the city was 47.7% male and 52.3% female.

=== 2000 census ===
As of the census of 2000, there were 11,317 people, 4,842 households, and 3,011 families residing in the city. The population density was 1,118.1 inhabitants per square mile (431.7/km^{2}). There were 5,151 housing units at an average density of 508.9 per square mile (196.5/km^{2}). The racial makeup of the city was 97.57% White, 0.14% African American, 0.13% Native American, 1.11% Asian, 0.04% Pacific Islander, 0.34% from other races, and 0.65% from two or more races. Hispanic or Latino people of any race were 1.43% of the population.

There were 4,842 households, out of which 29.3% had children under the age of 18 living with them, 51.4% were married couples living together, 7.7% had a female householder with no husband present, and 37.8% were non-families. 33.0% of all households were made up of individuals, and 15.1% had someone living alone who was 65 years of age or older. The average household size was 2.28 and the average family size was 2.89.

Age spread: 23.8% under the age of 18, 8.9% from 18 to 24, 26.7% from 25 to 44, 21.3% from 45 to 64, and 19.4% who were 65 years of age or older. The median age was 39 years. For every 100 females, there were 88.0 males. For every 100 females age 18 and over, there were 85.4 males.

The median income for a household in the city was $32,970, and the median income for a family was $43,145. Males had a median income of $30,537 versus $21,709 for females. The per capita income for the city was $19,153. About 7.3% of families and 9.5% of the population were below the poverty line, including 13.3% of those under age 18 and 10.0% of those age 65 or over.

== Arts and culture ==
In 2004, Spencer's downtown business district was recognized as historic and listed on the National Register of Historic Places. As the county seat and a railroad stop, Spencer also served as a center of trade for the farming county.

Also in 2004, the State Historical Society of Iowa certified the Spencer Downtown Cultural District as one of the initial eight such projects across the state. Spencer's proposal for this designation included remodeling the old Spencer Middle School building as a multi-purpose facility, to include a senior citizen center, affordable housing units, and a restored facade. Future work on the project for the former Middle School will restore the historic auditorium. The State Historical Society designation also recognizes the city's renovation of its Grand Avenue bridge to include a public art work: commissioned stained glass plates in an Art Deco style.

Current cultural attractions in Spencer include the Spencer Community Theater the Parker House Museum, Clay County Heritage, and various public art displays. Arts on Grand is a cultural attraction and nonprofit organization which supports local area artists with a gallery shop, exhibits, classes, workshops, tours, fundraising events, and other activities. The Curiel-Reynolds School of Visual Arts (CRVA) relocated from Detroit, Michigan to Spencer in 2007.

Spencer's Public Library is where the library cat known as Dewey Readmore Books resided from January 18, 1988, until his death on November 29, 2006. His story, with much about the town of Spencer, is told in Dewey: The Small-Town Library Cat Who Touched the World (2008), by Vicki Myron with Bret Witter, and related children's versions and audio books. Numerous works of art around town feature images of Dewey including “The Gathering: Of Time, Of Land, Of Many Hands," a community mosaic project designed to celebrate the Millennium.

== Radio stations ==
- KICD-FM (107.7 FM)
- KICD-AM (1240 AM)
- KUYY (100.1 FM)
- KMRR (104.9 FM)

== Education ==
The Spencer Community School District operates public schools.

== Transportation ==
=== Roads ===
U.S. Routes 18 and 71 run concurrently for approximately 3 miles (5 km) through Spencer.

=== Air ===
The Spencer Municipal Airport is located 3 mi (4.8 km) northwest of the business district of Spencer. Great Lakes Airlines was formerly headquartered there. At the height of Great Lake's service, the airline provided non-stop flights to several locations in the continental United States using Beechcraft 1900D and EMB Brasilia aircraft. The airline has since relocated to Cheyenne, Wyoming.

The fixed-base operator is Leading Edge Aviation. They provide aircraft charters, rentals and flight instruction.

== Notable people ==
- Alice Cook Fuller, educator, writer, school superintendent
- Michelle D. Johnson Lieutenant General in the United Air Force and 19th Superintendent of the U.S. Air Force Academy
- Connie Kunzmann, professional basketball player
- Vicki Myron, co-author of Dewey: The Small-Town Library Cat Who Touched the World
- Roger Neumann, jazz saxophonist, flutist, composer, arranger, and music educator
- Ronald Roskens, academic
- Robert Suderburg, composer, conductor, and pianist
- Robin Thede, actress and comedian, host of The Rundown; creator of and actress on A Black Lady Sketch Show
- Richard L. Tierney, author and poet
- Linda Wejcman, Minnesota legislator

== See also ==
- Clay County Courthouse
