= Dewey: The Small-Town Library Cat Who Touched the World =

2008 non-fiction book by Vicki Myron and Bret Witter

Dewey: The Library Cat
- Author: Vicki Myron; Bret Witter
- Cover artist: Front cover photo of Dewey by Rick Krebsbach
- Language: English
- Subject: Dewey Readmore Books
- Genre: Non-fiction
- Publisher: Grand Central Publishing
- Publication date: 2008
- Publication place: United States
- Pages: 304
- ISBN: 978-0-446-40741-0
- OCLC: 191865523
- LC Class: SF445.5 .M97 2008
- Followed by: Dewey's Nine Lives: The Legacy of the Small-Town Library Cat Who Inspired Millions

Dewey: The Small-Town Library Cat Who Touched the World is a best-selling non-fiction book published in September 2008. The book recounts the life of Dewey Readmore Books, the cat in residence at the Spencer Public Library in Spencer, Iowa.

Grand Central Publishing paid $1.2 million to Vicki Myron, head librarian, and co-author Bret Witter for the rights to the cat's life story. In addition to discussing Dewey's life from his discovery in the library drop bin on a cold winter's night, to his unlikely fame, to his death in 2006, Myron covers issues in her life as she dealt with illness and the challenges of being a single mother. Dewey is portrayed as a loving cat who primarily lived in the library and connected with patrons.

The book was also published in London and translated into numerous languages. It "sold more than a million copies worldwide and stayed on bestseller lists for six months." While a film adaptation was discussed in 2008, with Meryl Streep to play Myron, the project was never fully developed. As of May 2012, a final script had not been approved and the option was due to expire in June.

The book's success led to two different children's editions being adapted from this story, for readers of different levels, as well as different editions of audiobooks for children and adults. Myron and Witter published a sequel in 2011, Dewey's Nine Lives and a children's picture book that same year.

== Reception ==
A reviewer for Teacher Librarian wrote, "Any cat lover or pet owner should be charmed by this story of a wonderful feline."

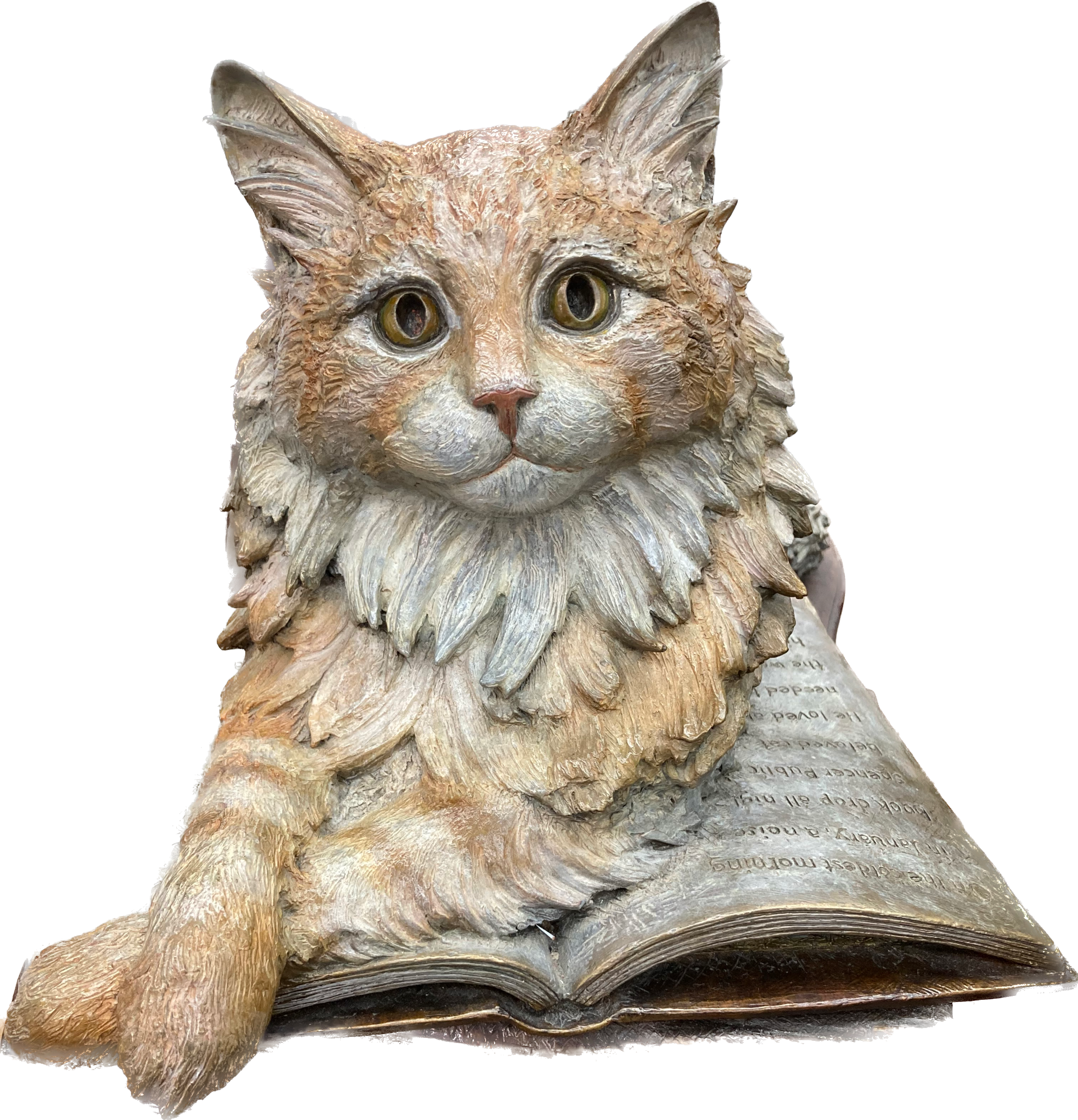
Life-size statue of Dewey, displayed at Spencer library

== Adaptations ==
This was also published as an audiobook in 2008.

In November 2008, it was announced that a feature film was being adapted from the book, and was expected to star Meryl Streep as Myron. The project is still listed on IMDb as "in development". As of May 2012, a final script had not been produced, and the option was due to expire in June 2012.

== Variations and sequels ==
The success of the book for adults inspired Myron and Witter and their publishers to create different adaptations and editions for children, variations of the original account, as well as a sequel for adults.

- Dewey: There's a Cat in the Library! (2009) is a picture book written for younger children, a variation of the book written for adult audiences. Published by R.R. Bowker, it has watercolor illustrations.

The School Library Journal (SLJ) said,

This heartwarming picture book is based on the authors' adult title, Dewey (Grand Central, 2008). It describes how on a cold night Myron found a tiny kitten in the return box at Spencer Public Library in Iowa, and the feline's impact on the library community. Dewey Readmore Books overcame unpleasant encounters with young children who picked him up upside down or petted him the wrong way and settled in, "happy" to help people. The realistic illustrations, done in vibrant watercolors, bring the tale to life (the orange cat's expressions are priceless). The story moves along swiftly, and will be a hit with readers requesting animal books.

A reviewer at School Librarian wrote,

The attractive full colour illustrations have a photographic quality while the children reflect a variety of backgrounds. Paw print end papers are well-matched to this heart-warming story... The observation that Dewey 'read with the mummies and grandmas [and] helped the daddies work' may well be true but could be interpreted as gender stereotyping in a 21st century library. Nonetheless this is an endearing read which will appeal to children under eight and librarians/catlovers of all ages.

- Another children's version, Dewey: The True Story of a World-Famous Library Cat (2010), also known as Dewey: The Library Cat, was written for middle-grade readers and also published by R.R. Bowker.

SLJ reviewed Dewey: The True Story of a World-Famous Library Cat:

Myron's best seller about the resident cat at the Spencer Public Library in Iowa has been adapted for middle grade readers. The references to most of the author's personal problems, which peppered her adult book, have been removed, and Dewey's story stands on its own... astute readers will also pick up on the message that a town's heart beats strongest in its library.

- An audiobook, Dewey the Library Cat (Brilliance Audio, 2011) was published by R.R. Bowker. The reviewer for SLJ wrote:

Dewey's story is heartwarming and amusing as the cat wins over even the most recalcitrant of patrons. Children will giggle at his antics, delight in his eccentricities, and mourn his eventual passing. Laura Hamilton narrates the chapter book with panache and warmth.

- Myron and Witter wrote a sequel adult book, Dewey's Nine Lives: The Legacy of the Small-Town Library Cat Who Inspired Millions (New York: Dutton, 2010; ISBN 9780525951865). It includes tales about other cats as well. It was also published as an audiobook by Penguin Audio in 2010.It also received positive reviews. The Globe and Mail wrote, "Myron tells a series of frankly sad stories about people and cats knocked about by life... Each story is, by turns, bleak and uplifting... The writing is plain and direct, and largely devoid of sentimentality."
- That year they also published another illustrated children's book: Dewey's Christmas at the Library (2010).

== Publication details ==
- Dewey: The Small-Town Library Cat Who Touched the World. Large-print edition with slightly different title. New York: Grand Central Publishing Large Print, 2008. ISBN 978-0-446-54119-0. 464 pp.
- Dewey: The Small-Town Library Cat Who Touched the World. Audiobook on CD. New York, NY: Hachette Audio, 2008. ISBN 9781600243820. Read by Suzanne Toren.
- Dewey: A Small Town, a Library and the World's Most Beloved Cat. London: Hodder & Stoughton, 2008. ISBN 9780340953945.
- Dewey: El Gatito de Biblioteca que Conquisto el Mundo. Spanish translation. United States: Suma, 2008. ISBN 9781603966481.
- Dewey: um Gato entre Livros. São Paulo: Globo, 2008. Translated into Portuguese by Helena Londres. ISBN 9788525045799. 266 pp.
- Dewey: There's a Cat in the Library! Juvenile ed. Illustrated by Steve James. New York: Little, Brown, 2009. ISBN 9780316068741.
- Dewey. Leicester: Ulverscroft, 2009. Large-print ed. ISBN 9781847828224.
- Dewey the Library Cat: A True Story. Adapted for primary school readers by Roberta Edwards; illustrated by Mirella Monesi. New York: Grosset & Dunlap, 2009. ISBN 9780448453323.
- Dewey. Miami, FL: Suma De Letras, 2009. Translated into Spanish by Isabel Murillo Fort. ISBN 9781603966481.
- Dewey. İstanbul: Pegasus, 2009. Translated into Turkish by Suna Develioğlu. ISBN 9786055943578. 303 pp.
- Dewey the Library Cat: A True Story. Adapted for middle school readers. New York: Little, Brown, 2010.
- Dewey the Library Cat: A True Story. Audiobook on CD. Grand Haven: Brilliance Audio, 2010. Read by Laura Hamilton.
- Dewey: The True Story of a World-Famous Library Cat. Adapted for young readers. London: Simon & Schuster Children's, 2010. ISBN 9781847388445. 214 pp.
- Dewey: A Small Town, a Library and the World's Most Beloved Cat. Bath, England: BBC Audiobooks, 2010. Read by Lorelei King. ISBN 1408435489.
- Dewey. New York: Hachette Audio, 2010. ISBN 1607886219. Read by Susan McInerney.
- Dewey, le Petit Chat de la Bibliothèque. Translated into French by Claudine Azoulay. Toronto: Editions Scholastic, 2010. ISBN 9781443103183. 36 pp.
- Dewey: Un Gato en la Biblioteca! Translation of Dewey: There's a Cat in the Library! by Teresa Blanch. Barcelona: Edebe, 2011. ISBN 9788423699155.

The book has been translated into Chinese, Hebrew, Italian, Korean, Polish, Romanian, Russian, Slovenian and other languages.
