= Browser (cat) =

Library cat in White Settlement, Texas, United States

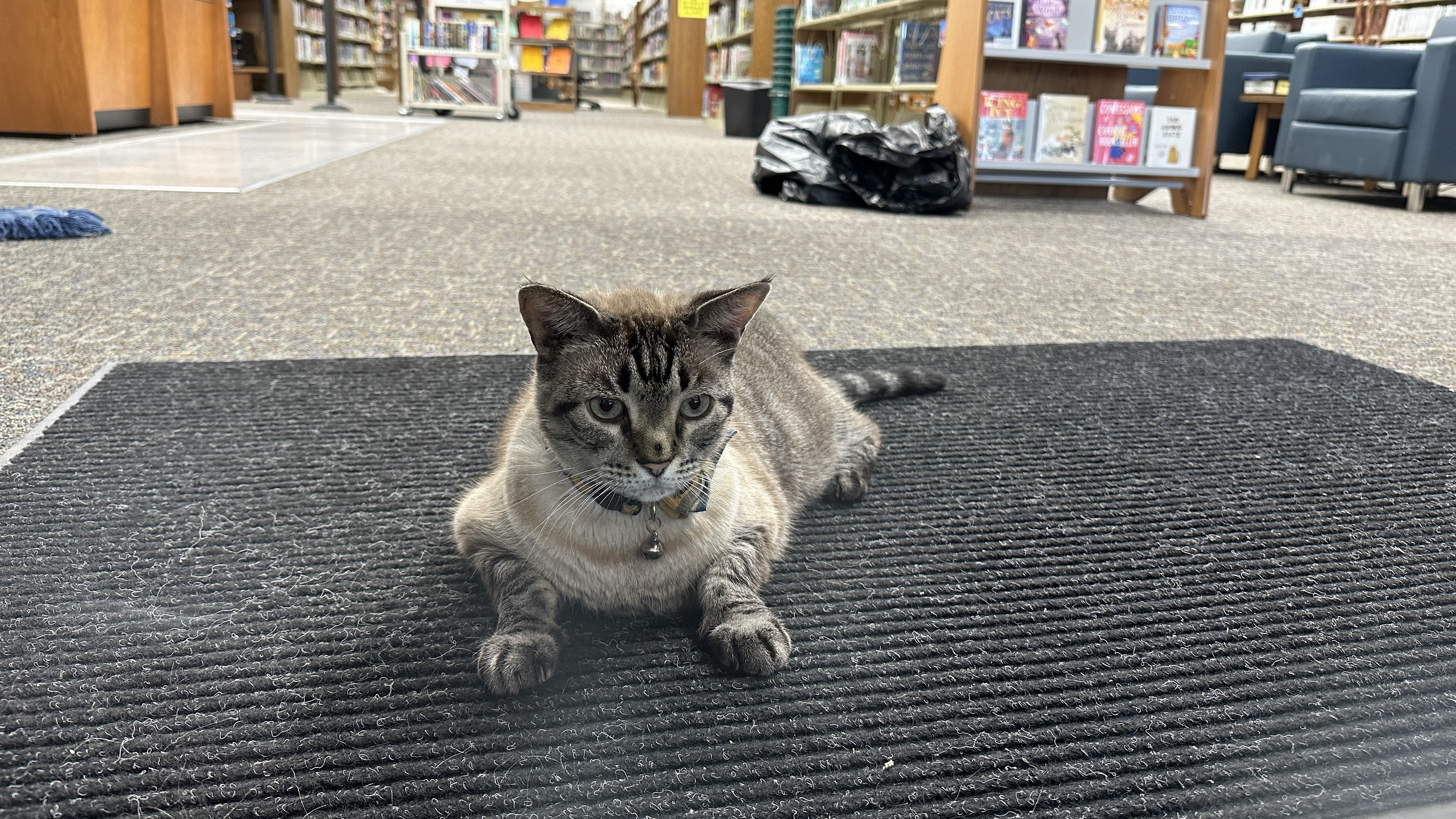
- Browser in August 2023
- Species: Felis catus
- Sex: Male
- Born: c. 2010
- Died: September 3, 2025
- Notable role: Library cat at White Settlement Public Library in Texas, United States
- Known for: City Council eviction attempts

Browser was an American library cat that lived in the White Settlement Public Library, near Fort Worth, Texas, United States. In July 2016, Browser was evicted from the library by the local municipality, provoking an international backlash that resulted in a re-vote, and a unanimous decision permitting him to stay. Browser died on September 3, 2025 of natural causes.

== Eviction attempt ==
Browser, a grey tabby, was adopted by White Settlement Public Library from a local animal shelter in October 2010. Originally he was obtained to control rodents, but later became a popular mascot of the library among patrons, even featuring in the library's fundraising calendar.

On June 14, 2016, White Settlement City Council voted by a majority of two to one votes to remove Browser from the library. The removal motion was made by councillor Elzie Clements, who claimed, “City Hall and City businesses are no place for animals”, and council member Paul Moore, who was primarily concerned about triggering people with allergies to cats. Mayor Ron White claimed that the motion to remove Browser was a response to a council worker not being permitted to bring his puppy to City Hall.

== Later developments ==
In response to the eviction decision, a petition to permit Browser to remain in the library attracted over 12,000 signatures worldwide, and Mayor White received over 1,500 emails advocating for Browser to be permitted to remain in the library. On July 1, 2016, White Settlement City Council unanimously voted to reverse its earlier eviction decision.

Browser was subsequently dubbed by the mayor as "Library Cat for Life".

Browser was featured in the library's yearly calendar as a fundraiser, effectively bringing in more money than he cost.

On December 13, 2016, Clements again tried to bring the council to vote to remove Browser, claiming “I’m a council member and I can put anything I want on the consent agenda”, but the motion did not pass. This would be the last meeting attended by Councilman Clements as an elected official. Clements had been defeated decisively during his council re-election bid in November 2016, and died on January 1, 2022.

Browser died on September 3, 2025 of natural causes.

== See also ==
- List of individual cats
