= KitKat (cat) =

Bodega cat killed by a Waymo car in 2025

- Species: Felis catus
- Breed: Tabby cat
- Sex: Male
- Born: 2015 or 2016
- Died: October 28, 2025 (aged 9); Mission District, San Francisco, California, U.S.
- Cause of death: Hit by autonomous car
- Occupation: Bodega cat
- Years active: ca. 2018–2025
- Named after: Kit Kat candy bar

KitKat (2015—2016 — October 28, 2025) was a bodega cat from the Mission District of San Francisco who was killed by a Waymo car on October 27, 2025. Locals built altars in its memory and the cat's death has raised concerns about the safety of self-driving cars.

== Life ==
Mike Zeidan, the owner of Randa's Market, adopted KitKat as a stray to help keep rodents out of his store. KitKat lived in Randa's Market for six years and was well-loved by the neighborhood, including an appearance on a shop cats map that went viral in 2022 as a "particularly friendly cat". After KitKat arrived at the bodega, customers were said to come more often, and regularly brought the cat food and gifts.

== Death ==
At around 11:40 pm on October 27, 2025, witnesses saw KitKat sitting in front of a stopped Waymo car for seven seconds. He walked under the car as the car pulled out, and the right rear tire ran over the back half of his body. A bartender who was taking a cigarette break used a sandwich board sign as a stretcher and took KitKat to an emergency animal clinic. An hour later, KitKat was pronounced dead. Waymo confirmed that the cat was killed by one of its vehicles on October 30. Surveillance footage of the incident was released in December.

From Waymo's report to the National Highway Traffic Safety Administration (NHTSA):

The Waymo AV was stopped next to the curb for a passenger pickup facing east on 16th Street. As the passengers were boarding the Waymo AV, a cat approached the Waymo AV from the southern sidewalk of 16th Street and sat in the roadway partially under the front right corner of the Waymo AV. A pedestrian approached the Waymo AV from the east on the southern sidewalk of 16th Street and began crouching near the front of the Waymo AV, stepping partially into the roadway, appearing to reach for the cat. As they did so, the cat moved farther from the sidewalk under the Waymo AV and the pedestrian stepped back onto the sidewalk. The Waymo AV then departed the pickup location and the rear right tire made contact with the cat. At the time of impact, the Waymo AV's Level 4 ADS was engaged in autonomous mode. Waymo later received notice that the cat did not survive. The passengers in the Waymo AV did not have seatbelts fastened at the time, having just boarded the Waymo AV.

Prior to KitKat's death, the NHTSA had logged 14 collisions between Waymo cars and animals, of which 5 were confirmed fatalities.

== Aftermath ==
After KitKat's death, an altar was created outside Randa's Market. People left flowers, candles, cat food, written notes, and Kit Kat candy bars in the cat's honor. A city worker took down the memorial for fire safety reasons, but neighbors built it again.

Local supervisor Jackie Fielder held a rally called "Justice for KitKat" in support of a non-binding San Francisco resolution to shift decision-making about the operation of self-driving cars from the state to individual counties. Critics say that the resolution is performative because it is non-binding, that local control would make autonomous vehicle operation impractical, and that Waymo is still far less dangerous to animals than human drivers. Elon Musk commented that "many pets will be saved by autonomy".

== See also ==
- Death of Elaine Herzberg
