= White Settlement Independent School District =

School district in Texas

Location
- 8224 White Settlement Road, Fort Worth, TX 76108 United States of America

District information
- Type: Public
- Motto: Think Big … Bears Do!
- Grades: Pre-K through 12
- Superintendent: Frank Molinar
- Governing agency: Texas Education Agency
- Budget: $62.3 million
- NCES District ID: 4845540

Students and staff
- Students: 6,808
- Teachers: 428.22
- Staff: 819.4

Other information
- Website: www.wsisd.com

White Settlement Independent School District is a public school district based in White Settlement, Texas. The district serves students in White Settlement and a portion of Fort Worth in west central Tarrant County.

In 2009, the school district was rated "academically acceptable" by the Texas Education Agency.

== Schools ==
- Brewer High School
- Brewer Middle School
- Blue Haze Elementary School (Fort Worth)
- Liberty Elementary School
- North Elementary STEAM Academy (Fort Worth)
- West Early Learners Academy
- Fine Arts Academy at Tannahill (Fort Worth)
- RISE Alternative Campus

== Students ==
=== Academics ===
STAAR - Percent at Level II Satisfactory Standard or Above (Sum of All Grades Tested)
Subject	White Settlement ISD	Region 11	State of Texas
Reading	73%	76%	76%
Mathematics	65%	72%	72%
Science	77%	77%	78%
Soc. Studies	70%	77%	78%
All Tests	70%	75%	75%

Students in White Settlement typically perform close to local region and statewide averages on standardized tests. In 2024-2025 State of Texas Assessments of Academic Readiness (STAAR) results, 70% of students in White Settlement ISD met Level II Satisfactory standards, compared with 75% in Region 11 and 75% in the state of Texas. The average SAT score of the class of 2023-2024 was 891, and the average ACT score was 16.4.

=== Demographics ===
In the 2024-2025 school year, the school district had a total of 6,808 students, ranging from early childhood education and pre-kindergarten through grade 12. The class of 2023 included 557 graduates; the annual drop-out rate across grades 9-12 was 1.8%.

As of the 2024-2025 school year, the ethnic distribution of the school district was 32.6% White, 47.5% Hispanic, 12% African American, 1.2% Asian, 0.5% American Indian, 0.3% Pacific Islander, and 5.9% from two or more races. Economically disadvantaged students made up 53.8% of the student body.
