= Bodega cat =

Cat that inhabits a store to prevent rodent infestations

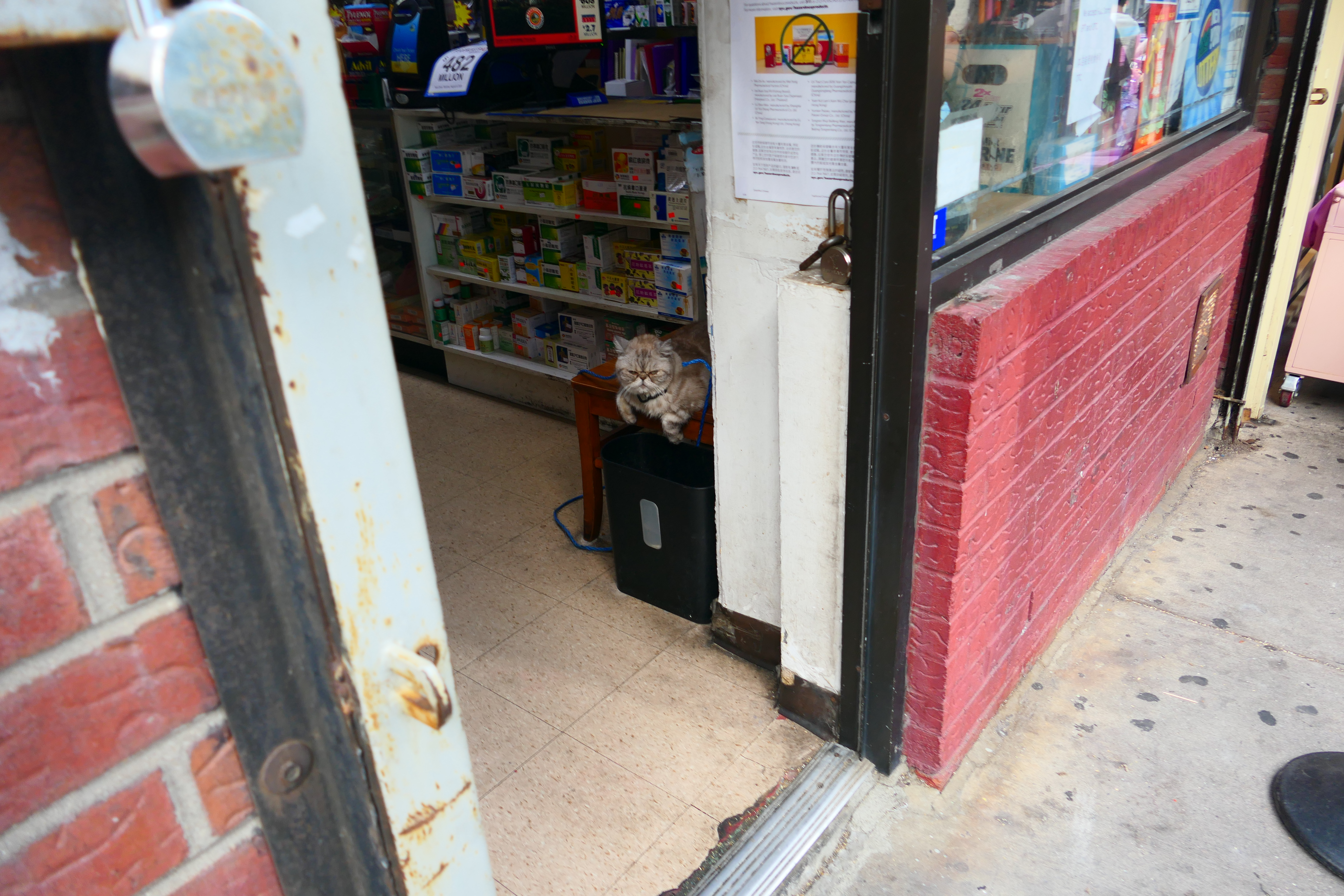
A bodega cat in Flushing, Queens, New York City

A bodega cat, also known as a deli cat, store cat, shop cat, is a type of working cat that inhabits a bodega, which in New York City English refers to a convenience store or deli. Like other working cats, a bodega cat is typically a domestic shorthair kept as a form of biological pest control to manage or prevent rodent infestations.

A bodega cat may be a domesticated cat that is kept by the bodega owner, or a semi-feral cat that the bodega owner attracts to the store through regular feeding. Public health departments typically prohibit bodega cats under food codes that ban live animals from establishments where consumable goods are sold.

== History ==
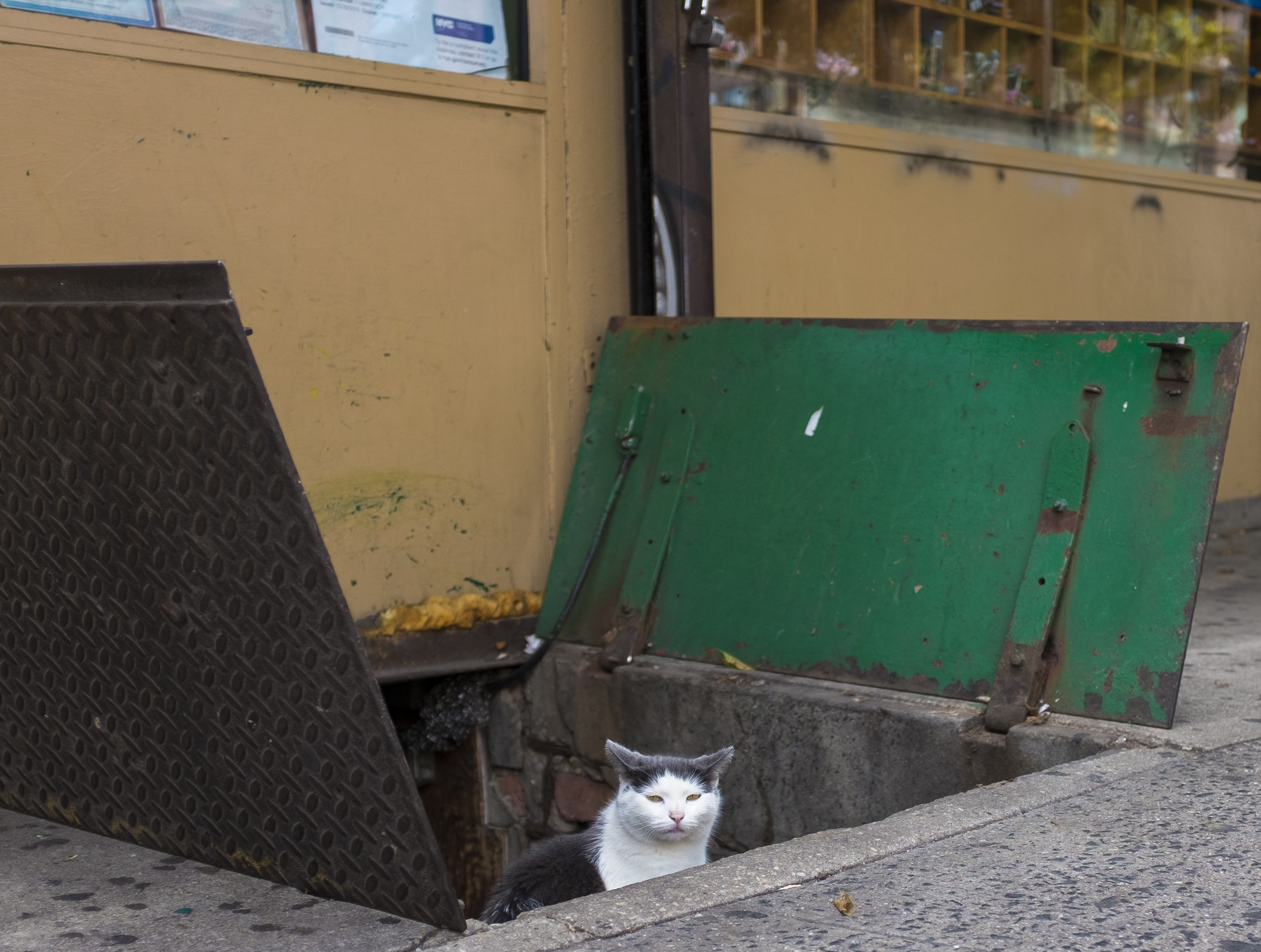
A bodega cat in Hudson Square, Manhattan, New York City

As early as the 1890s, cats have been documented in New York as working animals within the postal system. As of 2025, it is estimated that "between 30 and 40% of bodegas in New York City probably have cats."

== Legality ==
The New York City Department of Health and Mental Hygiene considers bodega cats a "general deficiency", citing concerns over the potential they pose for food contamination. Under Chapter 23 of the Food Service Establishment Violation Penalty Schedule, establishments selling food that keep live animals that are not service animals or fish kept in tanks are subject to a fine ranging from $200 to $350. Despite this, cats remain a ubiquitous presence at many of the more than 10,000 bodegas across New York City; The New York Times reports that many bodega owners keep cats in spite of the law because they are seen as preferable to rodent infestations, which also carry a fine of $300.

== In popular culture ==
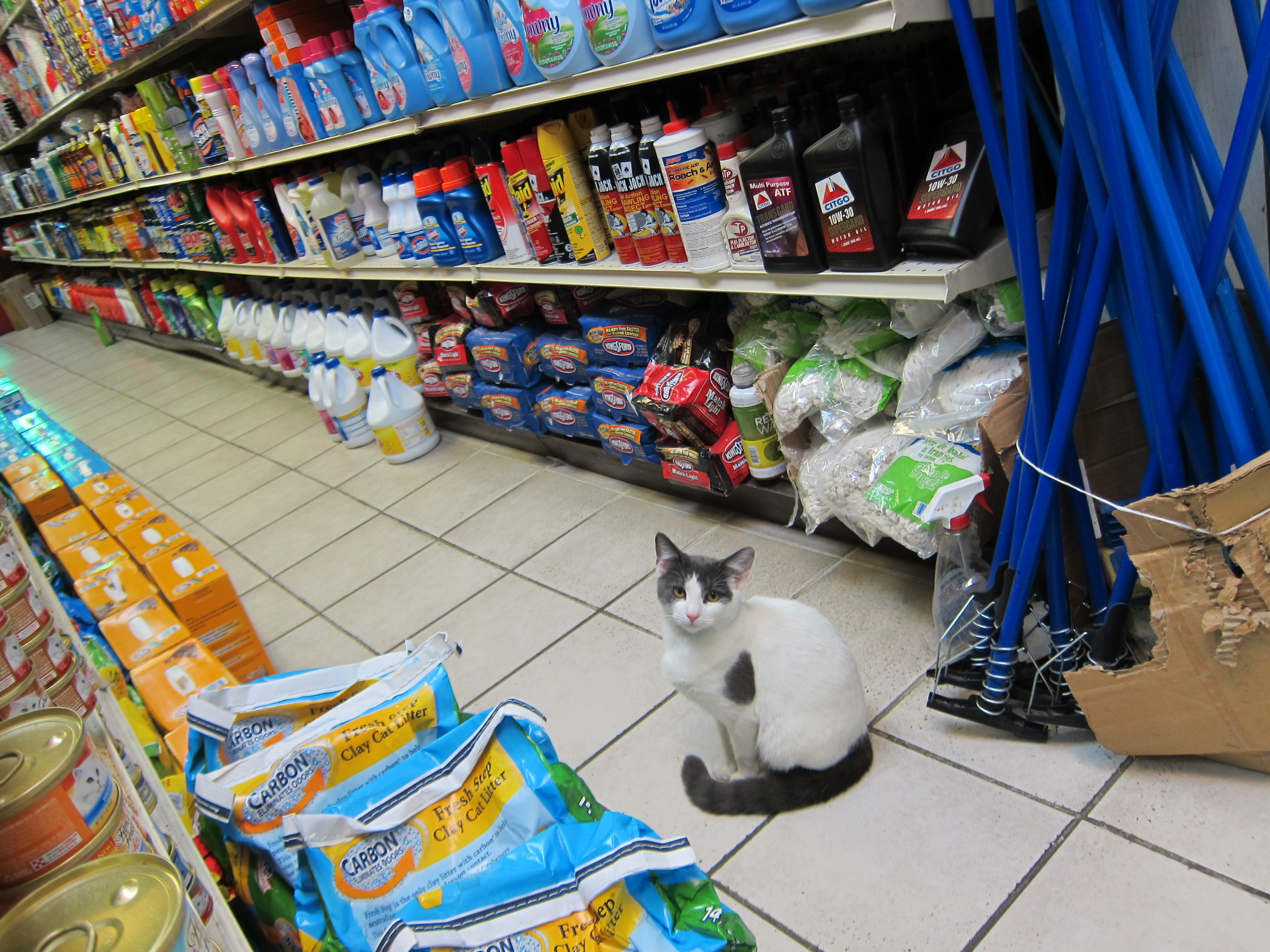
A bodega cat showing her wide array of goods in Greenpoint, Brooklyn, New York City

Bodega cats are a part of internet culture, as well as New York City culture. Multiple blogs and social media accounts are devoted to chronicling photographs of bodega cats across the city. In 2019, a Saturday Night Live sketch starring John Mulaney parodied the musical Cats using a bodega cat. That same year, a bodega cat at 71 Fresh Deli and Grocery in Kips Bay, Manhattan, was stolen from the store; the cat's theft was widely covered in New York City media, with The New York Times, New York Daily News, and NY1 reporting on the incident.

== See also ==
- Farm cat
- KitKat (cat)
- Ship's cat
