= Hermitage cats =

Cat colony in a museum in Saint Petersburg, Russia

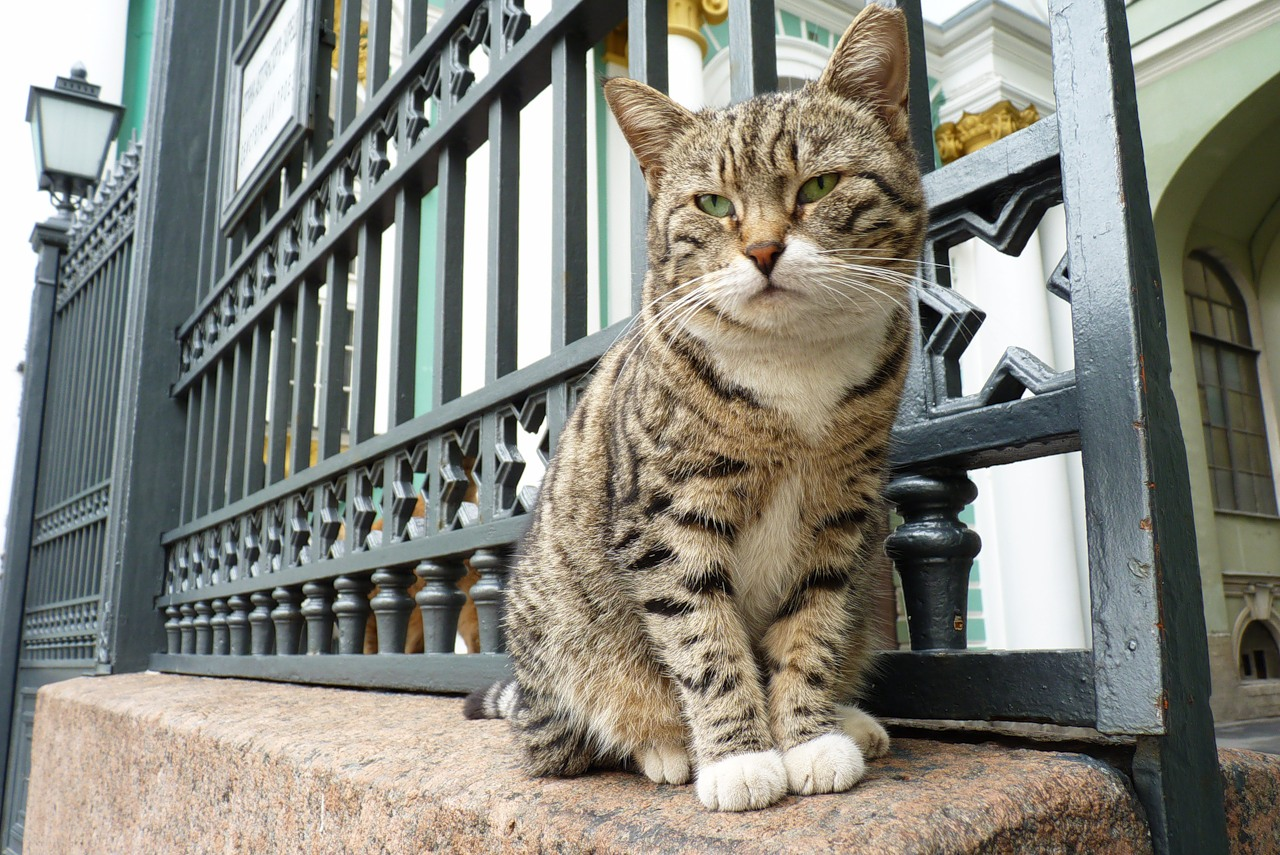
One of the Hermitage cats

The Hermitage cats (Russian: Эрмитажные коты) are a colony of working cats residing in the Hermitage Museum in Saint Petersburg, Russia. The museum has a press secretary dedicated to the cats, and three people act as caretakers. The cats live in the museum's basement, and they also appear on the embankment and on the square during summer. In previous eras, they roamed throughout the museum galleries.

== History ==
The cats have been present in the museum, originally the Winter Palace, since the 18th century; in 1745, Empress Elizabeth ordered cats to be placed in the palace in order to control the mice. She was presented by the city of Kazan in Tatarstan five of their best mousers to control the palace's rodent problem, as the city was known for having cats good at catching mice. They lived pampered lives and even had special servants until the October Revolution, after which they were cared for by specially appointed museum staff. The cats remained in St. Petersburg except during World War II, when the existing cat population was killed. A new group of cats replaced the previous cats, since the rat population had increased.

In the late 1990s, Maria Halttunen (Note: Also as "Khaltunin" or "Khaltunen". The "Khaltunin" spelling is from ABC News, "Haltunen" is from The New Yorker and "Halttunen" would be the correct Finnish spelling) began a programme to care for the cats, which previously lived in poor conditions. As of 2007, the museum began adopting cats needing homes.

In 2010, Halttunen, who directs the museum's cat programme, stated that there were 60 cats on the museum grounds, even though the staff has a joke that officially the museum is only supposed to have 50 cats. Irina Popovets, who became the head of the cat department, stated that the cats were "as well-known as our collections".

In 2011, the museum began a "Catfest", a celebration of its cat population. Catfest has included cat painting contests and scavenger hunts for children.

In May 2013, the count had grown to 74 neutered cats of both sexes, according to Haltunen. There are kitchens for preparing their food ("they all have different preferences"), and even a small hospital.

As of 2013, donations (a €400-per-month payment from the charity Pro Animale, and the sponsorship of Royal Canin) fund the presence of the cats.

Beginning in 2015, because of the number of visiting tourists, a website has been set up by the museum for people who may be interested in adopting a cat. "It is an honour to adopt a Hermitage cat", one potential cat owner was told.

== Hermitage Cat Day ==
Every spring, the Hermitage Museum holds Hermitage Cat Day (until 2012, the event was called March Cat Day at the Hermitage). The celebration was first held in 1998 and has been held regularly since 2005. Since 2011, the celebration has been included in the museum’s official calendar of commemorative and festive dates. In addition to honouring the cats, the event introduces children to art. It is usually held in April or early May.

On this day, all the cats are brought out for the public so that visitors can see them, and the basements and attics where the cats live are opened to visitors. During the celebration, cat-themed exhibitions, games, quizzes, and competitions for children and adults are organised; paintings from the Hermitage collection by famous masters depicting cats, as well as works by contemporary artists, are also presented.

A fairy-tale legend is associated with the cats, according to which they are cared for by magical little people called hermits and hermitesses. They live in museums and old houses, and at night they play with the cats, keep track of them, and knit “magic scarves” from their fur. Museum staff and admirers call the cats 'ermiks'.

== See also ==
- Working cat
- List of individual cats
