= Library cat =

Domestic cats that live in public libraries

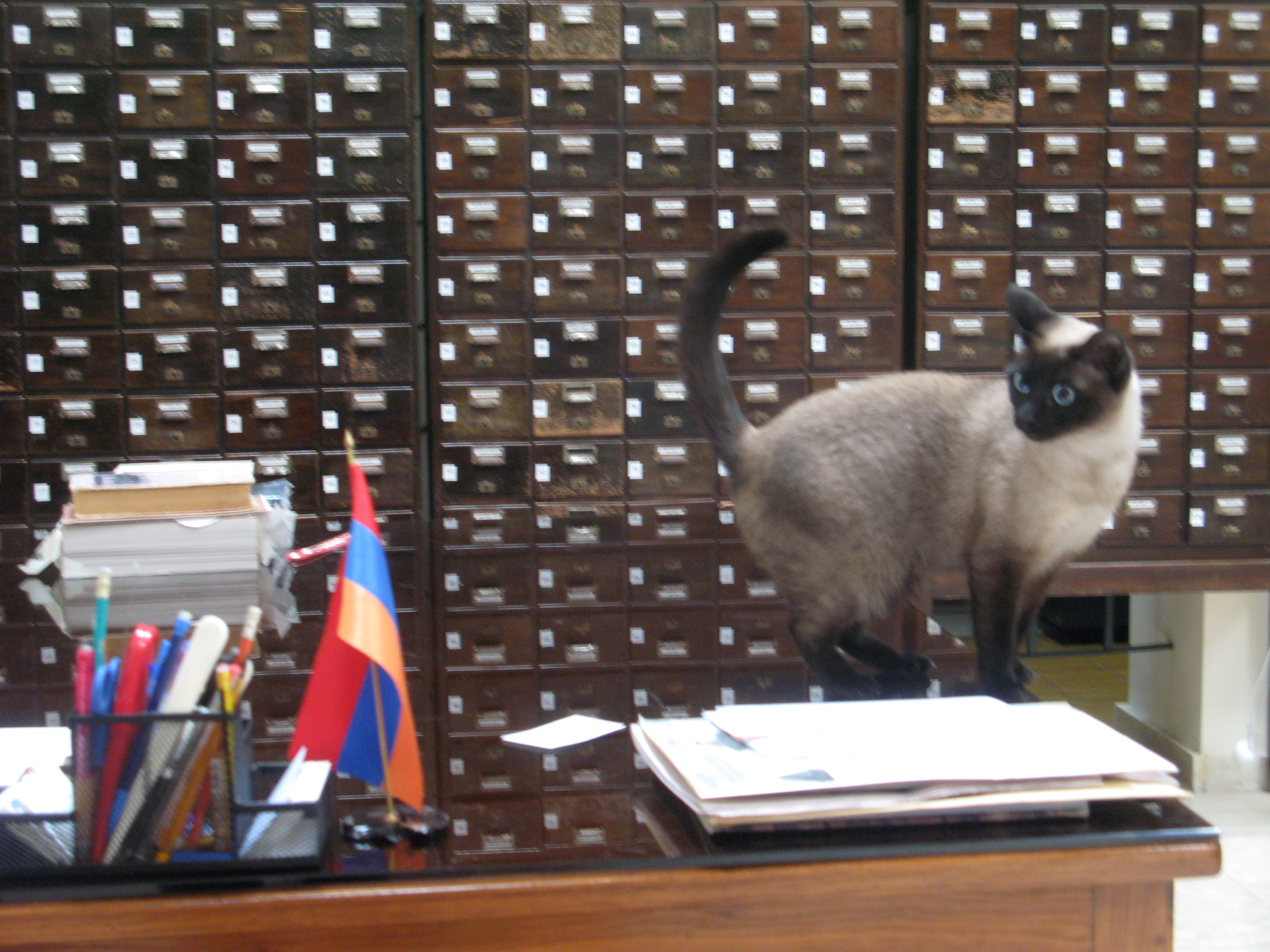
A Siamese library cat

Library cats are domesticated cats that live in public libraries worldwide. The association of cats with libraries dates from at least the Middle Ages up to the present day. Bookstore cats are the same thing in bookstores.

Contemporary library cats have also been featured in film and literature.

== History ==
The relationship between cats and libraries is centuries old. Monastic records from the Middle Ages indicate cats were kept in medieval monasteries in order to control rats that might otherwise eat valuable manuscripts.

== Modern examples ==
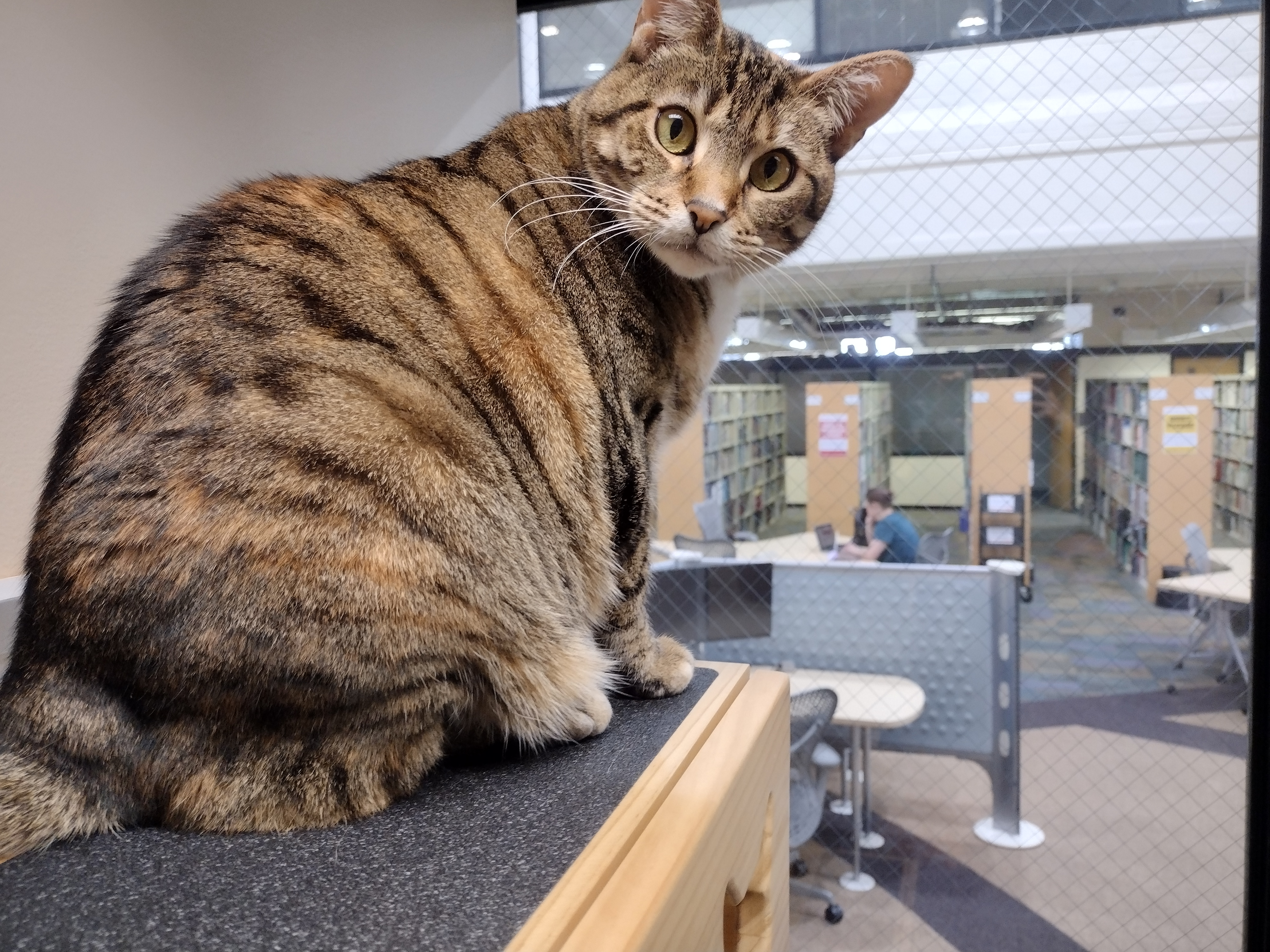
Chickpea, a domestic cat, is a resident of the North Carolina State University's College of Veterinary Medicine's library

In 1745, Russian Empress Elisabeth published an order to transport cats to her court. The descendants of these cats now live in the State Hermitage museum. During the nineteenth century, the British government compensated those libraries that housed cats, on the understanding that they kept rodents away from books.

Library cats have appeared as characters in books and movies, are immortalized in stone in front of their institutions, and some are given positions on the institution's board. Many cats enjoy high-profile professional roles of marketing and public relations.

The relationship between libraries and cats is at times contentious. In one case, there were attempts to remove a cat from a library based on the concerns of patrons with allergies who claimed violations of the Americans with Disabilities Act. Another reason considered was the library cat's reaction to service animals. When a library cat was removed from its institution in Putnam Valley, New York, the institution suffered financially. Two members of the community were so upset about the removal that they deleted from their wills bequests to the library amounting to $80,000.

The Library Cat Society, a now defunct organization, was established in 1987 to encourage the establishment, respect, and recognition of library cats. The society included dozens of member libraries that exchanged information about their cats, and published a newsletter about them.

Phyllis Lahti's anthology Cats, Librarians, and Libraries: Essays for and About the Library Cat Society explored this relationship. The lives of library cats were studied by Gary Roma, a documentarian who produced a film entitled Puss in Books: Adventures of the Library Cat. According to Roma's website, there are more than 800 cataloged library cats worldwide. The catalog indicates that many of them have since died.

Additionally, cats are often found in independent bookstores throughout the United States.

== Benefits ==
Library cats have been used to befriend patrons, boost librarian morale, and inspire reading and literacy programs. Cats can also be useful for marketing campaigns, and are frequently used to generate publicity for their libraries, particularly on social media. The presence of a cat can create a relaxed environment and ease daily stress for patrons and librarians alike, but usually without the typically disruptive loud noises other animals (e.g., dogs) may produce. Cats' generally independent nature may also suit the intellectual environment of a library, as they are low-maintenance and may more readily suit the otherwise preoccupied intellectual personalities who frequent libraries.

== Famous examples ==
Dewey Readmore Books is perhaps the most famous library cat. He lived in Iowa's Spencer Public Library for 19 years. After his death, a book was published about him, and later a few follow-up books.

White Settlement City Council voted to remove library cat Browser from White Settlement Public Library in 2016 but reversed their decision after an international backlash.

Scottish Fold cats Baker and Taylor were mousers for a Nevada library. They were often found sleeping in office supply boxes and dragging shoelaces across rows of books. They became official mascots for the book-distributing brand they were named after.

== See also ==
- Animal-assisted therapy
- Anthrozoology
- Biblioteca Joanina, a library that houses bats for a similar purpose
- Bodega cat
- Ship's cat
