= White Settlement, Texas =

City in Tarrant County, Texas, United States

- City
- City of White Settlement
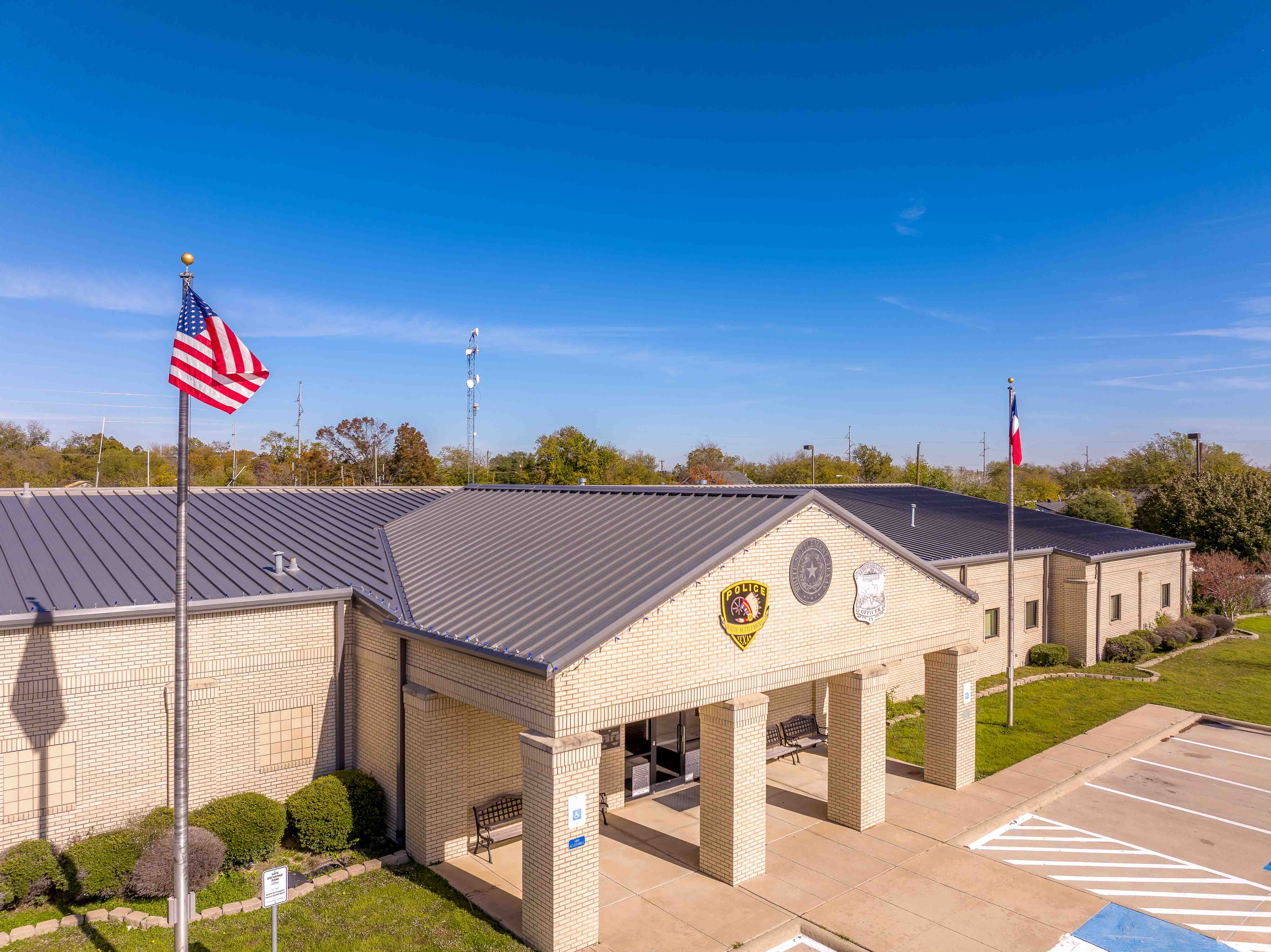
- White Settlement Police Station, November 2023

- Location of White Settlement in Tarrant County, Texas
- Coordinates: 32°45′00″N 97°27′34″W
- Country: United States
- State: Texas
- County: Tarrant
- Named for: The homogeneity of White settlers in an area populated predominantly by American Indian villages during the 1840s

Government
  - Type: Council-manager

Area
  - Total: 5.04 sq mi (13.05 km^{2})
  - Land: 5.04 sq mi (13.05 km^{2})
  - Water: 0.0039 sq mi (0.01 km^{2})
- Elevation: 686 ft (209 m)

Population (2020)
  - Total: 18,269
  - Estimate (2022): 18,046
  - Density: 3,544.0/sq mi (1,368.36/km^{2})
- Time zone: UTC-6 (CST)
  - Summer (DST): UTC-5 (CDT)
- ZIP code: 76108
- Area codes: 817 and 682
- FIPS code: 48-78544
- GNIS feature ID: 2412255
- Website: wstx.us

White Settlement is a city in Tarrant County, Texas, United States, and a northwestern suburb of Fort Worth. Its population was estimated to be 18,084 in 2021. The city is bordered by Lockheed Martin and the Naval Air Station Joint Reserve Base Fort Worth.

Prior to his death, White Settlement Public Library was home to Browser, a cat that gained international attention in 2016, when local politicians sought to oust him from the library over the objections of local residents.

== History ==
Even before the beginnings of a nearby military outpost, Fort Worth, white settlers took up refuge along a creek, later named Farmers Branch Creek. Before the end of 1841, settlers began arriving from Missouri, Illinois, Indiana, Kentucky, and Tennessee. In 1850, the area's first census showed the population consisted of 599 White Americans and 65 Black enslaved people. By the mid-1850s, many more settlers arrived, bringing with them more enslaved people.

The oldest street in White Settlement is White Settlement Road. This original trail led from the fort to the "white settlement" about eight miles west into Native American territory. As the Native Americans were forced from the area, and the settlement moved westward, the road followed. This was the only public road in White Settlement's early history.

While early life was not easy for the settlers, with frequent clashes with indigenous populations, White Settlement became a trading outpost. As the migrating settlers carved out homesteads among the various indigenous tribes, outsiders, and Native Americans referred to the area as "the white settlement."

In February 1942, Consolidated Aircraft Company began construction on the B-24 Liberator heavy bomber at Air Force Plant #4. Liberator Village, as it became known, consisted of housing units across the city to house aircraft workers.

In modern times, the city of White Settlement is the gateway to national defense, bordered by Lockheed Martin and the Naval Air Station Joint Reserve Base Fort Worth. As federal properties, the White Settlement Police Department has concurrent jurisdiction for calls for service and patrols at the military base and aircraft plant.

Two members of the city's West Freeway Church of Christ were killed by a gunman on December 29, 2019, during a morning service. The shooter was, in turn, shot dead by a church security guard.

A recent White Settlement mayor, Ronald White, died in office on January 17, 2023. He was the 19th mayor of the city. Mayor Pro Tem Amber Muñoz took over as the 20th mayor of White Settlement, becoming the first woman to serve as mayor in the city's history. On May 6, 2023, residents elected Faron Young in a special election to fill the office for the remainder of White's term.

== Name ==
The city got its name as it was a lone settlement of White colonists amid several Native American villages in the Fort Worth area in the Texas Republic territory in the 1840s.

On October 14, 2005, city leaders, citing hurdles in attracting businesses, announced a plan to have local voters decide on a possible name change for the town from White Settlement to West Settlement. In the November 8 election, the name change was overwhelmingly rejected by a vote of 2,388 to 219.

== Geography ==
According to the United States Census Bureau, the city has a total area of 5.1 square miles (13.1 km^{2}), all land.

== Demographics ==
Historical population
Census	Pop.	Note	%±
1950	10,827		—
1960	11,513		6.3%
1970	13,449		16.8%
1980	13,508		0.4%
1990	15,472		14.5%
2000	14,831		−4.1%
2010	16,116		8.7%
2020	18,269		13.4%
2022 (est.)	18,046		−1.2%
U.S. Decennial Census

=== 2020 census ===
As of the 2020 census, White Settlement had a population of 18,269. The median age was 35.4 years, 24.5% of residents were under the age of 18, and 14.1% of residents were 65 years of age or older. For every 100 females there were 100.1 males, and for every 100 females age 18 and over there were 99.3 males age 18 and over.

100.0% of residents lived in urban areas, while 0.0% lived in rural areas.

There were 6,875 households, of which 34.4% had children under the age of 18 living in them; 37.9% were married-couple households, 24.4% were households with a male householder and no spouse or partner present, and 30.4% were households with a female householder and no spouse or partner present. About 27.7% of all households were made up of individuals and 10.3% had someone living alone who was 65 years of age or older. There were 4,010 families residing in the city.

There were 7,413 housing units, of which 7.3% were vacant. The homeowner vacancy rate was 1.6% and the rental vacancy rate was 8.6%.

Racial composition as of the 2020 census (NH = Non-Hispanic) (Note: Note: the US Census treats Hispanic/Latino as an ethnic category. This table excludes Latinos from the racial categories and assigns them to a separate category. Hispanics/Latinos can be of any race.)
Race	Number	Percent
White	10,988	60.1%
Black or African American	1,340	7.3%
American Indian and Alaska Native	259	1.4%
Asian	407	2.2%
Native Hawaiian and Other Pacific Islander	69	0.4%
Some other race	2,182	11.9%
Two or more races	3,024	16.6%
Hispanic or Latino (of any race)	5,941	32.5%

== Government and infrastructure ==
The city of White Settlement operates as a city manager form of government overseen by a mayor and city council. a suburb of Fort Worth, it has a full-time police and fire department to ensure public safety.

The police department is overseen by Chief of Police Christopher Cook, previously the chief spokesperson and deputy police chief for the City of Arlington, Texas. The police department provides dispatch services to the cities of Westworth Village and Sansom Park. The department also provides detention services for the cities of Westover Hills, Westworth Village, Sansom Park, White Settlement Independent School District, the United States Marshal's Service, and the Federal Bureau of Investigation. In 2022, the Fort Worth Police Department and Tarrant County Justice of the Precinct 4 Judge Christopher Gregory entered into an interlocal agreement with the White Settlement Police Department to establish and authorize concurrent enforcement jurisdiction.

The Naval Air Station Joint Reserve Base Fort Worth and Air Force Plant #4 have territory in White Settlement. The United States Postal Service operates the White Settlement Post Office. The city is under the jurisdiction of Tarrant County and operates as a council-manager government type.

== Education ==
The City of White Settlement is served by the White Settlement Independent School District. In 2009, the school district was rated "academically acceptable" by the Texas Education Agency.

The White Settlement Public Library is located in the Municipal Complex.

Less than 16% of residents hold a bachelor's degree or higher as opposed to 34% of all Texans.

== See also ==
- List of municipalities in Texas
- Browser, White Settlement Public Library Cat
