= List of Queen Victoria's pets =

Domestic creatures kept by the British monarch

Victoria’s Favourite Pets, painted by Edwin Landseer in 1841, shows the spaniel Dash, Lory the parrot, the greyhound Nero and deerhound Hector.

Wednesday 18 May 1836

Dear Uncle Ernest made me the present of a most delightful Lory, which is so tame, that it remains on your hand, & you may put your finger into its beak, or do any thing with it without its ever attempting to bite. It is larger than Mamma's Grey Parrot, & has a most beautiful plumage; it is scarlet, blue, brown, yellow & purple.

— Queen Victoria's journal (18 May 1836)

Queen Victoria and her close family kept numerous pet animals, including:

- Alma – a possible Thoroughbred
- Bess/Bessie – Born on the 25th of September 1875, Bess is a collie she is daughter of Noble III and Nellie who are also dogs owned by Queen Victoria
- Coco – an African grey parrot, sadly any portraits of coco are hard to find.
- Dandie Dinmont – she is described as scotch terrier at times and others times a Skye Terrier due to the breed being not as well defined, compared to modern period.
- Dash – a King Charles Spaniel
- Dot – a Terrier born July 1872 to Minnia and Princie
- Eos – a greyhound which Prince Albert brought from Germany
- Fern – was a brown and black Border collie sadly passed at age of 12,on 29 June 1886
- Flora – a Highland pony
- Fly – Fox-Terrier
- Goats – Mohammad Shah Qajar, the Shah of Persia, presented Queen Victoria with a pair of Tibetan goats upon her accession to the throne. From these, a royal goat herd was established at Windsor. Goats from this herd were then used as regimental mascots by regiments such as the Royal Welch Fusiliers.
- Hector – a deerhound
- Islay – a Skye terrier. Victoria owned Islay for five years and he died from unknown previously survived a bite from a cat
- Jacquot – a donkey
- Looty – a Pekingese dog taken from the Old Summer Palace during the Second Opium War
- Marco – a small spitz which was the first of her many Pomeranians.
- Minnie – a dog
- Nero – a greyhound
- Nip – a dog
- Noble – the Queen's favourite collie. A statue by Princess Louise is in Osborne House.
- Picco – a Sardinian pony
- Roy – a collie born 1st of June 1873, at the Victoria Bridge in Windsor.
- Sally – a dog
- Sharp – a collie
- Slip – a dog
- Spot – a dog
- Teazer – a dog
- Turi – a Pomeranian who lay on her deathbed at her request
- Wat – a dog
- White Heather – a possibly black and white or as a fully white Persian cat that was owned by the Queen, and possibly inherited by her son King Edward VII after her death in 1901. there is very little is known about white heather aside from somewhat reliable book called Parasites, Pussycats and Psychosis The Unknown Dangers of Human Toxoplasmosis by E. Fuller Torrey aside from that source they are not mentioned in any historical and or educational site to back up the book
- lory – could be a eclectus species or a type of Loriini bird

== See also ==
- Royal corgis
- Horses of Elizabeth II
- Caesar – King Edward VII's pet
- Canadian Parliamentary Cats
- Chief Mouser to the Cabinet Office, United Kingdom
- Tibs the Great
