= Susan (dog) =

Dog owned by Queen Elizabeth II (1944–1959)

- Species: Canis familiaris
- Breed: Pembroke Corgi
- Sex: Female
- Born: 20 February 1944
- Died: 26 January 1959 (aged 14); Sandringham House, Norfolk
- Resting place: Sandringham House, Norfolk; 52°49′47″N 0°30′50″E
- Owner: Queen Elizabeth II
- Offspring: Sugar, Honey

Susan (20 February 1944 – 26 January 1959) was a Pembroke Corgi dog owned by Queen Elizabeth II that was given to her on her eighteenth birthday. Following the dog's death in 1959, the Queen personally designed a headstone for her grave at Sandringham House. Susan was the first of a long line of Corgis and Dorgis (Dachshund/Corgi crosses) owned by the Queen, all of them descended from Susan. The dogs often accompanied the Queen in her public appearances, and thus came to feature prominently in her public image.

== Background ==
King George VI bought his first Pembroke Corgi in 1933 from the Rozavel Kennels in Surrey. Named Dookie, he proved popular with his daughters, Princesses Elizabeth and Margaret, and so a second Corgi, Jane, was purchased. He also owned six other dogs, but it was the Corgis of whom the young Princess Elizabeth was most fond.

== Royal life ==
For her eighteenth birthday in 1944, the King gave Princess Elizabeth a two-month-old Pembroke Corgi puppy with the registered name Hickathrift Pippa; she was called Sue, which became Susan.

Princess Elizabeth did not want to be separated from Susan, so following her wedding to Philip, Duke of Edinburgh, at Westminster Abbey in 1947, Susan was hidden under rugs as the Princess and the Duke of Edinburgh travelled through London in an open carriage on the way to their honeymoon. She then accompanied the couple on their travels, including on a tour of Lord Mountbatten's Broadlands estate in a Jeep driven by Prince Philip.

In early 1959, Susan caused a stir when she bit a policeman who was patrolling Buckingham Palace. It was the fourth time she had bitten someone at the palace. On the previous occasions it had been a sentry, a detective, and the royal clock winder.

By her first mating, with Lucky Strike of the Rozavel kennel, Susan was the mother of Sugar (officially Prince Charles' dog) and Honey, who became the Queen Mother's favourite. She was later bred with a Rozavel dog named Rebellion; the Queen kept two puppies from that litter.

== Death and legacy ==
Following Susan's death at Sandringham House on 26 January 1959, she was buried in the pet cemetery that Queen Victoria had founded there. The Queen drew up plans for a gravestone, sending a sketch, along with an initial inscription, to Robert Marrington, who dealt with the works on the Crown Estate. The initial inscription on the gravestone was to read "Susan / died 26 Jan 1959 / for 15 years the faithful companion of the Queen." However, after some further research by the Queen revealed Susan's date of birth, she suggested on 4 February 1959 that the date of birth be inserted into the inscription. On 18 February, she sent through a further revision to the inscription, requesting that it be changed to "almost 15 years" for the sake of accuracy. The sketches were to be sold at auction in 2004, but the Royal Household stepped in and prevented the sale. Her descendants Sugar, Heather and Pharos were later buried near her.

Susan was the progenitor of the Queen's line of Corgis and Dorgis. In 2009, the Queen decided to stop breeding her dogs following the deaths of two favourites to cancer. During the course of her life, the Queen owned more than thirty of Susan's descendants; Holly and Willow, as of July 2015 the latest of the Queen's dogs, were probably the fourteenth generation descended from her. The queen did not have any full-bred corgis after Willow died in April 2018. One of two remaining corgis, Vulcan, died in 2020, leaving one, Candy, still living as of December 2020. Candy was joined by another corgi pup named Fergus and a corgi pup named Muick in 2021.

== See also ==
- Caesar (dog) – a Wire Fox Terrier owned by King Edward VII
- Dash (spaniel) – a King Charles Spaniel owned by Queen Victoria
- Royal corgis
- List of individual dogs
