= Dash (spaniel) =

King Charles Spaniel owned by Queen Victoria

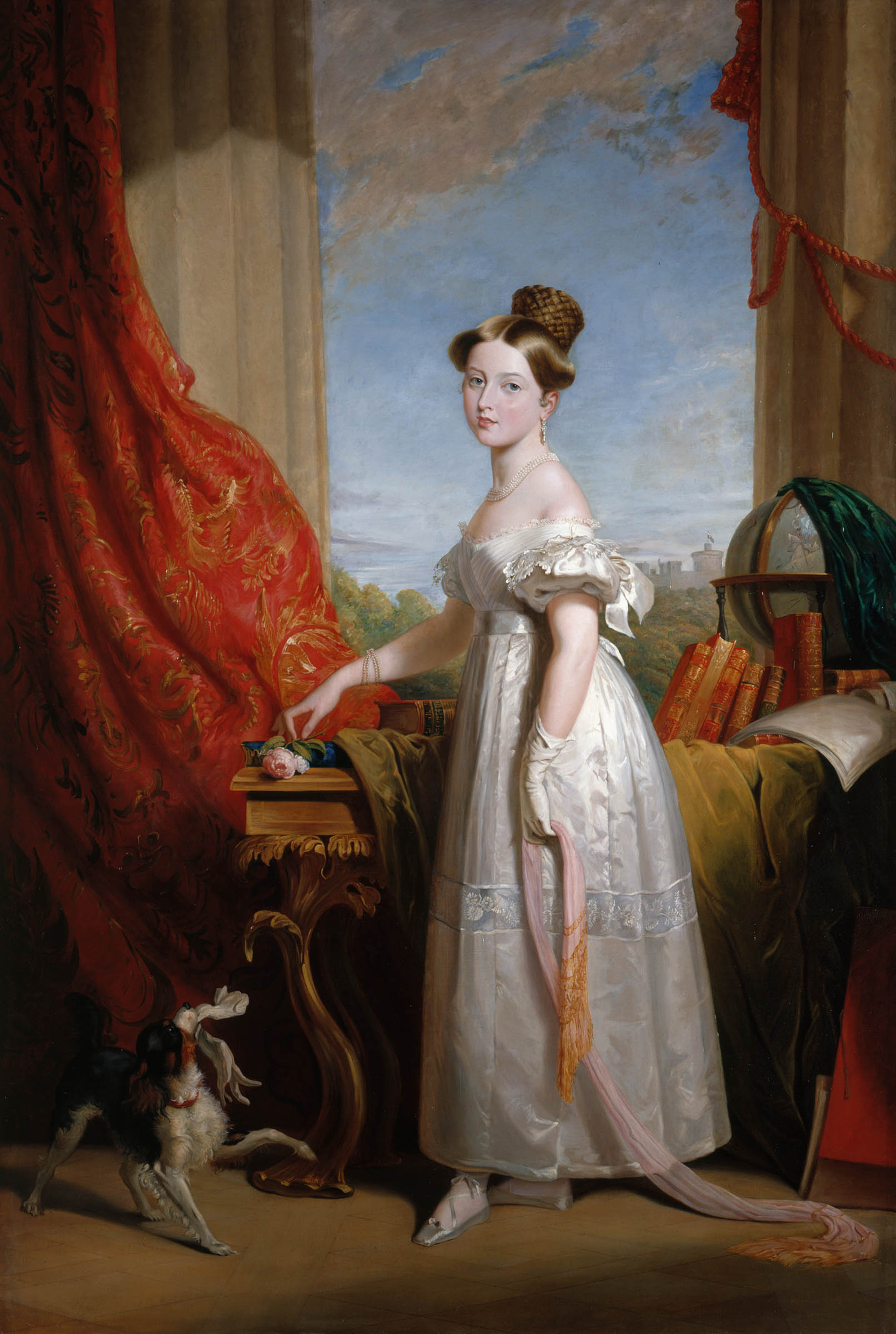
- Dash with Princess Victoria, by Sir George Hayter, 1833
- Species: Canis familiaris
- Breed: King Charles Spaniel
- Sex: Male
- Born: 1830
- Died: 24 December 1840
- Resting place: Adelaide Cottage, Windsor, Berkshire, England
- Owner: Queen Victoria

Dash (1830–1840) was a King Charles Spaniel owned by Queen Victoria. Victoria's biographer Elizabeth Longford, called him "the Queen's closest childhood companion", and in the words of the Oxford Dictionary of National Biography, he "was the first in a long line of beloved little dogs".

== Biography ==
He was given to Victoria's mother, the Duchess of Kent, on 14 January 1833 by Sir John Conroy, the Comptroller of the Duchess's household. By the end of April 1833, he had become Victoria's companion, and by Christmas that year she was doting on him, giving him a set of rubber balls and two pieces of gingerbread as presents. In return, the dog was loyal to Victoria; on one occasion she went sailing on a yacht, and Dash leapt from the coastline into the sea and swam after her.

Victoria, who was 13 when given Dash, had few if any childhood friends as she was raised largely isolated from other children under the so-called "Kensington System", an elaborate set of rules and protocols devised by the Duchess and Conroy. The only girl of a similar age with whom she had regular contact was Conroy's youngest daughter, Victoire, but they seemed to have had only a formal acquaintanceship. In her diary, Victoria refers to Victoire as "Miss Conroy" but the dog is showered with endearments: "dear sweet little Dash" and "dear Dashy".

In November 1834, Victoria and her mother took a holiday at St Leonards-on-Sea. They, with Dash, Lady Flora Hastings and Baroness Louise Lehzen, were driving in a landau drawn by two horses when the horses got caught in the traces and fell. With the horses struggling on the ground, there was a danger the carriage would overturn, injuring the women. Victoria scrambled out with Dash in her arms, and, as she recalled, "ran on with him in my arms calling Mama to follow, Lehzen and Lady Flora followed us also." While two passing gentlemen cut the horses free, the ladies, and Dash, took shelter behind a wall.

Dash remained with Victoria after her accession as queen in 1837. Following her coronation on 28 June 1838, Victoria returned to Buckingham Palace and ran up to her rooms to give Dash his usual bath.

== Death ==
Dash (left) with Lory (parrot), Nero (greyhound) and Hector (Scottish deerhound) by Edwin Henry Landseer, 1838

Dash died in late 1840. Victoria wrote in her journal that on 24 December 1840, Prince Albert informed her of Dash's death, writing that hearing the news "grieved me so. I was so fond of the poor little fellow, & he was so attached to me." He was buried at Adelaide Cottage in Windsor Home Park. A marble effigy was erected over the grave, bearing the inscription:

Here lies
DASH
The favourite spaniel of Her Majesty Queen Victoria
In his 10th year
His attachment was without selfishness
His playfulness without malice
His fidelity without deceit
READER
If you would be beloved and die regretted
Profit by the example of
DASH

== See also ==
- Caesar (dog), terrier owned by King Edward VII
- Queen Victoria's pets
- Susan (dog), progenitor of the long line of Pembroke Corgis owned by Queen Elizabeth II
- List of individual dogs
