= Dookie (dog) =

Dog belonging to the British royal family

- Other name: Dookie
- Species: Canis familiaris
- Breed: Pembroke Welsh Corgi
- Sex: Male
- Born: Rozavel Golden Eagle; 1933; Surrey, England
- Owner: King George VI
- Parents: Ch. Crymmych President (sire); Ch. Golden Girl (dam)

Dookie (1933 – ?) or Rozavel Golden Eagle was a Pembroke Welsh Corgi bought in 1933 by King George VI then Prince Albert, Duke of York. Dookie was the first Pembroke Welsh Corgi to join the Royal Family. The dog was especially popular with Elizabeth II, who named Dookie in honor of her father the Duke of York.

== Background ==
George VI then Prince Albert, Duke of York decided to purchase a Pembroke Welsh Corgi for his daughters Princesses Elizabeth and Margaret after the girls had fallen in love with the breed when visiting the Pembroke Welsh Corgis owned by the children of the Marquess of Bath. In July 1933 Thelma Gray of Rozavel Kennels brought three Pembroke Welsh Corgi puppies for the family to choose from to their home at 145 Piccadilly. Out of the three, Dookie was chosen because of his slightly longer tail, the children's mother, the then Duchess of York, having remarked that a dog should have something to wag "so that we can see whether he is pleased or not."

Dookie was born "Rozavel Golden Eagle" in 1933 and bred by Thelma Gray at the Rozavel Kennels in Surrey. The bright red pup was sired by Ch. Crymmych President and Ch. Golden Girl.

== Royal life ==
Dookie became a loved member of the family and was described as "unquestionably the character of the Princesses’ delightful canine family" and "a born sentimentalist." The princesses even fed the dog by hand.

Three years later another Pembroke Welsh Corgi named Rozavel Lady Jane was purchased to be the companion of Dookie. Her father was also Crymmych President of Rozavel Kennels. However, Dookie was her brother so Lady Jane was paired with Rozavel Tafferteffy. Jane and Tafferteffy produced two pups named Carol and Crackers. Crackers became a constant companion of Queen Elizabeth The Queen Mother and even retired with her to the Castle of Mey in Scotland.

== See also ==
- Royal corgis
- Susan (dog)
- List of individual dogs
- Canadian Parliamentary Cats
- Chief Mouser to the Cabinet Office, United Kingdom
- Hermitage cats in Saint Petersburg, Russia
- Pets of Vladimir Putin
- Tibs the Great
- Cats of the President of Taiwan
- United States presidential pets
- Pets of British royalty
- Pets in the United Kingdom
