= Ebenezer Cottage =

Coordinates: 53.5904°N 2.1249°W

Ebenezer Cottage, also known as The Shell House, was a domestic residence on Broad Lane in Rochdale, historically in Lancashire, now within Greater Manchester, England. In 1936, its owner, retired mill operator John Halstead, began decorating the building's exterior with various small items, including shells, bottles, teapots, broken tiles, picture frames, ornaments and other bric-à-brac. It became something of a local landmark, but after Halstead's death in 1940, the new owners of the property restored the house to its original façade.
