= Dookie (disambiguation) =

Dookie is the third studio album and the major label debut by American rock band Green Day.

Dookie may also refer to:

- Dookie (dog), a Pembroke Welsh Corgi bought in 1933 by King George VI
- Dookie (poker variation)
- Dookie, Victoria, Australia
  - Dookie United Football Club, an Australian rules football club based in Dookie, Victoria, Australia
- Dookie, the library of agricultural and veterinary sciences at University of Melbourne
- Dookie or dukey, a U.S. slang term for defecation or feces
