= Staffordshire dog figurine =

Matching pottery pieces

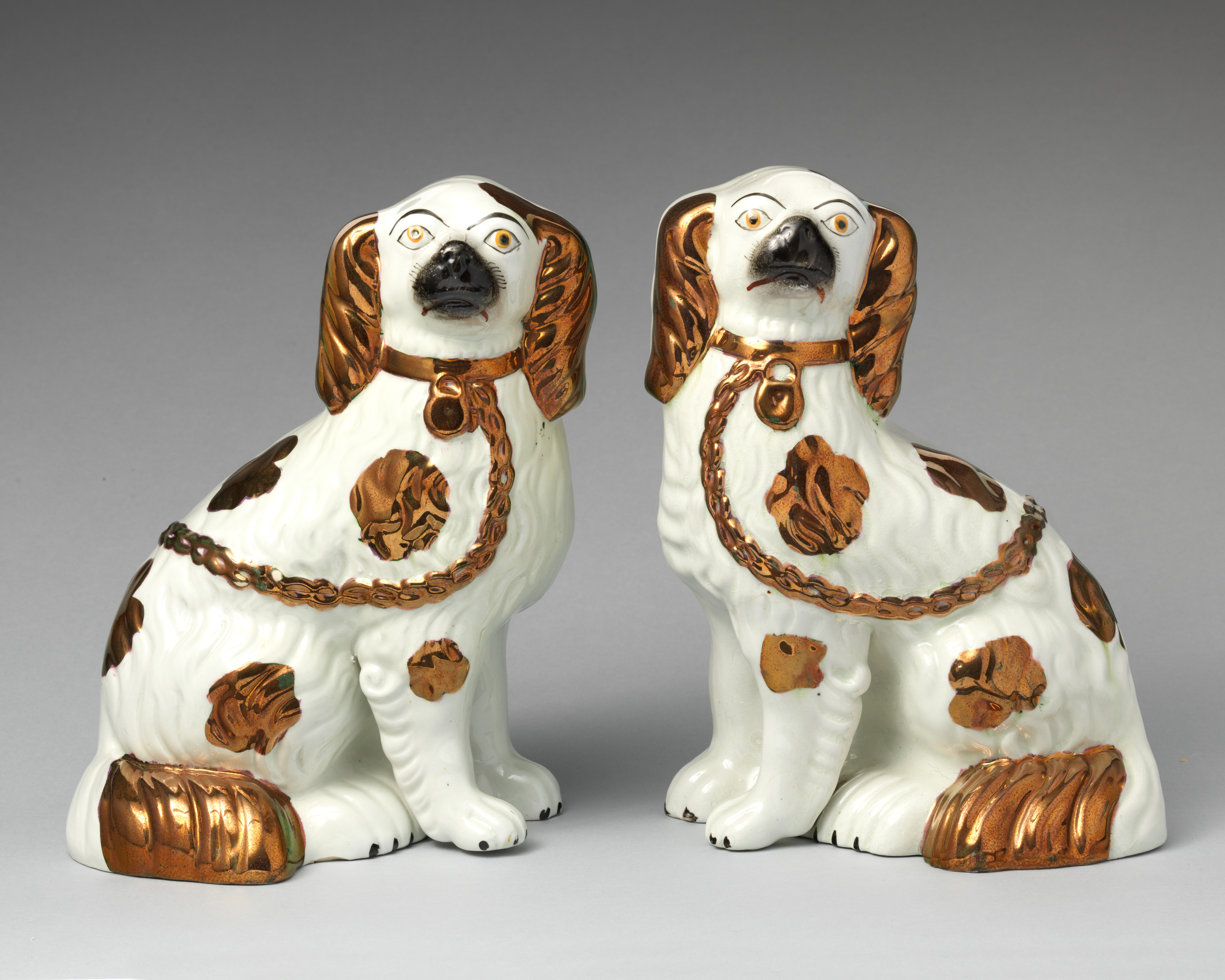
Pair of spaniels, 1830–50; these have gold lustreware

Staffordshire dog figurines are matching pairs of pottery spaniel dogs, standing guard, which were habitually placed on mantelpieces in 19th-century homes. Mainly manufactured in Staffordshire pottery, these earthenware figures were also made in other English counties and in Scotland. They are also known as hearth spaniels or fireplace dogs as they were positioned on top of the mantelpiece. Many other breeds were produced, particularly the greyhound, though the spaniels were especially popular and this is attributed to royalty favouring the King Charles Spaniel breed. In Scotland, they were colloquially termed Wally dugs (Note: Wally dugs with the A pronounced as in wag the tail. As opposed to Ward, Wally dogs or Wallee dogs are all used, the spelling being variable.) and were manufactured in bulk at potteries in places such as Pollokshaws in Glasgow and Portobello near Edinburgh.

Though the most popular, the dogs were only one of many types of Staffordshire figures; other animals and human figures of various kinds were also popular.

== Dog figurines ==
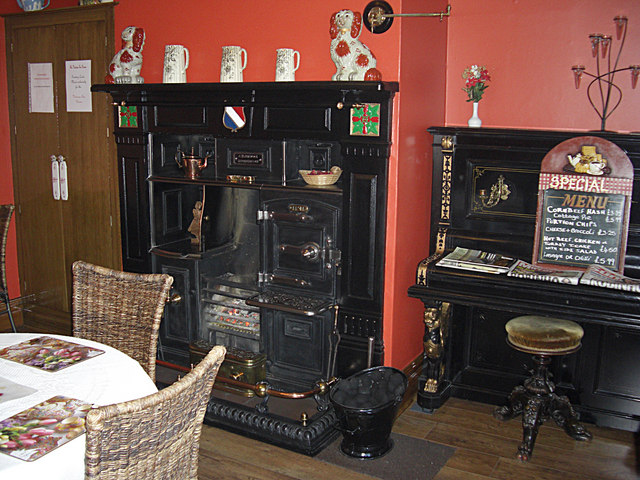
Dog figurines on the mantelpiece

The spaniels were seated in pairs, decorated with a gold chain and locket, and with a creamy white base coat. The Staffordshire spaniel was the quintessential Victorian bourgeois status-symbol ornament: no mantelpiece was complete without a pair of spaniels standing guard. Staffordshire dogs were also placed on the window sill. Staffordshire dogs are nowadays collector's items. Since the 1720s, spaniels had been produced by pottery factories in Staffordshire. The quality of the modeling and painting of the Staffordshire dogs may differ. As the popularity of the figurines increased towards the end of the 19th century, the quality began to decline. Thousands were manufactured but originals in good condition and in their correct pairs are now uncommon. The figures continued to be made until the 1920s and early models are of the better quality. However, reproductions were still being manufactured in 2009.

The spaniels come in sizes from a little over a foot to a few inches high. They were all decorated by hand, which is why all figurines are different and unique. The Staffordshire mantel dog's expression can be soft or fierce, deplorable or self-satisfied, inquisitive or pleased. The base coat is layered over with polka dots or brushed patches of rust, copper luster, or black. Disraeli spaniels feature painted curls on their foreheads; Jackson spaniels are entirely black. Some have glass eyes, some painted. The most frequent model features front legs moulded to the body; rarer models have one or two distinct front legs.

A less common group of dog figurines do have utilitarian purposes, serving also as spill vases, ring holders, banks, and jars. The mantelpiece figures came to be made in varying sizes, sometimes numbered 1 to 6 underneath, encouraging buyers to get sets ranked by size.

Children as young as seven or eight years were paid two shillings a week to paint the gold chains often included on the spaniels in the 1800s.

Spaniel figures continue to be made. In the United States, the 1952 Supreme Court case F. W. Woolworth Co. v. Contemporary Arts, Inc. concerned copyright infringement regarding the design for a Cocker Spaniel figure.

Similar dog figures were made elsewhere - the early Staffordshire examples often imitated types they knew from Chinese export porcelain, and the Staffordshire types were exported to and eventually imitated by other English-speaking markets. But the mantelpiece pair as an iconic feature remained a British phenomenon.

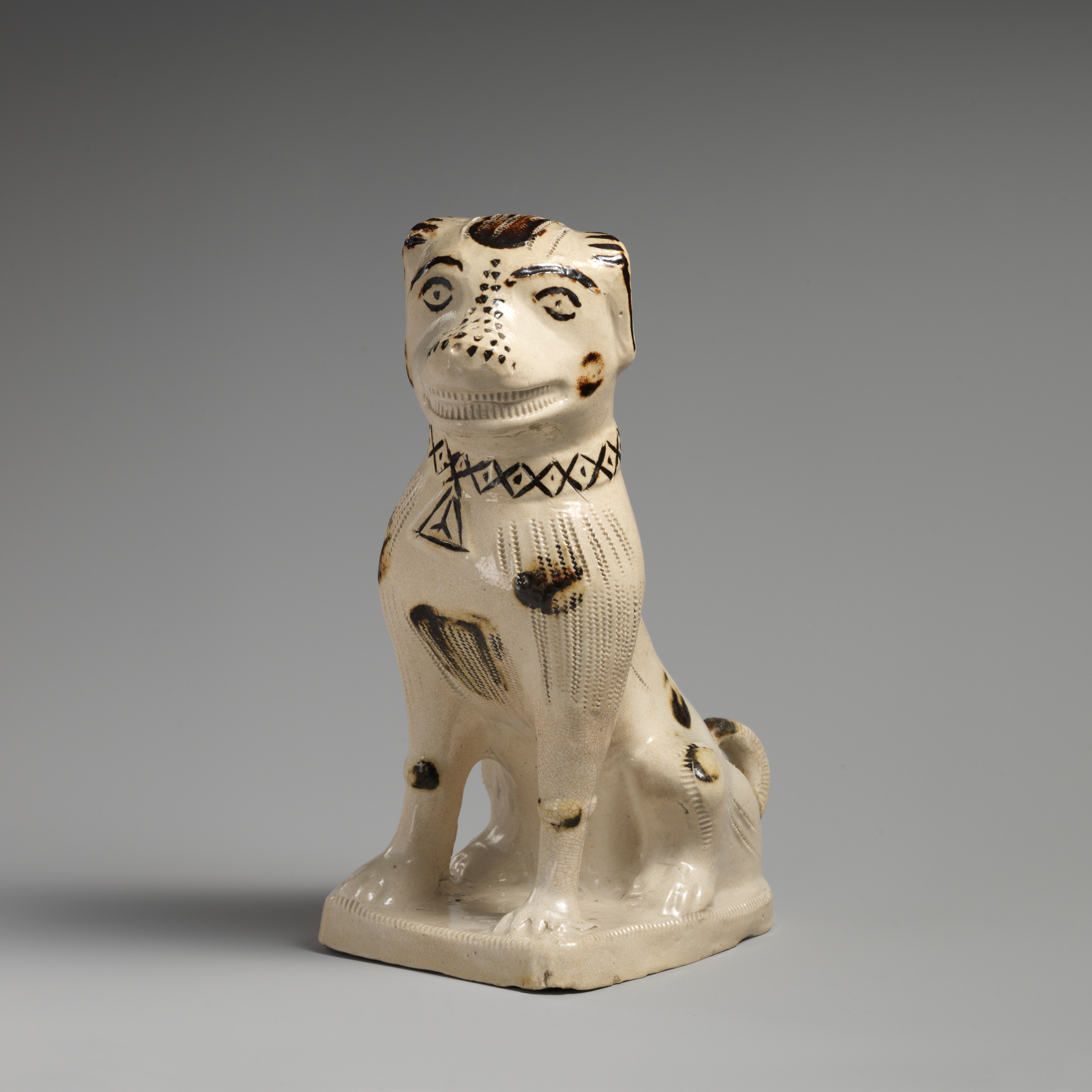
Very early dog, c. 1745, salt-glazed stoneware, c. 8.5 inches tall

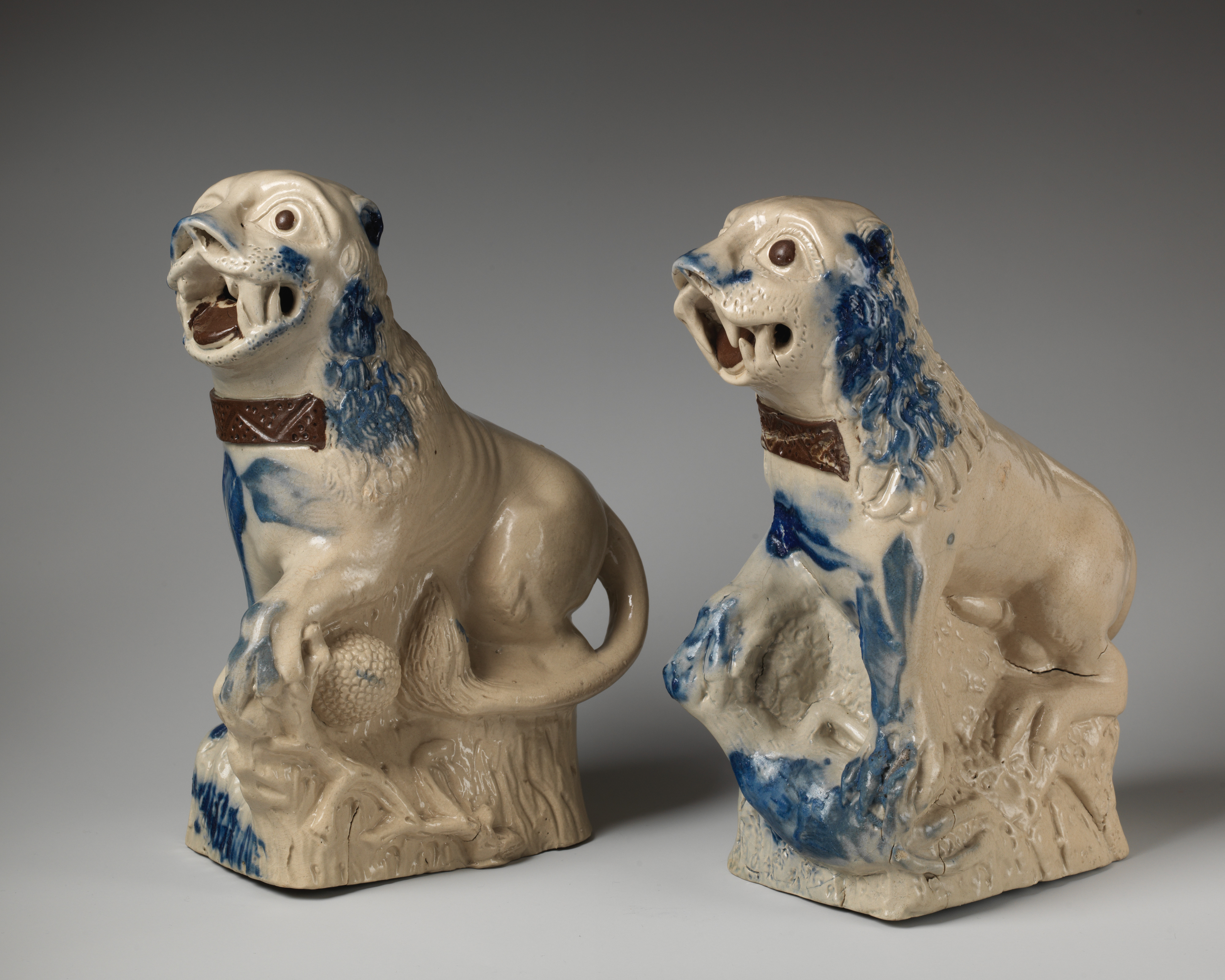
Early pair, c. 1750, copying Chinese figures. salt-glazed stoneware, c. 8.5 inches tall

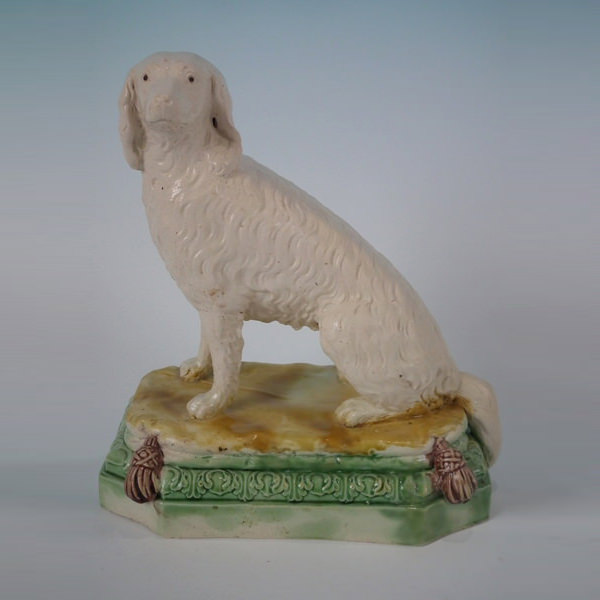
Creamware, c. 1780

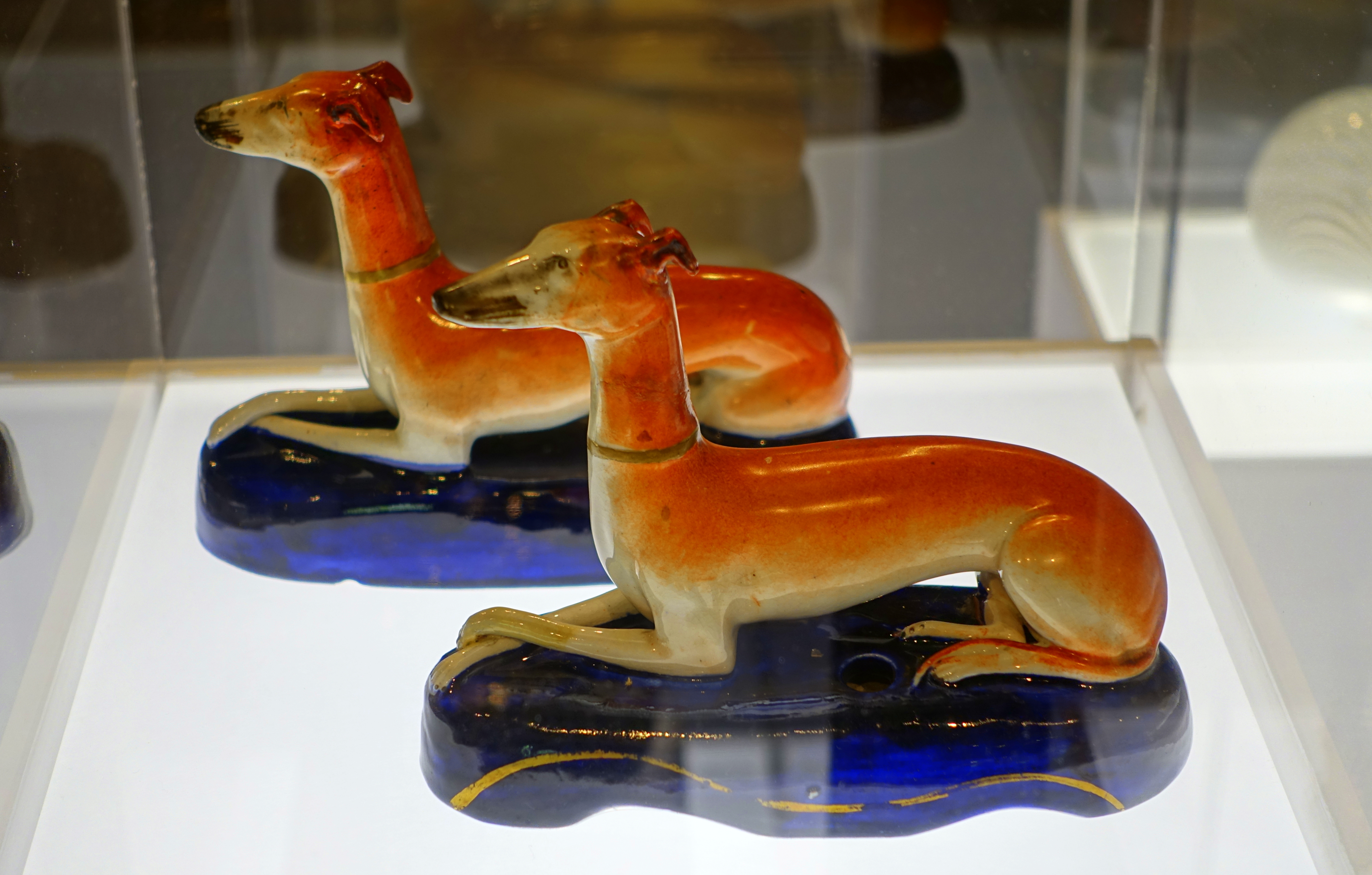
Greyhound pen-holders, c. 1825-1840

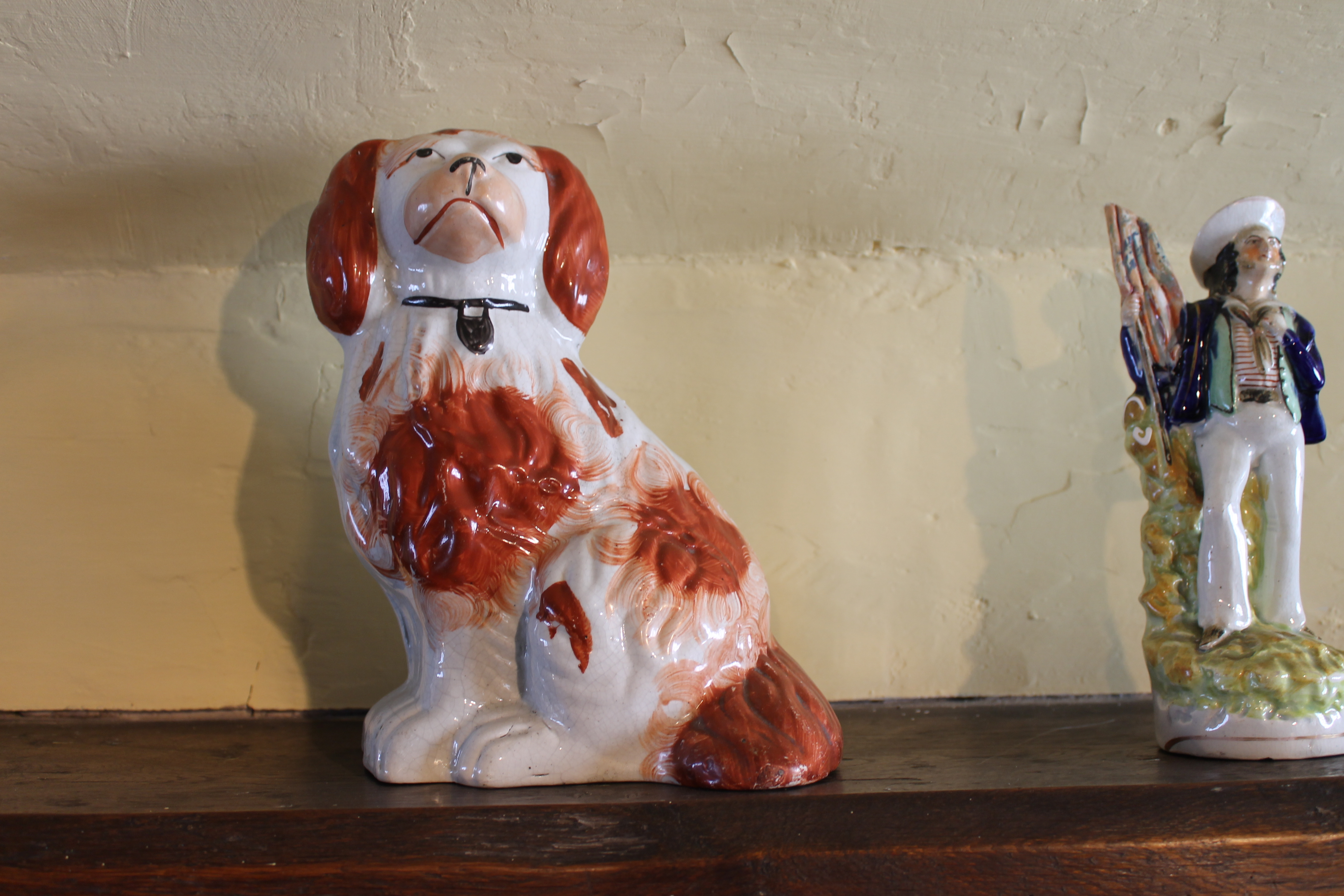
On a mantelpiece

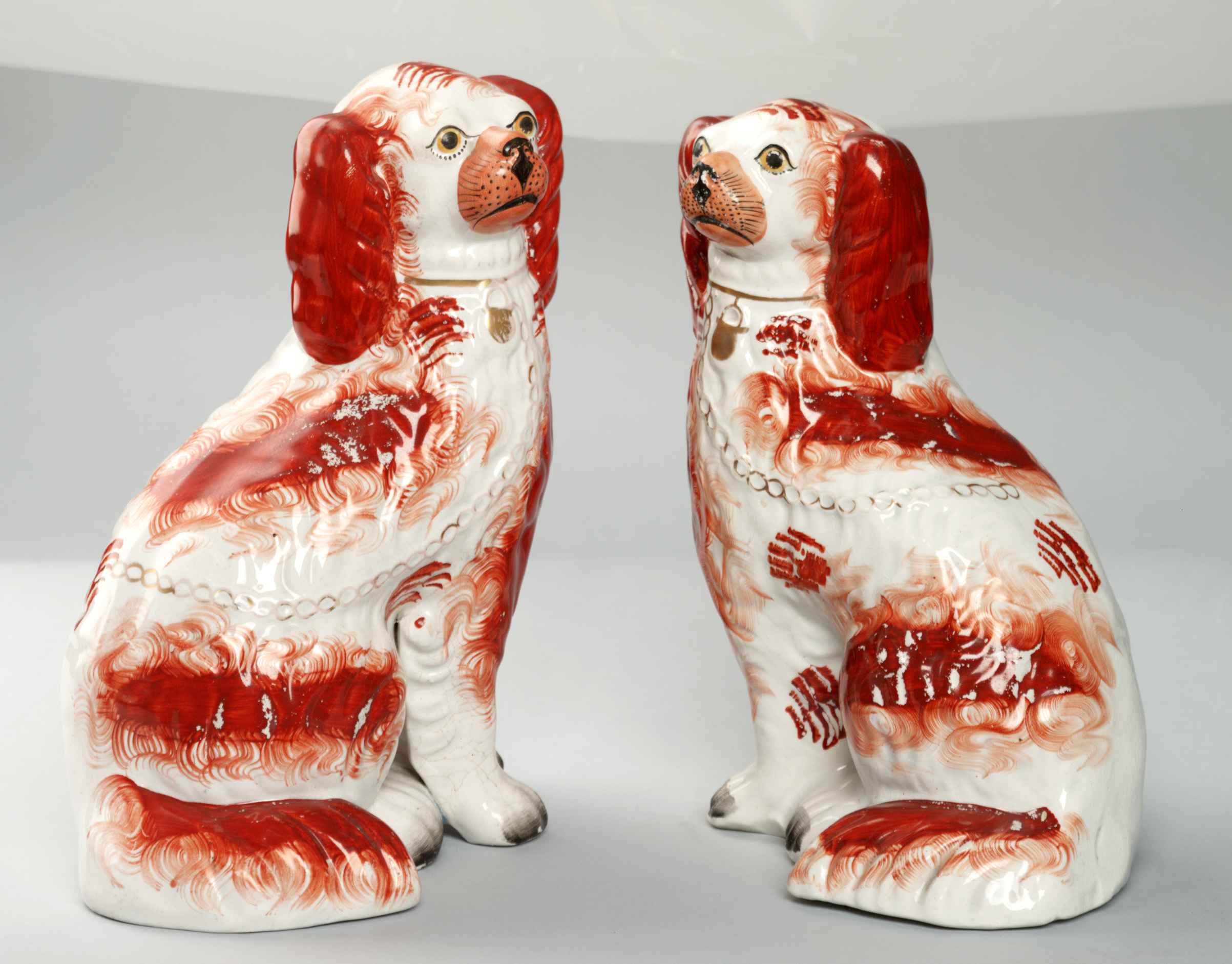

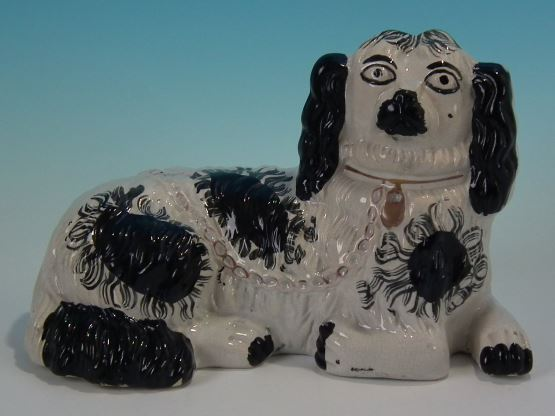
Less common recumbent figure, c. 1860

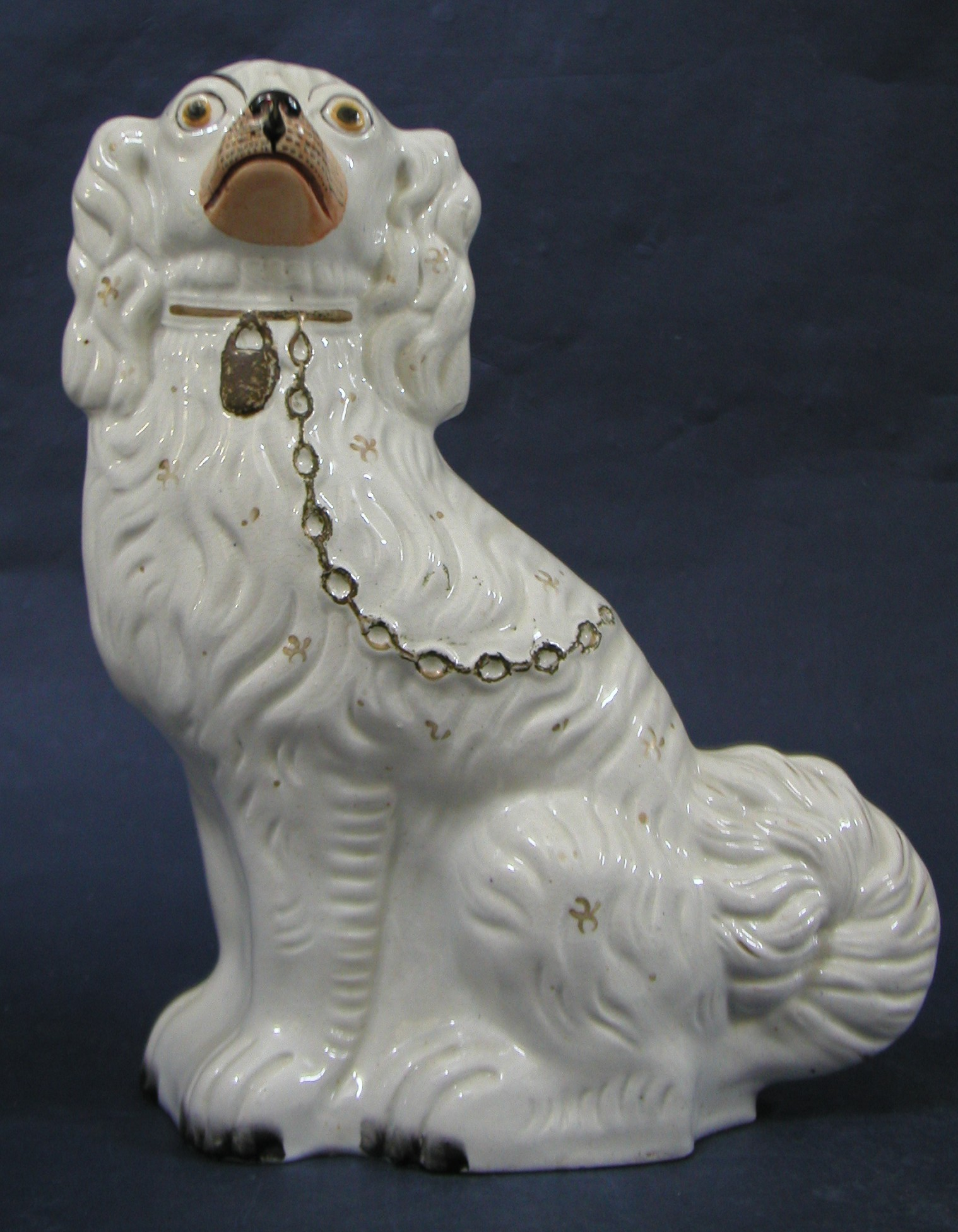
Before 1923, with gold chain.

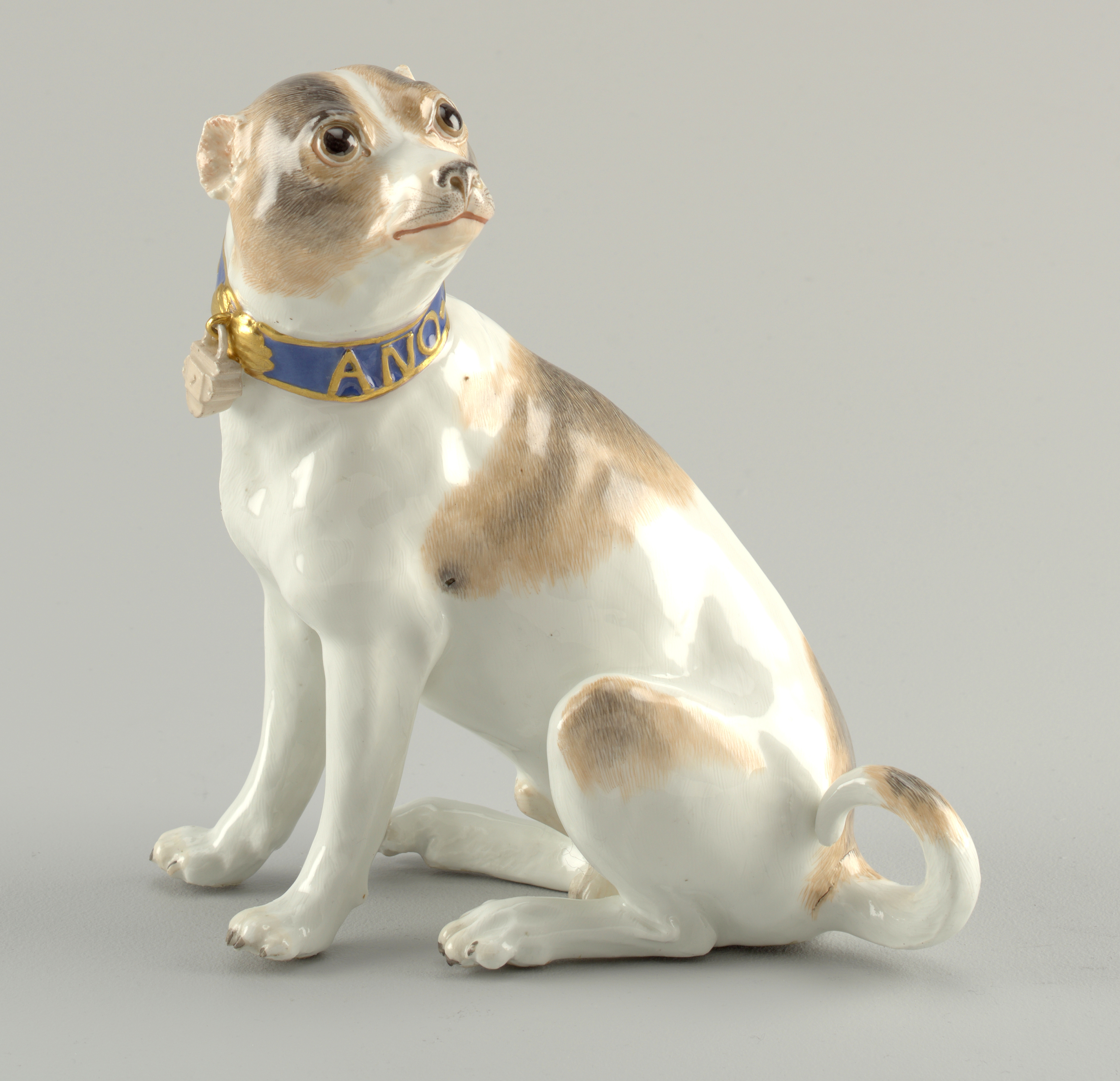
German Meissen porcelain dog, 1741

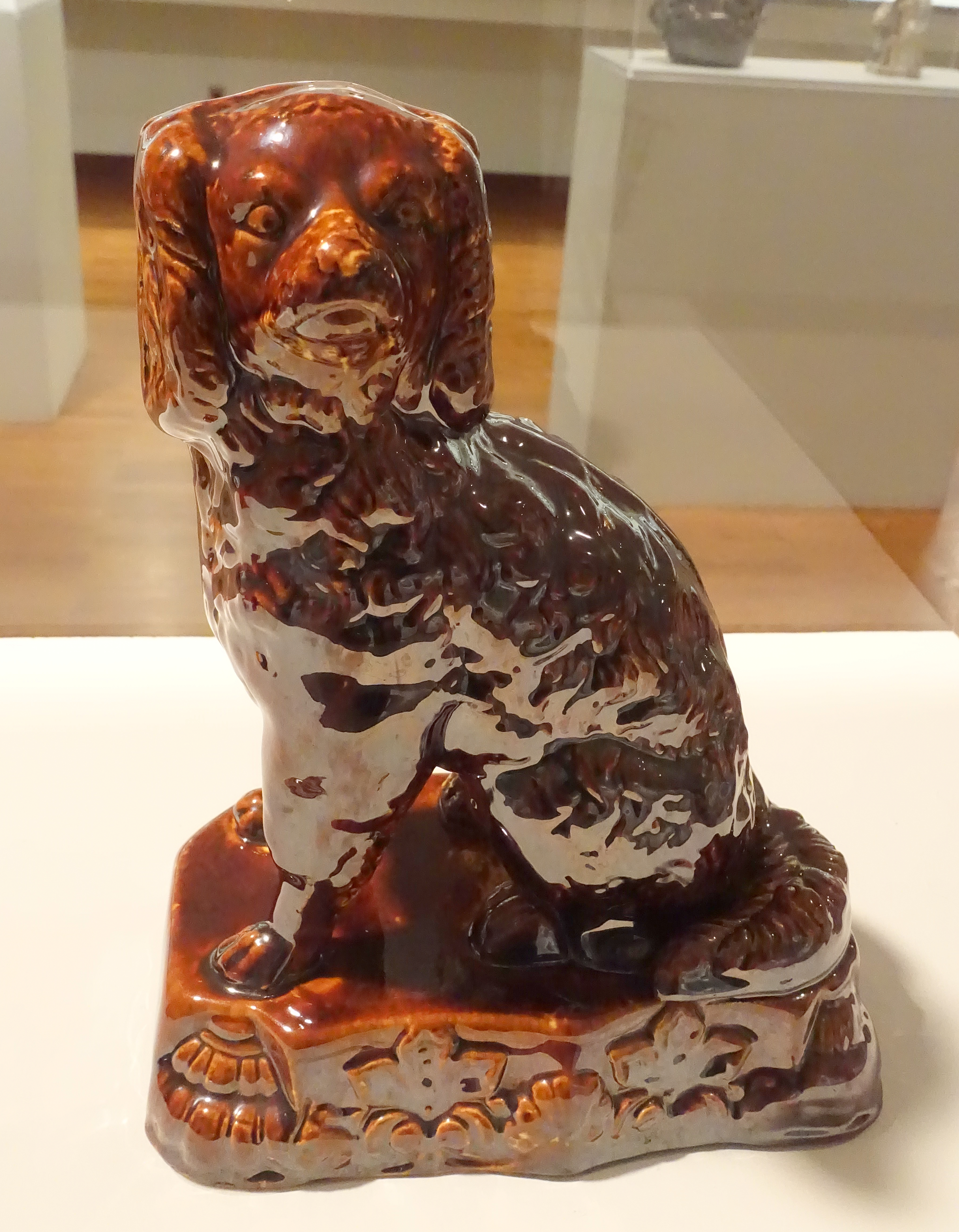
American spaniel, Rockingham Pottery, Bennington, Vermont, 1850-1900

== King Charles Spaniel ==
Dash (left) with Lory (parrot), Nero (greyhound) and Hector (Scottish deerhound), by Edwin Henry Landseer, 1838

The Staffordshire spaniel is tied to the history of the King Charles Spaniel. These spaniels became great favourites of the British monarchs. King Charles I (1600–1649) had a spaniel as a young boy. Owing to Queen Victoria’s spaniel Dash (1830-40), however, the spaniel model enjoyed a surge in popularity in the 1840s which lasted through her reign. Not all dog models were based solely on the spaniel. You can also find other Staffordshire dog breeds, such as pugs, afghans, greyhounds, collies, poodles, and Dalmatians.

== Common names ==
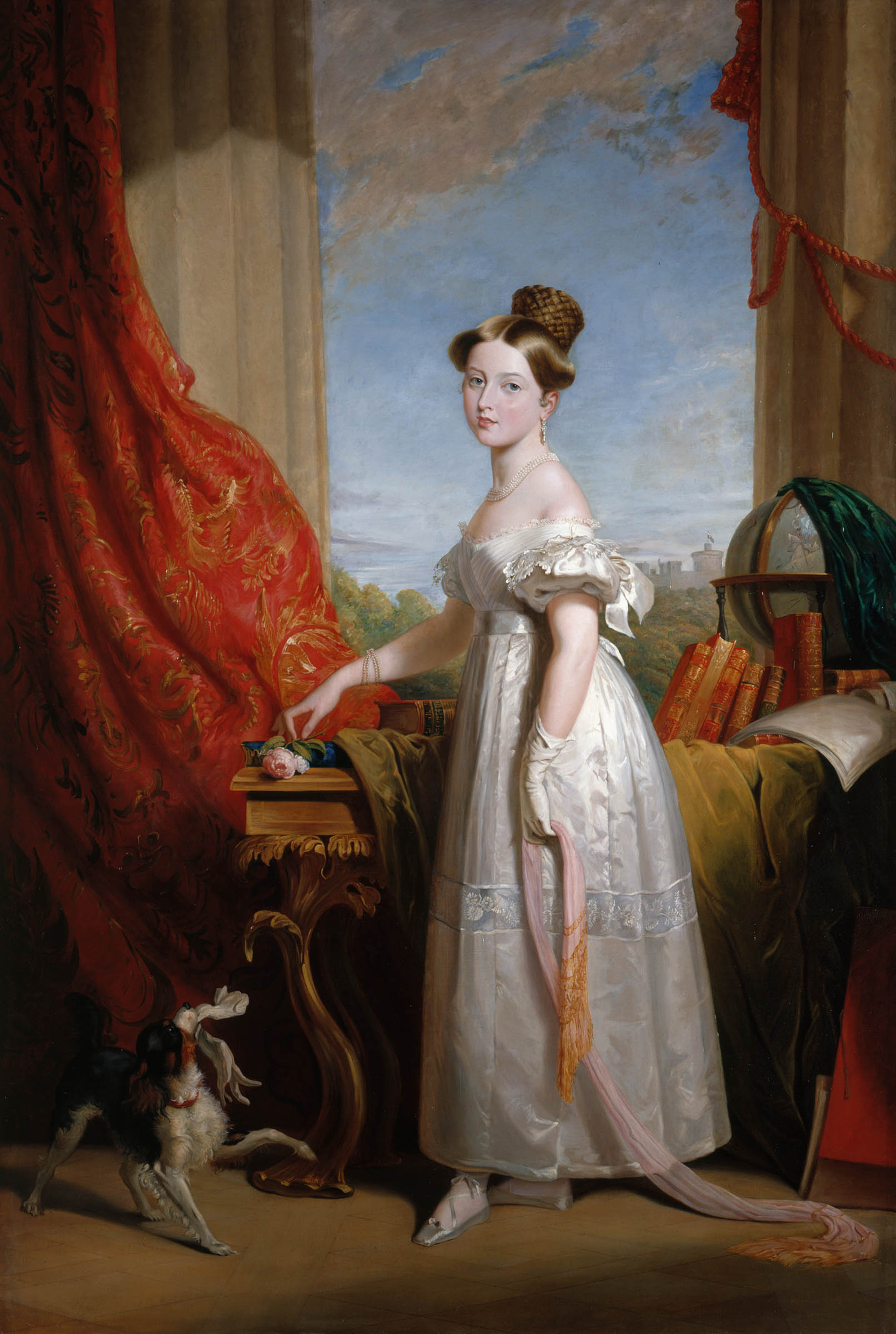
Victoria with her spaniel Dash, 1833, painting by George Hayter

"Wally dugs" (china dogs) have been mentioned in Scottish poetry, including "The Queen of Sheba" by Kathleen Jamie and in a poem describing life in a Glasgow tenement.

There is a popular Scottish poem by an unknown author dedicated to "The Wally Dug". It reads: (Note: The meanings of some of the less common Scots words are: aye-always; brae-hill; lum-chimney; reekin'-smoking; stray-straw; ee-eye; lug-ear; delf-earthenware; gied-gave; moo'-mouth; broo'-brow; fun'-found.)

I aye mind o' that wee hoose that stood on the brae,
Its lum was aye reekin', its roof made o' stray.
The outside was bonny, the inside was snug,
But whit I mind best o' was the wee wally dug.
It stood in a corner, high up on the shelf,
And keepit an ee on the best o' the delf.
It was washed twice a year, frae its tail tae its lug,
And pit back on the shelf, was the wee wally dug.
When oor John got mairrit tae sweet Jeannie Blue,
The auld folks they gied him a horse an' a coo,
But when I left the hoose, ma hert gied a tug,
For a' mither gied me was the wee wally dug.
There's an auld saying, 'Ne'er look a gift horse in the moo',
But I looked that wee dug frae its tail tae its broo'
An' a fun' a wee slit at the back o' its lug,
It was stuffed fu' o' notes, was the wee wally dug.
I tain it hame tae oor Lizzle tae pit on a shelf,
An' I telt her the worth o' that wee bit o' delf.
An' we aye feed it yet through that hole in its lug,
It's a guid bit o' stuff, is the wee wally dug.

The figures are also referred to as “comforters”; this is reputed to be because they could be bought outside of premises selling alcohol by husbands hoping to gain “comfort rather than conflict” from their wives.

Staffordshire dogs were described by writer Teleri Lloyd-Jones as "ornamental clichés" and depictions of the dogs have been incorporated in designs on bags and cushions.

Enid Marx’s still life painting "Still life with Staffordshire Dog and tulips" was motivated by her white Staffordshire Wally Dug. Various examples of Staffordshire dog figurines were included in the Marx-Lambert collection, which was put on display at Compton Verney House in 2004.

== Victorian fairy tale ==
There are various tales said to portray the usefulness of placing the Staffordshire spaniel figurines on window sills. One story is that a woman could place the ornaments in her front window; if the spaniels were turned back to back, it meant her husband was at home. If he was away or at sea, the dogs would be placed facing each other. When her lover passed the house, he would then know by the way the dogs were facing, whether it was safe for him to visit her without her husband knowing. This story is also re-capped in the Baltic.
