= Reuben Ward Binks =

English painter

Reuben Ward Binks (1880, Bolton, Lancashire – 17 May 1950, Westmorland) was an English artist in canine portraiture, Lakeland landscapes and wildlife painting.

== Life and career ==
Binks was recognised as the leading artist of his day in canine portraiture, not only in the UK but abroad. He painted dogs for three generations of the British Royal family, and among his patrons were four successive monarchs.

He spent many months in the Punjab, painting for an Indian potentate, the Maharaja Bhupinder Singh, the ruling Maharaja of the princely state of Patiala from 1900 to 1938) and he paid several visits to the USA to fulfil commissions for prominent American families, including Geraldine R. Dodge, niece of the famous millionaire, John D. Rockefeller.

Starting as a miniaturist, he painted some examples of that art, but had to give it up owing to the strain on his eyes and took to painting sporting subjects. A great lover of dogs, they featured in many of his pictures and it was soon apparent that he had a distinct flair in that direction.

He used a variety of media – drypoint, etching, aquatint, pastel and watercolour – and, as his skill developed, so did his reputation.

His talent attracting Royal notice, Binks was commissioned to paint the famous terrier, “Caesar” Caesar (dog), for King Edward VII and some of the favourite dogs of Queen Alexandra. He also painted Clumber spaniels for King George V, Cairns for King Edward VIII (then Prince of Wales), retrievers for King George VI (then the Duke of York), terriers for the Duke of Gloucester (then Prince Henry), Alsatians for the late Duke of Kent (then Prince George), and the pets of Princess Victoria (sister of King George V).

During the reign of King George V, Binks was frequently asked to attend the Royal shoots at Sandringham in order to sketch the sporting dogs at work. Among his most treasured possessions was a signed portrait of His Majesty given to him by the King in 1929, framed in red morocco and bearing the Royal crown in gilt.

In 1925, Binks went to India to paint 150 pictures of dogs for the Maharajah of Patiala.

Much of his work appeared in such UK publications as the weekly newspaper, The Sketch, Field magazine, Country Life magazine and Bystander magazine.
