= Royal corgis =

Corgi dogs belonging to Queen Elizabeth II

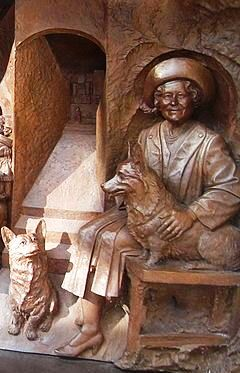
The Queen Mother Memorial bronze on The Mall, by Paul Day, shows her with two corgis.

The royal corgis are the Pembroke Welsh Corgi dogs formerly owned by Queen Elizabeth II and her parents, King George VI and Queen Elizabeth the Queen Mother. Fond of corgis since she was a small child, Elizabeth II owned more than 30 corgis from her accession in 1952 until her death in 2022. She owned at least one corgi throughout the years 1933 to 2018.

The royal corgis were globally publicised (such as in the cover photo and feature article of Vanity Fair's Summer 2016 edition). Leaving a lasting legacy after death, they have been depicted and immortalised in various artwork, such as statues, professional photographs, and paintings. For instance, the crown coin commemorating the Golden Jubilee of Elizabeth II depicts the Queen with a corgi.

== History ==
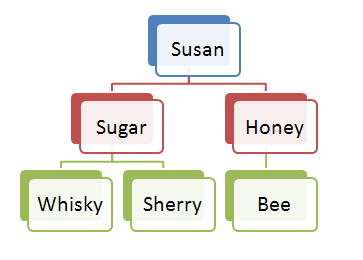
The first three generations from Susan.

The Queen was very fond of corgis since she was a small child, having fallen in love with the corgis owned by the children of the Marquess of Bath. King George VI brought home Dookie in 1933. A photograph from George VI's photo album shows a ten-year-old Princess Elizabeth (later Queen Elizabeth II) with Dookie at Balmoral. Elizabeth and her sister Princess Margaret would feed Dookie by hand from a dish held by a footman. The other early favourite corgi during the same time was Jane.

Elizabeth II's mother, at that time Queen Elizabeth, introduced a disciplined regimen for the dogs; each was to have its own wicker basket, raised above the floor to avoid draughts. Meals were served for each dog in its own dish, the diet approved by veterinary experts with no tidbits from the royal table. A proprietary brand of meat dog biscuits was served in the morning, while the late afternoon meal consisted of dog meal with gravy. Extra biscuits were handed out for celebrations and rewards.

Crackers (24 December 1939, Windsor – November, 1953) was one of the Queen Mother's corgis, and nearly a constant companion; he retired with the Queen Mother to the Castle of Mey in Scotland. In 1944, Elizabeth was given Susan as a gift on her 18th birthday. Susan accompanied Elizabeth on her honeymoon in 1947. The corgis owned by the Queen are descended from Susan. Rozavel Sue, daughter of Rozavel Lucky Strike, an international champion, was one of the Queen's corgis in the early 1950s.

One of Elizabeth's corgis mated with a Dachshund named Pipkin who belonged to Princess Margaret which resulted in the first royal dorgi. The two siblings would later breed more dorgis.

When Elizabeth and Prince Philip visited Grand Cayman in 1983, government officials gave her black coral sculptures of a corgi and a horse as a gift, both made by Bernard Passman.

== Domestic life ==
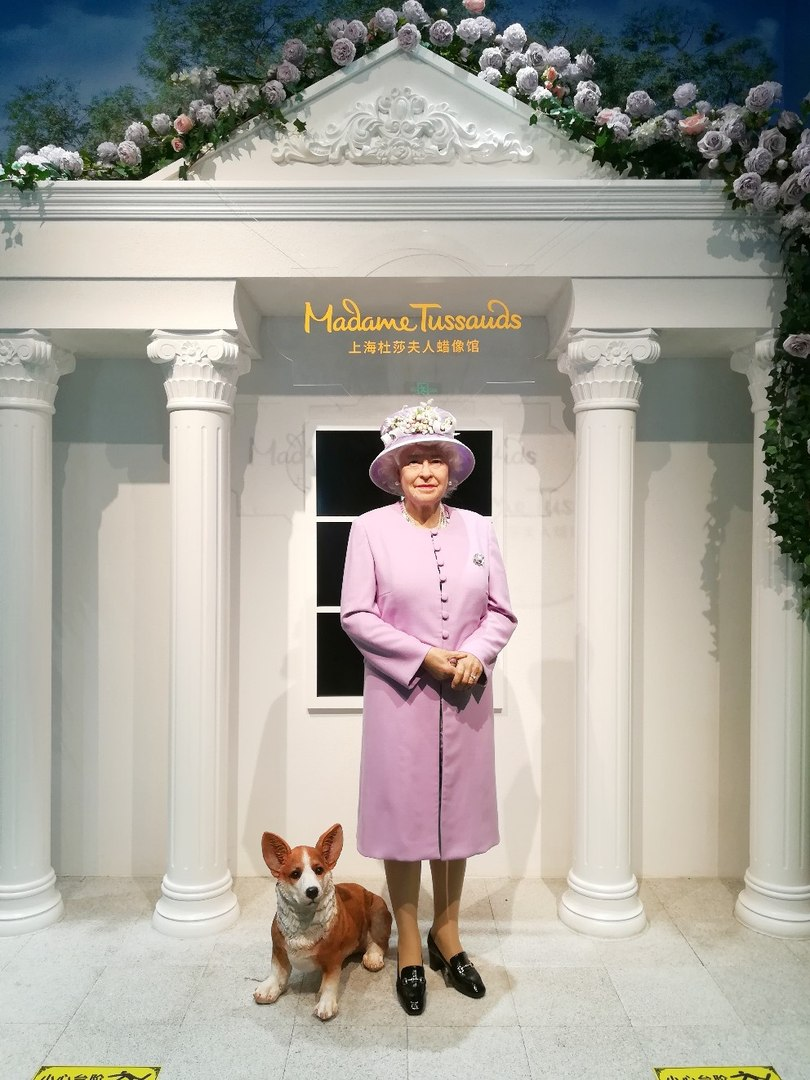
Wax figure of Elizabeth II with a corgi at Madame Tussauds Shanghai

Sugar was the nursery pet of Prince Charles (now Charles III) and Princess Anne. In 1955, her dogs, Whisky and Sherry, were surprise Christmas gifts from the Queen to the Prince and Princess. Pictured with the royal family, the corgi Sugar made the cover of The Australian Women's Weekly on 10 June 1959. Sugar's twin, Honey, belonged to the Queen Mother; Honey took midday runs with Johnny and Pippin, Princess Margaret's corgis, whilst the Princess lived in Buckingham Palace. Heather was born in 1962 and became one of the Queen's favourites. Heather was the mother of Tiny, Bushy, and Foxy; Foxy gave birth to Brush in 1969.

The corgis enjoyed a privileged life in Buckingham Palace. They resided in a bespoke room devoted to their habitation, known as the Corgi Room, and slept in elevated wicker baskets. The Queen tended to the corgis in her kennel herself. She also chose the sires of litters that were bred in her kennel. The corgis had an extensive menu at the palace which included fresh rabbit and beef, served by a gourmet chef. At Christmas, the Queen made stockings for the pets full of toys and delicacies such as biscuits. In 1999, one of Queen Elizabeth's royal footmen was demoted from Buckingham Palace for his "party trick of pouring booze into the corgis' food and water" and watching them "staggering about" with relish.

In 2007, the Queen was noted to have five corgis, Monty, Emma, Linnet, Willow, and Holly; five Cocker Spaniels, Bisto, Oxo, Flash, Spick, and Span; and four "Dorgis" (dachshund-corgi crossbreeds), Cider, Berry, Vulcan, and Candy. In 2012, Queen Elizabeth II's corgis Monty, Willow, and Holly appeared during the brief James Bond sketch when Daniel Craig arrived at Buckingham Palace for a mission to take the queen to the 2012 Summer Olympics opening ceremony. Monty, who had previously belonged to the Queen Mother, and one of her "Dorgis" died in September 2012. Monty had been named after the horse whisperer and friend of the Queen, Monty Roberts. It was reported in July 2015 that the Queen stopped breeding corgis as she did not wish any to survive her in the event of her death. Monty Roberts had urged Elizabeth to breed more corgis in 2012, but she had told him that she "didn't want to leave any young dog behind" and wanted to put an end to the practice.

By April 2018, with the death of Willow, the Queen no longer had any full-bred corgis. Only one dorgi, Candy, was still alive. Candy was joined by another Dorgi pup named Fergus and a pure-bred corgi called Muick in 2021, both gifts from her son Prince Andrew, and granddaughters Princesses Beatrice and Eugenie to cheer her up while her husband, Prince Philip, was recovering from heart surgery. Fergus however died from a heart defect at five-months old in the same year. In June 2021, the Queen was given a new corgi, Sandy, by Andrew, Beatrice and Eugenie. It was Sarah, Duchess of York, who found the puppies that were given to the Queen. After the Queen's death in September 2022, it was announced that Andrew and Sarah would adopt the two surviving royal corgis, and they would be resettled to their residence in the Royal Lodge on the Windsor Estate.

The dogs have traditionally been buried at the royal residence, Sandringham estate in Norfolk, at which they died. The graveyard was first used by Queen Victoria when her Collie, Noble, died in 1887.

== Attacks ==
On several occasions, the Queen or her staff have been injured by the corgis. In 1954, the palace clock winder, Leonard Hubbard, was bitten by Susan upon entering the nursery at the Royal Lodge, Windsor. Later in the same year, one of the Queen Mother's corgis bit a policeman on guard duty in London.

In 1968, Labour MP Peter Doig called for the royal staff to put up a "Beware of the dog" sign at Balmoral after one of the corgis bit a postman. In February 1989, it was reported that the royal family had hired an animal psychologist to tame the dogs after they developed a habit of nipping them and the staff. In 1989, the Queen Mother's dog Ranger led a pack of corgis that attacked and killed the Queen's beloved dorgi Chipper. In March 1991, the Queen was bitten after trying to break up a fight between ten or so of her corgis. She had to have three stitches to her left hand. John Collins, the Queen Mother's chauffeur, had to have a tetanus injection after he also tried to intervene. In 2003, Pharos, a tenth-generation offspring of Susan, was put down after being mauled by Princess Anne's English bull terrier, Dottie. Anne arrived at Sandringham to visit her mother for Christmas and the corgis rushed out of the front door as they arrived. It was reported that "Dottie went for Pharos, savaging the corgi's hind legs and breaking one in three places."

== Influence ==
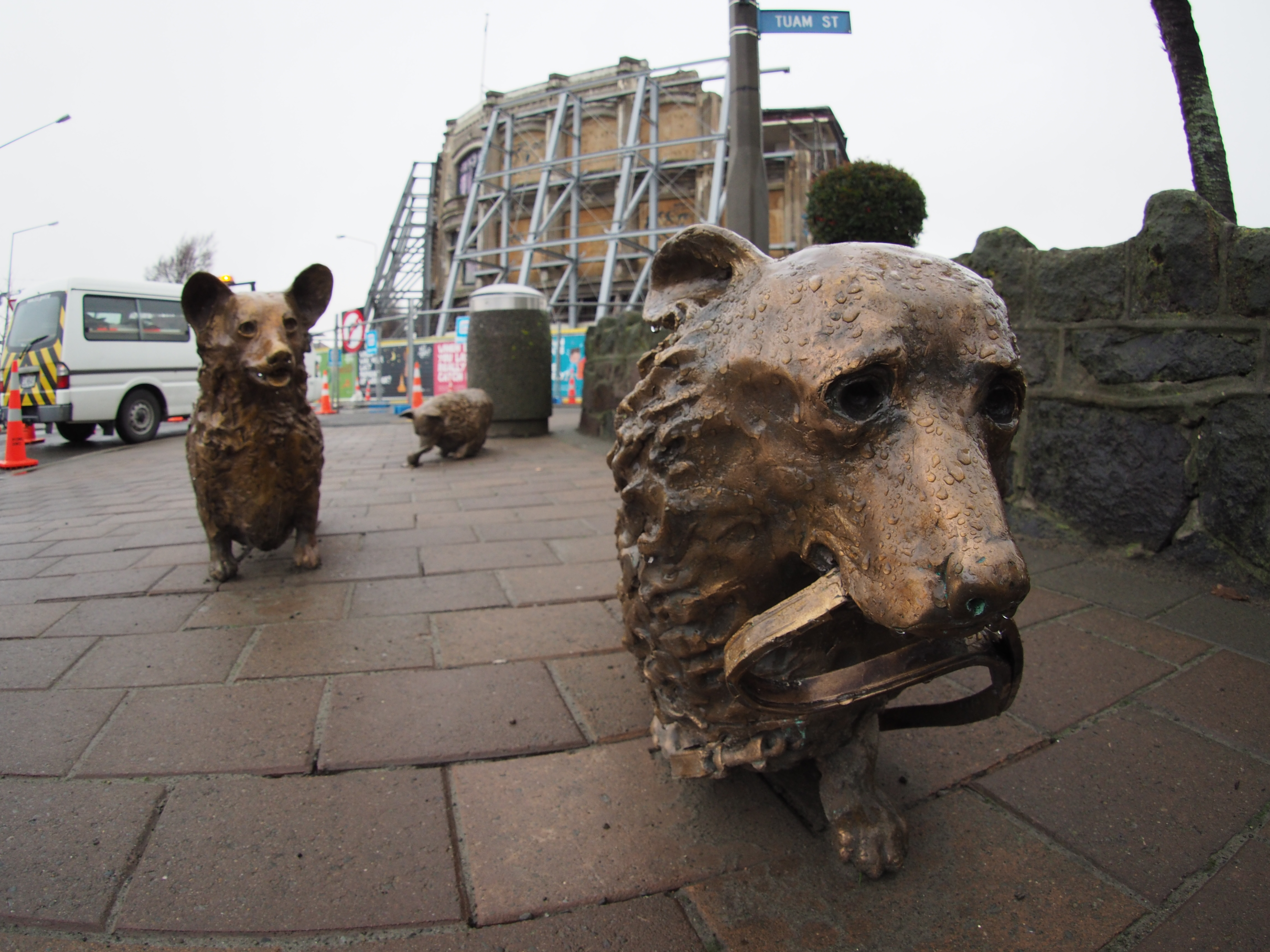
Statues of the royal corgis were installed on Doncaster High Street in 2003 to coincide with the Golden Jubilee of Elizabeth II the previous year.

The royal corgis are known all across the world and are closely associated with the former Queen. The corgis have had numerous items dedicated to them, in particular being the subject of many statues and works of art. Because of the Queen's fondness for the Welsh Corgi, an increased number of corgis were exhibited in the 1954 West Australian Canine Association's Royal Show. Queen Elizabeth II's crown coin KM# 1135, made of copper nickel of size 33 mm, issued during her Golden Jubilee year, shows the Queen with a corgi. Cartoonist Carl Giles included the corgis in every cartoon he drew of the Queen after 1962. The pets are the subject of an animated comedy film by Belgian studio NWave Pictures, called The Queen's Corgi, which was released in the UK in July 2019.

== See also ==
- Horses of Elizabeth II
- Queen Victoria's pets
- Caesar (dog)
- List of individual dogs
