= Bric-à-brac =

Lesser objets d'art for display

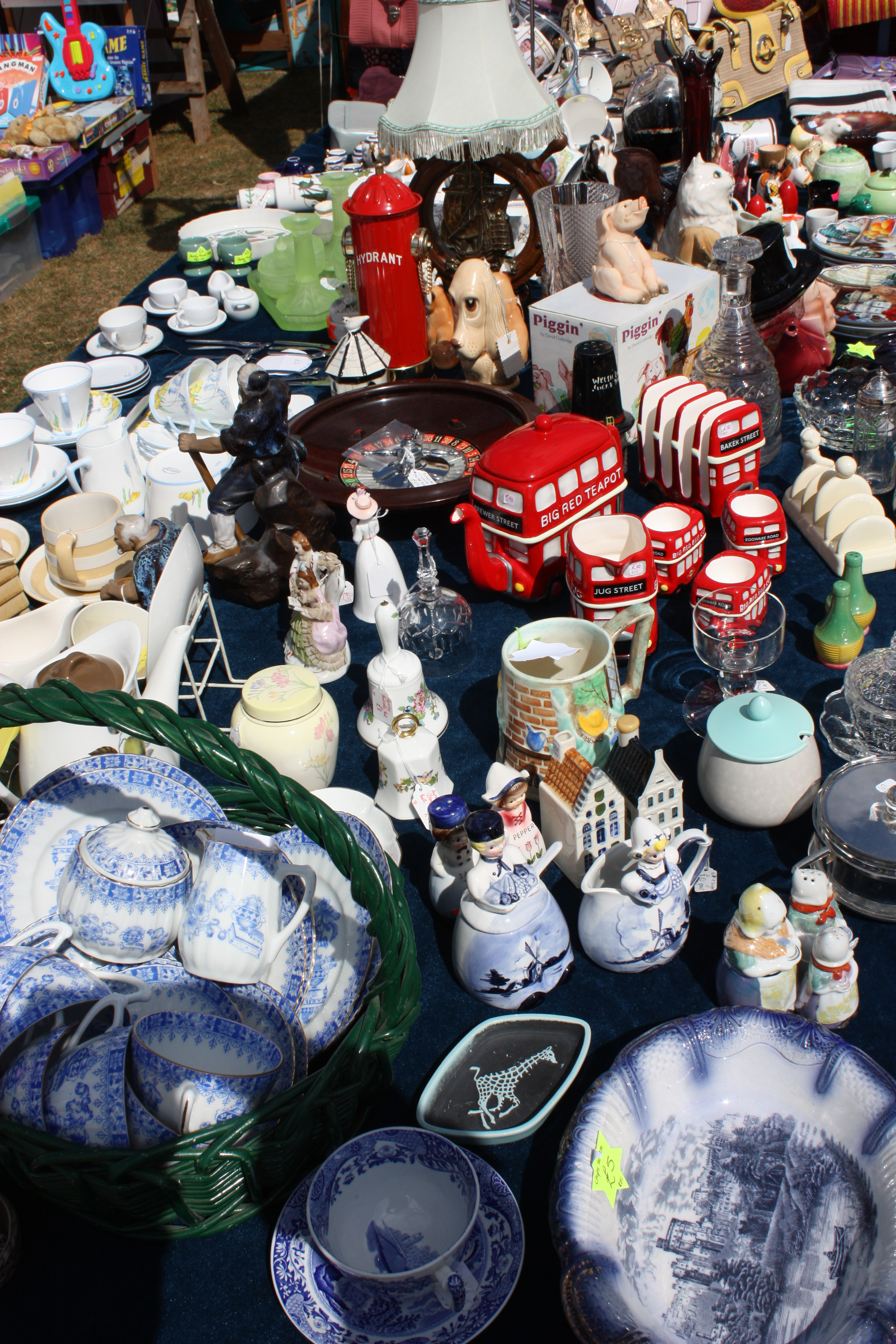
Bric-à-brac for sale at a street market in Cambridge

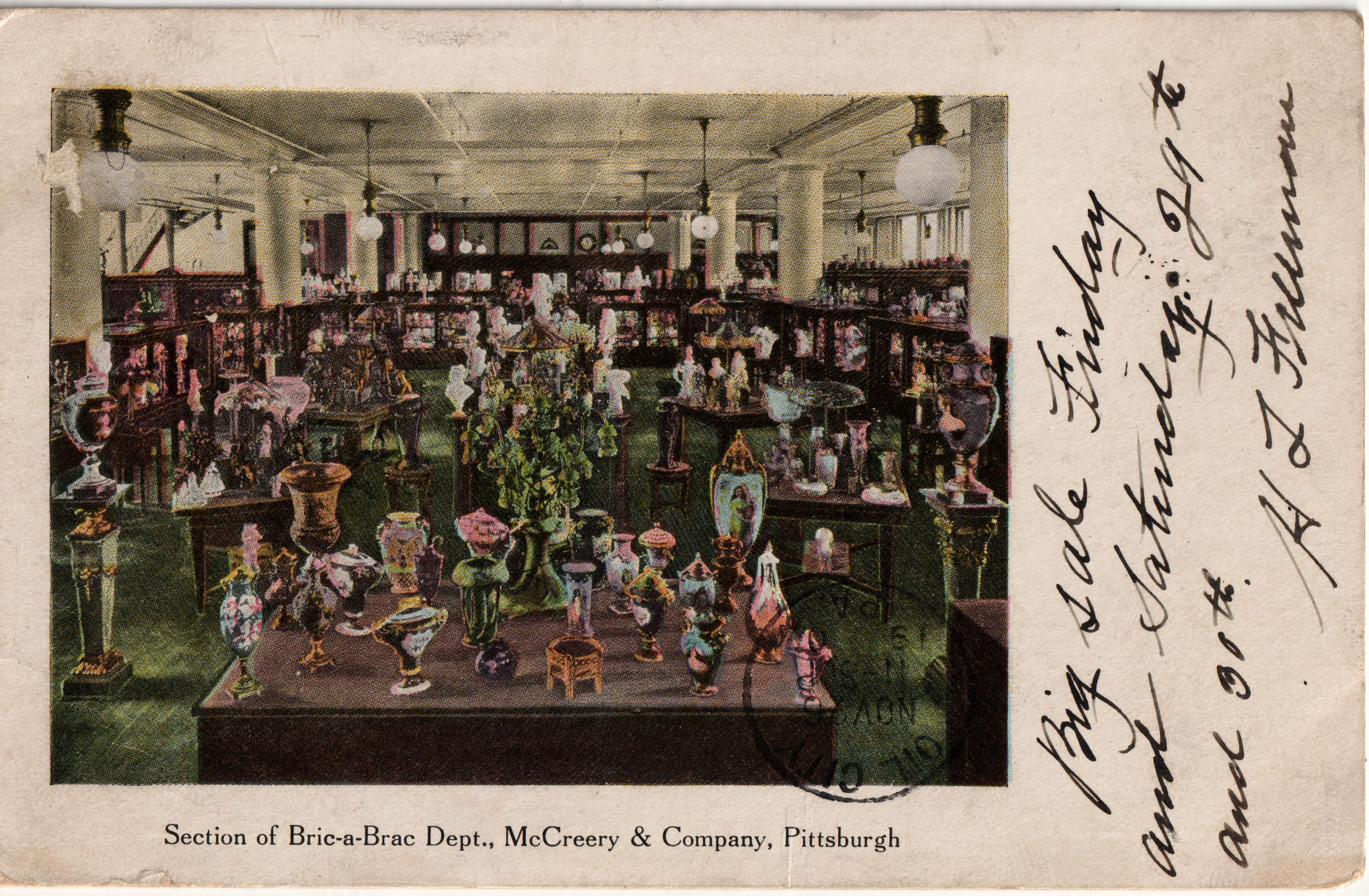
Section of bric-a-brac dept, McCreery & Company, Pittsburgh, Pennsylvania, about 1907

Bric-à-brac (French: [bʁi.ka.bʁak]) or bric-a-brac (from French), first used in England during the Victorian era, around 1840, refers to lesser objets d'art forming collections of curios. The French phrase a brick et a brac dates from the 16th century meaning "at random, any old way".

Shops selling such items, often referred to as "knick knacks" today, were often referred to as purveyors of "fancy goods", which might also include novelty items and other giftware. The curios in these shops or in home collections might have included items such as elaborately decorated teacups and small vases, compositions of feathers or wax flowers under glass domes, decorated eggshells, porcelain figurines, painted miniatures or photographs in stand-up frames.

In middle-class homes, bric-à-brac was used as ornament on mantelpieces, tables, and shelves, or was displayed in curio cabinets; sometimes these cabinets had glass doors to display the items within while protecting them from dust.

Today, "bric-à-brac" refers to a selection of items of modest value, often sold in street markets and charity shops.

In Yiddish, such items are known as tchotchkes.

Edith Wharton and Ogden Codman Jr., in The Decoration of Houses (1897), distinguished three gradations of quality in such "household ornaments": bric-à-brac, bibelots (trinkets) and objets d'art.

== See also ==
- Antique shop
- Discount store
- Novelty item
- Staffordshire dog figurine
- Variety store
