= Caesar (dog) =

Dog owned by King Edward VII (1898–1914)

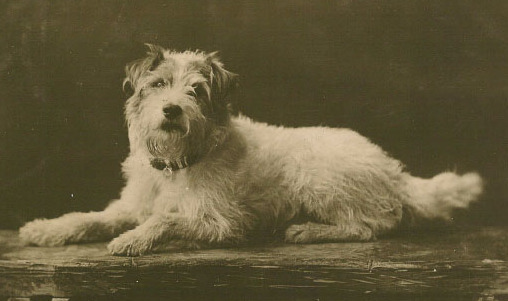
- A postcard featuring Caesar
- Species: Canis familiaris
- Breed: Wire Fox Terrier
- Sex: Male
- Born: Caesar of Notts; 1898
- Died: 18 April 1914 (aged 15–16)
- Resting place: Marlborough House, London; 51°30′18″N 0°8′9″W
- Nationality: Irish
- Owner: King Edward VII
- Parent: Cackler of Notts (sire)

Caesar (1898–1914) was a Wire Fox Terrier owned by King Edward VII. He was bred in the kennels of Kathleen, Duchess of Newcastle, and became the constant companion of the King. After the King's death in 1910, the dog attended the funeral and walked in the procession in a prominent position ahead of nine kings and other heads of state. Caesar has been the subject of paintings, and a hand crafted hardstone model created by the House of Fabergé.

== Early life ==
Caesar was born Caesar of Notts in 1898, and was sired by Cackler of Notts. He came from the kennels of Kathleen, Duchess of Newcastle, and was given to King Edward VII by Lord Dudley in 1902 to replace the King's dog Jack who had died after choking on food.

== Royal life ==
During his life with the King, he had a footman assigned to him to clean him and was allowed to sleep on an easy chair next to the King's bed. He wore a collar that read "I am Caesar. I belong to the King".

Caesar would always greet the King excitedly, and the King would often say "Do you like your old master, then?" while the dog was jumping up and down in excitement. Edward would never hit Caesar, but instead tell him off by shaking his walking stick at him while calling him a "naughty dog". Charles Hardinge, 1st Baron Hardinge of Penshurst, reminisced about spending time with the dog whilst on the royal yacht, "Whenever I went into the King's cabin, this dog always went for my trousers and worried them, much to the King's delight. I used not to take the slightest notice and went on talking all the time to the King which I think amused His Majesty still more." Caesar frequently caused problems for the King, escaping in Marienbad whilst chasing white peafowl and on another occasion killing rabbits owned by Lord Redesdale's daughters. The King even considered Caesar to be an obstacle to the Entente Cordiale. He asked his personal attendant, Lawrence Wrightson, to look after Caesar should he die before the dog.

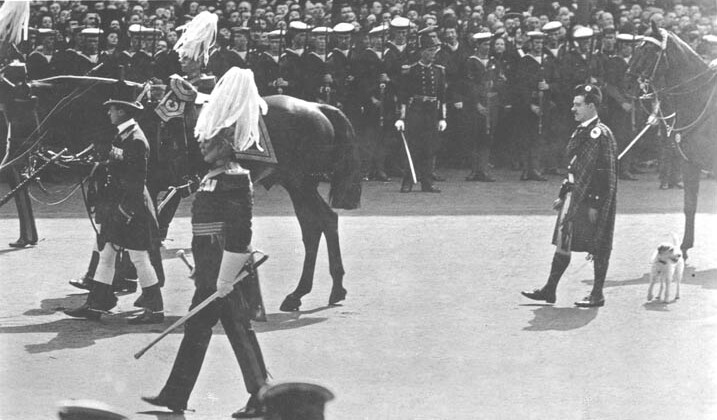
Caesar, accompanied by a highlander, at the King's funeral procession

The King ordered hardstone models of his favourite dogs and racehorses from the House of Fabergé. Caesar was at the King's side on the Norfolk estate when the initial wax models were revealed by the company. The model of Caesar was made of chalcedony, rubies, enamel and gold, and included Caesar's collar in the design. The finished model did not arrive until after the King's death, and was purchased by Dame Margaret Greville (for £35 (equivalent to £1,069 in 2025)), who gave the figure to Queen Alexandra. A painting of the dog was also created by Reuben Ward Binks for the King.

After the death of the King on 6 May 1910, Caesar refused to eat, and would spend time whining outside the King's bedroom. At one point, he managed to sneak into the King's bedroom and was found hiding under his bed by Queen Alexandra. The Queen encouraged him to eat once more and restored him to his normal self. Caesar attended the funeral of Edward VII, and led the funeral procession alongside a highlander leading the King's horse, walking behind the carriage that carried the King's coffin. He was placed ahead of the heads of state in the procession, including King George V and eight other Kings, an act of which Kaiser Wilhelm II of the German Empire disapproved.

== Later life ==
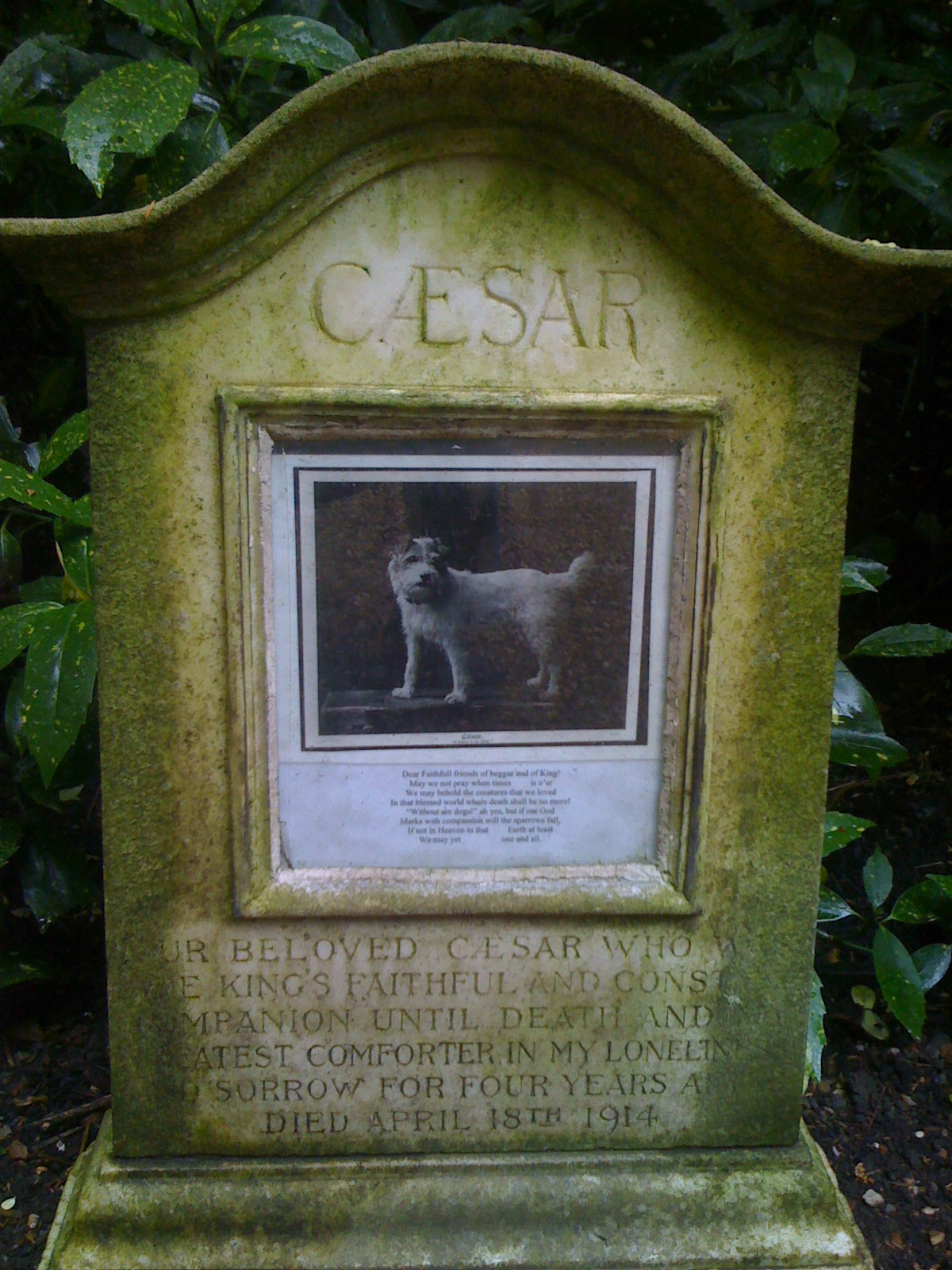
Caesar's grave at Marlborough House

Within a month of the funeral an unofficial book was published, Where's Master?, giving a first person account apparently written by Caesar from the king's death up to the funeral, something which made Queen Alexandra furious. The book was successful, running to nine reprints in the first year. After the King's death, a portrait of the dog was painted once more, this time by Maud Earl. The painting entitled Silent Sorrow, features Caesar resting his head on the King's favourite chair. The Steiff company produced stuffed toys based on Caesar around 1910.

He remained in the Royal household after the death of the king, although Alice Keppel, long-time mistress to the King, had enquired of Queen Alexandra about what was to happen to Caesar. Despite her previous dislike of the dog, the Queen took an interest in the terrier's care and tended to spoil him with treats, confessing to a friend that she was making up for the King being so strict towards him. Caesar died following an operation in April 1914. The Fabergé figurine now forms part of the Royal Collection, while Caesar was included in the tomb effigies of the King and Queen in St George's Chapel, Windsor Castle. In the sculpture, Caesar lies at the feet of the King.

== See also ==
- Dash (spaniel) – a King Charles Spaniel owned by Queen Victoria
- Susan (dog) – the first Pembroke Corgi owned by Queen Elizabeth II
- List of individual dogs
- Canadian Parliamentary Cats
- Chief Mouser to the Cabinet Office, United Kingdom
- Hermitage cats in Saint Petersburg, Russia
- Pets of Vladimir Putin
- Tibs the Great
- Cats of the President of Taiwan
- United States presidential pets
- Pets in the United Kingdom
