= Horses of Elizabeth II =

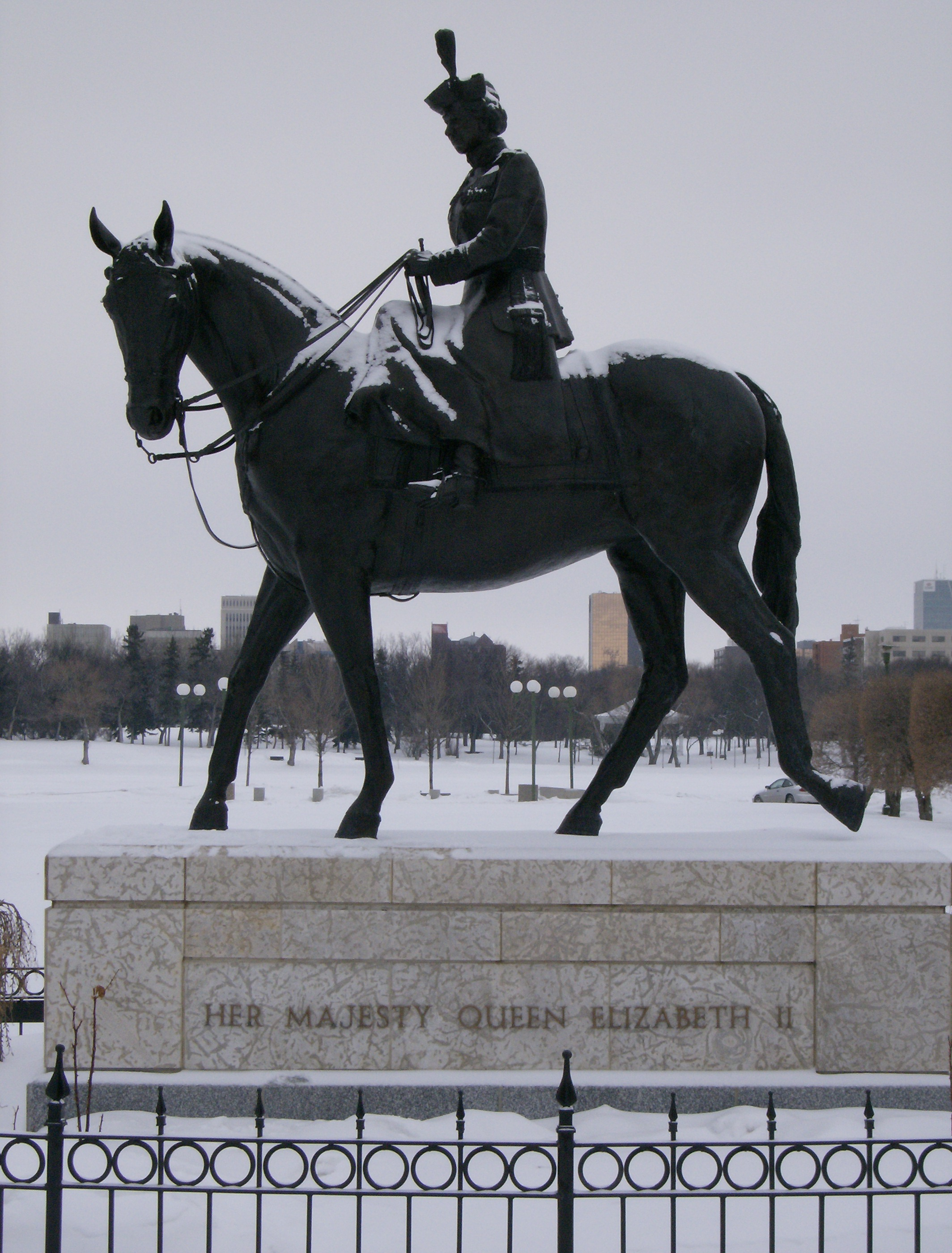
Statue of Elizabeth II on her favorite horse Burmese on the grounds of the Saskatchewan Legislative Building in Regina

From an early age, Elizabeth II took a keen interest in horses. Into her reign, this developed into one of her main leisure time activities with a particular emphasis on the breeding of thoroughbreds for horse racing.

== Riding ==
As a child, Elizabeth was given her first horse, a Shetland pony named Peggy, aged 4; she was riding aged 6. The pony was a gift from her grandfather George V. By age 18, she was an accomplished rider, and continued to ride for pleasure into her nineties.

In her role as monarch, Elizabeth also rode in a ceremonial role. From her first appearance as princess in 1947 and throughout her reign as queen until 1986, she attended the annual Trooping the Colour ceremony on horseback. Initially, she rode a bay police horse named Tommy in 1947. When her father, King George VI, was unwell, she rode in his place on his chestnut horse Winston, and she rode Winston after George VI's death. Later she rode a chestnut horse named Imperial. For eighteen consecutive years from 1969, her horse was a black mare named Burmese, a gift from the Royal Canadian Mounted Police. After Burmese was retired in 1987, the Queen attended in a carriage. The RCMP presented five more horses to the Queen: PSH Centenial in 1973, PSH Saint James in 1998, PSH Golden Jubilee in 2002, PSH George in 2009, and PSH Elizabeth in 2012.

== Racing ==
Racing colours of Queen Elizabeth II, as used by her father, King George VI, and great-grandfather King Edward VII: Purple, gold braid, scarlet sleeves, black velvet cap, gold fringe

Elizabeth owned many thoroughbred horses for use in racing, having initially inherited the breeding and racing stock of her late father King George VI, in 1952. Until the late 1960s, she raced her own-bred stock as well as horses bred by the National Stud. Her registered racing colours (termed silks), as worn by the jockeys riding her race horses, are the same as those used by her father and great-grandfather King Edward VII: a purple and scarlet jacket with gold braiding, with black cap. As of 2013, horses owned by the Queen won more than 1,600 races, and excluding the Epsom Derby have won all the British Classic Races, some multiple times. She also won a French Classic, the Prix de Diane, in 1974. She was named British flat racing Champion Owner in 1954 and 1957, the first reigning monarch ever to do so twice.

She had a 2nd place runner in the Derby, Aureole, in 1953, the year of her coronation. Her horse Dunfermline won two of the classics, the Epsom Oaks and St. Leger Stakes, in Elizabeth's Silver Jubilee year of 1977. She never gambled and is instead said to have had more interest from the outcome of a successful breeding match, but she is said to have read the Racing Post over breakfast every morning.

Other notable horses owned by Elizabeth include:

- Agreement
- Almeria
- Canisbay
- Carrozza
- Desert Hero
- Doutelle
- Estimate
- Highclere
- Hopeful Venture
- Magna Carta
- Pall Mall

Horse races named after Elizabeth II include:

- Queen Elizabeth II Challenge Cup Stakes
- Queen Elizabeth II Commemorative Cup
- Queen Elizabeth II Stakes
- The Queen’s Plate, 1952 to 2022

Between 2007 and 2022, 41 horses that raced in the royal colours were gifted to Elizabeth. After the Queen's death, her horses were inherited by her heir and successor, Charles III; the new King had his first winner, Just Fine, at Leicester in October 2022. It was announced later that month that the King was to sell fourteen of the late Queen's horses, including his first winner, Just Fine, and the Queen's last winner, Love Affairs. Within a few weeks, Charles began selling 30 of the nearly 100 thoroughbred horses he had inherited from his mother. The Guardian estimated that Charles had realised just over £2.25 million by selling some of the horses. Since March 2023, King Charles III and his wife, Queen Camilla have been joint owners of the royal horses.

== Breeding ==
Elizabeth took a keen interest in the breeding of her horses, and was the patron of the Thoroughbred Breeders' Association. She made regular visits to observe and assess her animals firsthand from birth and beyond. Her horses were foaled at the Royal Stud in the Sandringham Estate in Norfolk, England. As yearlings, they were raised at Polhampton Stud in Hampshire, before being passed on to the training facilities of any one of seven trainers (as of 2018 season). Once they finished racing, they remained in her care into retirement or were sold at various bloodstock sales. Her bloodstock and racing adviser was John Warren, who took over the role from his father-in-law, Henry Herbert, 7th Earl of Carnarvon, on his death in 2001. He had held the post since 1969.

As well as thoroughbreds, Elizabeth also bred Shetland ponies at Balmoral in Scotland and Fell ponies at Hampton Court. In 2007, she opened a full-time Highland pony stud at Balmoral to enhance and preserve the breed.

== Pageants and shows ==
Elizabeth II hosted the Royal Windsor Horse Show every year in Windsor Park, part of the royal estate in Berkshire. In her Diamond Jubilee year, an evening horse themed Diamond Jubilee Pageant was combined with the daytime show.

== Equestrian statues ==
Elizabeth II is depicted on horseback in statues in these places:

- Ottawa, Canada (Parliament Hill, unveiled 1992)
- Windsor, United Kingdom (Great Park, unveiled 2003)
- Regina, Canada (Legislative Building, unveiled 2005)

== Documentaries ==
In 1974, Elizabeth II's interest in horses was the subject of a documentary, The Queen's Race Horses: a Private View, which she herself narrated. In 2013, as part of the 60th anniversary of the Coronation celebrations, Clare Balding presented the BBC documentary The Queen: a Passion for Horses.

== See also ==
- Queen Victoria's pets
- Royal corgis
- List of historical horses
