= Queen Victoria's journals =

Personal diaries of Queen Victoria

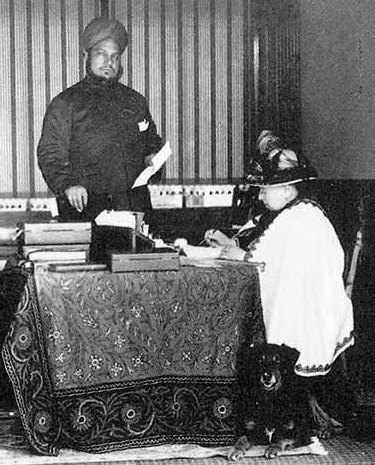
Queen Victoria, attending to her correspondence. She is attended by her Indian secretary, Abdul Karim, and her favourite collie, Noble.

Victoria's signature

Queen Victoria maintained diaries and journals throughout her life, filling 122 volumes which were expurgated after her death by her daughter Princess Beatrice. Extracts were published during her life and sold well. The collection is stored in the Royal Archives and, in 2012, was put online in partnership with the Bodleian Libraries.

== Creation ==
Victoria started a daily journal in 1832, when she was just thirteen years old, and her first words were, "This book, Mamma gave me, that I might write the journal of my journey to Wales in it." The keeping of such journals was common at that time. She was instructed in this by her governess, Louise Lehzen, and her mother inspected the journals each day until she became queen.

She continued writing until just ten days before her death, 69 years later, filling 122 volumes. She also wrote many letters, and, with the journals, it is estimated that she wrote over two thousand words a day — about sixty million words during her lifetime.

== Publication ==
Extracts of her journals were published during her lifetime such as Leaves from the Journal of Our Life in the Highlands which was published in 1868. The first edition sold twenty thousand copies, which was a great success. Further editions were printed, and a sequel was published — More Leaves from the Journal of Our Life in the Highlands. Extracts of her journals also appeared in Theodore Martin's biography of Prince Albert — The Life of His Royal Highness the Prince Consort — which was published in five volumes from 1875 to 1880.

== Expurgation ==
Victoria's daughter, Princess Beatrice, was her literary executor. She went through all the journals and, as instructed by the Queen, removed anything which might upset the royal family. The expurgated version created by Beatrice filled 111 hand-written volumes. Most of the originals from 1840 onwards were then destroyed, despite opposition from Victoria's grandson King George V and his wife, Queen Mary. The nature of Beatrice's editing can be judged by comparison with the typescript copies which were made earlier by Lord Esher for his book, The Girlhood of Queen Victoria. These cover the period from 1832 to 1840; for instance, on 13 February 1840, Victoria recorded her delight at Albert putting on her stockings and then watching him shave. This incident does not appear in Beatrice's copy:

Esher transcription	Beatrice transcription
Got up at 20 m. to 9. My dearest Albert put on my stockings for me. I went in and saw him shave; a great delight for me. We breakfasted at ½ p. 9 together. Wrote to Lord M in A.'s room. Sang to him. Dressed &c. I passed through the middle room where Lord Melbourne was with Albert. Wrote my journal. A. and I went to see Ma.. At 20 m. to 1 Albert, my dearest Albert, drove me out in the Pony carriage, the ladies following in carriages, and the gentlemen on horseback; we met Papa driving the Duchess of Sutherland; we met the Hounds, coming home; Ernest in a red coat and top boots; and in high spirits at the Hunt. It was a lovely day; we came home at 10 m. p. 2. At ½ p. 2 we all lunched in the Oak room. Mama came to our rooms, and then Ernest came and stayed with us. At 5 m. p. 4 Lord Melbourne came to me and stayed with me till 5 m. to 5. He was not very well; talked of our having driven out; there being bad news from China; ...	We went to see Mama after breakfast & I wrote my Journal, &c. — Before 1, dearest Albert drove me out in the Pony Phaeton, the Ladies following in carriages, & the Gentlemen on horseback. We met Papa driving the Dss of Sutherland, & the Hounds coming back, Ernest in a red coat & top boots, in high spirits at the Hunt. It was a lovely day. — We all lunched in the Oak Rooms. Mama afterwards came to our rooms, & then Ernest came & stayed with us. — Saw Ld Melbourne, before 4, who stayed with me nearly an hour. Talked of there being bad news from China; ...

== Archive ==
More Leaves from the Journal of a life in the Highlands, from 1862 to 1882

The journals are stored in the Royal Archives in Windsor Castle. In 2012, they were scanned and made available online as a special project for the diamond jubilee of Victoria's great-great-granddaughter Queen Elizabeth II. Although initially made available for free worldwide, since mid-2013 free access to the diaries has been restricted to users within the United Kingdom only.

== Sources ==
- Gannett, Cinthia (1992), Gender and the Journal: diaries and academic discourse, SUNY Press, ISBN 978-143840381-6
- Kennedy, Maev (24 May 2012), "Queen Victoria's private journals published online", The Guardian
- Marcus, Sharon (2009), Between Women: Friendship, Desire, and Marriage in Victorian England, Princeton University Press, ISBN 978-140083085-5 – via Internet Archive
- Nelson, Michael (2007), Queen Victoria and the Discovery of the Riviera, Tauris Parke, ISBN 978-184511345-2
- "The secrets of Queen Victoria", British Heritage Travel, 14 October 2021
- Ward, Yvonne (2013), Unsuitable for Publication: Editing Queen Victoria, Black, ISBN 978-186395594-2
- Wilson, Benji (11 March 2010), "Victoria: a Royal Love Story - Why the Prince of Wales "had a twinkle in his eye"", The Daily Telegraph
- Worsley, Lucy (2011), If Walls Could Talk: An intimate history of the home, Faber & Faber, ISBN 978-057125953-3
