= Tibs the Great =

British Post Office's "number one cat"

Post Office Cat General Post Office
- In office 1950–1964
- Appointed by: Alf Talbut
- Postmasters General: Ness Edwards; Herbrand Sackville; Charles Hill; Ernest Marples; Reginald Bevins
- Assistant Postmasters General: Charles Rider Hobson; Leonard David Gammans; Cuthbert Alport; Kenneth Thompson; Mervyn Pike; Ray Mawby; Joseph Slater

Personal details
- Born: November 1950 London, England
- Died: December 1964 (age 14) London, England
- Other name: Tibs
- Species: Cat
- Sex: Male
- Parent: Minnie (mother)

Tibs the Great (November 1950 – December 1964) was the British Post Office's "number one cat" and kept the post office headquarters in London completely mouse-free during his 14 years of service. He was the son of Minnie, and on his death, several newspapers ran an obituary.

== Background ==
Cats had been officially employed by the Post Office to catch rodents since September 1868, when three cats were taken on for a six-month trial period at a rate of one shilling per week, in the London Money Order Office. On 7 May 1869, it was noted that "the cats have done their duty very efficiently". By 1873, the cats were being paid 1s 6d, and cats were being employed in other post offices.

== Early life ==
It is thought that Tibs was born in London in November 1950. His father is unknown. His mother was Minnie, another "fine cat".

== Career ==
Tibs worked at Post Office Headquarters in London for 14 years, and was officially employed and paid 2s 6d per week. He worked in the basement. He was cared for by Alf Talbut, cleaner at the General Post Office in St. Martin's Le Grand (later known as GPO East), who had also owned his mother, Minnie. During his 14 years, Tibs kept the Post Office headquarters completely free of mice.

In 1952, there was "public outrage" that the cats had not had a pay rise since 1873, and the next year there was a question in the House of Commons, asking the Assistant Postmaster-General, David Gammans, "when the allowance payable for the maintenance of cats in his department was last raised?"

Gammans replied,

There is, I am afraid, a certain amount of industrial chaos in the Post Office cat world. Allowances vary in different places, possibly according to the alleged efficiency of the animals and other factors. It has proved impossible to organise any scheme for payment by results or output bonus. These servants of the State are, however, frequently unreliable, capricious in their duties and liable to prolonged absenteeism.
My hon. and gallant Friend has been misinformed regarding the differences between rates for cats in Northern Ireland and other parts of the United Kingdom. There are no Post Office cats in Northern Ireland. Except for the cats at Post Office Headquarters who got the special allowance a few years ago, presumably for prestige reasons, there has been a general wage freeze since July, 1918, but there have been no complaints!

He also hastened to assure the House that Post Office cats had "an adequate maternity service", and that equal pay prevailed in the group.

== In media ==
In 1953, Tibs was featured in a book titled Cockney Cats by Warren Tute and Felix Fonteyn. He also appeared at a "Cats and Film Stars" party.

== Death ==
Tibs died in December 1964; he had been suffering from oral cancer. He received obituaries in several newspapers. By the time of his death he had grown to 23 lb (10 kg) in weight, probably due to living in one of the staff dining rooms, rather than from eating rats.

The last cat employed at Post Office headquarters was Blackie, who died in 1984, which coincided with cloth sacks being replaced with rodent-resistant plastic sacks.

== See also ==
- Chief Mouser to the Cabinet Office
- Stubbs, an American cat appointed honorary mayor of Talkeetna, Alaska
- Tama (cat), Stationmaster of Kishi Station, Wakayama, Japan
- List of individual cats
