= Pembroke Welsh Corgi =

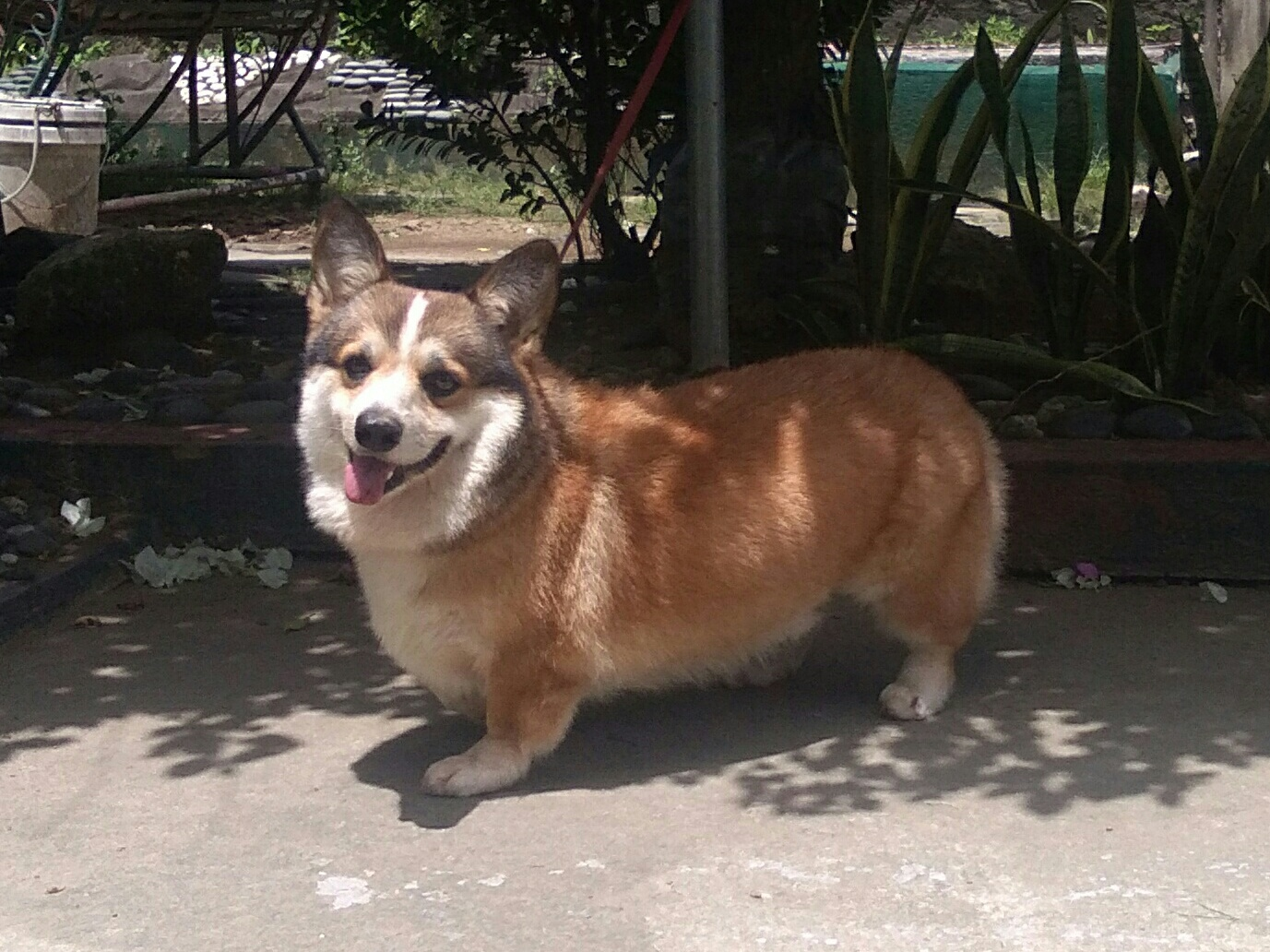
- Common nicknames: Corgi, Welsh Corgi, Pembroke
- Origin: Wales
Traits
Height	Males	10–12 in (25–30 cm)
	Females	10–12 in (25–30 cm)
Weight	Males	24–31 lb (11–14 kg)
	Females	24–28 lb (11–13 kg)
- Coat: Medium length, thick, weather-resist double coat
- Color: Fawn, Black & Tan, Black & White, Red, Sable
Kennel club standards
- The Kennel Club: standard
- Fédération Cynologique Internationale: standard

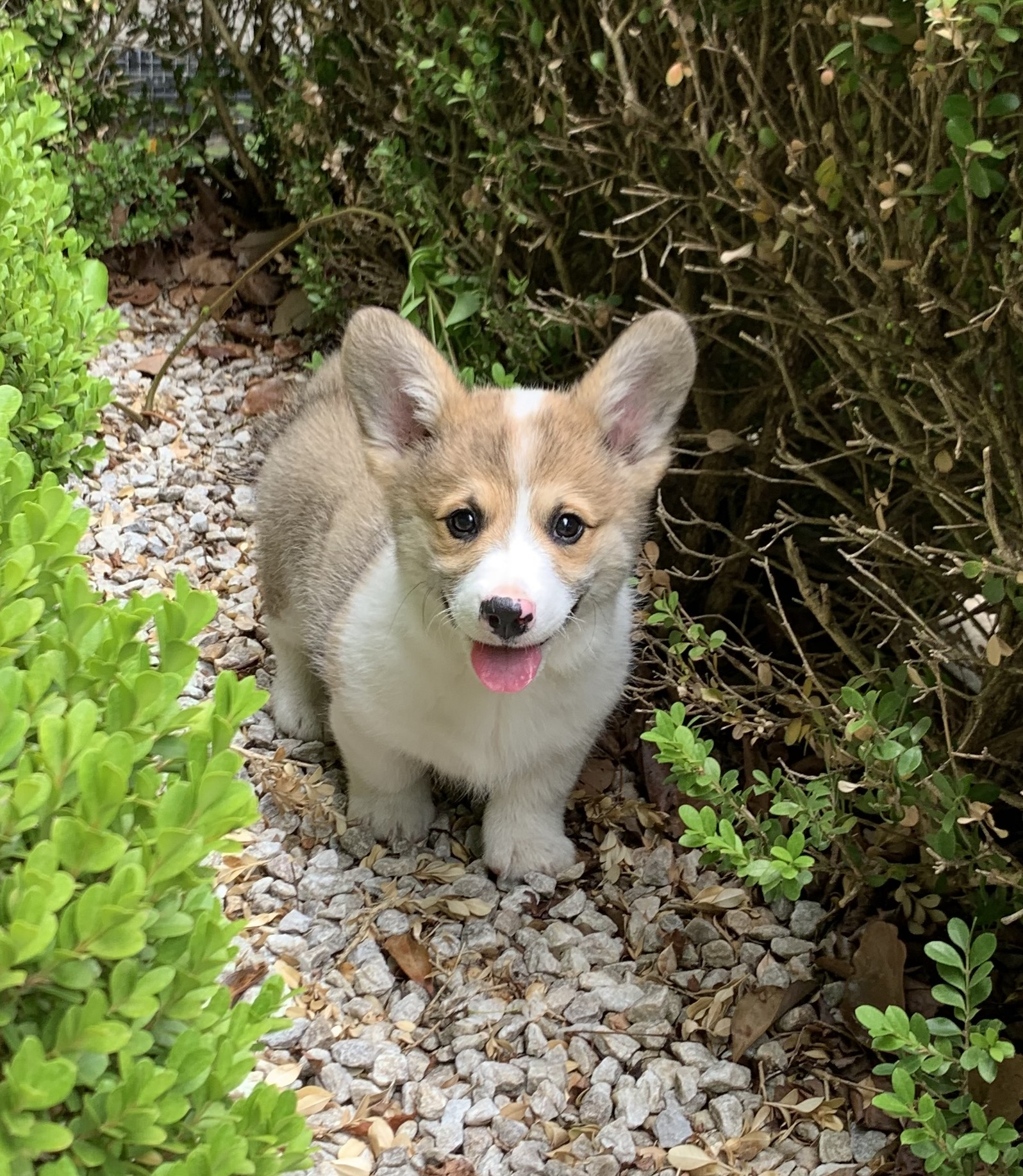
Sable Pembroke Welsh Corgi puppy (6 weeks old)

The Pembroke Welsh Corgi (/ˈkɔːrɡi/; Welsh for "dwarf dog" (Note: See Wiktionary: corgi § Welsh)) is a cattle herding dog breed that originated in Pembrokeshire, Wales. The name Corgi is of Welsh origin, and is a compound of the words cor and ci (mutated to gi), meaning "dwarf" and "dog", respectively. It is one of two breeds known as a Welsh Corgi, the other being the Cardigan Welsh Corgi. Pembroke Welsh Corgis are descended from the Spitz family of dog.

Pembroke Welsh Corgis are famous as the preferred breed of Queen Elizabeth II, who owned more than 30 Royal corgis during her reign. Although these dogs have been favoured by British royalty for more than seventy years, among the British public they have recently fallen into decline in terms of popularity and demand. However, they remain very popular in the United States. Cities such as New York, Boston, Los Angeles, and San Francisco hold annual "Corgi Meetups" in which hundreds of dogs and their owners congregate to spend the day.

The Pembroke Welsh Corgi has been ranked 11th in Stanley Coren's The Intelligence of Dogs, which states that the breed is considered an excellent working dog. Pembroke Welsh Corgis were ranked 11th most popular breed of dog in 2020 according to the American Kennel Club.

== Description ==
=== Appearance ===
Pembroke Welsh Corgis differ from the Cardigan Welsh Corgi by being shorter in length, having smaller ears, and being slightly straighter of leg.

The Pembroke Welsh Corgi has erect ears that are in proportion to the equilateral triangle of the head. The breed standard indicates that the ears should be firm, medium in size, and tapered slightly to a rounded point. The head should be "fox-like" in shape and appearance. The Pembroke breed usually weighs around 22 - 27 lbs(10 to 12 kilos). They often measure between 8 to 12 inches, or 20 to 30 centimeters, and on average, live to be around 13 years old.

Due to the Pembroke Welsh Corgi having a double coat, they shed heavily all year round, with peaks in the spring and autumn. With regular brushing, their coat is fairly easy to maintain, as well as naturally water- and dirt repellent (at the exception of "fluffies"). Intact females are also known to shed during heat. Their coat has somewhat lighter markings on each side of the withers caused by changes in the thickness, length, and direction of hair growth. The Pembroke coat also varies in color, going from a reddish, or even sand color, to brown and black. Along with these differing colors, their coats will also sometimes contain a speckling of white spots.

Breed faults exist and should not be bred on purpose; such as corgis with a very long and thinner coat coming from a recessive gene and red coats present with a bluish cast which have a diluted colour.

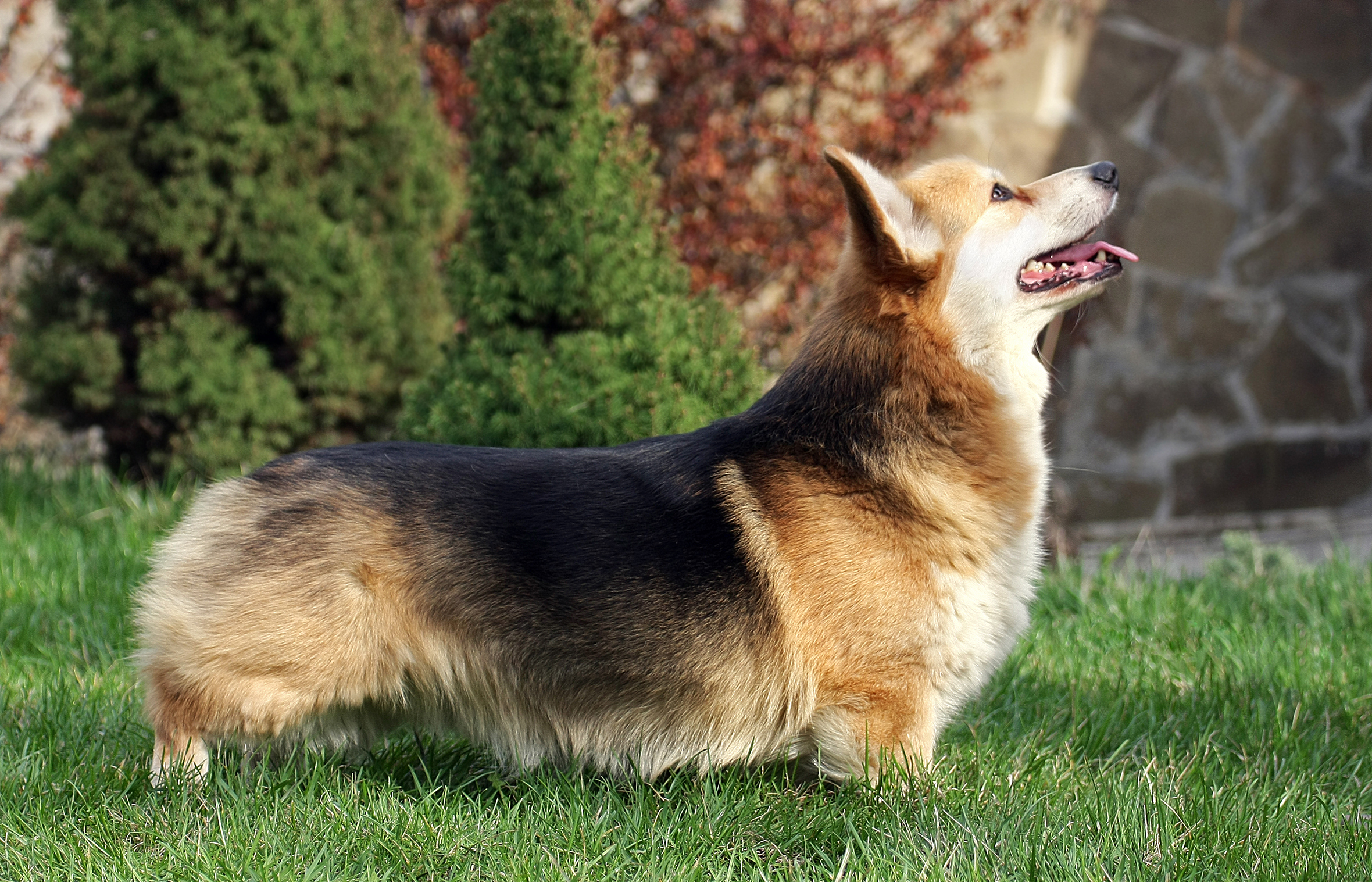
Tricolour Pembroke Welsh Corgi

While some outlying Pembroke Welsh Corgis are born with their tail naturally short, the majority often have their tails docked between 2–5 days old due to historical tradition or to conform to the Breed Standard. Artificial docking was not needed for the dog to do its job as a herding dog in the United Kingdom as many claim (since Cardigan Welsh corgis were also herding dogs but never docked) but rather because a non-herding dog was considered a luxury under tax law and attracted a tax, so to demonstrate that their dogs were herding dogs, owners had to ensure the dogs had docked tails. The Kennel Club, the United Kennel Club, and the FCI allow intact tails in Conformation shows. The AKC Standard states tails should be docked no longer than 2 inches (5 cm). In many countries including the United Kingdom, docking has been deemed illegal.

=== Temperament ===
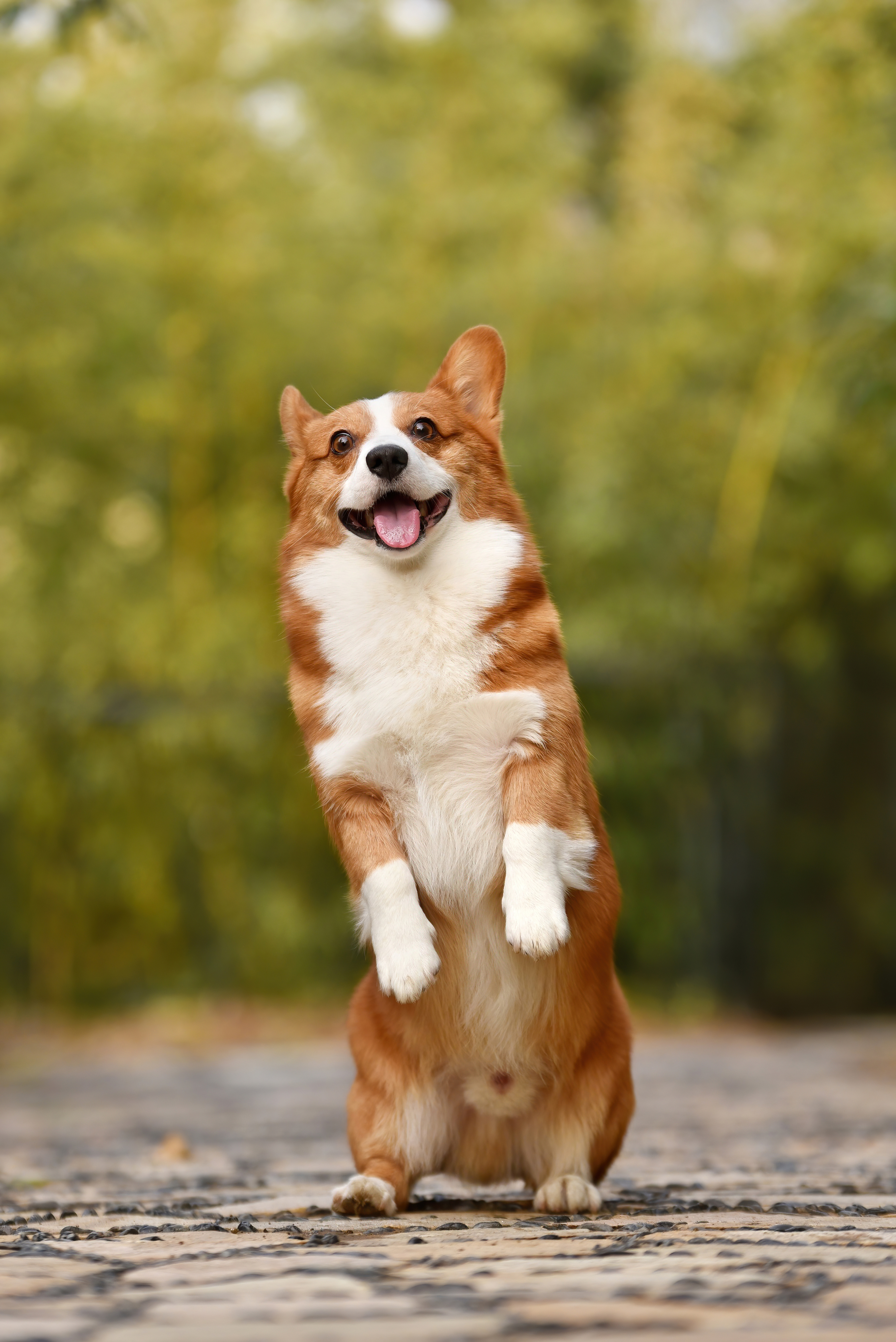
Welsh Corgi puppy standing on rear legs and sticking out the tongue

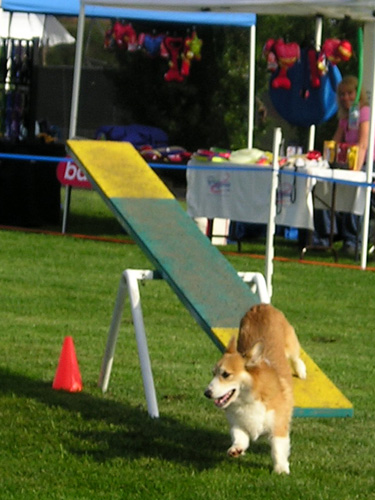
Pembroke leaving teeter-totter during a dog agility competition.

Pembroke Welsh Corgis love to be involved in the family, and tend to follow wherever their owners go. They have a great desire to please their owners, thus making them eager to learn and train. The dogs can also be challenging to train due to their working background, stubbornness and intelligence – they were ranked as the eleventh most intelligent dog in Stanley Coren's The Intelligence of Dogs. Besides herding, they also function as watchdogs due to their alertness and tendency to bark, which can be aggravated if they are not stimulated adequately. Most Pembrokes will seek the attention of everyone they meet and behave well around children and other pets. It is important to socialise this breed with other animals, adults, and children when they are very young to avoid any anti-social behaviour or aggression later in life. Another thing to keep in mind is that with this need for stimulation, they also have a need for exercise, as they can easily become overweight. They love to run around and dig holes, and due to their herding and – for some – prey instinct, they love to chase anything that moves, so it is best to keep them inside fenced areas. The herding instinct will also cause some younger Pembrokes to nip at their owners' ankles as this is what they were bred to do with cattle.

== Health ==
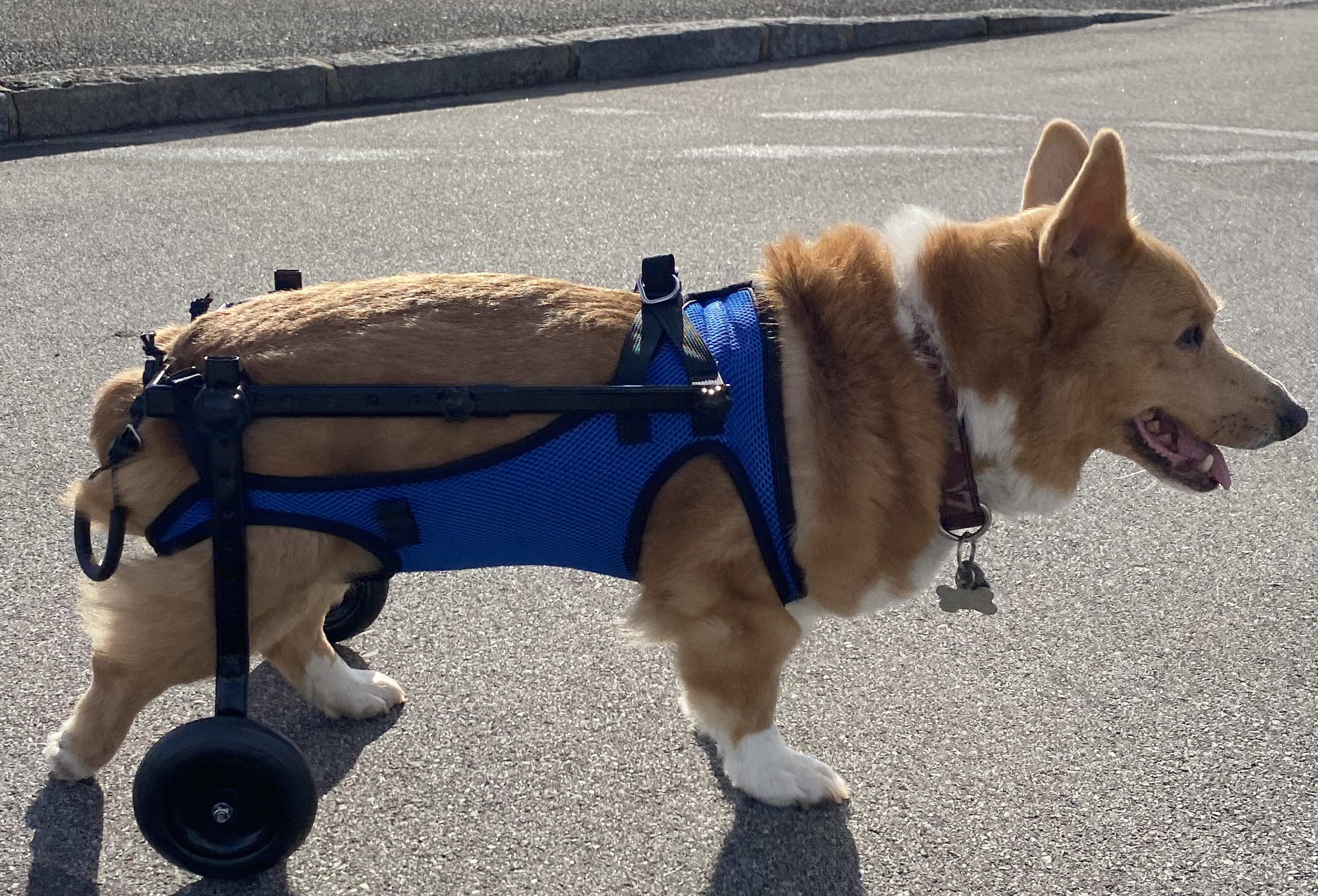
A 14 year old Corgi affected by degenerative myelopathy using a wheelchair to walk

A 2024 UK study found a life expectancy of 13.2 years for the breed compared to an average of 12.7 for purebreeds and 12 for crossbreeds. Pembroke Welsh Corgis are achondroplastic, meaning they are a "true dwarf" breed. As such, their stature and build can lead to certain non-inherited health conditions, but genetic issues should also be considered. Commonly, Pembrokes can suffer from monorchidism, Von Willebrand's disease, hip dysplasia, degenerative myelopathy (DM), and inherited eye problems such as progressive retinal atrophy. Genetic testing is available for Pembroke Welsh Corgis to avoid these issues and enhance the genetic health pool. Pembrokes are also prone to obesity given a robust appetite, characteristic of herding group breeds.

== History ==
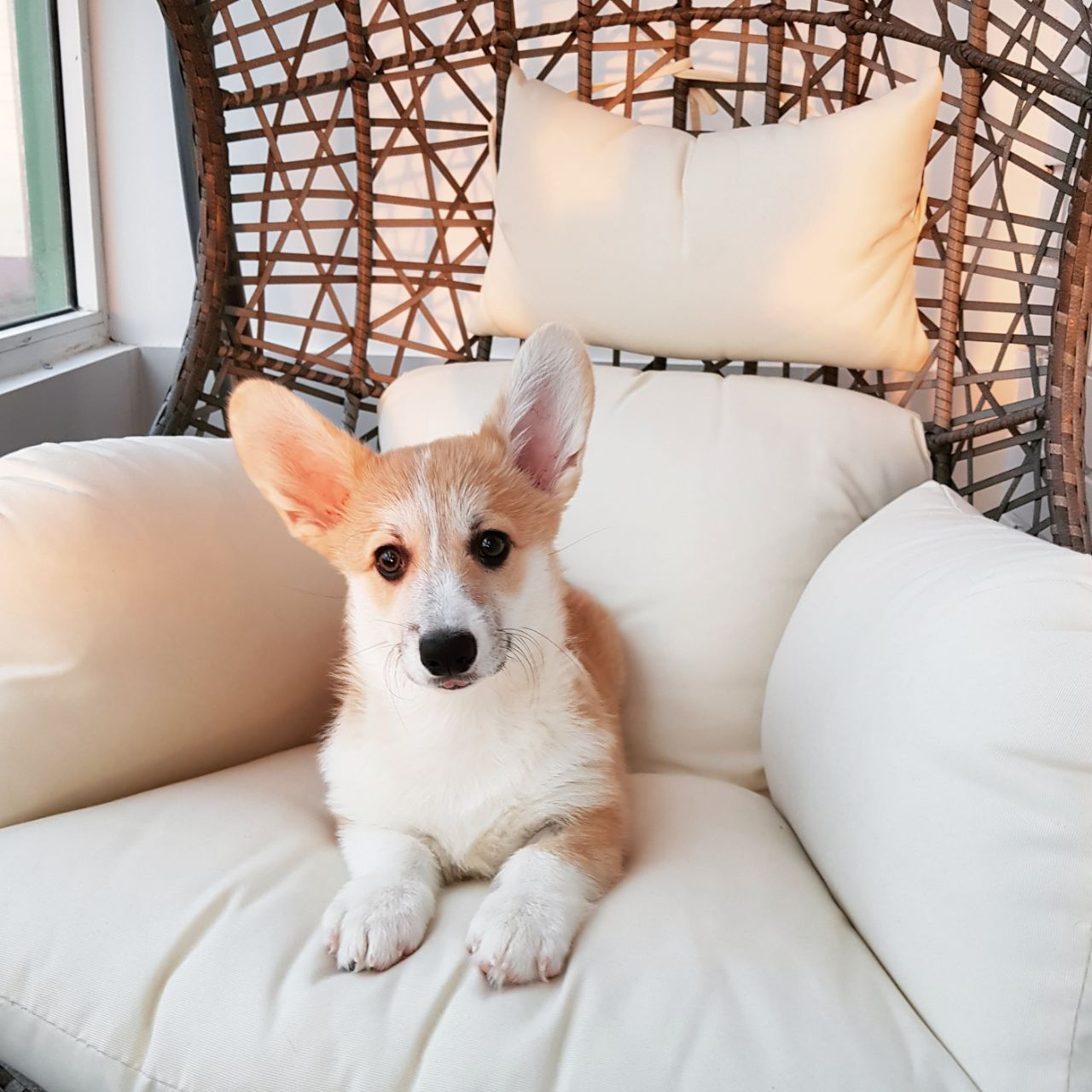
Corgi at 4 months, when they are starting to get their typical fawn colour. Compared to other dogs, their ears look big compared to their head.

While the Cardigan Welsh Corgi is thought to originate with the arrival of Celtic culture (around 1200 BCE), the Pembroke Welsh Corgi is more commonly stated to originate with the Flemish plantations that were settled in Pembrokeshire following the Norman Invasion of Wales. These isolated settlements were entirely dependent on the English crown for their survival in Wales and would have brought continental dog breeds such as Pomeranians and schipperke with them. As such, the lineage of the Pembroke Welsh Corgi has been traced back to AD 1107. These breeds, with their agility, smaller stature and shorter legs, were excellent working dogs and were used by both the Flemish and native Welsh to herd of cattle.

As show dogs, Pembrokes and Cardigans first appeared together in 1925 when they were shown under the rules of The Kennel Club in Britain. The Corgi Club was founded in December 1925 in Carmarthen, Carmarthenshire. It is reported that the local members favoured the Pembroke breed, so a club for Cardigan enthusiasts was founded a year or so later. Both groups have worked hard to ensure the appearance and type of breed are standardised through careful selective breeding. Pembrokes and Cardigans were officially recognised by the Kennel Club in 1928 and were initially categorised together under the single heading of Welsh Corgis before the two breeds were recognised as separate and distinct in 1934.

Pembroke Welsh Corgis are becoming more popular in the United States and rank 15th (24th) in American Kennel Club registrations, as of 2024 (2012). However, corgis are now listed as a "vulnerable" breed in the United Kingdom; the decline has been said to be due to a 2007 ban on tail-docking (the practice of cutting off the animal's tail) in the UK, as well as the lack of breeders in the UK. In 2009, the corgi was added to The Kennel Club's "At Watch" list of British breeds when annual registrations numbered between 300 and 450. In 2014, the breed was put on the Club's "Vulnerable Native Breeds" list when registrations dropped under 300. In 2018, the breed came off the "At-Risk" list with 456 puppies registered in December 2017. The Kennel Club has credited the renewed interest in the breed to the popular Netflix television series, The Crown, and others. The Pembroke Welsh Corgi has also appeared in the American television Brooklyn Nine-Nine as the pet dog of Captain Raymond Holt and Kevin M. Cozner and is shown to be extremely loyal. Ein, a Corgi with human-level intelligence, is one of the 5 main characters in the TV show Cowboy Bebop.

== Folklore ==
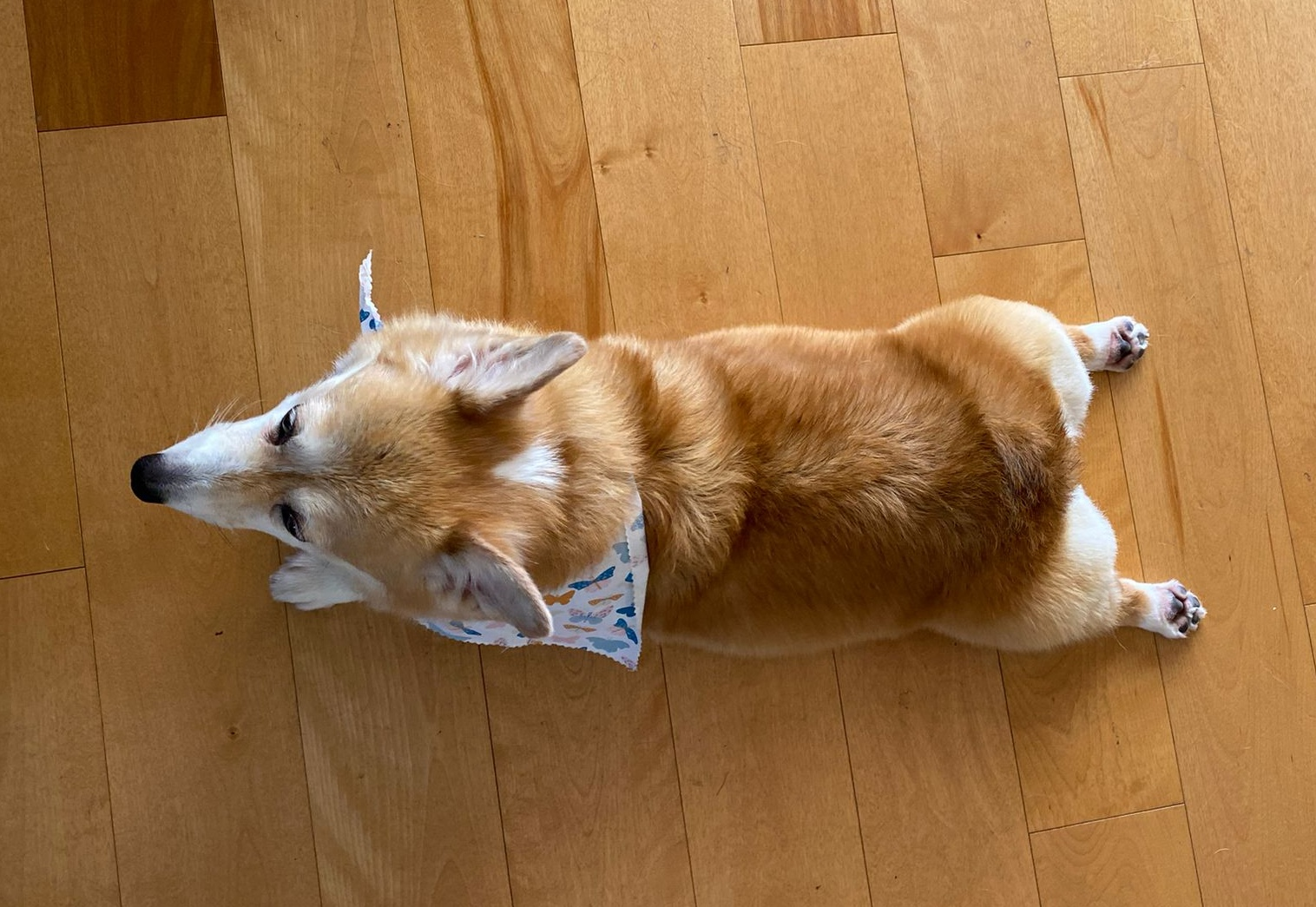
An eleven year old Pembroke Welsh Corgi. The area of fur around the shoulders has a distinct thickness and direction to the rest. This is known as a "fairy saddle" from the belief that fairies would ride the dogs as steeds

In Welsh folklore the Corgi is associated with the Tylwyth Teg (Welsh fairies). While there are variations on the story, most state that the dogs were gifted to two human children by the Tywyth Teg. In one version, following a battle between the Tywyth Teg and the Gwyllion (night spirits), two of the Tywyth Teg are killed. Two human children happen upon the procession of the fallen warrior's funeral but instead of being unwelcome, the two children are presented with the deceased steeds. Corgis are said to have played the role of war horses for fairies before they became herding dogs for humans. At the base of the haunches of Corgis, there is a line of slightly rougher fur called the fairy saddle.

== Activities ==
Pembroke Welsh Corgis can compete in dog agility trials, obedience, showmanship, flyball, tracking, and herding events. Herding instincts and trainability can be measured at noncompetitive herding tests. Corgis, despite their dwarfism giving the illusion of small slow legs, can reach up to 25 mph if they are healthy and fit. This is because Corgis tend to use more upper body strength to run than most dogs, giving them enhanced abilities with such activities as agility and herding and racing.

== Royal corgis ==
At a young age, the Queen's passion for this breed started when her father, King George VI, brought home their first royal corgi who was later named Dookie. The Queen ceased breeding corgis around 2012 so as not to leave any behind after she died; her last corgi, Willow, died in April 2018. She was gifted two new corgi pups by her family in 2021.

On 3 April 2019, the film The Queen's Corgi was released.

== See also ==
- List of dog breeds
