= Palacegarden Malachy =

GCH Palacegarden Malachy
- Other name: Malachy
- Species: Canis lupus familiaris
- Breed: Pekingese
- Sex: Male
- Born: 24 January 2008; East Berlin, Pennsylvania
- Died: 24 November 2017 (aged 9)
- Title: Best in Show at the Westminster Dog Show
- Term: 2012
- Predecessor: GCH Foxcliffe Hickory Wind (Scottish Deerhound)
- Successor: GCH Banana Joe V Tani Kazari (Affenpinscher)
- Owner: David Fitzpatrick
- Parents: Palacegarden McCafferty (sire); Palacegarden Tansy (dam)

GCH Palacegarden Malachy (24 January 2008 – 24 November 2017), also known as Malachy, was a male Pekingese who was named Best in Show at the Westminster Kennel Club Dog Show in 2012 after reaching the Best in Show round in 2011. He was also the second ranked dog in the United States in 2011.

== Show career ==
Malachy won his Best of Breed category for the first time in 2011. He went on to win the Toy Group as well, qualifying for the Best in Show round. However he lost out on the Best in Show title to Scottish Deerhound Foxcliffe Hickory Wind.

Entering Westminster once more in 2012, he again won both his breed and the Toy Group (the runner up, an Affenpinscher named Banana Joe V Tani Kazari, was also the 2011 runner-up for the Toy Group, but would become famous as the following year's Best in Show). A series of upsets in breed judging prevented a number of early favourites from joining Malachy in the later rounds. These eliminations included the Cocker Spaniel Casablanca's Thrilling Seduction, a.k.a. "Beckham", who was the number one dog in America during 2011. He went into the Best in Show round as the favorite for the title, with odds of 6–1.

He was judged Best in Show over the other dogs on display by judge Cindy Vogels. His prize was a silver bowl, but no prize money. Vogels said of the dog, "He’s a super dog who had a stupendous night".

Malachy was a crowd favorite during the judging. But following Malachy's win a large volume of negative commentary was posted online on Twitter, where viewers felt that the other dogs in the Best in Show round were robbed. In addition, he was compared to a troll doll, a mop, a wookiee, and Nicole "Snooki" Polizzi from TV show Jersey Shore.

The Westminster 2012 title was the 115th Best in Show title won by Malachy, and his last. He is to retire to live with David Fitzpatrick, his co-owner and handler. Malachy's grandson Wasabi won Best in Show at the 2021 Westminster Kennel Club dog show with David Fitzpatrick.

== See also ==
- List of Best in Show winners of the Westminster Kennel Club Dog Show
