= Gabriel Rangel =

Professional Dog Handler

Gabriel Rangel is a professional dog handler and master dog groomer. He has shown three dogs awarded Best in Show at the Westminster Kennel Club Dog Show: King, a Wire Fox Terrier, in 2019; Sky, also a Wire Fox Terrier, in 2014; and Sadie, a Scottish Terrier, in 2010. Rangel is now one win behind Peter Green, who won Best in Show as a handler four times.

Rangel specializes in the Terrier Group, Giant Schnauzers, Bouvier des Flandres, and Bichons.

Rangel was born in Mexico and now lives in Rialto, California, with his wife, Ivonne, who is also a profession dog handler and groomer. Rangel's success in this industry has attracted dog handlers and master groomers from around the globe to seek internships and the opportunity to learn his trade secrets.
