= Banana Joe V Tani Kazari =

Toy Affenpinscher dog and championship winner

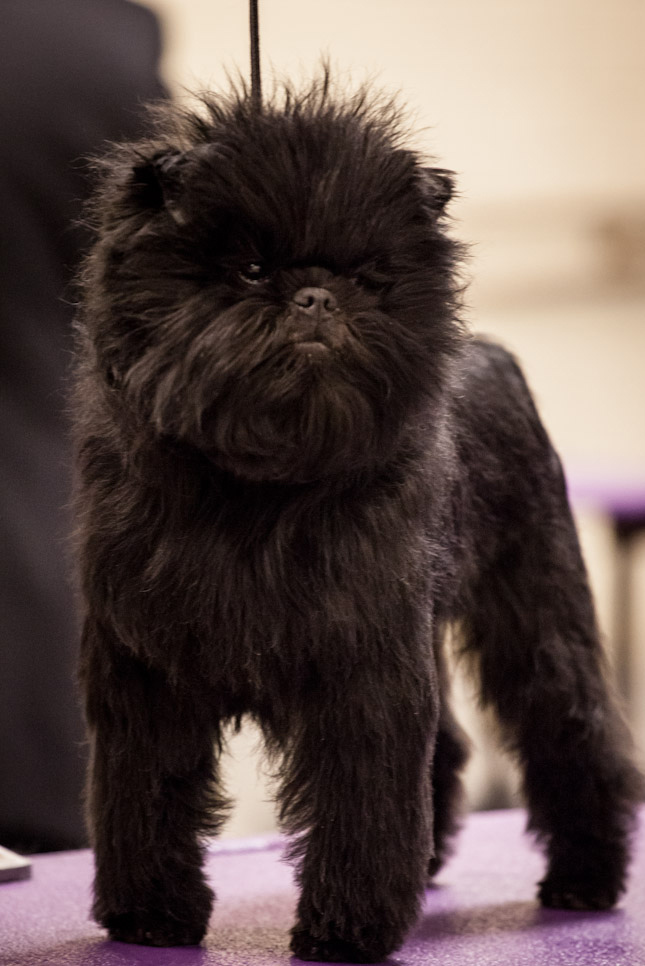
- Banana Joe V Tani Kazari at the 2013 Westminster Kennel Club Dog Show
- Other name: Joe
- Species: Dog
- Breed: Affenpinscher
- Sex: Male
- Born: March 30, 2007 (age 19)
- Title: Best in Show at the Westminster Dog Show
- Term: 2013
- Predecessor: GCH Palacegarden Malachy (Pekingese)
- Owners: Zoila Truesdale & Mieke Cooymans
- Parents: Kyleakin Space Cowboy (sire); Bling Bling V Tani Kazari (dam)
- Appearance: Black coat

GCH Banana Joe V Tani Kazari, also known as Joe (born 2007), is a 19 year old toy Affenpinscher that won Best In Show at the 137th Westminster Kennel Club Dog Show on February 12, 2013. Banana Joe was the first of his breed to win Best in Show at Madison Square Garden. This was his last show, and following it Joe went home to the Netherlands to be with his owner Mieke Cooijmans.

== Biography ==
The Affenpinscher Banana Joe V Tani Kazari was born on March 30, 2007. He was sired by Kyleakin Space Cowboy to Bling Bling V Tani Kazari. He was bred by Mieke Cooymans, and co-owned by Cooymans and Zoila Truesdale. Joe has been taught commands in English, Dutch, Spanish and German.

In 2010, he reached the Best in Show round at the 2010 National Dog Show. After being entered into the Westminster Kennel Club dog show in 2011, Joe went on to be named best of breed for Affenpinschers for the first time at the show. He qualified for the Toy Group judging round next, and placed second in the group against the Pekingese GCH Palacegarden Malachy. Later in 2011, Joe won back to back Best in Show titles at the Trenton Kennel Club in New Jersey over the course of a single weekend. He also once again won the Toy Group and reached the Best in Show round at the National Dog Show, but was beaten by the Wire Fox Terrier GCH Steele Your Heart.

A similar situation to the result of the 2011 Westminster occurred the following year. Joe again won best of breed and qualified for the Toy Group round. Again he was beaten into second place by Malachy, who went on to win Best in Show. He reached the Best in Show round of the Detroit Kennel Club, with the American Foxhound Ch Kiarry's Pandora's Box taking the title. At the National Capital Kennel Club those roles were reversed, with Joe winning Best in Show and Pandora's Box placed in reserve. He also repeated his success at the National Dog Show, and for the third year in a row, he reached the Best in Show round. Joe was also best of breed at Crufts in 2012.

In 2013 at Westminster, Joe won the Toy group for the first time. He went into the Best in Show round against Ch Kiarry's Pandora's Box, the Bichon Frise GCH Vogelflight's Honor To Pillowtalk, the Old English Sheepdog Bugaboo's Picture Perfect, the German Wirehaired Pointer GCH Mt View's Ripsnortersilvercharm, the Portuguese Water Dog GCH Claircreek Impression De Matisse, and the Smooth Fox Terrier GCH Slyfox Sneak's A Peek. Mt View's Ripsnortersilvercharm was the number one ranked dog in America during 2012, while Banana Joe was ranked fifth. The only other dog in the Best in Show round to be ranked in the top ten in America during 2012 was Kiarry's Pandora's Box, who was ranked eighth. Meanwhile, Bugaboo's Picture Perfect was a relative newcomer to the world of show dogs and a surprise entrant in the Best in Show round as Westminster 2013 was only his fourth dog show.

Handler Ernesto Lara led him around the ring for Best in Show, the first time he had reached that stage at Westminster. He was awarded Best in Show, with Bugaboo's Picture Perfect as runner up. Judge Michael Dougherty later explained his decision saying, "He was presented in immaculate manner, he was on the minute he walked in... He’s in perfect condition, perfect body." Joe's owners were awarded the silver bowl, and afterwards announced his retirement from competition. The victory was Joe's 86th Best in Show title, the first for his breed, and is returning to the Netherlands with owner Mieke Cooijmans after the show.
