= Choo-tai of Egham =

Champion show dog

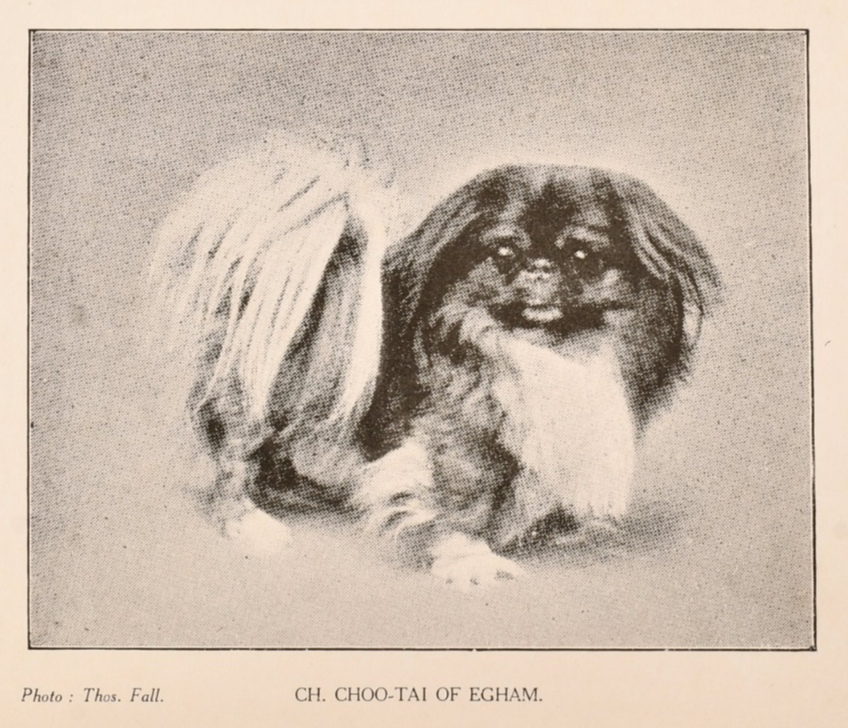
- Champion Pekingese dog and Best in Show Crufts Winner Choo-Tai of Egham
- Species: Canis lupus familiaris
- Breed: Pekingese
- Died: 1913
- Title: Best Champion at Crufts (1913)
- Predecessor: Ch. The Pride of Sussex (St. Bernard)
- Successor: Sh Ch. St. Blaise (Greyhound)
- Owner: Miss Violet Ashton Cross

Choo-tai of Egham, was a Pekingese dog that won Best Champion at Cruft's dog show in 1913 before he was poisoned to death later that year.

== Show career ==
Choo-tai of Egham was owned by Miss Violet Ashton Cross, and lived with her at Lea House, Egham. At the Aylesbury and District Canine Society Show in October 1912, Choo-tai was named the best Pekingese in a category sponsored by the Pekingese Club of Great Britain. He was subsequently named the second-best dog in the show of any variety.

The dog was named the Best Champion at the Cruft's dog show in 1913. The dog was well known for being named the best dog in a variety of shows across the country, during the course of his two-year-long show career it won more than 200 prizes. At one point, Miss Ashton Cross refused an offer of £1,500 to purchase him.

== Death ==
At the Southampton dog show in 1913, Choo-tai was again named the best dog in the show. Choo-tai's caretaker, Miss Ashton Cross, got a warning before the show that Choo-tai might be poisoned. After the dog show judges had finished their evaluation, Choo-tai returned to his pen and became sick over the following days. He died three days afterward.

In the aftermath of Choo-tai's death, suspicions arose that someone had planted a poisonous piece of liver in Choo-tai's pen. A toy spaniel was also killed in a similar manner at the show. Ashton Cross placed a £100 reward for information on Choo-tai's death. A doctor said that it would have taken a skilled practitioner to apply the correct dosage of poison.
