= Positive control =

Positive control may refer to:

- Positive control group in scientific experiments
- Positive control, the air traffic control practice of controlling aircraft whose positions are determined by direct radar observation
- Positive control in dog handling: affirmative physical or non-physical control of a dog (as in using proper leash handling technique or having successfully trained a dog with vocal commands by operant conditioning).
- Positive train control, an American form of automatic train protection
