= Looty (dog) =

Pekingese dog owned by Queen Victoria and acquired from Beijing, China

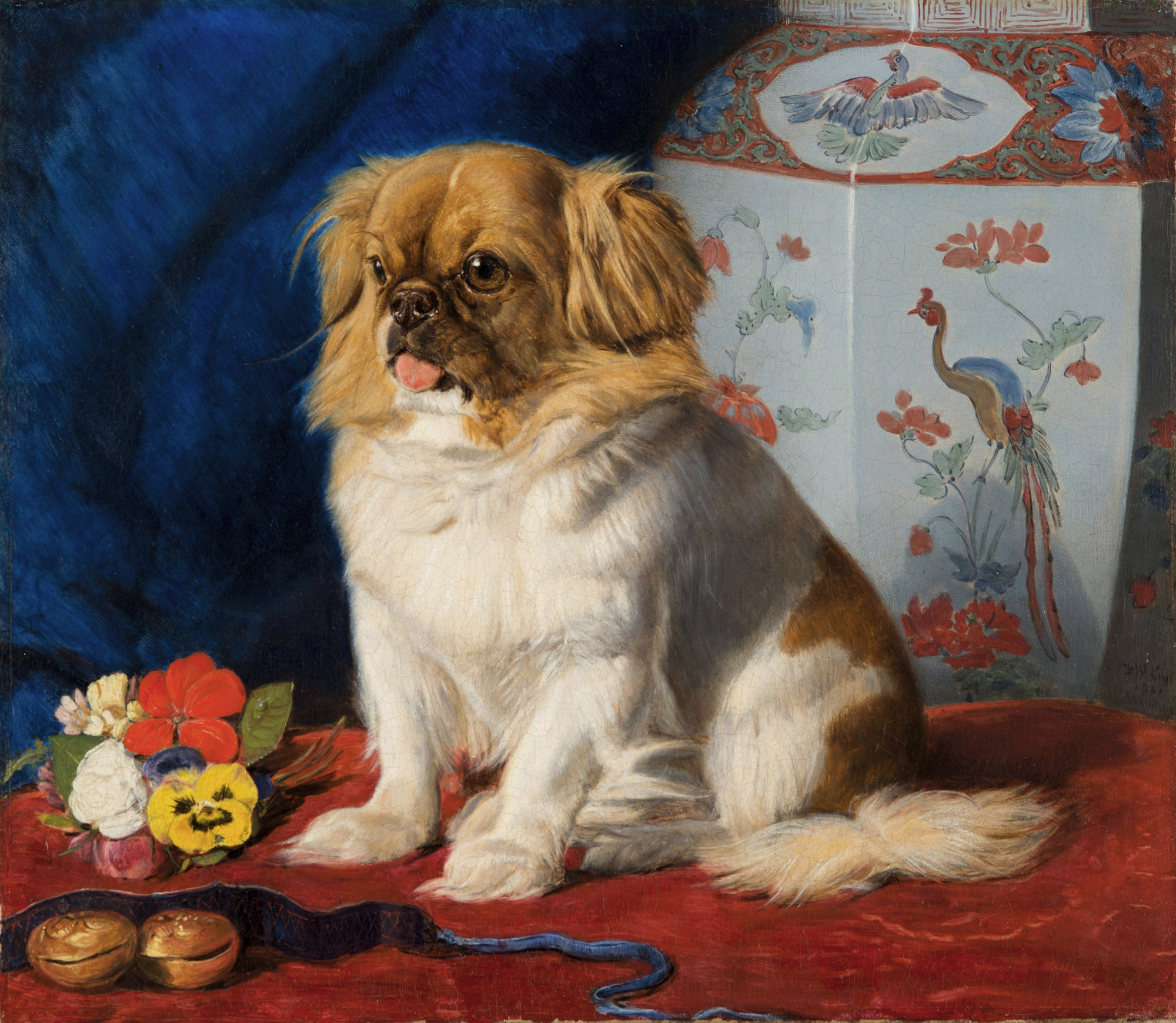
- A painting of Looty by Friedrich Wilhelm Keyl (1861)
- Other name: Lootie
- Breed: Pekingese
- Sex: female
- Born: (Before 1860); China
- Died: 2 March 1872; England
- Known for: Queen Victoria's Royal Collection of Dogs
- Owner: Queen Victoria
- Residence: Windsor Castle

Looty or Lootie was a female Pekingese dog acquired by Captain John Hart Dunne during the looting of the Old Summer Palace (near Beijing) in October of 1860. He presented her to Queen Victoria for the Royal Collection of Dogs, who named her Looty or Lootie in reference to how she was acquired. Looty may have been the first Pekingese dog to arrive in England.

== Kidnapping ==
During the Second Opium War in October 1860, British and French forces looted the Old Summer Palace (Yuanmingyuan) near Peking (modern Beijing). British Captain John Hart Dunne came across a small Pekingese dog. He later recorded the event in his diary:

"I have been able to retain a good many trifles that I bought there [The French camp], also a pretty little dog, smaller than any King Charles, a real Chinese sleeve dog. It has silver bells round its neck. People say [he added], it is the most perfect little beauty they have ever seen."

Dunne brought it back to England by sea, letting it sleep in his forage cap. It is said to have been the first Pekingese to survive the voyage and arrive in Britain, however this is disputed.

== Life in England ==
Dunne presented the dog to Queen Victoria in 1861, writing that:

This little dog was found by me in the Palace of Yuan-Ming-Yuan near Pekin on 6 October 1860. It is supposed to have belonged to either the Empress or one of the ladies of the Imperial Family. It is a most affectionate and intelligent little creature – it has always been accustomed to be treated as a pet and it was with the hope that it might be looked upon as such by Her Majesty and the Royal Family that I have brought it from China.

Her Majesty was graciously pleased to accept the dog. She named it Looty or Lootie in reference to how it was acquired.

Looty was "considered by every one who has seen it the smallest and by far the most beautiful little animal that has appeared in this country."

Her integration into the Royal household was not without problems. Dunne had given instruction that she was a fastidious and delicate eater, and would accept only rice and chicken. These were commonplace in China and the Royal Court there. However the British instead offered her their standard dog food, primarily beef and offal. These were ingredients that the Chinese court would have regarded with horror and she would not have recognised as food.

Following Keyl's painting of her portrait, Looty was taken to the main kennels at Windsor Castle and lived there for the rest of its life. There, she became more of a curiosity than the pet which Dunne had hoped for. The Queen herself took little account of her gift, having other more favoured dogs which she kept with her.

In 1912, Harper's Weekly described the dog:

... He [sic] was a very lonely little creature, the other dogs taking exception to his Oriental habits and appearance, and when the Prince and Princess of Wales returned from a Continental trip the latter pleaded with her mother-in-law to be allowed to take Looty to Sandringham.

Looty died at Windsor Castle on 2 March 1872. Unlike many of the queen's dogs, her grave is unmarked.

== Depictions ==
Queen Victoria commissioned a painting of the dog by Friedrich Wilhelm Keyl in 1861, a copy of which was given to Captain Dunne. William Bambridge captured a few photographs of the dog in 1865, including one of Looty asleep on an ornate chair, which remains in the Royal Collection Trust. Another showed Looty lying on a footstool.

== Historic significance ==
Modern critics have described Looty the dog as symbolic of British imperialism. At the time, naming it "Looty" was seen as appropriate to its status. The flippancy in choosing this name is symptomatic of how normalized and socially acceptable the looting of foreign nations was still considered at the time.

== See also ==
- List of individual dogs
