= Foxcliffe Hickory Wind =

Ch. Foxcliffe Hickory Wind
- Other name: Hickory
- Species: Canis lupus familiaris
- Breed: Scottish Deerhound
- Sex: Female
- Born: December 20, 2005; Flint Hill, Rappahannock County, Virginia
- Died: June 13, 2017 (aged 11)
- Title: Best in Show at the Westminster Dog Show
- Term: 2011
- Predecessor: Ch. Roundtown Mercedes of Maryscot (Scottish Terrier)
- Successor: GCH Palacegarden Malachy (Pekingese)
- Owner: Sally Sweatt
- Parents: Thistleglen Newell (sire); Foxcliffe Summoning Charms (dam)

GCH Foxcliffe Hickory Wind (December 20, 2005 – June 13, 2017), also known as Hickory, was a female Scottish Deerhound who was named Best in Show at the Westminster Kennel Club Dog Show in 2011. She was the first of her breed to have won the title.

== Biography ==
GCH Foxcliffe Hickory Wind was named after a song written by Gram Parsons and Bob Buchanan. She was owned by Sally Sweatt, along with her breeder, Cecilia Dove, and her husband Scott. During 2010, she was ranked fifth out of all American dogs in the Hound Group.

Following her victory at Westminster, she retired from show competition. Her owners made plans to breed her in 2011 and move her permanently to her breeder's farm in Flint Hill, Virginia. Speaking of Hickory's retirement, her handler Angela Lloyd said, "She's a wonderful dog to live with. I’m going to miss the nose nudge in the middle of the night." Hickory died, aged 11 years, on June 13, 2017.

== Westminster ==
Being handled by Angela Lloyd, who won the junior competition in 1998, she was entered in the 135th Westminster Kennel Club Dog Show in 2011. In her breed judging, she was judged the best of three entrants who had qualified for Westminster, moving onto the Hound Group, the other two entrants being GCH Thistleglen Rowan and Ch. Altnamara's Trial By Fire.

She placed first in the Hound Group, beating the Beagle GCH Torquay Midnight Confession into second place, and the Norwegian Elkhound GCH Vin-Melca's Voyager into third.

She won the title of Best in Show in what was described by the Los Angeles Times as "surprising many", beating four dogs which were ranked in the top ten of all breeds in 2010: the Pekingese GCH Palacegarden Malachy, the Cocker Spaniel GCH Casablanca's Thrilling Seduction, the Bearded Collie GCH Tolkien Raintree Mister Baggins, and the Smooth Fox Terrier GCH Slyfox Sneak's A Peek. Her odds prior to winning Best in Show were placed at 60–1. However, these were not the longest odds of a recent Best in Show winner; in 2009, a Sussex Spaniel named Ch. Clussexx Three D Grinchy Glee came out of retirement to win at odds of 275–1.

Paolo Dondina, the Best in Show judge and first Italian to judge the prize, said of Hickory, "This one feels perfectly the standard in all the ways, I am a hound person. I had Afghans, I had whippets, I had Irish wolfhounds. I never owned a deerhound. This is my dream." During the press conference following the victory, Hickory grew tired and restless of the photographers, and at one point walked off the stage. As Best in Show, she appeared on The Today Show and The Martha Stewart Show.

At Westminster, GCH Foxcliffe Hickory Wind became the first ever of her breed (Scottish Deerhound) to capture the Best in Show award.

== See also ==
- List of Best in Show winners of the Westminster Kennel Club Dog Show
