= John Hart Dunne =

British soldier of Irish descent

John Hart Dunne K.C.B. (1835–1924) was a British soldier of Irish descent, who served in several major campaigns of the nineteenth century.

John Hart Dunne was born in Cartrun, County Roscommon, Ireland, in 1835.

In 1852, Dunne was commissioned into the 62nd Regiment of the British Army. Two years later he was transferred to the 21st Regiment. He served in the Crimean War where he saw action at the battles of Alma, Balaclava and Inkerman and at the Siege of Sevastopol.

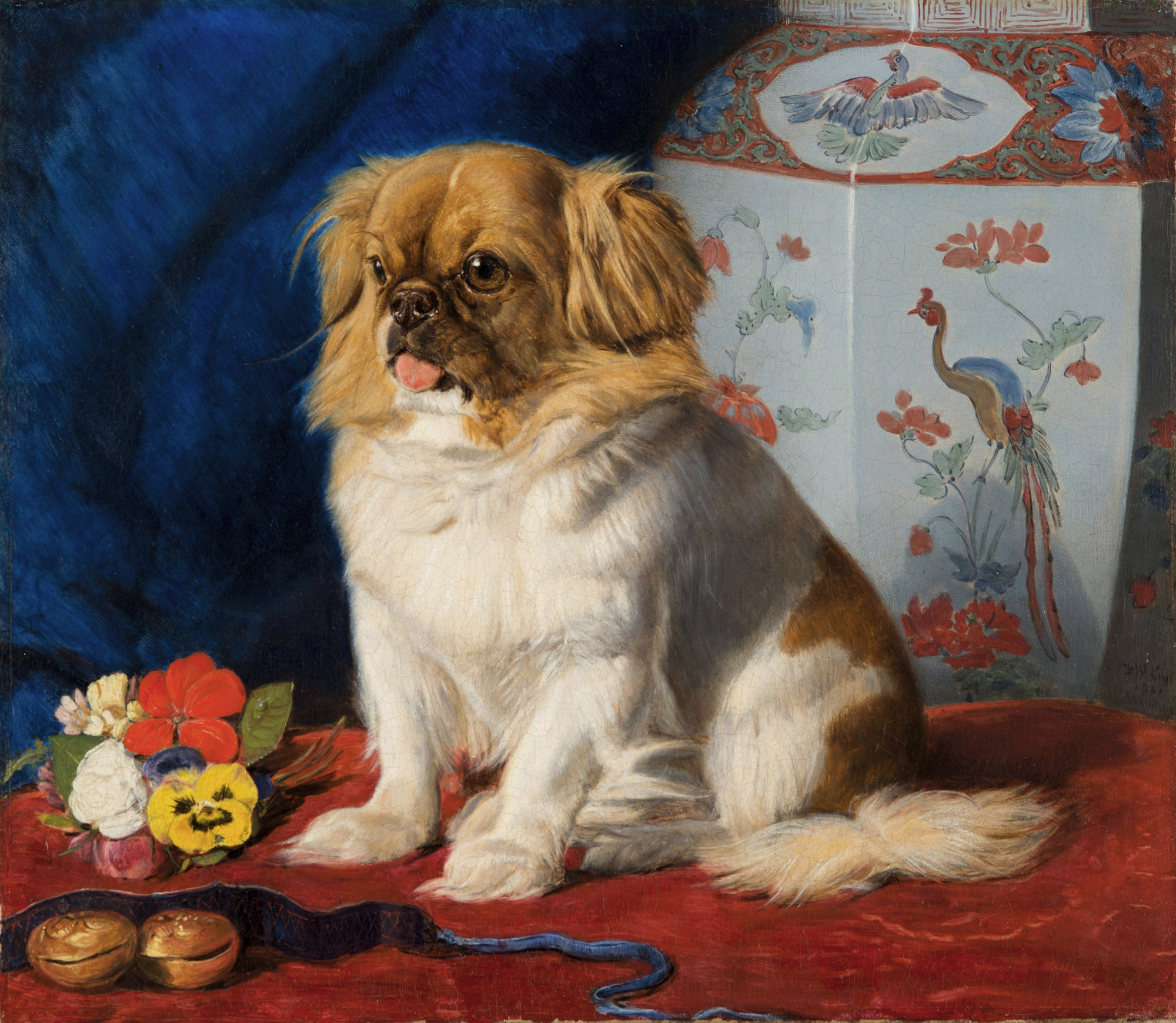
Looty (1861) by Friedrich Wilhelm Keyl, in the Royal Collection.

In 1855 he was promoted to captain and served in the 99th Regiment of Foot in India. It was with this unit that he participated in the notorious Second Opium War with China in 1860. As part of the plunder gained during the ransacking of the Summer Palace, five lapdogs were seized. In April 1861, Captain Dunne gifted one of these dogs, Looty, to Queen Victoria for the Royal Collection of dogs. Dunne thus became credited with the introduction of Pekinese dogs into Britain. A picture of Looty was painted for the Queen by Friedrich Wilhelm Keyl. Dunne also received a replica of the picture.

Further promotion followed; In 1865 Lieutenant-Colonel, 1881 Major-General, 1889 Lieutenant-General, and 1893 General. Final appointments included; 1894 Lieutenancy of the Tower of London and 1898 Colonel of the Duke of Edinburgh’s Wiltshire Regiment.

His eldest son was the aeronautical engineer, philosopher and fly-fisherman, John William Dunne (1875-1949).

General Sir John Hart Dunne, K.C.B. died on 20 April 1924, and is buried in Sidmouth, Devon.

== Works ==
- Dunne, John Hart. 1861. From Calcutta to Pekin, being notes taken from the journal of an officer between those places. London: S. Low, Son and Co.

== Arms ==
Coat of arms of John Hart Dunne
Notes Confirmed by Sir Arthur Vicars, Ulster King of Arms, 20 July 1907. Crest On a wreath of the colours on a mount Vert a newt passant Or in front of an oak tree Proper pendent from a branch on the dexter side thereof by a riband of the second an escutcheon Azure charged with an eagle as in the arms. Escutcheon Azure an eagle displayed Or a bordure invected of the last charged with eight trefoils slipped of the field. Motto Mullaher
