= Rocky Top's Sundance Kid =

American show dog

Ch. Rocky Top's Sundance Kid
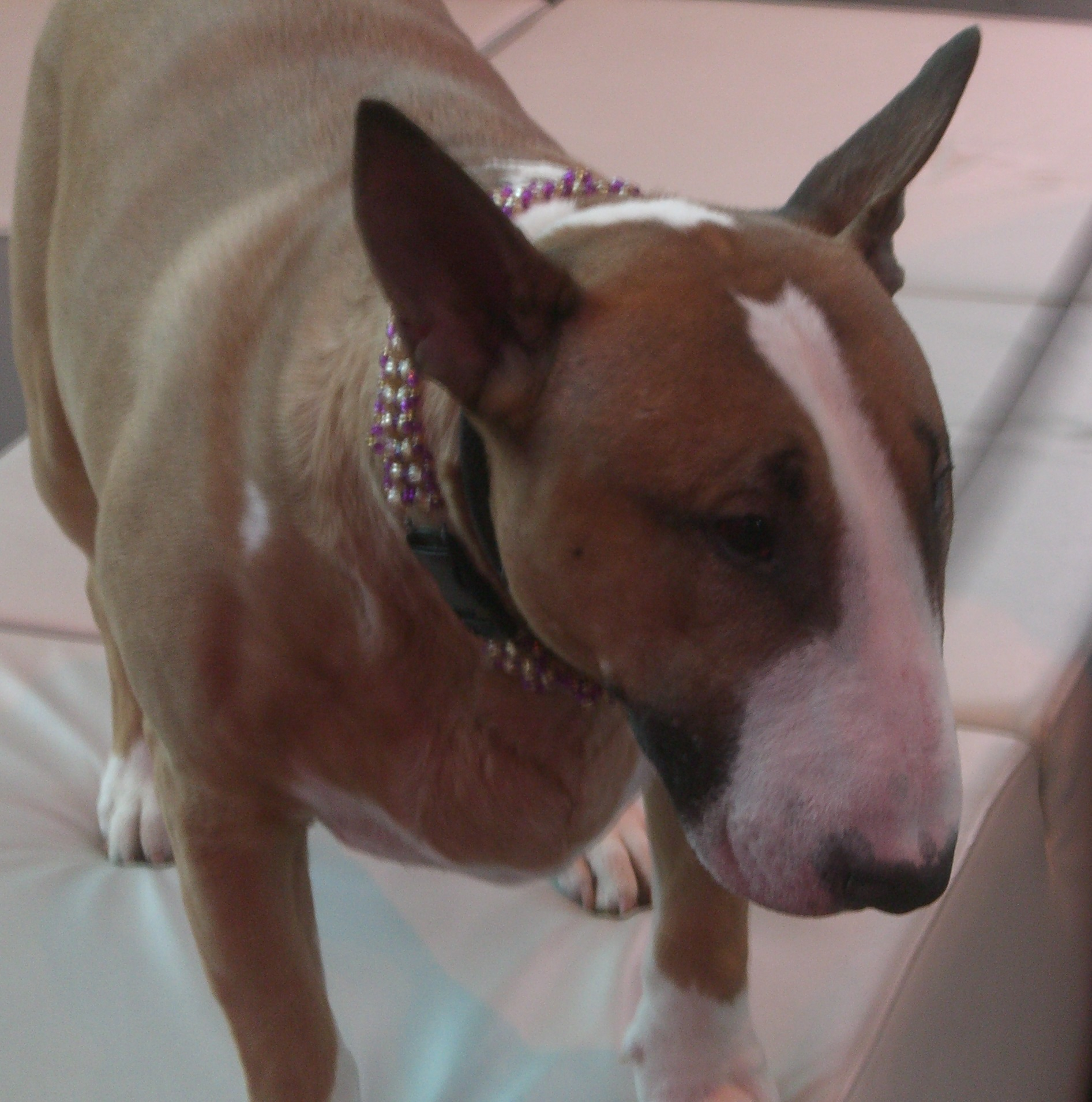
- Rocky Top's Sundance Kid visiting the Bloomberg building in New York City
- Other name: Rufus
- Species: Canis lupus familiaris
- Breed: Bull Terrier
- Sex: Male
- Born: April 8, 2000
- Died: August 9, 2012 (aged 12)
- Occupation: Show dog therapy dog
- Title: Best In Show at the Westminster Dog Show
- Term: 2006–2007
- Predecessor: Ch. Kan-Point's VJK Autumn Roses (German Shorthaired Pointer)
- Successor: Ch. Felicity's Diamond Jim (English Springer Spaniel)
- Owners: Barbara and Tom Bishop
- Parents: Sire: Ch. Einstein The Joker; Dam: Ch. Rocky Tops Ulster Annie
- Awards: 35 Best in Show awards AKC Award for Canine Excellence

Ch. Rocky Top's Sundance Kid, also known as Rufus, (April 8, 2000 – August 9, 2012) was a Bull Terrier who is best known for being the 2006 Best In Show winner at the Westminster Dog Show handled by Kathy Kirk PHA. He is the first Colored Bull Terrier to win Best in Show at Westminster, with the only other victory for his breed going to a White Bull Terrier in 1918. He also won Best In Show at the National Dog show, and on retirement trained as a therapy dog. He is the most successful Colored Bull Terrier show dog of all time.

== Early life ==
Rufus' sire was Einstein the Joker, whose most notable win was for becoming the youngest Bull Terrier World Champion at the World Dog Show in 1995.

He lived with his owners, Barbara and Tom Bishop, since he was 10 weeks old.

== Show history ==
By the age of thirteen and a half month, Rufus had earned his Championship title and Register of Merit.

In 2005 Rufus won Best in Show at The National Dog Show, hosted by The Kennel Club of Philadelphia.

Also in 2005 Rufus won Best In Show at the Morris & Essex Kennel Club Dog Show, and 1st in the terrier Group at the Eukanuba Championship dog show in 2005.

In judging for Best in Show at Westminster, Rufus was joined by a Golden Retriever (Ch. Chuckanut Party Favour O' Nove), a Dalmatian (Ch. Merry Go Round Mach Ten), a Rottweiler (Ch. Carter's Noble Shaka Zulu), a Scottish Deerhound, a Pug (Ch. Kendoric's Riversong Mulroney) and an Old English Sheepdog. Of all the breeds being judged, only the Pug and the Sheepdog had previously won Best in Show. Judging was conducted by James Reynolds, with the crowd favouring the Golden Retriever. The Dalmatian was owned by Dick and Linda Stark who also own the German Shorthaired Pointer Ch. Kan-Point's VJK Autumn Roses, who won the previous year's Best in Show. When the judge announced the winner, it seemed like an upset, although the terrier group is the most successful at Westminster. On winning, Rufus became the first Colored Bull Terrier to take the title, with the only other Bull Terrier to take the title being Ch. Haymarket Faultless, a White Bull Terrier, in 1918. Speaking of Rufus, judge James Reynolds described him as "The classic profile of a colored bull terrier." Following his win, owner Barbara Bishop announced his retirement from the show ring.

Rufus retired as the most successful Colored Bull Terrier of all time, with 35 all breed Best in Shows, 135 Best in Group firsts and the BTCA National Speciality on three occasions.

== Retirement and death ==
After winning at Westminster, Rufus was presented with a proclamation by the Monmouth County Board of Freeholders at a meeting in Freehold, New Jersey.

Following his retirement, Rufus retrained as a therapy dog, visiting schools, nursing homes and senior citizen programs. Rufus starred on the Animal Planet television series Dogs 101. In 2010, he was one of the winners at the 11th AKC Humane Fund Awards Award for Canine Excellence (ACE).

Rufus died on August 9, 2012, aged 12 years.
