= Roundtown Mercedes of Maryscot =

GCH Roundtown Mercedes of Maryscot
- Other name: Sadie
- Species: Canis lupus familiaris
- Breed: Scottish Terrier
- Sex: Female
- Born: 2 April 2005; Mackinac Island, Michigan
- Died: 13 August 2014 (aged 9); California
- Occupation: Show dog
- Title: Best in Show at the Westminster Kennel Club Dog Show
- Term: 2010
- Predecessor: Ch. Clussexx Three D Grinchy Glee (Sussex Spaniel)
- Successor: GCH Foxcliffe Hickory Wind (Scottish Deerhound)
- Owners: Amelia and Dan Musser
- Parents: Ch. Anstamm Like A Rock (father); Ch. Maryscot Painted Black (mother)

GCH Roundtown Mercedes of Maryscot (2 April 2005 - 13 August 2014), also known as Sadie, was a Scottish Terrier from Mackinac Island in the U.S. state of Michigan.

== Biography ==
Sadie was named the 2010 Best in Show winner at the Westminster Kennel Club Dog Show. This made her the first Triple Crown winner; she also won the National Dog Show in November 2009 and the AKC National Championship in December 2009.

Sadie's owners were Amelia and Dan Musser, and her handlers were Gabriel and Ivonne Rangel. Sadie's father and littermates were all named after cars.

Sadie died on 13 August 2014, at the home of her handlers in Rialto, California, following complications from surgery.

== See also ==
- List of Best in Show winners of the Westminster Kennel Club Dog Show
- List of individual dogs
