= Affenpinscher =

German breed of dog

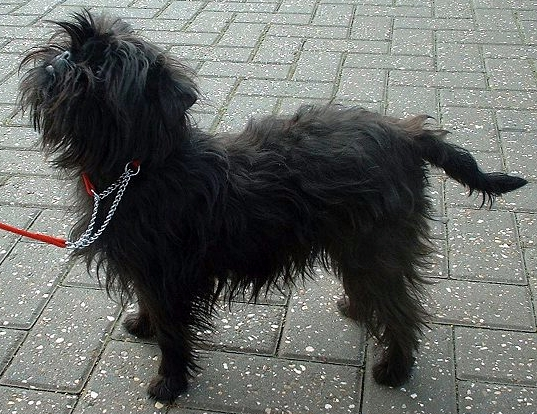
- Origin: Germany
Traits
- Height: 25–30 cm (10–12 in)
- Weight: 4–6 kg (10–15 lb)
- Coat: wire-haired
- Colour: black
Kennel club standards
- VDH: standard
- American Kennel Club: standard
- Fédération Cynologique Internationale: standard

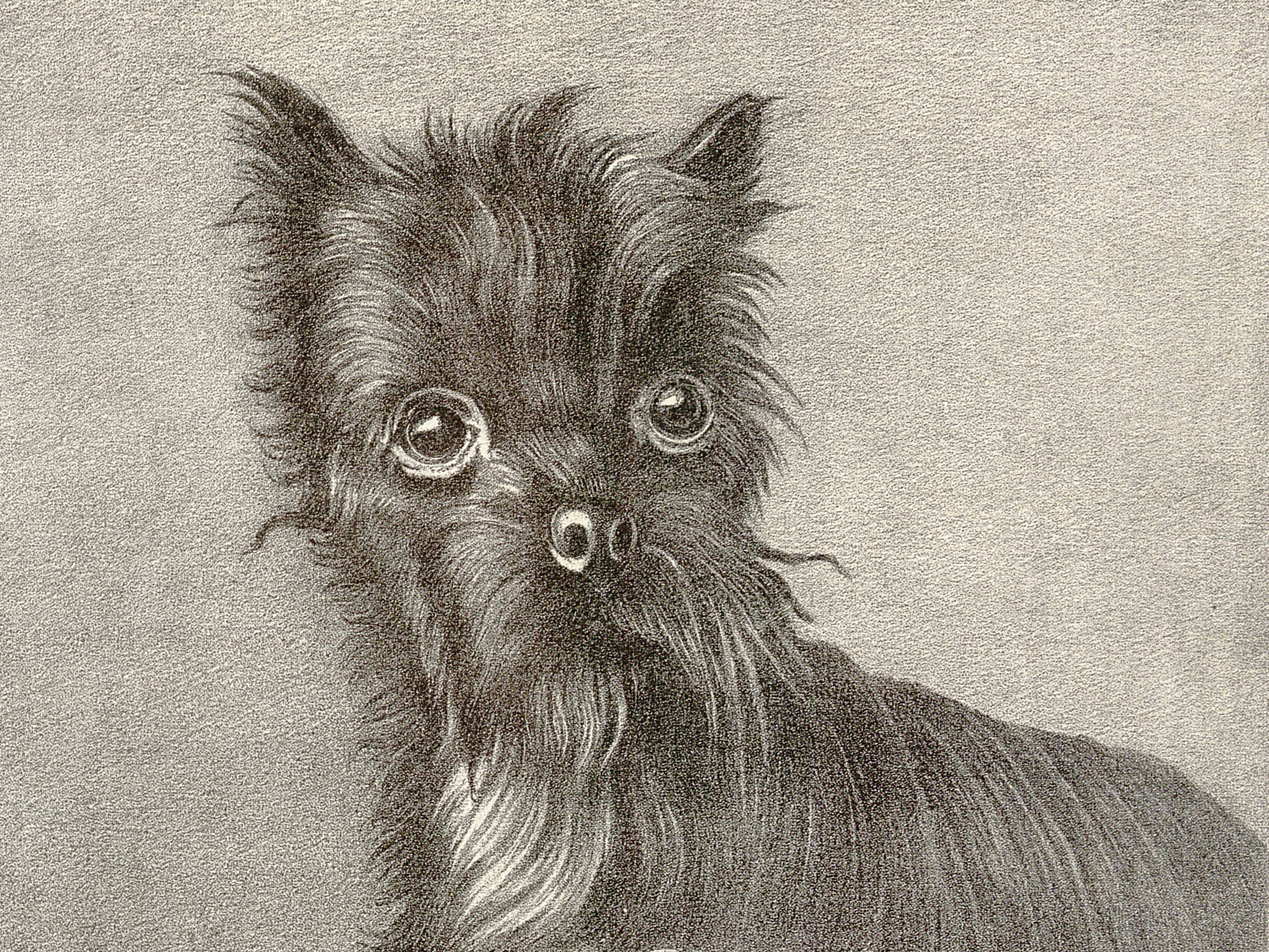
"Zwergaffenpintscher", detail of illustration by Jean Bungartz in his Illustrirtes Muster Hunde-Buch, 1890

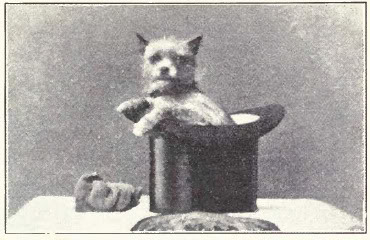
Photograph from about 1915

The Affenpinscher (Note: German: [ˈafn̩ˌpɪnʃɐ]) is a German breed of small toy dog of Pinscher type. It was formerly kept as a farm or stable dog to catch mice and rats; in the twenty-first century it is commonly kept as a companion animal.

== History ==
The word 'Affenpinscher' derives from Affe, German for 'ape' or 'monkey'; it is sometimes translated as 'Monkey Terrier', although the dog is a Pinscher and not a terrier.

The origins of the Pinscher group of dogs are unknown. Dogs of this type, both rough-haired and smooth-haired, were traditionally kept as carriage dogs or as stable dogs, and so were sometimes known as Stallpinscher; they were capable ratters. Until the late nineteenth century, both rough-haired and smooth-haired types were known as Deutscher Pinscher, and came from the same lineage; puppies of both types could occur in the same litter.

In 1880 the Pinscher was recorded in the Deutschen Hundestammbuch of the Verein zur Veredelung der Hunderassen. The animal illustrator Jean Bungartz included an illustration of the "Zwergaffenpintscher" in his Kynos: Handbuch zur Beurteilung der Racen-Reinheit des Hundes in 1884, and also in his Illustrirtes Muster Hunde-Buch in 1890. In 1895 Ludwig Beckmann described five varieties of Pinscher – the rough- and smooth-haired Pinscher, the rough- and smooth-haired Miniature Pinscher, and the Affenpinscher. In 1895 a breed society, the Pinscher-Schnauzer-Klub, was established for both types, both rough- and smooth-haired. The first volume of its stud-book was published in 1902; fourteen Affenpinschers were listed.

The Affenpinscher was recognised by the American Kennel Club in 1936, and was definitely accepted by the Fédération Cynologique Internationale in 1955.

The number of new registrations in Germany is very low: in the fifteen years from 2010 to 2024, annual registrations averaged just under 21, with a low of 5 and a high of 33; the total number of registrations in the period was 308, less than 0.03% of the total of 1127154 for all breeds.

== Characteristics ==
The Affenpinscher – whether dog or bitch – generally weighs from 4 to 6 kg and stands some 25 to 30 cm at the withers. It has a harsh rough coat when it is not clipped, but if clipped it can be softer and fluffier. It has a notable monkey-like expression (affe is German for monkey). Its coat is shaggier over the head and shoulders, forming a mane, with a shorter coat over the back and hind quarters. It is harsh and wiry in texture when properly maintained. The Fédération Cynologique Internationale and British Kennel Club breed standards specify that the coat must be black, but the American Kennel Club also allows grey, silver, red, black and tan, and beige (a mixture of red, brown, black and white hairs).

Affenpinschers have a distinct appearance that some associate with terriers. However, they are part of "Group 2, Section 1: Pinschers and Schnauzers" in the FCI classification, and not the terrier group.

== Health ==
A UK study found a mean lifespan of 9.3 years for the breed, compared to an average of 12.5 for all dogs.

The dogs either do or do not have a higher-than-normal incidence of hip dysplasia. Dogs may be tested for luxating patella. There may be some hereditary predisposition to cataracts. Secondary syringomyelia associated with Chiari malformation has been observed in the breed, as has seasonal flank alopecia.

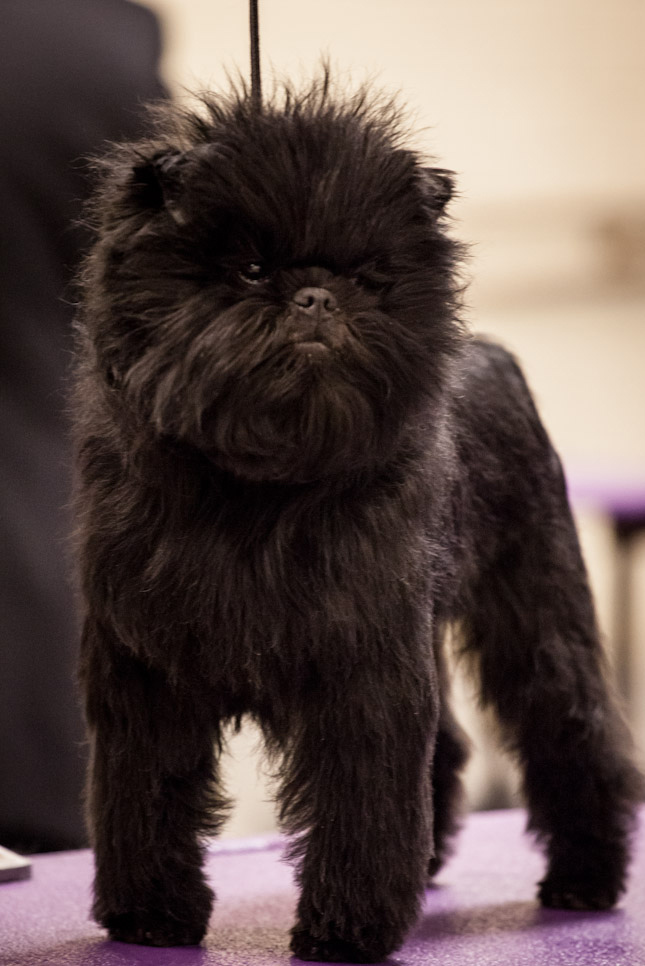
Banana Joe V Tani Kazari, best-in-show at the Westminster Kennel Club Dog Show in 2013

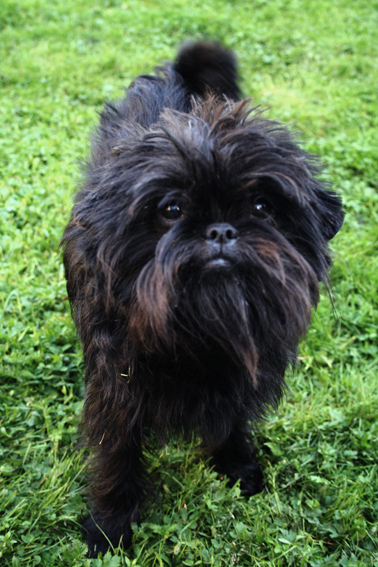
