= National Dog Show =

Major televised annual dog show in Philadelphia, PA USA

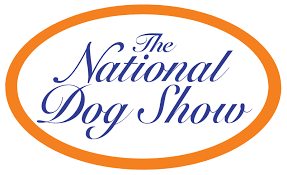
- Also known as: The National Dog Show Presented by Purina
- Genre: Dog show
- Created by: Kennel Club of Philadelphia (KCP)
- Presented by: John O'Hurley; David Frei
- Judges: Frank DePaulo (Show Chairman & Judge)
- Country of origin: United States

Production
- Production location: Greater Philadelphia Expo Center at Oaks in Oaks, Pennsylvania
- Running time: 2 hours

Original release
- Network: NBC
- Release: November 2002

The National Dog Show is an American all-breed benched conformation show sanctioned by the American Kennel Club and the Kennel Club of Philadelphia, which takes place in November each year and has been televised on NBC since 2002.

== History ==
The Kennel Club of Philadelphia Dog Show began in 1879, following a format established by a one-time dog show held at the United States centennial in 1876. The show ran annually through 1927; it resumed in 1933 and has been held every year since. The show is held by The Kennel Club of Philadelphia, a founding club of AKC. It traditionally takes place on the third from last weekend in November over two days. In 2002, NBC Sports began televising the show on Thanksgiving Day and rebranded it as The National Dog Show.

The National Dog Show is one of the three major dog shows in the United States, along with the AKC National Championship and the Westminster Dog Show. Winners may be invited to compete at Crufts. As with all AKC conformation shows, mixed-breed dogs are not eligible to participate.

The NDS is one of the last six remaining benched dog shows in the United States. The COVID-19 pandemic in 2020 caused the show to be held behind closed doors for the first time.

The first dog to win two consecutive Best in Show awards in the show's history was GCH Foxcliffe Claire Randall Fraser, a Scottish Deerhound who won Best in Show in 2020 and 2021.

=== Television history ===
A two-hour edit of the show is televised in the United States on NBC every Thanksgiving; the show airs after the network's coverage of the Macy's Thanksgiving Day Parade and airs at noon in all time zones except for Puerto Rico and the U.S. Virgin Islands which airs at 1 PM AST (due to NBC affiliates in these territories using the Eastern Time Zone feed), it also reairs every year either on the Friday or Saturday after Thanksgiving in primetime or on the Sunday Afternoon after Thanksgiving, and throughout the year on NBC Sports's free ad-supported streaming television channel NBC Sports Now. Actor John O'Hurley and American Kennel Club judge David Frei host, and the show's presenting sponsor is Nestlé Purina PetCare.

The introduction of the television showings was drawn out of inspiration from the 2000 film Best in Show. NBC had attempted to fill the slot vacated by NBC's loss of Thanksgiving football rights four years prior; it had been airing the 1946 film It's a Wonderful Life in the time slot but found that the film was not doing well enough in the ratings to justify continuing to air it there. NBC Sports's Jon Miller noted that the family atmosphere of Thanksgiving made the dog show a perfect fit for the slot after the parade, since pets are often considered an extension of the family unit, and surmised that viewers often had a rooting interest for the breeds of dogs they owned (which Miller dubbed an "alma mater effect"). The show ranks among the most-watched television specials of the year across all networks, with 12,000,000 viewers watching the 2024 telecast, fifth among all network television specials.

== Best in Show winners ==
Year	Breed	Name	Call Name	Handler	Refs.
2001	Labrador Retriever	Gustavus Brady	Gus		
2002	Poodle(Standard)	Ale Kai Mikimoto on Fifth	Miki	Karen LeFrak	
2003	Doberman Pinscher	Blue Chip Purple Reign	Raisin		
2004	Smooth Fox Terrier	Aimhi Avalon Renaissance	Gracie		
2005	Colored Bull Terrier	Rocky Top's Sundance Kid	Rufus	Barbara Bishop	
2006	Poodle(Toy)	Smash JP Win a Victory	Vikki	Kaz Hosaka	
2007	Australian Shepherd	Buff Cap Creslane Arctic Mist	Swizzle	Nancy Gagnon	
2008	Pointer	Cookieland Seasyde Hollyberry	Holly	Sean & Tammy McCarthy	
2009	Scottish Terrier	Ch. Roundtown Mercedes of Maryscot	Sadie	Amelia Musser	
2010	Irish Setter	Windntide Mr. Sandman	Clooney	Peter Kubacz	
2011	Wire Fox Terrier	GCH Steele Your Heart	Eira	Gabriel Rangel	
2012	Wire Fox Terrier	Afterall Painting the Sky	Sky	Gabriel Rangel	
2013	American Foxhound	Gch. Kiarry's Pandora's Box	Jewel	Lisa Miller	
2014	Bloodhound	Flessner's International S’cess	Nathan	Heather Helmer	
2015	Skye Terrier	GCH CH Cragsmoor Good Time Charlie	Charlie	Larry Cornelius	
2016	Greyhound	GCHS CH Grandcru Giaconda CGC	Gia	Melanie Steele	
2017	Brussels Griffon	GCH Somerset Wynzall Hashtag	Newton	Keith Jacobson	
2018	Whippet	GCHG Pinnacle Tennessee Whiskey	Whiskey	Justin Smithey	
2019	Bulldog	GCHG Diamond Gold Majesu Pisko Bulls	Thor	Eduardo Paris	
2020	Scottish Deerhound	GCH Foxcliffe Claire Randall Fraser	Claire	Angela Lloyd	
2021	Scottish Deerhound	GCH Foxcliffe Claire Randall Fraser	Claire	Angela Lloyd	
2022	French Bulldog	GCHP Fox Canyon's I Won The War at Goldshield	Winston	Perry Payson	
2023	Sealyham Terrier	GCHP Goodspice Efbe Money Stache	Stache	Margery Good	
2024	Pug	GCHG Andi In Cahoots	Vito	Michael Scott	
2025	Belgian Sheepdog	GHCS Prairiewind’s Sxongs of Summer at La Neige	Soleil	Daniel Martin	
