= Peter Green (dog handler) =

Peter J. Green, born in Neath, Wales, is a retired professional dog show handler and a current dog show judge. He shares the record for the most Best in Show victories at the Westminster Kennel Club Dog Show, having won four times: 1968, 1977, 1994, and 1998.

Green judged Best in Show at the 2019 Westminster Kennel Club Dog Show.
