= Alopecia in animals =

Hair loss in non-human mammals

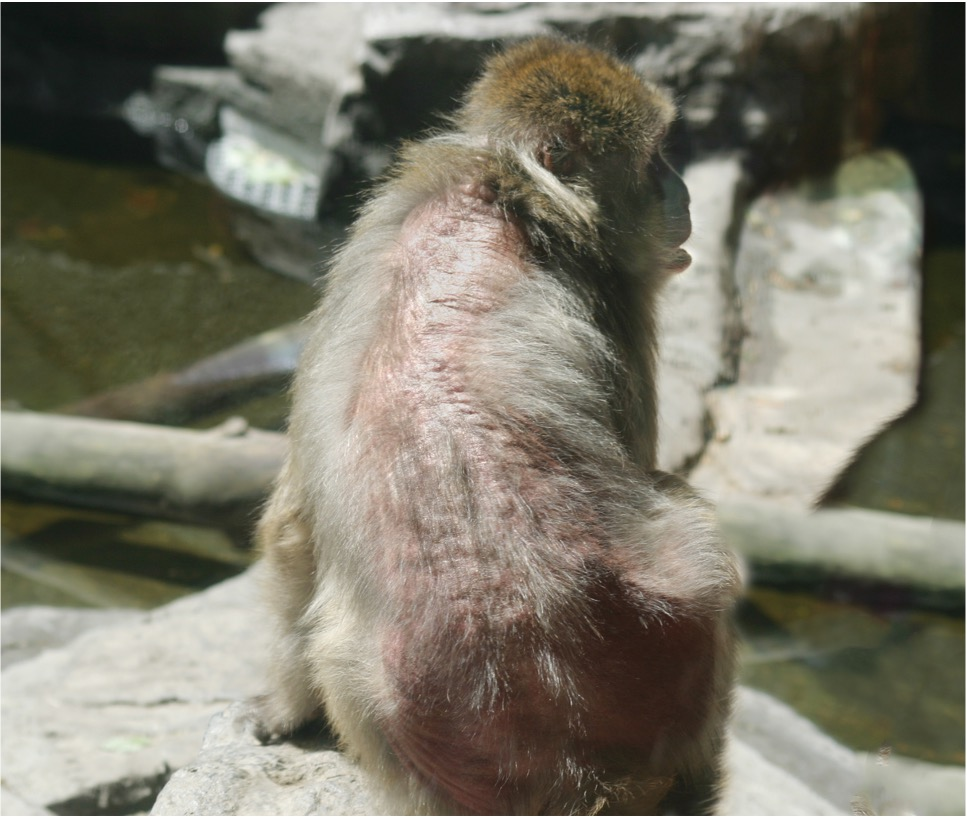
Captive Japanese macaque (Macaca fuscata) experiencing alopecia

Alopecia in animals is a condition where locations on the body surface that are typically covered in hair, contain areas where hair is absent, and is a condition that can affect other animals besides humans. Alopecia is a condition that can affect wild organisms and captive organisms, however, the condition tends to be more prominent in captive contexts. Development of alopecia in animals is usually the sign of an underlying disease. Some animals may be genetically predisposed to hair loss, while in some it may be caused by hypersensitivity or nutritional factors. These include Moluccan cockatoos, spectacled bears, hedgehogs, raccoons, squirrels, baboons, and chimpanzees since they share 98% of human genes. Others that are selectively bred to have baldness include rabbits, guinea pigs, Syrian hamsters, mice, rats, and cats. Environmental enrichment has been used in some cases to mitigate certain behaviours that cause hair loss, improve alopecia, and address welfare concerns.

Canine pinnal alopecia is most common in dachshunds, but others, such as Chihuahuas, Boston terriers, whippets and Italian greyhounds, may also be vulnerable. Certain skin conditions in animals can also cause loss of fur. Ferret adrenal disease is extremely common and is the most common cause of alopecia in ferrets, typically affecting middle-aged specimens between three and seven years old. Bacterial pyoderma, dermatophytosis, and parasites can also cause the condition. In rabbits, dermatophytosis is a prime cause of alopecia in young, newly weaned specimens. Dermatophytosis as a cause of alopecia is common in cats, too, and in long-haired varieties, dermatophytic pseudomycetomas may be to blame. Alopecia areata has been studied on mice in laboratories. In horses, human contact with the horse and the rubbing of the saddle across the mane can cause patches of hair loss.

== Causes and/or influencing factors ==
=== Diet ===
Diet and nutrition can cause and/or contribute to alopecia in animals in the wild and in captivity. For example, a lack of sufficient ingestion of a protein in the diet of a group of captive gorillas in Gabon caused various health issues including the development of alopecia. The ingestion of plants present in the wild can cause alopecia if ingested in too large a quantity. For example, the presence of mimosine, an amino acid in Leucaena leucocephala plants, has led to alopecia in ring-tailed lemurs (Lemur catta) that consume this plant in Madagascar.

=== Hormones and endocrine conditions ===
Endocrinological conditions including Cushing's syndrome (hyperadrenocorticism) and hyperthyroidism can cause localized alopecia in animals. Alopecia resulting from hyperadrenocorticism is common in dogs and presents most often in the trunk region of the animal's body. Hyperthyroidism is a second condition that can cause alopecia and in contrast to hyperadrenocorticism, regions experiencing rubbing, the joints of the limbs, and the tail tend to be the most affected regions in dogs.

=== Parasites ===
The presence of a parasitic load has been identified as a source of alopecia in both wild and captive organisms. Among the organisms observed experiencing alopecia, due to ectoparasites, in the wild are ungulates such as moose and deer. Moose in certain regions of Europe, including Norway and Sweden, have experienced alopecia due to a high parasitic load of Lipoptena cervi, also known as deer ked. A high presence of chewing lice has indirectly led to alopecia in deer by causing behavioural modifications in the host organisms. The affected individuals experienced hair loss as they spent greater amounts of time targeting affected areas while grooming. A parasite-induced dermatological disease named sarcoptic mange occurs in dogs infected with mites (Sarcoptes scabiei var canis) and alopecia is often among the main symptoms experienced by the affected individuals, alongside other lesions. This disease in dogs is contagious and thus, can be transmitted between individuals.

=== Pregnancy and post-partum ===
Alopecia has been associated with pregnancy in various animals. For example, in non-human primates, more severe or extensive alopecia has been observed in pregnant rhesus macaques (Macaca mulatta). Birth and post-partum related alopecia has also been documented in dogs.

=== Enclosure characteristics ===
Factors associated with the captive environment can influence the presence and/or extent of alopecia in animals. For example, the severity of alopecia in individuals tends to be greater in primates inhabiting smaller or exclusively interior environments. Further, alopecia is associated with enclosures where animal density is highest as it may cause stress-induced physiological or behavioural changes that can lead to hair loss. The type of material used to cover the ground of the enclosure has also mediated alopecia in primates as greater hair loss was associated with gravel surfaces in primate enclosures.

=== Stress ===
Social stress in animals may be increased as a result of the characteristics of the enclosures such, as size and density, which can increase engagement among individuals in the group. Stress can lead to hair loss in two ways: "alopecia may occur either because animals over-groom as a way to reduce their stress or because stress itself causes hair to fall out".

=== Hair-pulling and overgrooming ===
Hair-pulling has been identified as cause of alopecia and is defined, in the context of primates, as "pulling with the fingers or with the teeth tufts of hair from one's own or from a partner's coat … manipulating and chewing the hair, and finally swallowing it". This behaviour is often referred to in different terms depending on the type of organism displaying the behaviour. For example, the behaviour is known as hair-pulling in non-human primates, barbering in mice, and feather picking in birds. Captive animals are the primary performers of hair-pulling, and its equivalent behaviours, and the behaviour may be directed towards their own body or may occur in a social context where the hair-pulling is directed towards another individual in the enclosure.

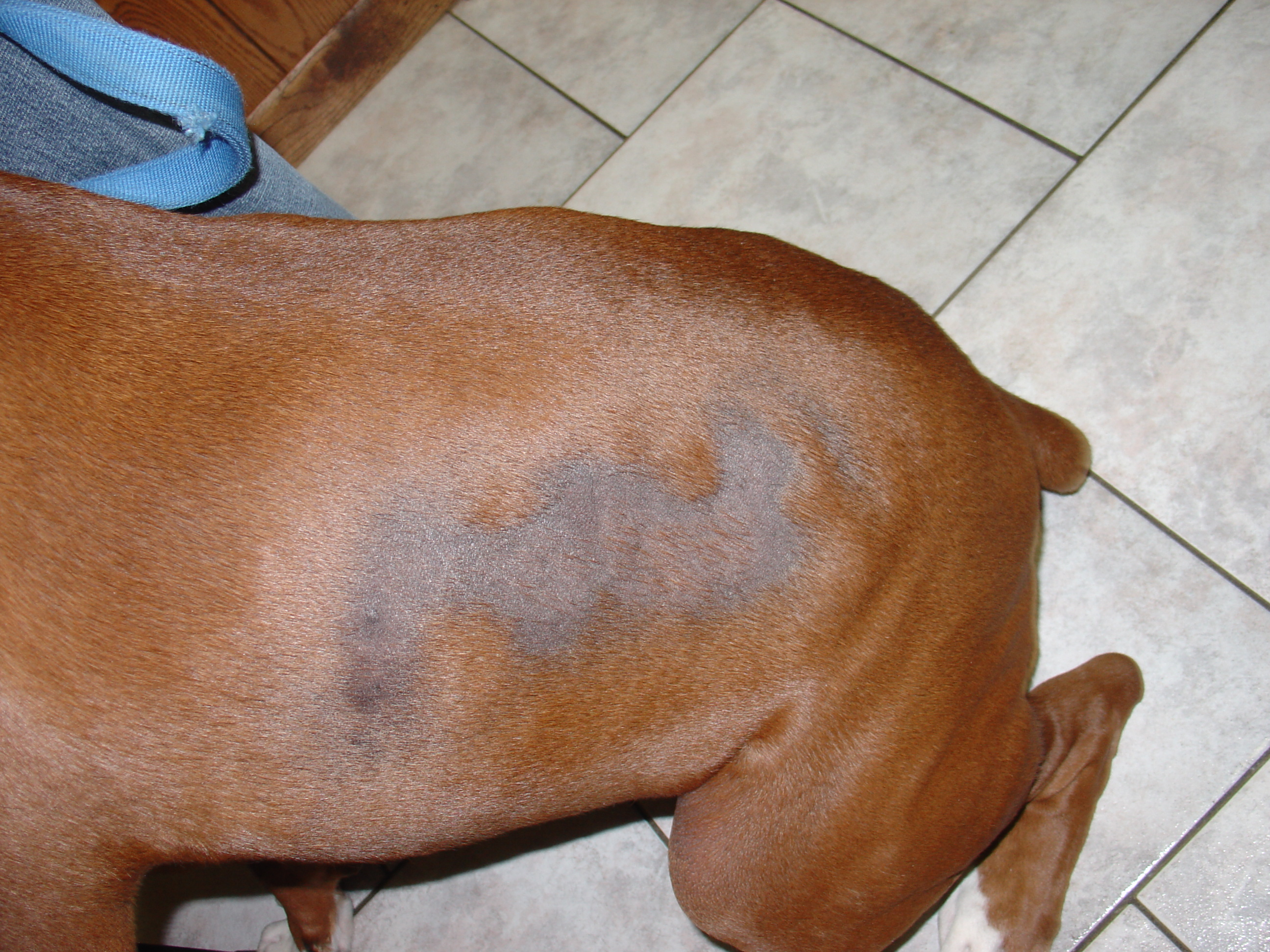
An example of a dog experiencing seasonal alopecia

Overgrooming, when individuals spend more time engaged in self or social grooming behaviours than is necessary, is another behavioural cause of alopecia in animals. This behaviour has been observed in captive primates and in some cases, appears to stem from insufficient access to adequate foraging. The presence of overgrooming in animals is often attributed to stress and occurs in other types of organisms than primates, including cats.

=== Seasonality ===
The severity of alopecia differs across seasons in some animals. For example, the winter and spring seasons are associated with more severe alopecia in rhesus macaques.

== Welfare implications ==
Substandard well-being is suggested to be a consequence of alopecia in captive animals as this condition can have implications for the health of the animal. Decreased well-being has also been associated with the presence of certain behaviours in captive animals, such as hair-pulling and overgrooming. For example, a lack of hair may make rhesus macaques more vulnerable as the affected areas are more exposed to environmental factors. Discomfort, an indicator of well-being, has been displayed by rhesus macaque individuals experiencing hair-pulling, which is a known cause of alopecia in primates. Caregivers may be better suited to evaluate and optimize the welfare of captive animals through the use of a scoring system that identifies the presence and/or extent of alopecia experienced by captive individuals. However, some studies suggest more clarity is needed on the welfare implications of the condition, or that alopecia may be visually unappealing but typically does not have negative welfare implications for the animal.

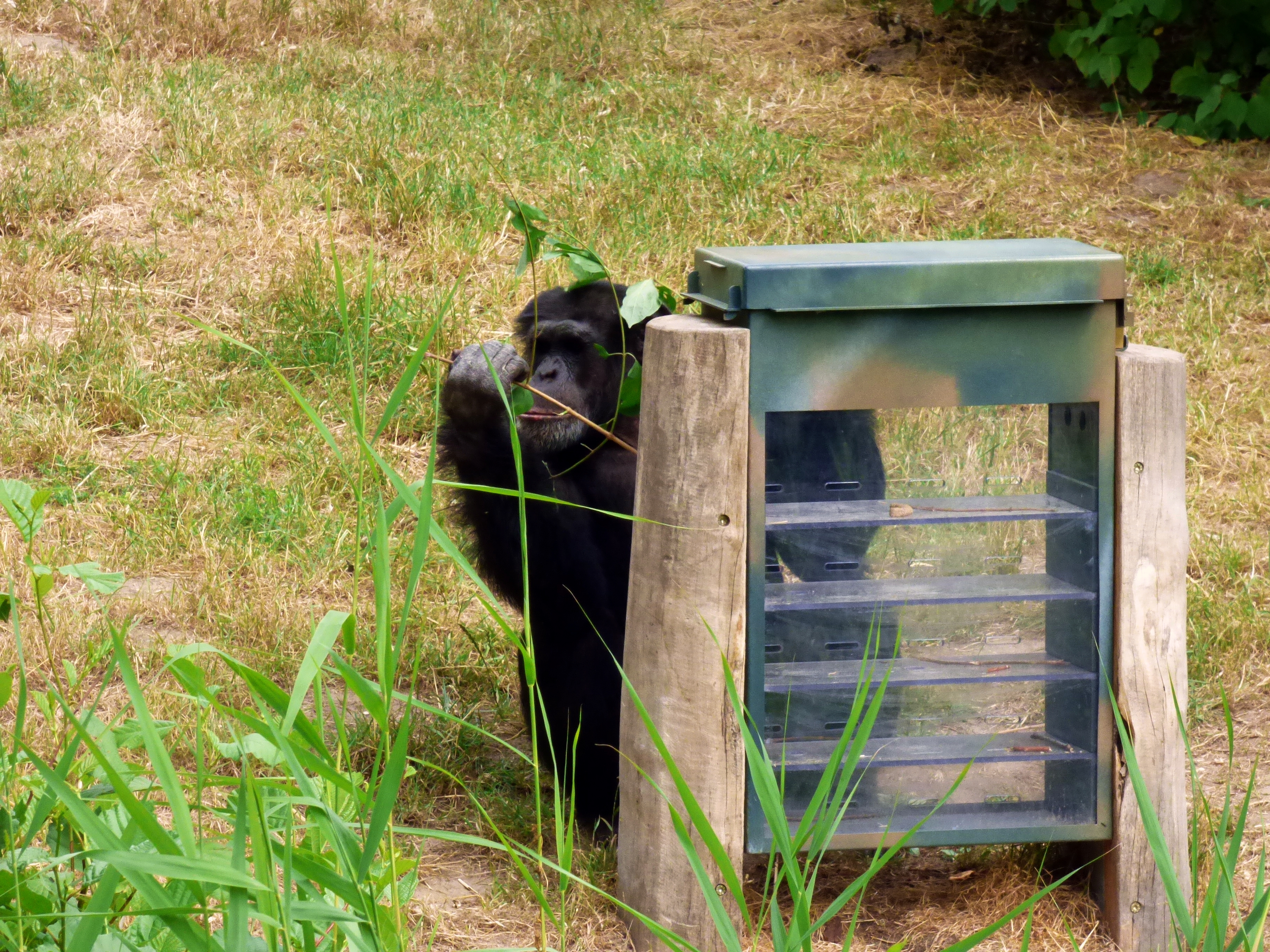
An example of environmental enrichment

== Mitigation measures ==
In order to decrease the prevalence of stereotypic behaviour, such as hair-pulling, and promote species-appropriate behaviour, caregivers of captive animals sometimes implement environmental enrichment activities. The frequency of stereotypic behaviours, such as hair-pulling, have been reduced in captive primates using enrichment activities including placing food articles in holes made in a tree, which encourages the monkeys to spend time extracting these objects as opposed to engaging in behaviours such as hair-pulling. Young mice were observed with later-onset alopecia and were less likely to develop the condition if enrichment activities were implemented in their enclosure. Modifications to the design of the enclosure may also have positive implications for alopecia in captive animals. The use of grass as opposed to gravel in rhesus macaque enclosures appeared to reduce alopecia through the redirection towards behaviour more representative of the behaviour displayed by wild individuals.

== See also ==
- Hair loss
- Captivity
- Environmental enrichment
