= Entropion (veterinary) =

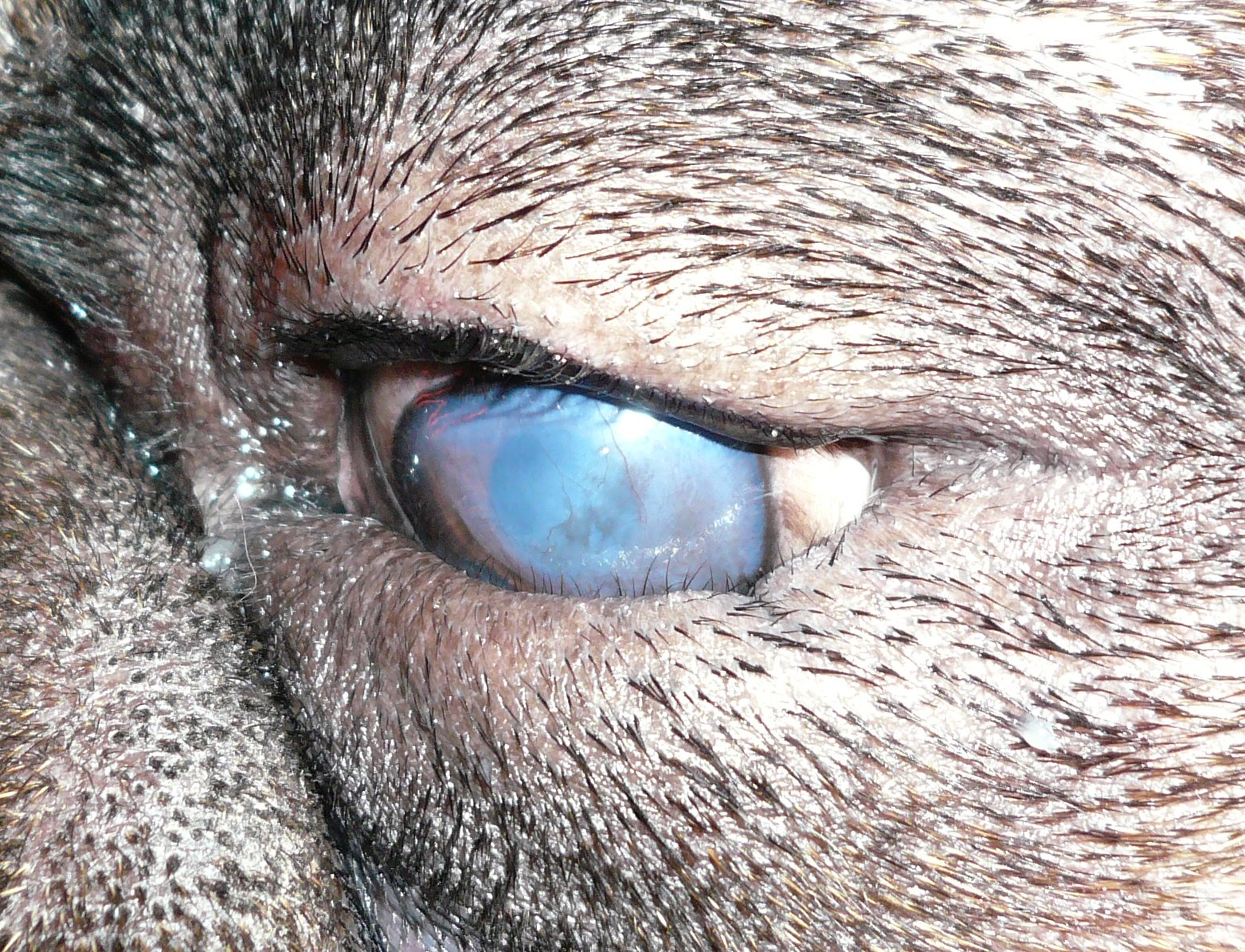
Canine entropion

Entropion is the most common eyelid disease in purebred dogs. Cats can also develop entropion. Entropion is the inward folding of the eyelid to the degree that the outer eyelid is in contact with the conjunctiva or corneal surface. Entropion can affect different parts of the eyelid. It can be defined as either primary or secondary (acquired). Primary entropion is the most common form.

== Aetiology ==
The aetiology of primary entropion is not well understood; it is known to be genetic with breed predisposition but the mechanism and related genes are unknown. A variety of factors such as the palpebral fissure, shape and size of skull, anatomy of the orbit, sex, and facial skin folds can impact the severity of entropion. The location of entropion is influenced by breed. Secondary entropion may occur due to corneal ulceration, microphthalmos, phthisis bulbi, retrobulbar fat resorption, or muscle atrophy.

== Symptoms ==
Symptoms include trigeminal irritation, lacrimation, mucopurulent discharge, conjunctival hyperaemia, and blepharospasm. Severe cases can cause corneal ulceration, neovascularisation, and impact pigmentation.

== Diagnosis ==
Diagnosis is based on the symptoms, visual examination, and signalment. Corneal damage can be diagnosed via fluorescein or rose Bengal staining.

== Treatment ==
Surgery is required for severe cases but in minor cases simply addressing the irritation with a lubricant is sufficient. Surgery may be delayed in young animals until the head has fully developed at 1.5 to 2 years; in severe cases surgery may be performed prior to full maturity but a second surgery may be required in the future. Many different surgical techniques exist for treatment, with the age of animal and type of entropion relevant to which technique is appropriate. More advanced techniques require an ophthalmologist but the simpler techniques can be performed in general practice. Ectropion can be caused by surgery when the correction is too extreme.

In puppies stay sutures can be used, these hold up the skin which everts the eyelid. For surgery a few 4-0 or 5-0 nonabsorbent sutures are used to hold up the lower and less often the upper eyelid. These are left in place for two to four weeks, after which the scarring should prevent the entropion from re-occurring, although some cases will require further treatment. Shar Peis, who often are affected as young as two or three weeks old, respond well to temporary eyelid tacking.

The Quickert–Rathbun technique is used in puppies and dogs with lower eyelid entropion. Double-ended 4-0 absorbent sutures are inserted at the conjunctival fornix to evert the eyelid.

The Celsus-Hotz technique is the most common technique and can treat a wide range of forms of entropion. The technique can also be modified to treat other forms such as medial entropion. A parallel incision is made 2-3mm from the lid margin, part of the orbicularis oculi muscle and skin are excised with the amount excised dependent on the extent of entropion, the wound is then sutured from the centre. Sutures are removed 10-12 days later.

Alternative techniques such as the Wyman technique focus on tightening the lower eyelid. This technique is not as effective in cases of enophthalmos.

Other techniques include the Wharton–Jones technique for central lower entropion; the Arrowhead technique for lateral canthal entropion, with the technique being able to be modified for microblepharon and macroblepharon; the Robertson technique for large breeds with lateral lower lid and canthal entropion; and the Gutbrod–Tietz technique, which uitlises canthoplasty for lateral canthal entropion and macroblepharon

== Epidemiology ==
Entropion has been documented in most dog breeds, although there are some breeds (particularly purebreds) that are more commonly affected than others. These include the Akita, Pug, Chow Chow, Shar Pei, St. Bernard, Cocker Spaniel, Boxer, English Springer Spaniel, Welsh Springer Spaniel, Labrador Retriever, Cavalier King Charles Spaniel, Neapolitan Mastiff, Bull Mastiff, Great Dane, Irish Setter, Shiba Inu, Rottweiler, and Poodle. Specific traits such as facial folds, loose circumorbital skin, and large droppy ears contribute to the development of entropion.

== Feline entropion ==
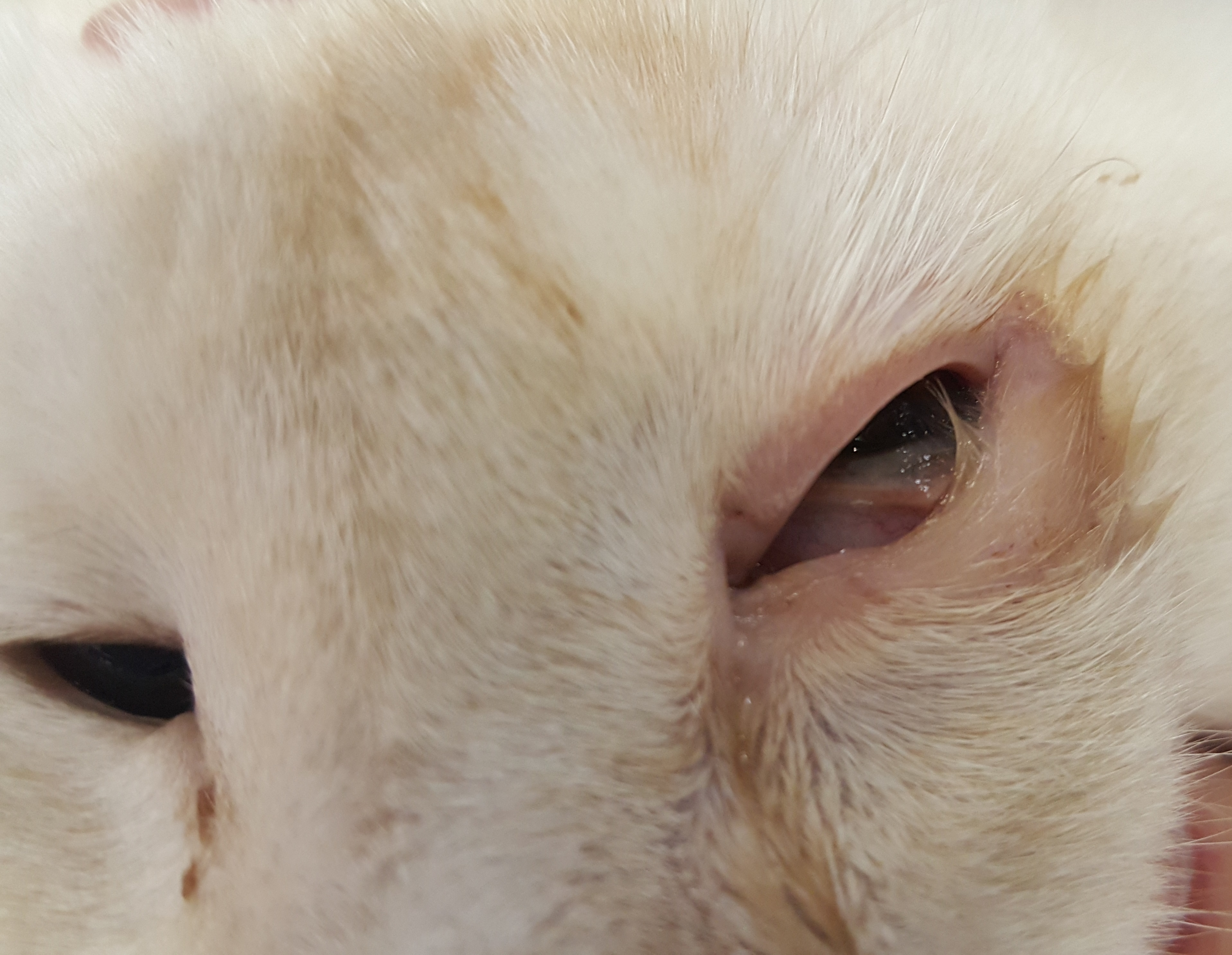
Feline entropion

Entropion is occurs at a lower frequency in cats. Typically it is secondary to trauma or infection leading to chronic eyelid changes. It is also seen secondary to enophthalmos. Primary entropion might also be encountered: the brachycephalic breeds (mostly the Persian) and the Maine Coon are predisposed.
