= Frederick William Keyl =

German painter

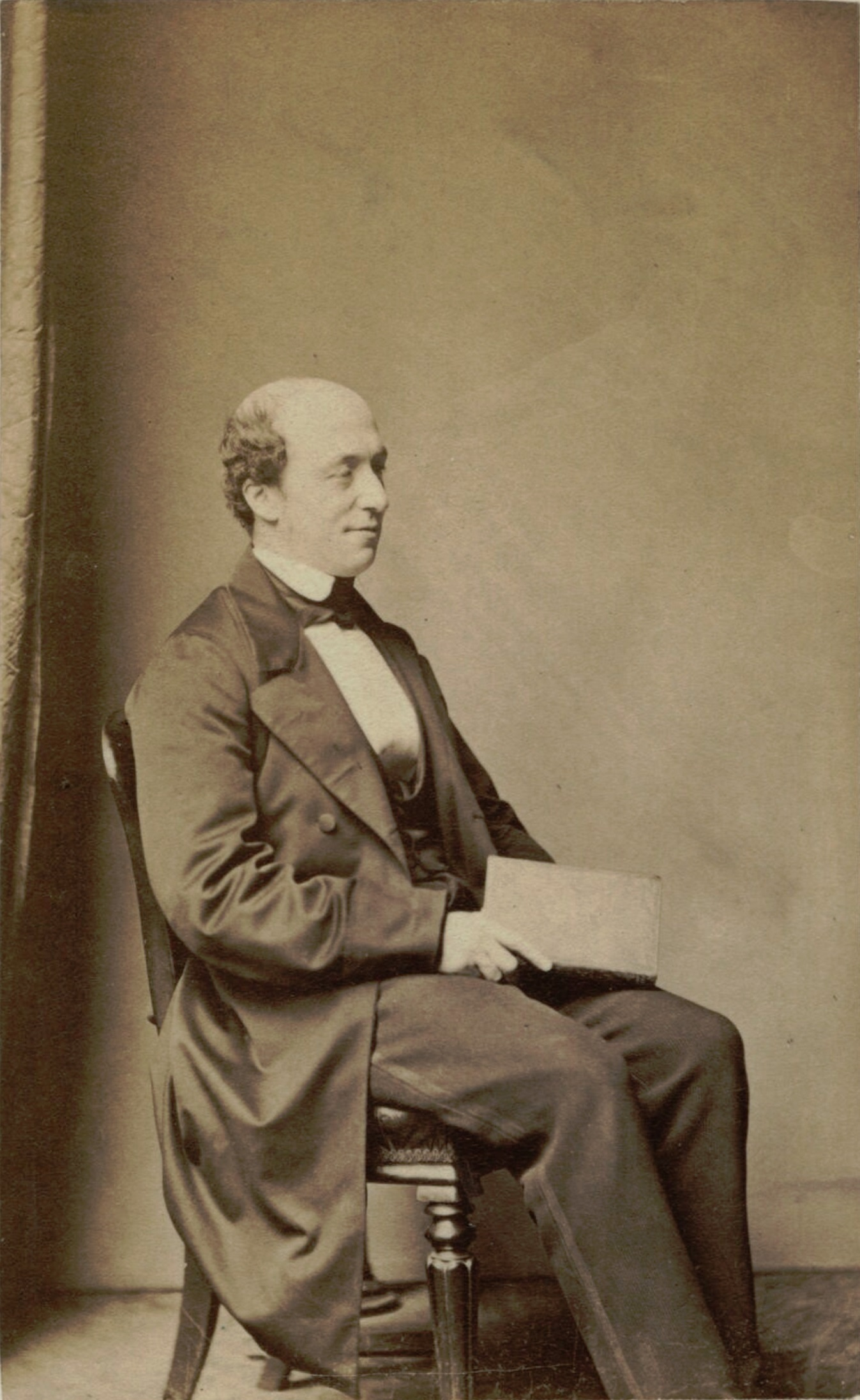
Keyl, photographed in the 1860s.

Frederick William Keyl (originally Friedrich Wilhelm Keyl; 17 September 1823 – 5 December 1871), born in Germany, was an animal painter in England; he received many commissions for paintings from Queen Victoria.

== Life ==
Keyl was born in Frankfurt am Main, son of a wine merchant, and showed at an early age an interest in drawing animals. He studied at the Städelsches Kunstinstitut in Frankfurt under Jakob Becker, and later was a pupil of Eugène Verboeckhoven in Brussels.

From 1847 he lived permanently in England, and was naturalized in 1858. He was the only pupil of Edwin Landseer, and through him Keyl was introduced to Queen Victoria and Albert, Prince Consort. He obtained many commissions from the royal family, producing oil paintings, watercolours and sketches, and painting photographs; a notable commission was to paint Looty, the Queen's Pekingese. Apart from royal patronage, work included book illustrations, and plates for the Illustrated London News.

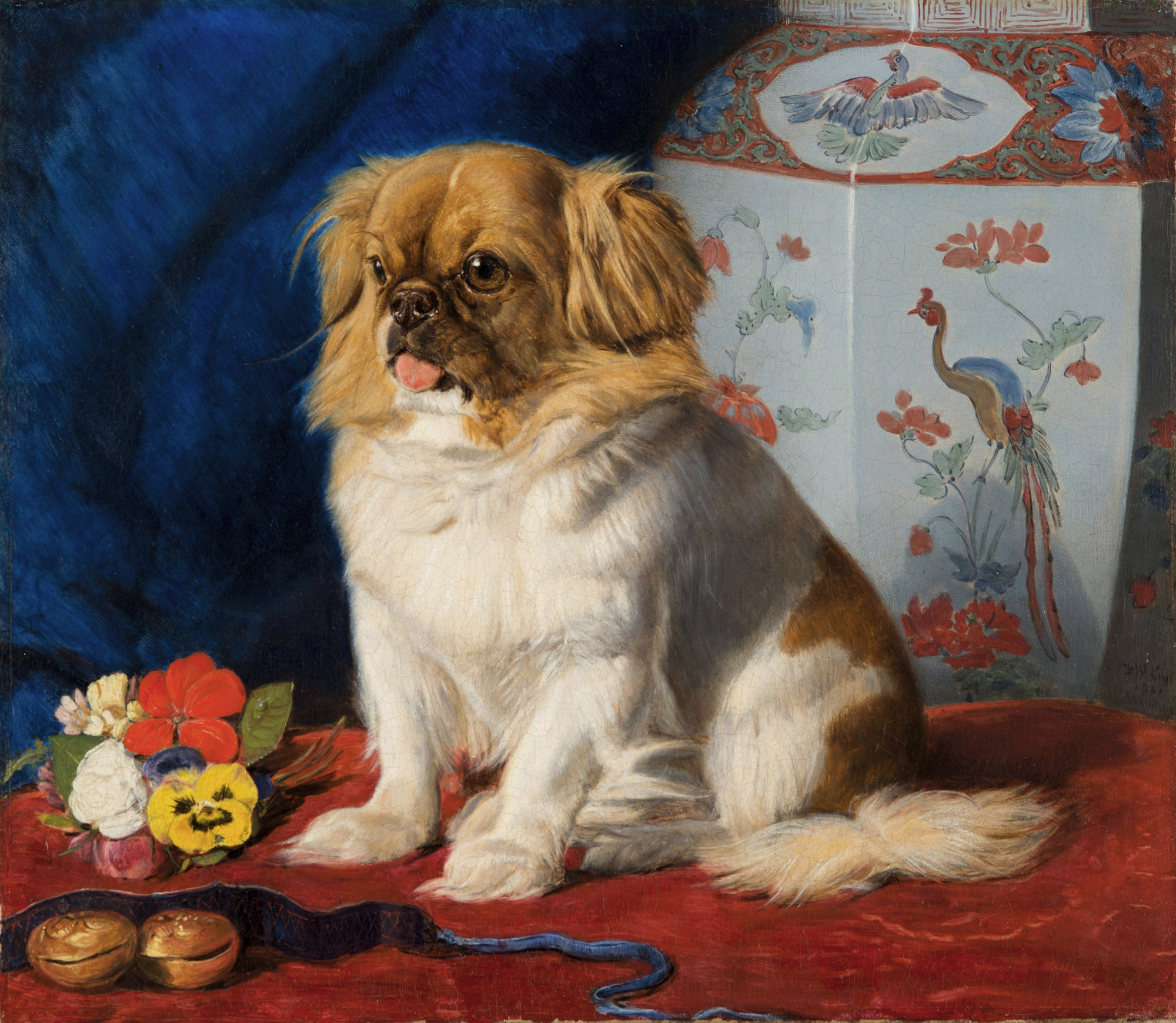
Looty (1861), in the Royal Collection.

Keyl was a frequent exhibitor at the Royal Academy of Art and the British Institution, though he was by nature averse to exhibiting his pictures.

In 1852 he married Sara Constance Woodlin, a niece of the painter C. R. Leslie. They had nine children, of whom three died in infancy. Keyl died at his home in St John's Wood, London, probably of consumption, on 5 December 1871, and was buried at Kensal Green Cemetery.
