= Pekingese =

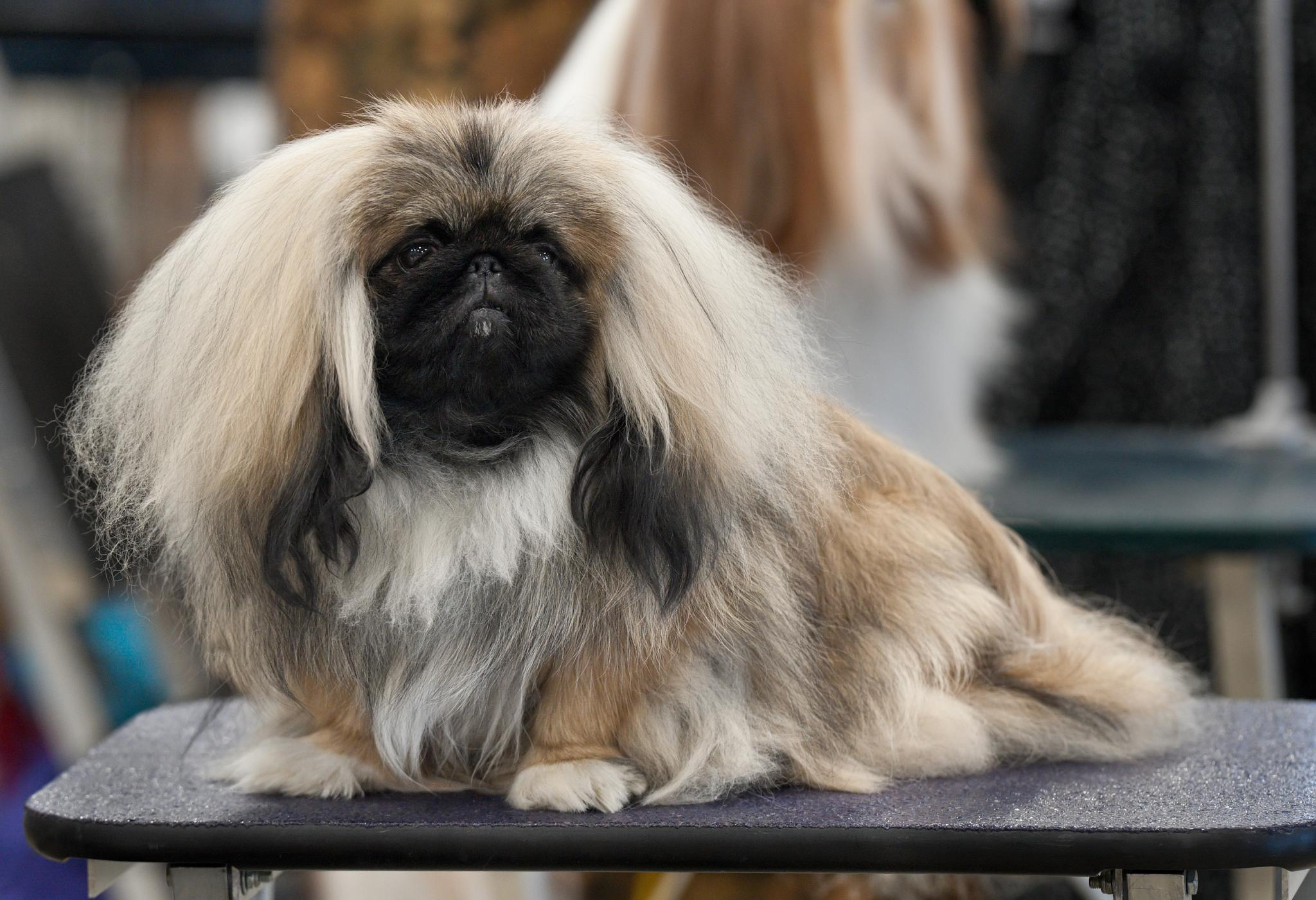
- A long-haired Pekingese brushed out and ready for show
- Common nicknames: Peke
- Origin: China
Kennel club standards
- China Kennel Union: standard
- Fédération Cynologique Internationale: standard

Pekingese
- Chinese: 北京狗
- Literal meaning: Beijing dog
Transcriptions
Standard Mandarin
- Hanyu Pinyin: Běijīng gǒu

Alternative Chinese name
- Traditional Chinese: 獅子狗
- Simplified Chinese: 狮子狗
- Literal meaning: lion dog
Transcriptions
Standard Mandarin
- Hanyu Pinyin: shīzi gǒu

The Pekingese (also spelled Pekinese) is a breed of toy dog, originating in China. The breed was favored by royalty of the Chinese Imperial court as a companion dog, and its name refers to the city of Beijing (Peking) where the Forbidden City is located. The breed has several characteristics and health issues related to its unique appearance.

== Appearance ==
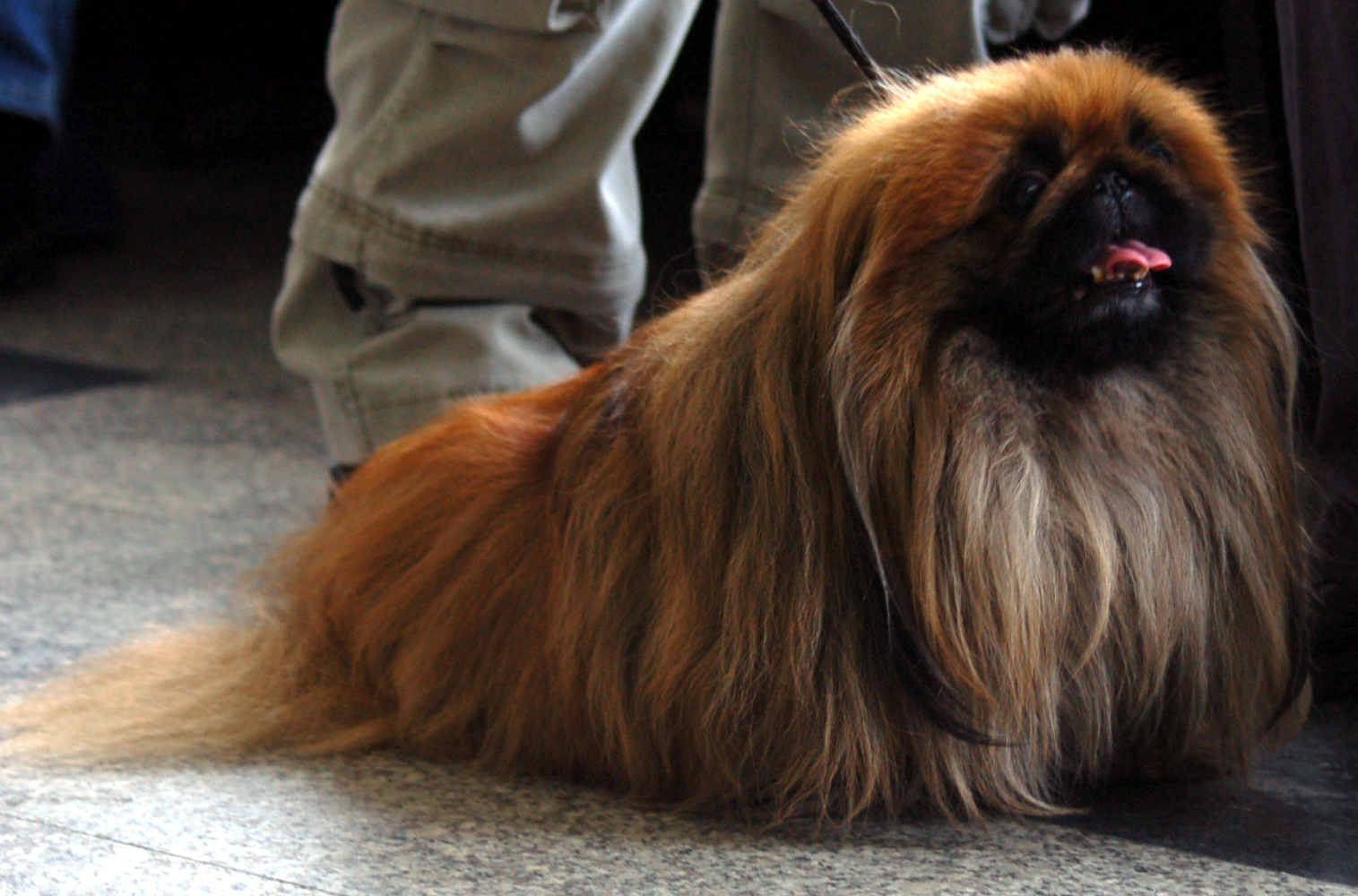
Red Pekingese

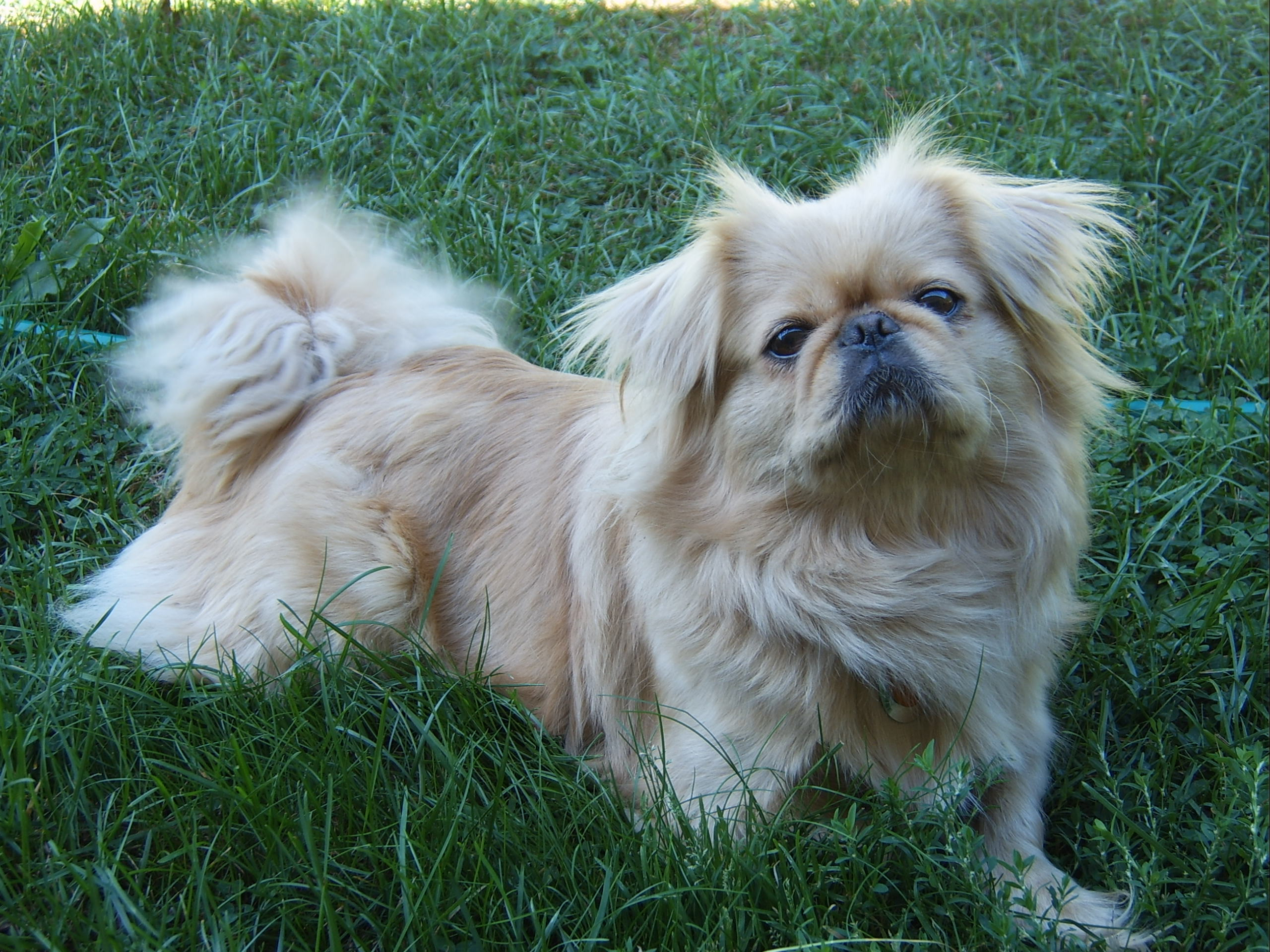
Cream Pekingese

Modern breeders and dog show judges seem to prefer the long-haired type over the more traditional spaniel-type coat.

The Pekingese's flat face and large eyes are some of the breed's most obvious characteristics. The body is compact and low to the ground. Pekingese also have a muscular and durable body. The breed has an unusual rolling gait, caused by its bowed front legs, firm hind legs, and pear-shaped body.

=== Coat ===
Breed standards allow a wide range of color combinations. The majority of Pekingese are gold, red or sable. Cream, black, white, tan, black-and-tan and occasionally 'blue' or slate grey have appeared in the breed. The latter often has poor pigment and light eyes. Albino Pekingese (white with pink eyes) should not be bred due to health problems associated with albinism.

A black mask or a self-colored face is equally acceptable in show dogs. Regardless of coat color, the exposed skin of the muzzle, nose, lips and eye rims is black. Due to heavy shedding and to prevent mats, this double-coated breed requires frequent extensive grooming.

Pekingese typically weigh from 7 to 14 lb (3.2 to 6.4 kg) and stand about 6–9 inches (15–23 cm) at the withers. A Pekingese over 14 lb is disqualified in the show ring, the only disqualification in the American Kennel Club breed standard. The Pekingese is slightly longer than tall when measured from the forechest to the rear. The overall outline is an approximate ratio of 3 high to 5 long.

=== Sleeve Pekingese ===
The sleeve Pekingese, also called the Miniature Pekingese, is a miniature form of the standard-sized dog, weighing 6 to 8 pounds (2.7 to 3.6 kg). A sleeve Pekingese is judged by the same breed standards as the standard-size.

These small dogs were developed sometime during the reign of Dao Guang. The "sleeve" name came from the custom of carrying these small dogs in the capacious sleeves of the robes worn by members of the Chinese Imperial Household. This tradition appears to be early Italian rather than Chinese, but its adoption by the Chinese Imperial Household led to dogs being bred as small as possible and to practices aimed at stunting their growth: giving puppies rice wine, holding newborns tightly for hours at a time, or putting the puppies into tight-fitting wire mesh waistcoats. These practices were apparently forbidden by Dowager Empress Cixi.

== Health ==
A 2024 UK study found a life expectancy of 13.3 years for the breed compared to an average of 12.7 for purebreds and 12 for crossbreeds. The leading cause of death for Pekingese, as for many other Toy breeds, is trauma. Primary health concerns include neurological and cardiovascular defects.

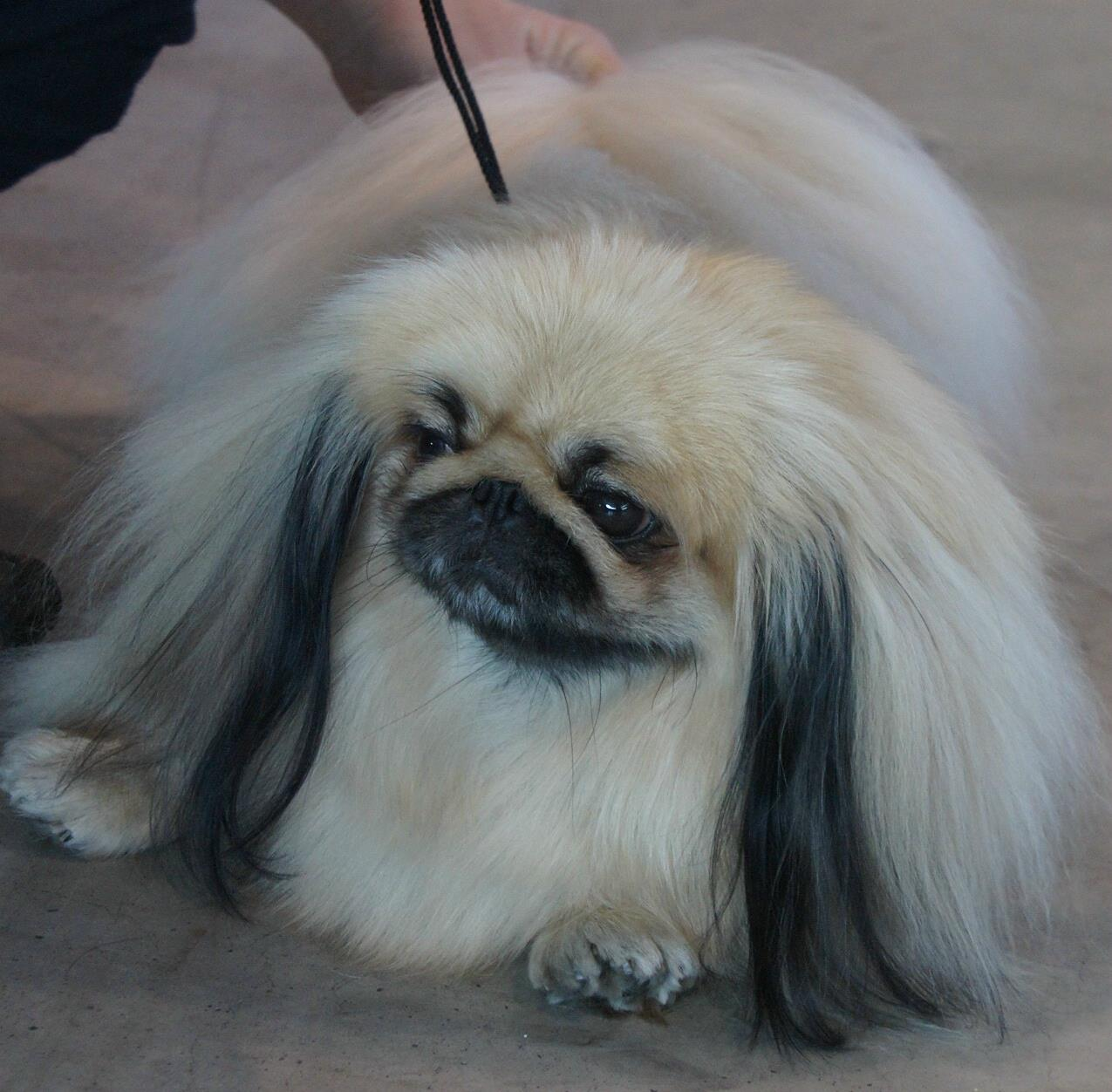
Sable Pekingese

As a result of breeding for an increasingly flattened face, the breed is brachycephalic. Therefore other potential concerns in the breed are eye issues and breathing problems, resulting from its tiny skull and flattened face. A Pekingese's nasal folds make it susceptible to trichiasis, as the folds in the modern breed contain heavier hair than older incarnations. Said nasal folds may be more excessive in Pekingese than even other brachycephalic breeds. The large eyes are also prone to injury and infection by foreign objects getting lodged in them. Other eye diseases the breed is prone to include keratitis, lagophthalmos, lens subluxion, progressive retinal atrophy, keratoconjunctivitis sicca (dry eye), and staphyloma. Pekingese are also prone to eye ulcers, which can result in individuals with the ailment being disqualified from shows. The Pekingese, however, is less likely than other brachycephalic breeds to develop entropion, possibly due to having thinner noses than other breeds like the Pug.

In an effort to address potential breathing difficulties caused by the breed's flat face, The Kennel Club (UK) significantly changed the breed standard in October 2008, removing the clause that the "profile [should be] flat with nose well up between eyes" and adding instead that the "muzzle must be evident". This was in response to public opinion following the BBC programme Pedigree Dogs Exposed.

== Care ==
The Pekingese is considered "high maintenance" in regard to grooming. The breed is double-coated, and thus both layers of its coat must be adequately brushed. The breed should never be shaved, as this can lead to sunburn. It is important to remove foreign materials from the eyes daily, and clean the creases on the face to prevent sores (hot spots). It is also necessary to keep and maintain the long fur in the rear end (aka the "trousers" or "skirt") clean and well-groomed, as the area is prone to soiling. In cold climates, the trousers may accumulate clumps of snowballs.

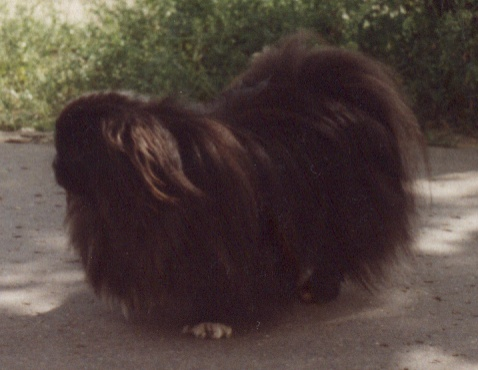
Dark coated Pekingese

Due to their abundance of fur and the brachycephalic skull, it is important to keep the Pekingese cool. The breed is prone to have heatstroke when exposed to high temperatures.

Pekingese exercise needs are minimal. Due to their extremely short snouts, they are at a higher risk for breathing difficulties (most notably brachycephalic obstructed airway syndrome). Because of this, they are rarely capable of more than 20 minutes of exercise per day, and a maximum of two such walks per day. It is important to monitor their breathing while exercising, especially if in the heat. If the Pekingese begins wheezing, exercise should cease immediately. After running, they should rest in a cool place until their breathing returns to normal. They must have access to plenty of water before, during, and after exercise to prevent overheating and dehydration.

== History ==
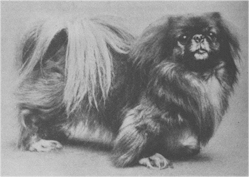
Pekingese, 1904

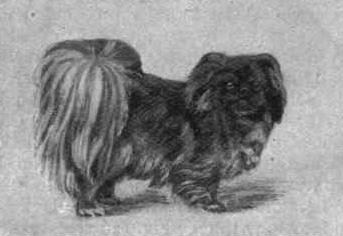
Chinese Spaniel, 1903

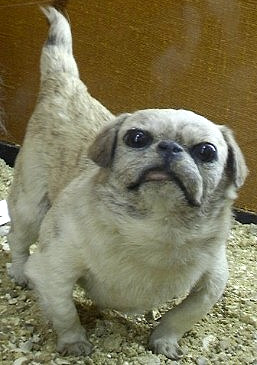
Chinese Happa dog from the 19th century, an ancestor of the modern Pekingese, Rothschild Zoological Museum, Tring, England

The breed emerged in China from several kinds of small dog owned by aristocratic families. Unlike the others, it could only be owned by members of the Chinese Imperial Palace.

During the Second Opium War, in 1860, the Old Summer Palace in Beijing was sacked and set ablaze by a combined Anglo-French expeditionary force, after the Xianfeng Emperor had fled with all of his court members to Chengde.

A British soldier, Captain John Hart Dunne came across a lone Pekingese, which he brought back to England. It was the first of the breed to survive the voyage. He presented her to Queen Victoria, who named it "Looty".

It is often said that during the sack of the palace grounds, a contingent of British and French troops entered one of the palaces. An elderly aunt of the emperor had remained behind, but when the troops entered the palace she committed suicide. She was found dead with five Pekingese beside her body. They were taken by the troops before the Summer Palace was burnt to the ground. Lord John Hay took a pair, later called Schloff and Hytien, and gave them to his sister, the Duchess of Wellington, wife of Henry Wellesley, 3rd Duke of Wellington. Sir George Fitzroy took another pair, and gave them to his cousins, the Duke and Duchess of Richmond and Gordon. The fifth was the one found by captain Dunne. However, the tale has no support from contemporary documents, while both Hay and Fitzroy may well have acquired pekes from some source, they were serving Naval officers expected to stay with their ships guarding the entrance to Beijing.

The Empress Dowager Cixi presented Pekingese to several Americans, including John Pierpont Morgan and Alice Lee Roosevelt Longworth, daughter of Theodore Roosevelt, who named her dog "Manchu".

The first Pekingese in Ireland was introduced by Dr. Heuston. He established smallpox vaccination clinics in China. The effect was dramatic. In gratitude, the Chinese minister, Li Hongzhang, presented him with a pair of Pekingese. They were named Chang and Lady Li. Dr. Heuston founded the Greystones kennel.

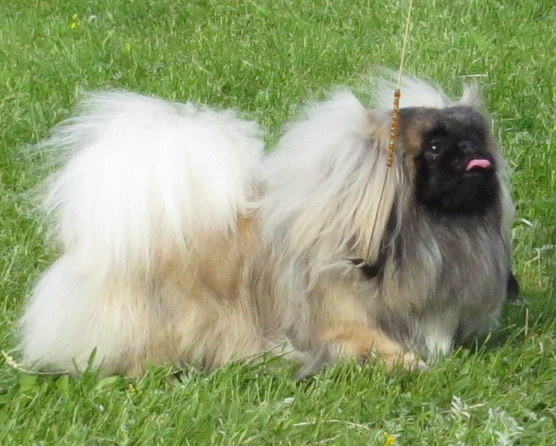
White-cream Pekingese with black mask

Around the turn of the century, Pekingese dogs became popular in Western countries. They were owned by such arbiters of fashion as Alexandra of Denmark, wife of Edward VII, and Elsie de Wolfe, popular American interior decorator. Later, they were owned by Rumer Godden, who wrote in her autobiography that "I do not like dogs except very large ones and one or two with such character that they cannot be denied; Pekingese are not dogs but something more" and by Auberon Waugh, who on one occasion fancifully boasted that one of his dogs shared his love of The Daily Telegraph and hatred for The Sunday Times.

The breed's popularity has declined in recent years, reasons including being eclipsed in popularity by the Shih Tzu and the effort required to maintain its coat. Despite this, the Pekingese is one of the top-winning breeds in the history of the Westminster Kennel Club Dog Show, with five Best in Show winners.

=== Origin myth ===
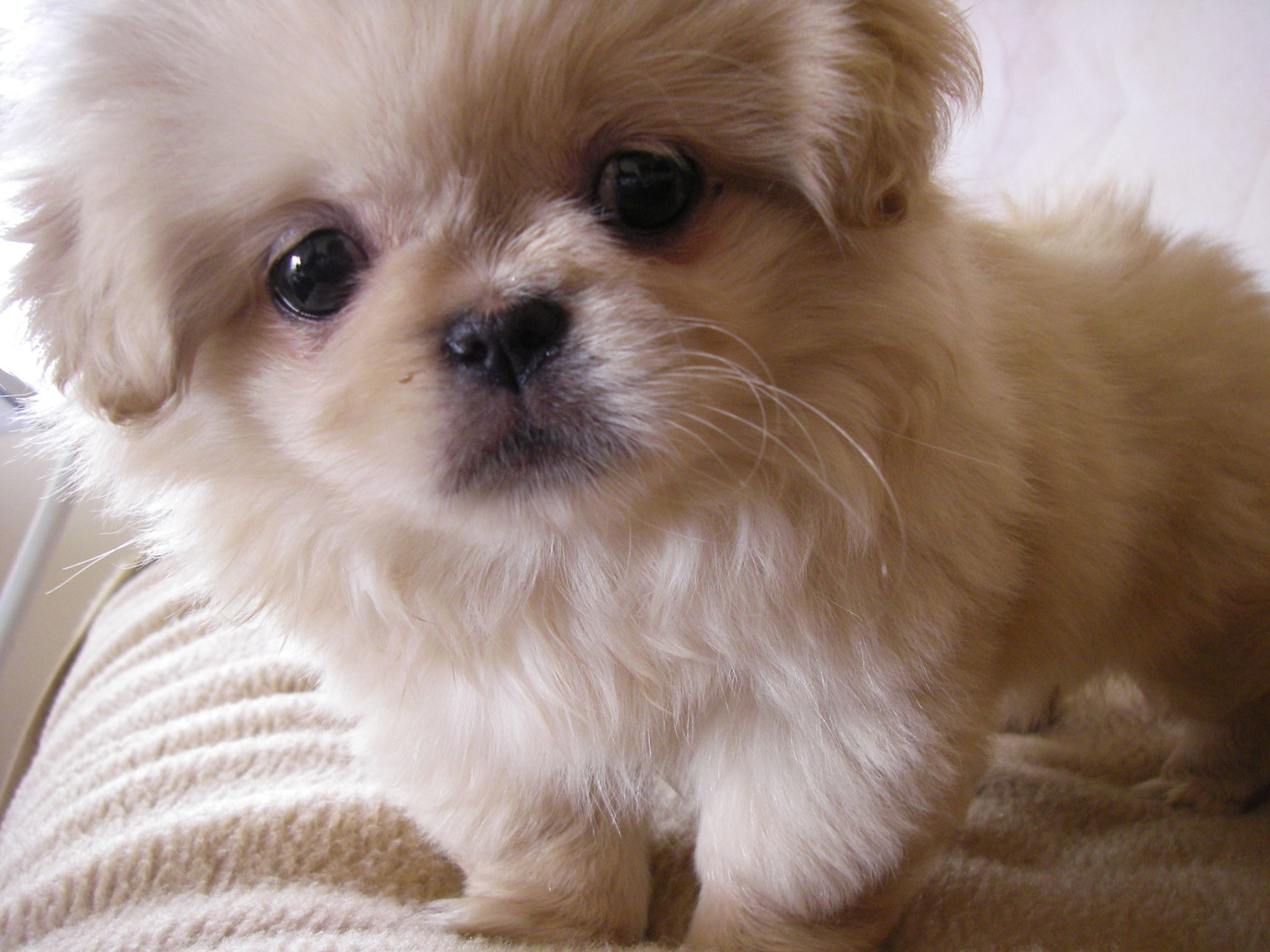
Pekingese puppy

There are two origin stories for the Pekingese. The more common one is The Lion and the Marmoset:

A lion and a marmoset fell in love, but the lion was too large. The Gods intervened to even up their sizes; in one version of the story they shrank the lion down, in another they enlarged the marmoset. The Pekingese was the result.

The other originating story is The Butterfly Lions:

A lioness fell in love with a butterfly. But they knew the difference in size was too much to overcome. Together they went to see the Buddha, who allowed their size to meet in the middle. From this, the Pekingese came, as brave as a lion yet as dainty as a butterfly.

== See also ==
- List of dog breeds
- Lion dance – a dance from China
