= Professional handler =

Trainer for dogs shows

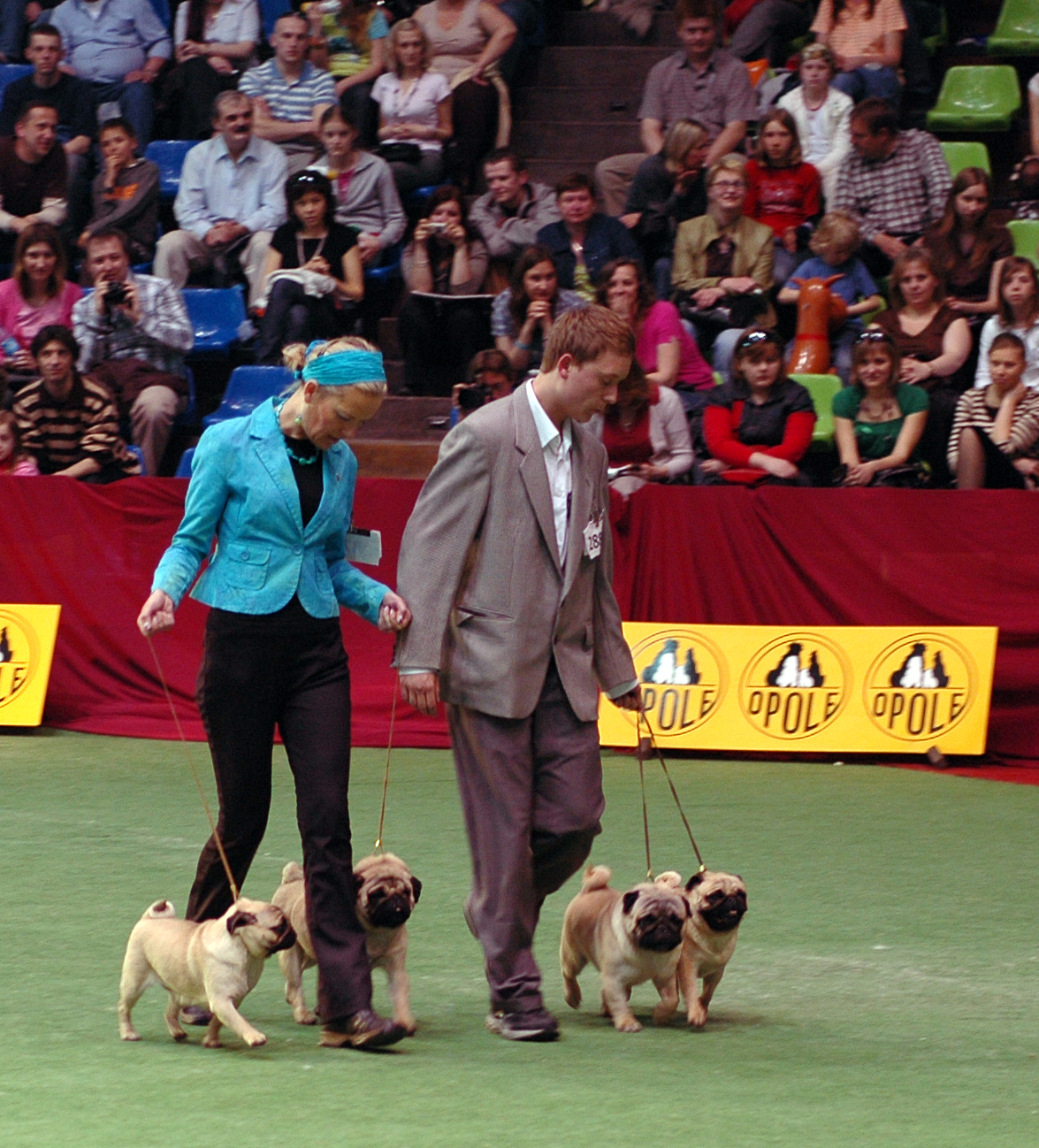
Gaiting pugs

A professional handler, sometimes called a professional dog handler is a person who trains, conditions and shows dogs in conformation shows for a fee. Handlers are hired by dog owners or breeders to finish their championship, or if finished, to show in the Best of Breed class as a "special".

== Education ==
Becoming a professional handler does not require any formal schooling, but an apprenticeship under an established handler and an adherence to a code of ethics is sometimes required in order to join into one of the professional organizations.
