= Scottish Deerhound =

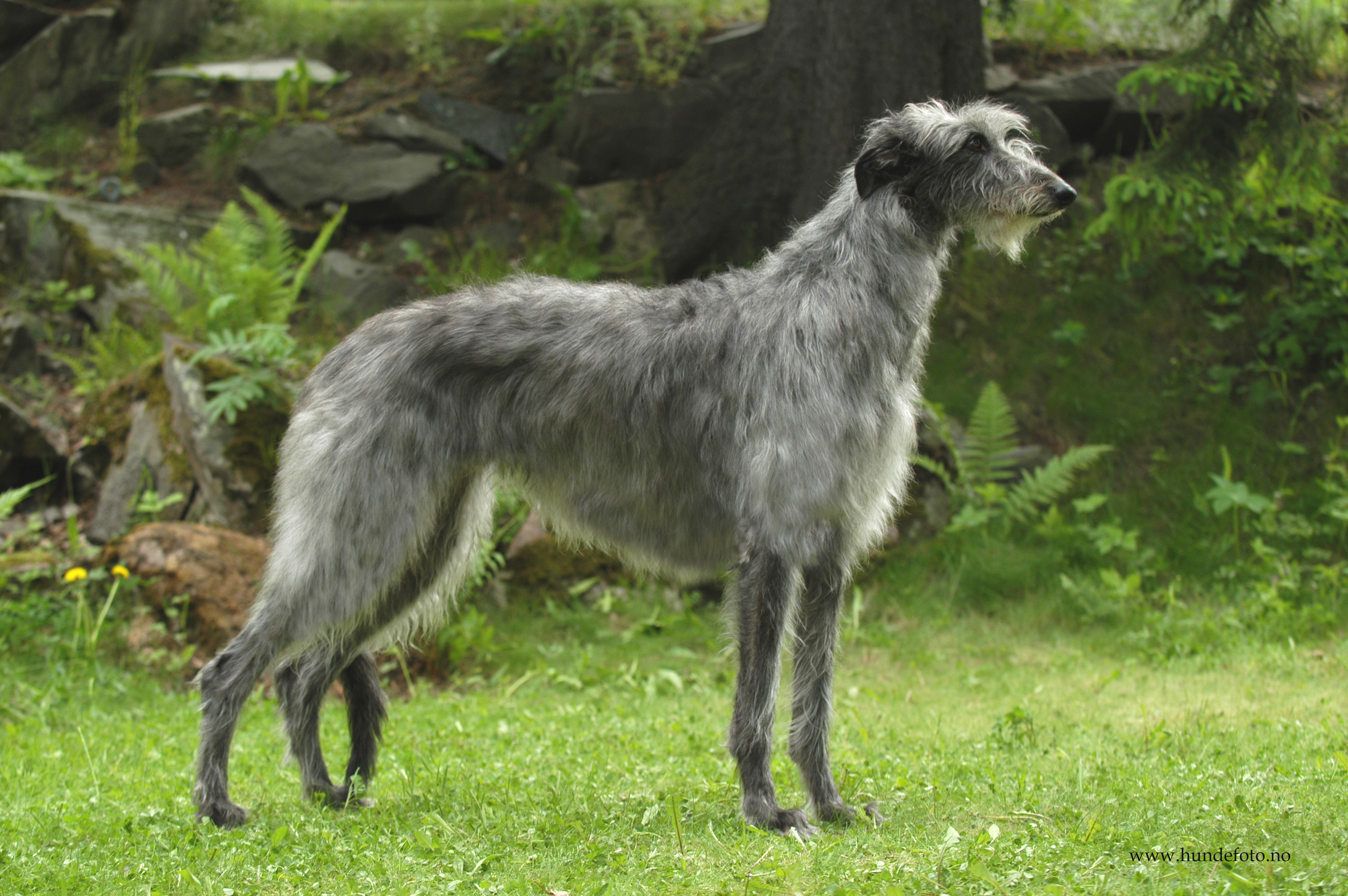
- Origin: Scotland
Traits
Height	Males	30 in (76 cm) minimum
	Females	28 in (71 cm) minimum
Weight	Males	≈ 100 lb (45 kg)
	Females	≈ 80 lb (36 kg)
- Coat: wiry
- Colour: blue-grey, grey, brindle, yellow, sandy-red or red fawns with black points; white on chest, toes and tip of tail is permissible
Kennel club standards
- The Kennel Club: standard
- Fédération Cynologique Internationale: standard

The Scottish Deerhound, or simply the Deerhound, is a breed of large sighthound, once bred to hunt the red deer by coursing. In outward appearance it is similar to the Greyhound, but larger and more heavily boned, with a rough coat.

== History ==
The Hilton of Cadboll Stone dates from around 1200 years ago, and depicts at the bottom of the panel a deer being chased by two large dogs and two armed horsemen. However, systematic zooarchaeology and genetics have yet to show any connection between those symbolic representations of dog types and the modern breed, which only became widely known as the Scottish Deerhound related to English regional greyhounds, such as the Highland greyhound in the early 19th century. The Deerhound was in earlier times believed to be descended from old Gaelic hounds, and therefore closely related to the Irish Wolfhound, it was in fact the major foundation breed in the late 19th century of the modern Irish Wolfhound.

The Deerhound was bred to hunt red deer by coursing and deer-stalking until the end of the nineteenth century. With modern rifles and smaller deer-forests, slower tracking dogs were preferred to fast and far-running Deerhounds. In coursing deer, a single Deerhound or a pair was brought as close as possible to red deer, then released to run one of them down by speed, which if successful would happen within a few minutes — rarely were there successful sustained chases.

Anne of Denmark, queen consort of James VI and I, sent deer hounds as gifts to her brother Christian IV of Denmark. With the eventual demise of the clan systems in Scotland, these hunting dogs became sporting animals for landowners and the nobility, but were also bred and hunted with by common folk when feasible. As fast and silent hunters they made quick work of any game the size of a hare or larger and were highly regarded by nobility and poachers alike. One of the most precarious times in the breed's history seems to have been towards the end of the nineteenth century, when many of the large Scottish estates were split into small estates for sporting purposes, and few then kept Deerhounds. The new fashion was for stalking and shooting, which required only a tracking dog to follow the wounded animal, using a collie or similar breed. Although a few estates still employed Deerhounds for their original work, the breed was left in the hands of a few enthusiasts who made them a show breed.

Teddy Roosevelt wrote that some Canadian and American hunters used "the greyhound, whether the smooth-haired, or the rough-coated Scotch deer-hound" on the wolf and deer Dr. Q van Hummell also remarks on his Deerhound pack being used on timber wolves and coyotes. In Australia, Deerhounds and their cross-breeds such as the Kangaroo Dog have historically been used to hunt the kangaroo as well as wild boar, modern descriptions of such hunts with Deerhounds on kangaroo and emu have been recorded by Kenneth Cassels.

== Description ==
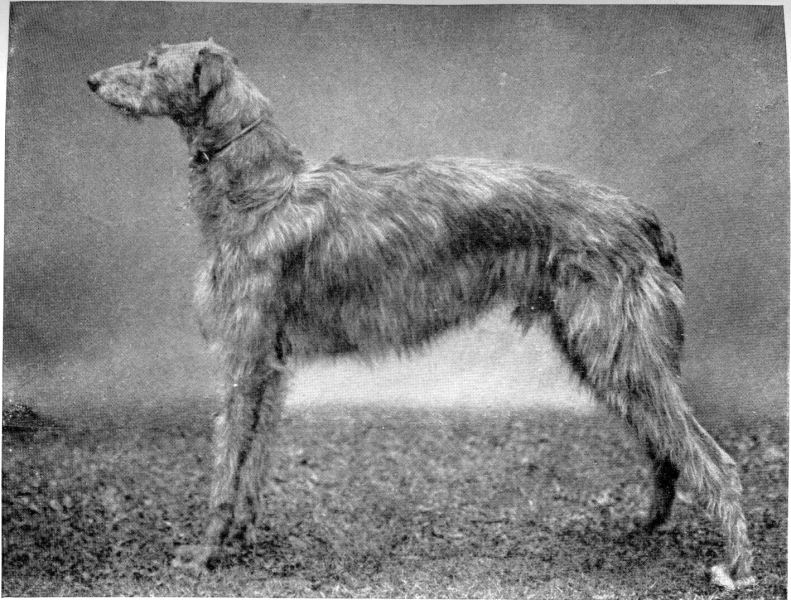
Mrs. Armstrong's champion dog "Talisman" in about 1910

In outward appearance, the Scottish Deerhound is similar to the Greyhound, but larger and more heavily boned. However, Deerhounds have a number of characteristics that set them apart. While not as fast as a Greyhound on a smooth, firm surface, once the going gets rough or heavy they can outrun a Greyhound. The environment in which they worked, the cool, often wet, and hilly Scottish Highland glens, contributed to the larger, rough-coated appearance of the breed.

The Scottish Deerhound resembles a rough-coated greyhound. It is however, larger in size and bone. Minimum desirable height at withers of males is 30 inches (75–80 cm) or more, weight 85 to 110 pounds (39 to 50 kg); height of females from 28 inches (71 cm) upwards, weight from 75 to 95 pounds (34 to 43 kg). It is one of the tallest sighthounds, with a harsh 3–4-inch (7.6–10 cm) long coat and mane, somewhat softer beard and moustache, and softer hair on breast and belly. It has small, dark "rose" ears which are soft and folded back against the head unless held semi-erect in excitement.

The harsh, wiry coat in modern dogs is only seen in self-coloured various shades of grey (blue-grey is preferred). Historically, Deerhounds also could be seen with true brindle, yellow, and red fawn coats, or combinations. 19th century Scottish paintings tend to indicate these colours were associated with a wire haired coat, but, with show breeders preferring a dark, longer coat, these genes now appear to be lost. The geneticist R. Jödicke said – During the 20th century the Deerhound evolved to a single-coloured breed by selection for a grey coat. Some other coat colours are documented in historical sources but have definitely been lost. The recent colour of adult Deerhounds shows little variation. i.e. in the degree of darkness of the grey colour and the occurrence of a fawn shade. Altogether the Deerhound must be characterised as the breed with the most uniform colouration within all sighthounds". A white chest and toes are allowed, and a slight white tip to the tail; a white blaze on the head or a white collar are not accepted.

The head is long, skull flat, with little stop and a tapering muzzle. The eyes are dark, dark brown or hazel in colour. The teeth should form a level, complete scissor bite. The long straight or curved tail, well covered with hair, should almost reach the ground.

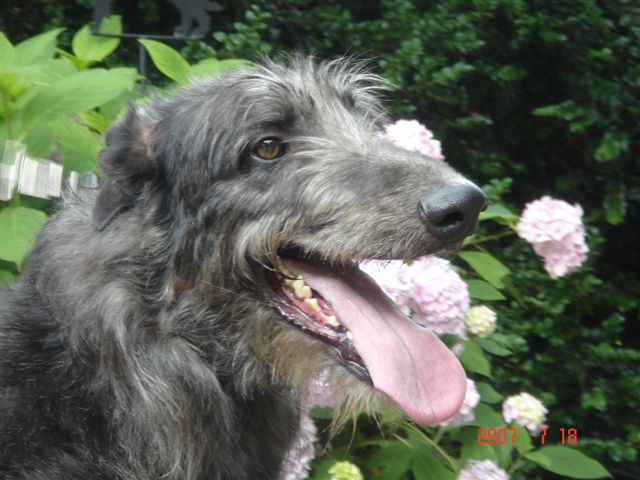
The head of a Deerhound

== Health ==
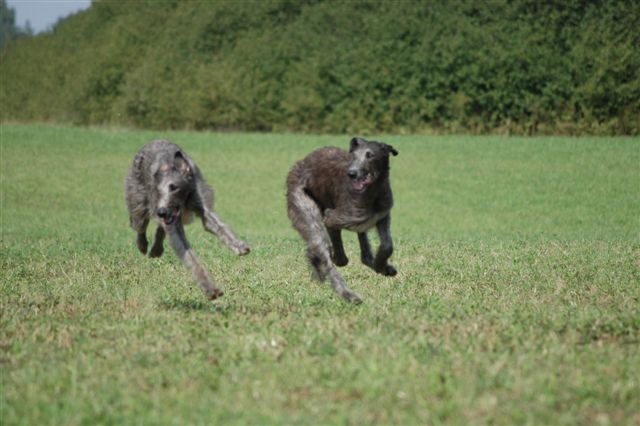
Running

A 2024 UK study found a life expectancy of 10.5 years for the breed compared to an average of 12.7 for purebreeds and 12 for crossbreeds. A survey conducted by the British Small Animal Veterinary Association of The Kennel Club recognised breed club members found the most common cause of death was cardiac related making up nearly a quarter of all deaths. The second most common was cancer, making up 18% of deaths.

Laboratory studies have established reference intervals for haematology and serum biochemical profiles in Deerhounds, some of which are shared by all sighthounds, and some of which may be unique to this breed.

Dilated cardiomyopathy has a higher prevalence in the Scottish Deerhound. In one American study 6% of Scottish Deerhounds had the condition, the highest of any breed.

== Notable dogs ==
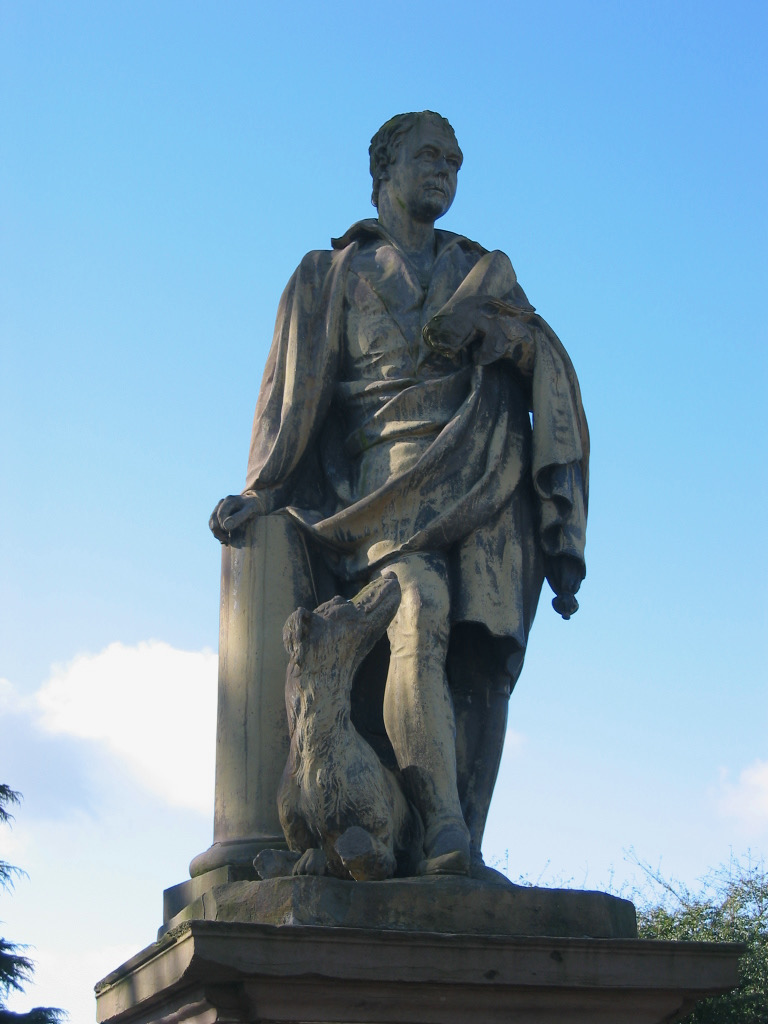
Sir Walter Scott's Deerhound, Maida, was included in his statue in Perth, Scotland

- Maida, Sir Walter Scott's dog
- Foxcliffe Hickory Wind
