= Cavalier King Charles Spaniel =

British breed of toy dog spaniel

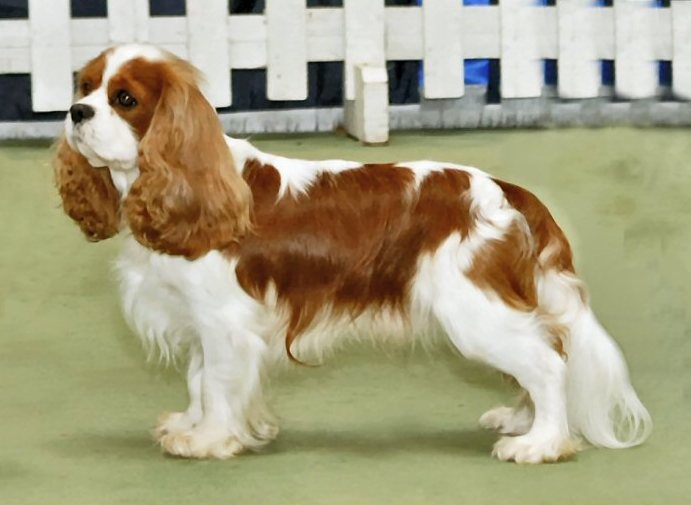
- Blenheim Cavalier King Charles Spaniel
- Origin: United Kingdom
Traits
- Weight: 5.4–8 kg (12–18 lb)
- Colour: Blenheim, black-and-tan, ruby or tricolour
Kennel club standards
- The Kennel Club: standard
- Fédération Cynologique Internationale: standard

The Cavalier King Charles Spaniel (CKCS) is a British breed of toy dog of spaniel type. Four colours are recognised: Blenheim (chestnut and white), tricolour (black/white/tan), black and tan, and ruby; the coat is smooth and silky. The lifespan is usually between eight and twelve years.

The toy spaniels which were the predecessors of the Cavalier changed dramatically in the nineteenth century, when they were inter-bred with flat-nosed breeds. Until the 1920s, the Cavalier shared the same history as the smaller King Charles Spaniel. Breeders attempted to recreate what they considered to be the original configuration – a dog resembling Charles II's spaniel of the English Civil War period, when supporters of the king were known as Cavaliers.

== History ==
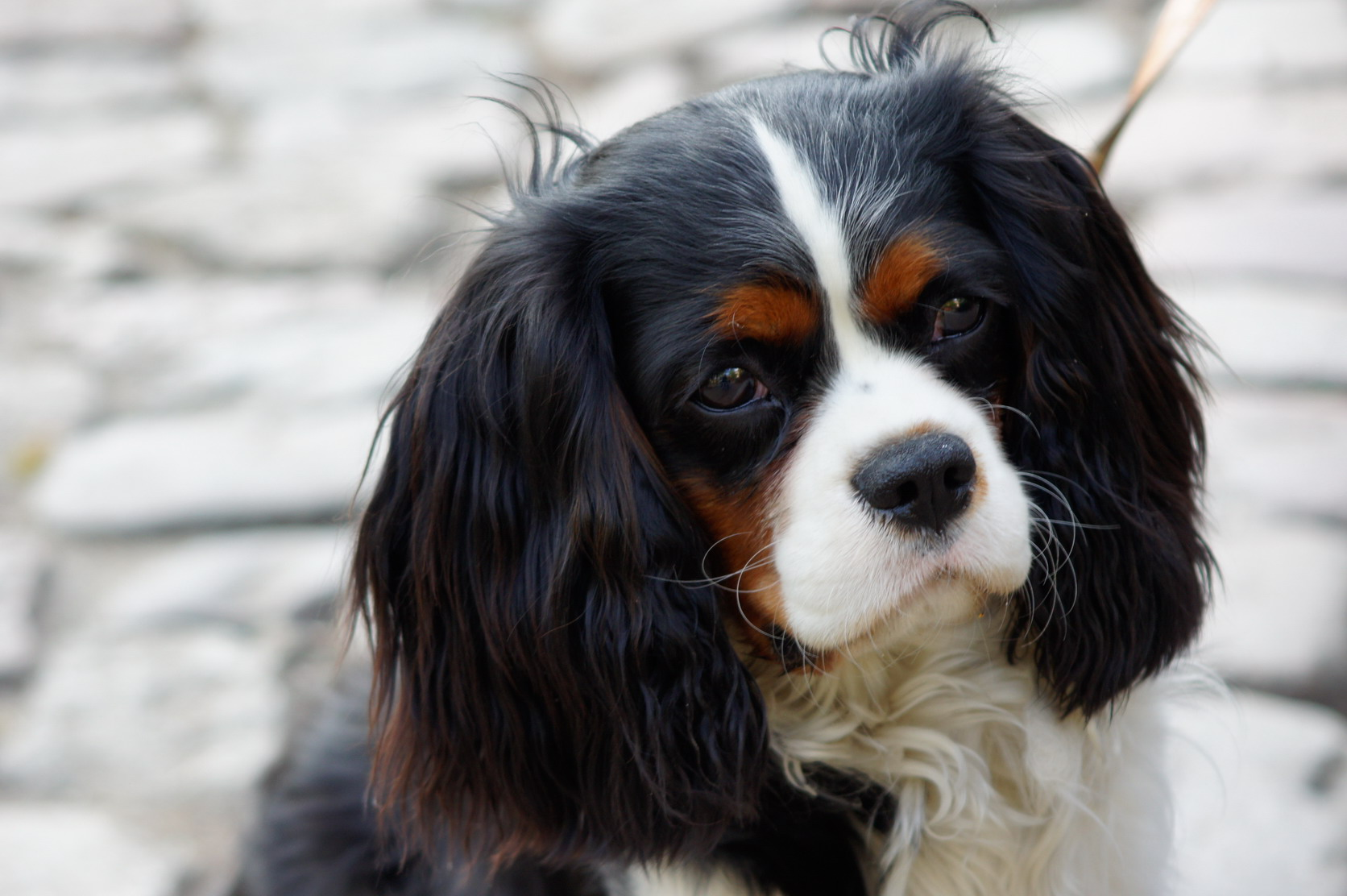
Cavalier King Charles Spaniel; lesser stop; skull not inclined to be domed with spot in centre of skull on the Blenheim. A white blaze between the eyes is standard of the Tricolour variety.

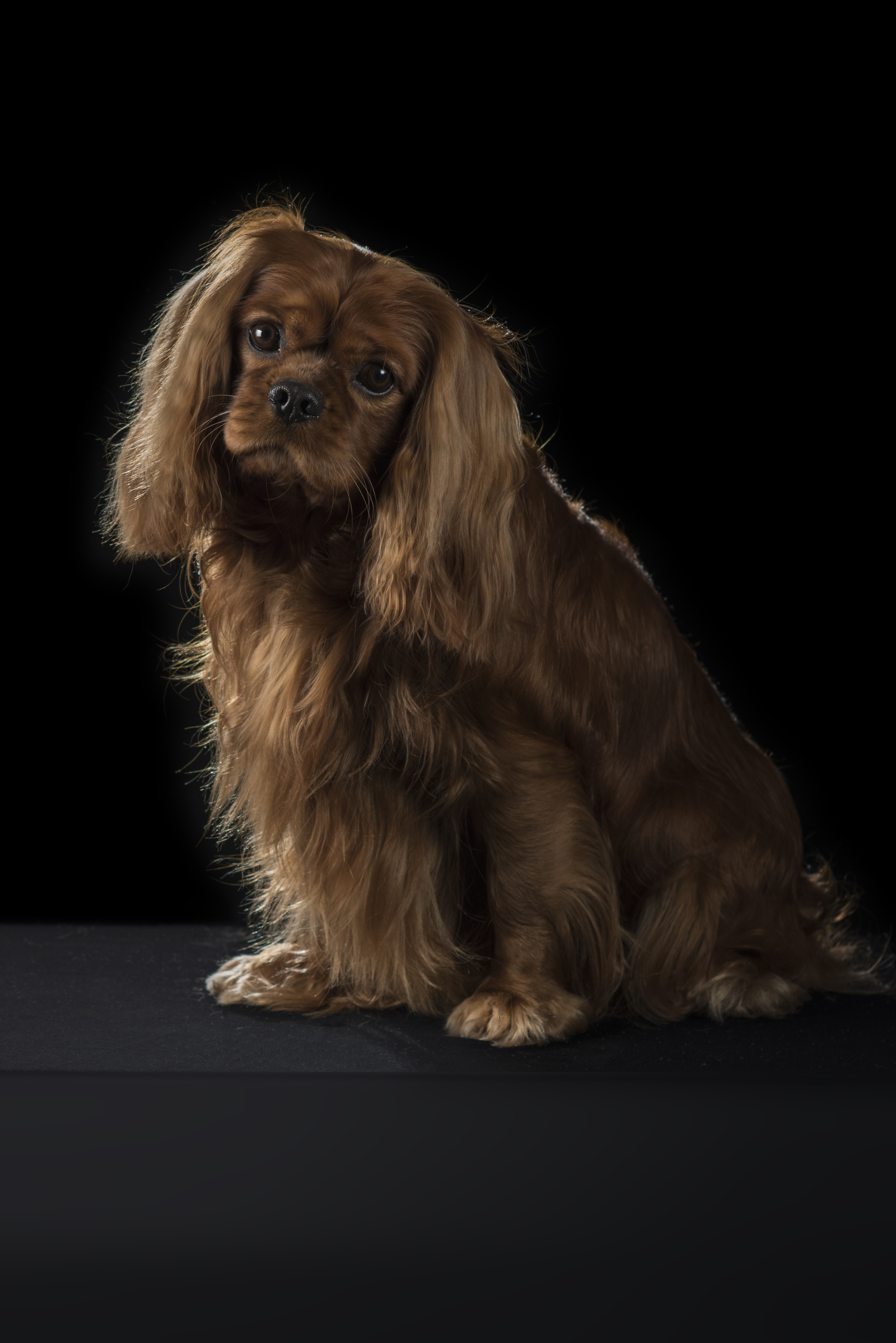
Correct Ruby Cavalier King Charles Spaniel; uniform chestnut colour, with no white markings; ears and slippers are often slightly lighter but dark chestnut colour should predominate

During the early part of the 18th century, John Churchill, 1st Duke of Marlborough, kept red and white King Charles type spaniels for hunting. The duke recorded that they were able to keep up with a trotting horse. His estate was named Blenheim in honour of his victory at the Battle of Blenheim. Because of this influence, the red and white variety of the King Charles Spaniel and thus the Cavalier King Charles Spaniel became known as the Blenheim.

The exact relationship of the different toy spaniels was a matter of much debate among dog writers in the late 19th and early 20th centuries. In the book "Toy Dogs and Their Ancestors Including the History And Management of Toy Spaniels, Pekingese, Japanese and Pomeranians" published under the name of the "Hon. Mrs. Neville Lytton" in 1911, Judith Blunt-Lytton, 16th Baroness Wentworth documented her attempts to investigate their lineage by crossing Blenheims with the now extinct Toy Trawler Spaniels which she considered the best living representative of the 17th-century type.

=== Divergence from King Charles Spaniel ===
In 1926, the American Roswell Eldridge offered a dog show class prize of 25 pounds of sterling silver each as a prize for the best male and females of "Blenheim Spaniels of the old type, as shown in pictures of Charles II of England's time, long face, no stop, flat skull, not inclined to be domed, with spot in centre of skull." The breeders of the era were appalled, although several entered what they considered to be sub-par Cavalier King Charles Spaniels in the competition. Eldridge died before seeing his plan come to fruition, but several breeders believed in what he said and in 1928 the first Cavalier club was formed. The first standard was created, based on a dog named "Ann's Son" owned by Katherine Mostyn Walker, and the Kennel Club recognised the variety as "King Charles Spaniels, Cavalier type".

The Second World War caused a drastic setback to the emerging breed, with the vast majority of breeding stock destroyed because of wartime hardship and food shortages. For instance, in the Ttiweh Cavalier Kennel, the population of 60 dogs dropped to three during the 1940s. On 5th December 1944, the Kennel Club first recognised the breed in its own right as the Cavalier King Charles Spaniel. Leading breeders Amice Pitt, Katie Eldred and Madame Harper-Trois-Fontaines then examined the Kennel Club registration lists and identified up to 200 dogs of 'Cavalier type' among the King Charles Spaniels, 60 of which had been born during the War. However 53 of the latter were sired by just one dog, Plantation Banjo, so the gene pool was severely restricted.

The first recorded Cavalier living in the United States was brought from the United Kingdom in 1956 by Lyons and Sally Brown who, together with Elizabeth Spalding and other enthusiasts, founded the Cavalier King Charles Club USA that continues to the present day. In 1994, the American Cavalier King Charles Spaniel Club was created by a group of breeders to apply for recognition by the American Kennel Club. It was recognised by the American Kennel Club in 1995, and the ACKCSC became the parent club for Cavaliers. Since 2000, it has grown in popularity in the United States and ranks as the 13th most popular pure-breed in the United States.

== Description ==
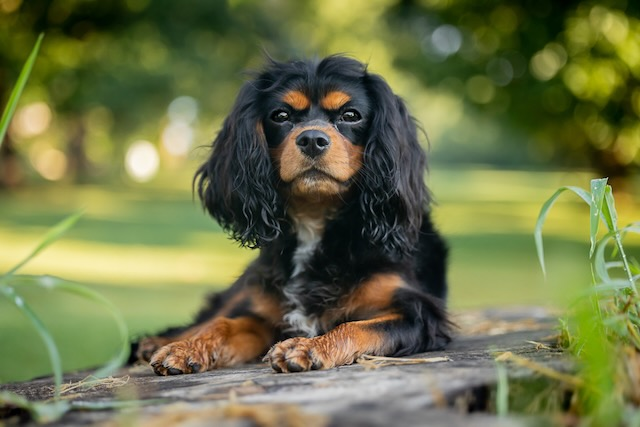
A purebred Black and Tan uniform.

Historically the Cavalier King Charles Spaniel was a lap dog and is small for a spaniel, with fully grown adults comparable in size to adolescents of other larger spaniel breeds. The tail is usually not docked, and the Cavalier should have a silky coat of moderate length. Standards state that it should be free from curl, although a slight wave is allowed. Feathering can grow on their ears, feet, legs and tail in adulthood. Standards require this be kept long, with the feathering on the feet a particularly important aspect of the breed's features.

The Cavalier King Charles Spaniel and the English Toy Spaniel can often be confused with each other. In the United Kingdom, the English Toy Spaniel is called the King Charles Spaniel, while in the United States, one of the colours of the Toy Spaniel is known as King Charles. The two breeds share similar history and only diverged from each other about 100 years ago. There are several major differences between the two breeds, with the primary difference being size. While the Cavalier weighs on average between 13 and 18 pounds (5.9 and 8.2 kg), the King Charles is smaller at 9 to 15 pounds (4.1 to 6.8 kg). In addition, their facial features, while similar, are different; the Cavalier's ears are set higher and its skull is flat, while the King Charles's skull is domed. Finally, the muzzle length of the Cavalier tends to be longer than that of its King Charles cousin.

=== Colour ===
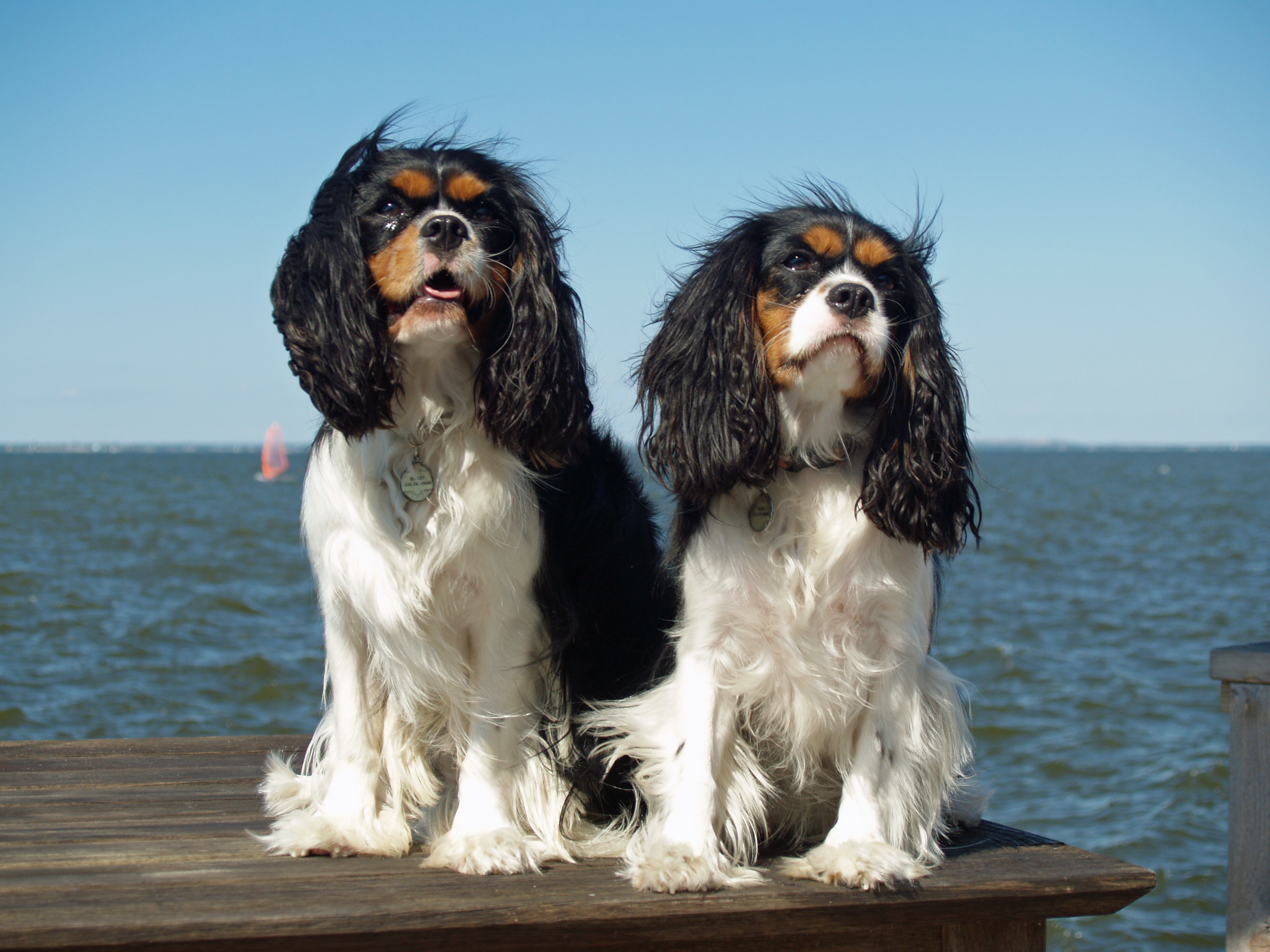
Tricolour Cavalier King Charles Spaniels

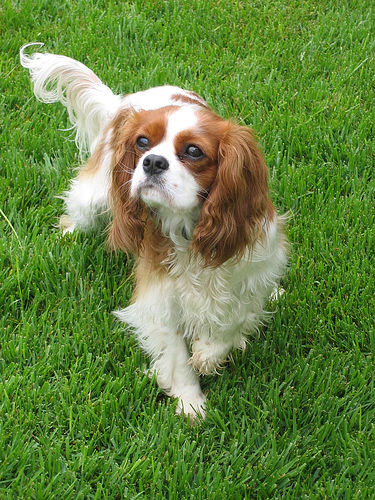
Cavalier King Charles Spaniel, Blenheim variety, with chestnut brown markings on a white background on its back, patches over eyes and all brown ears

The breed has four recognized colours. Cavaliers that have rich chestnut markings on a pearly white background are known as Blenheim in honor of Blenheim Palace, where John Churchill, 1st Duke of Marlborough raised for assistance in hunting the predecessors to the Cavalier breed in this particular colour. In some Blenheim dogs there is a chestnut spot in the middle of the forehead: this is called the "Blenheim" spot. The Blenheim spot is also known as the mark of the "Duchess Thumb Print", based on the legend that Sarah Churchill, Duchess of Marlborough while awaiting news of her husband's safe return from the Battle of Blenheim, pressed the head of an expecting dam with her thumb, resulting in five puppies bearing the lucky mark after news that the battle had been won.

Black and Tan are dogs with black bodies with tan highlights, particularly eyebrows, cheeks, legs and beneath the tail. Black and Tan is referred to as "King Charles" in the King Charles Spaniel.

Ruby Cavaliers should be entirely chestnut, although some can have some white in their coats that is considered a fault under American Kennel Club conformation show rules.

The fourth colour is known as Tricolour, which is black and white with tan markings on cheeks, inside ears, on eyebrows, inside legs, and on underside of tail. This colour is referred to as "Prince Charles" in the King Charles Spaniel.

Rare all-black and so-called 'chocolate' varieties can arise naturally within litters but are not part of the breed standard in any jurisdiction.

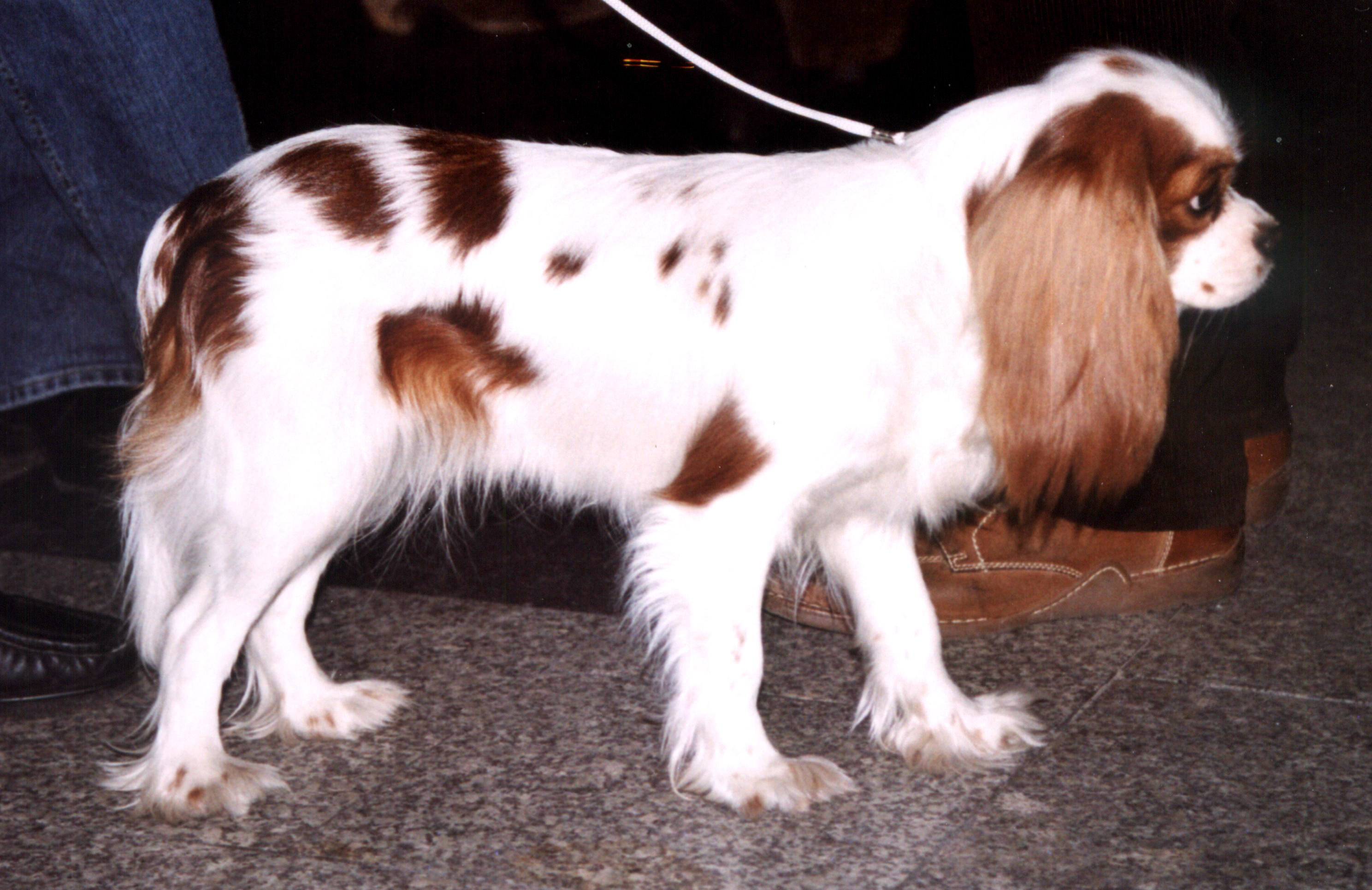
Rich chestnut markings on a white pearly coat

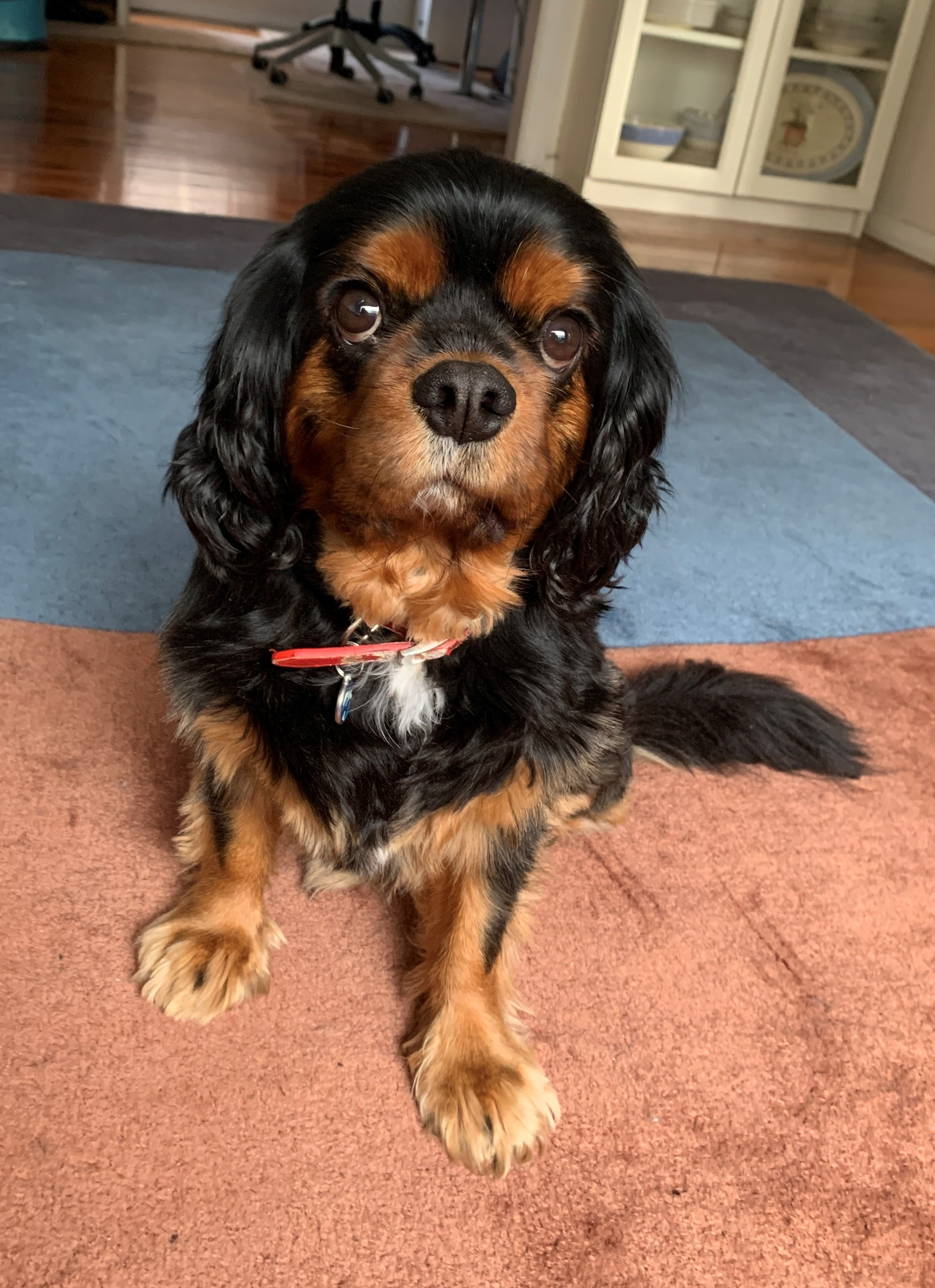
Black-and-tan Cavalier King Charles Spaniel

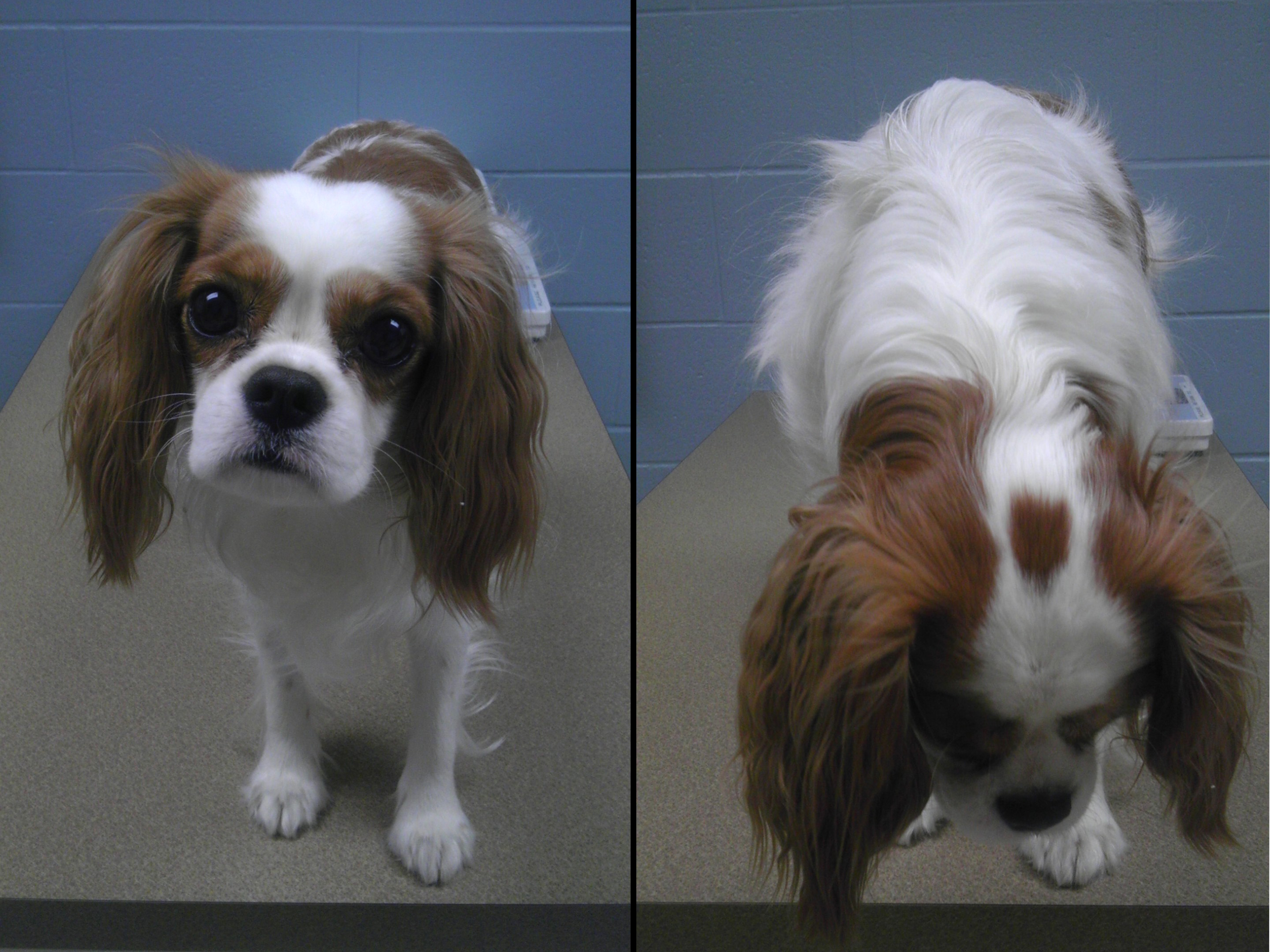
Front and top view of Blenheim Spot

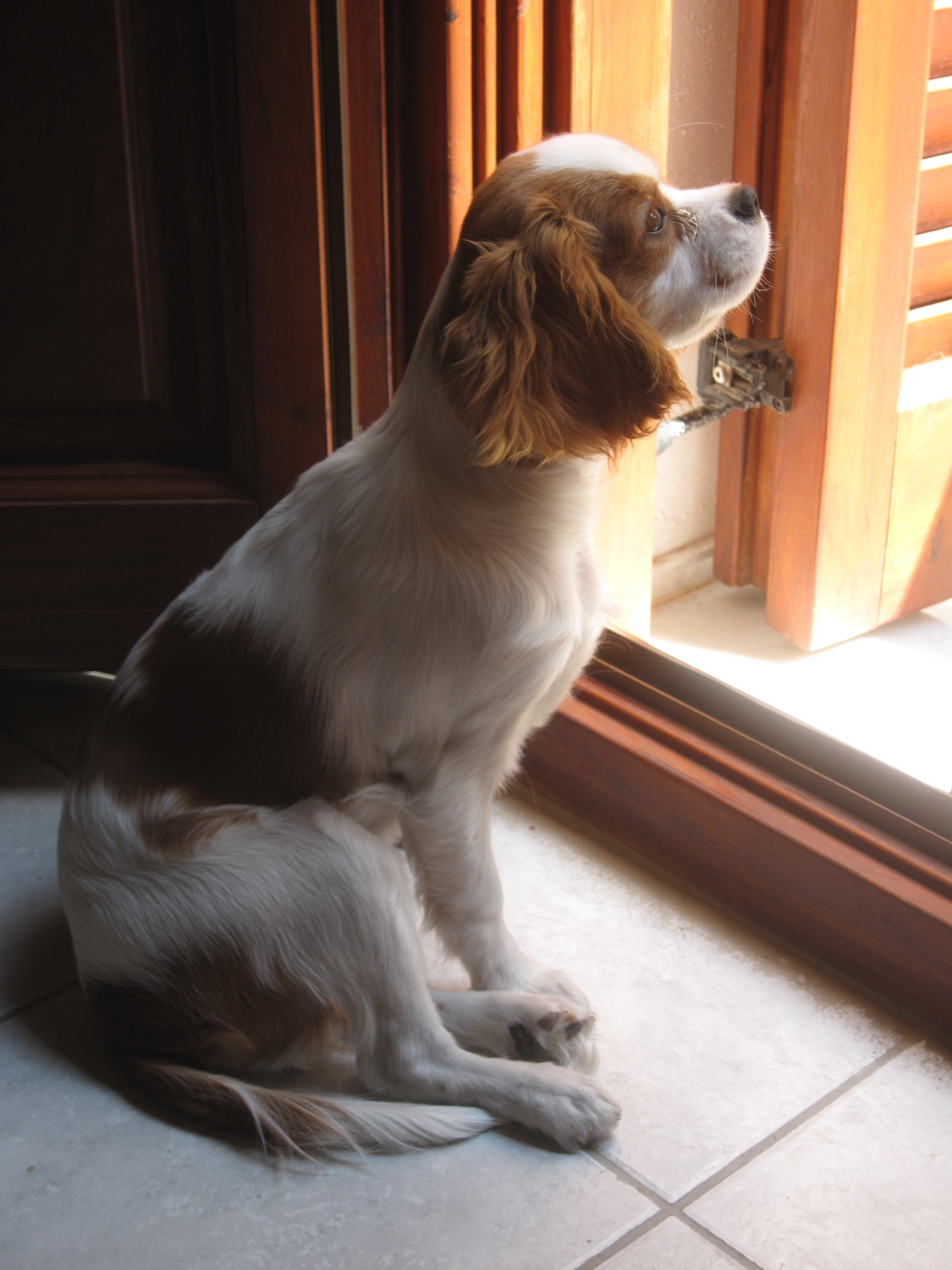
Cavalier King Charles Spaniel in the window

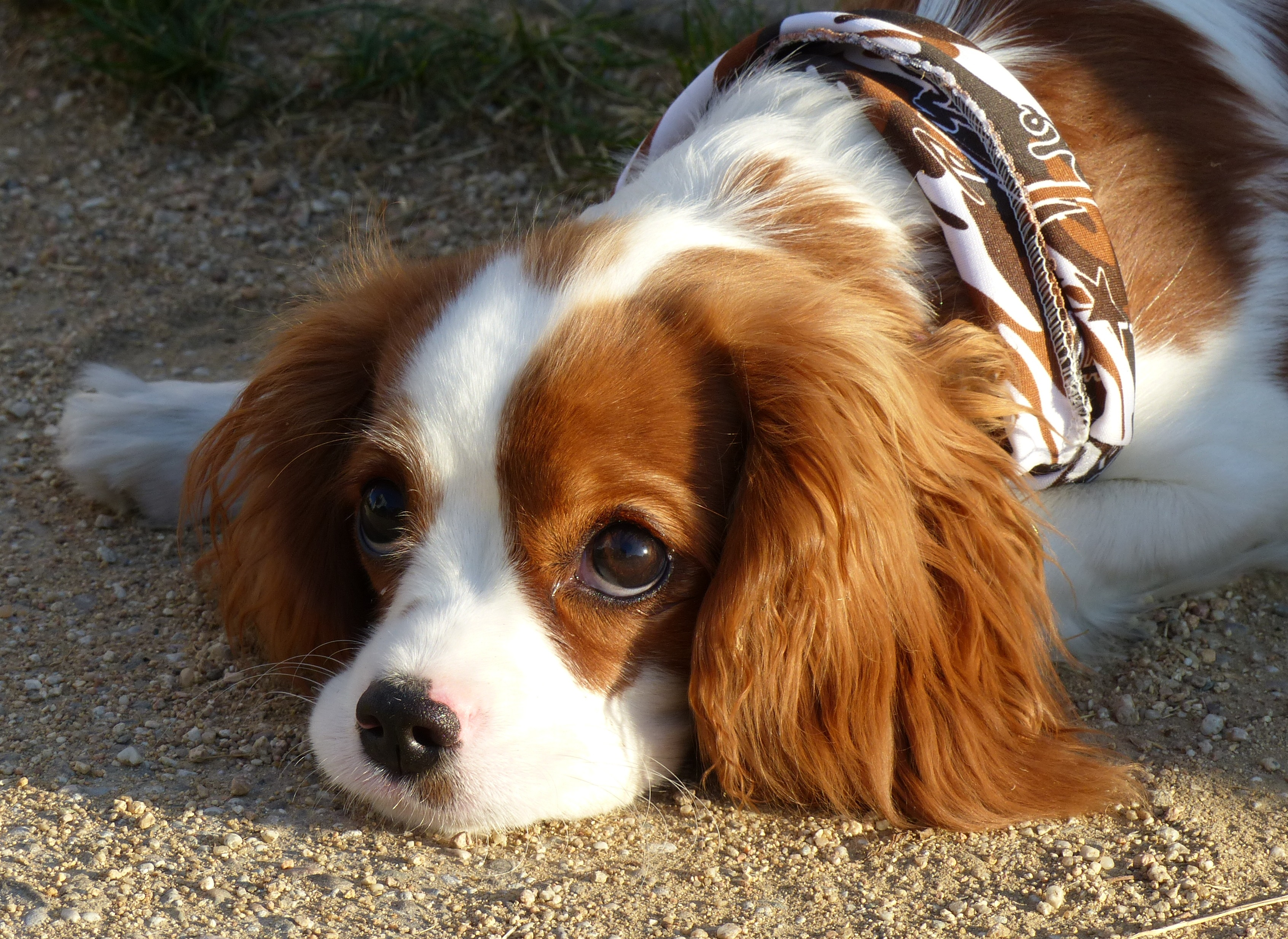
Portrait of a young female

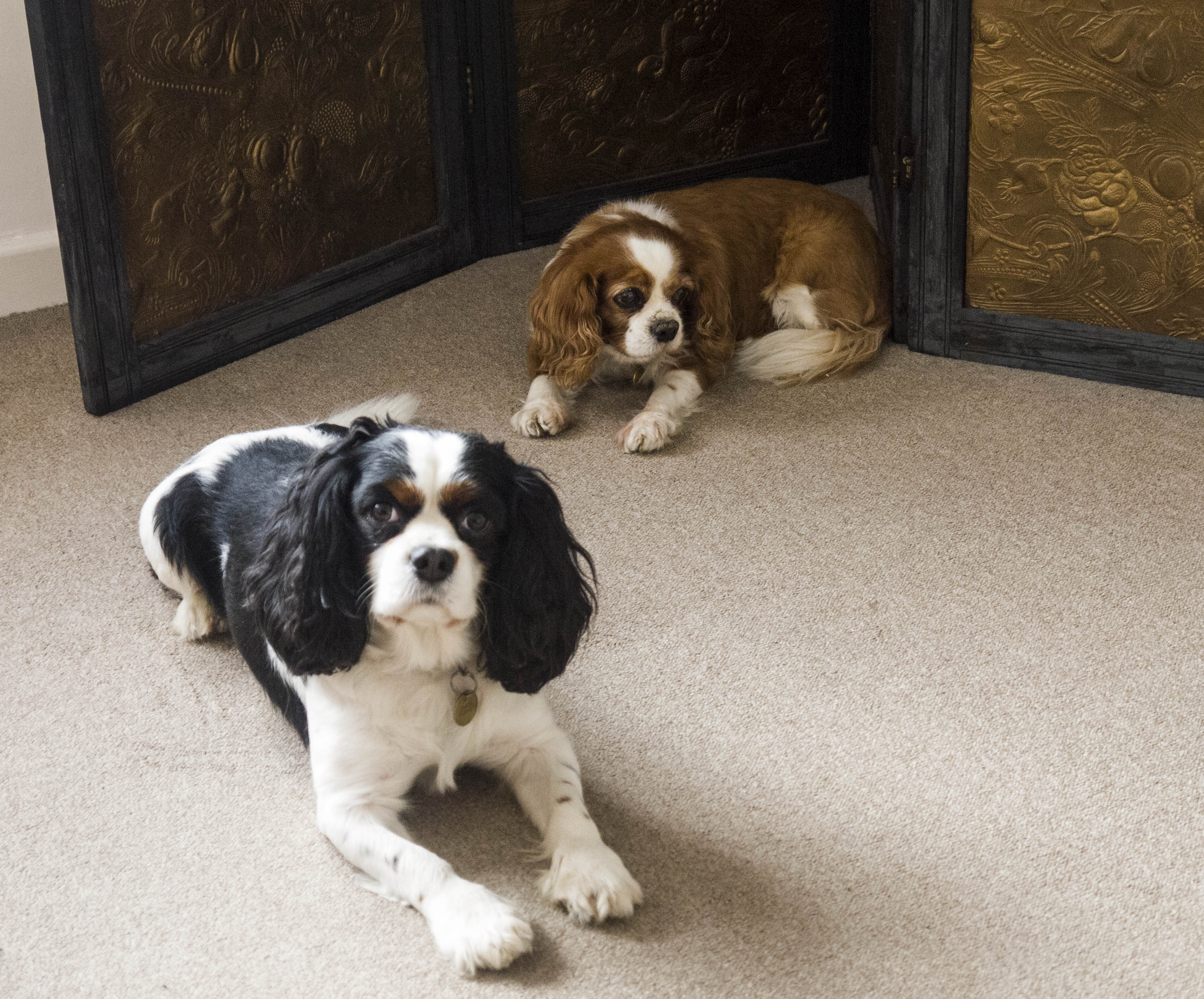
Tri-colour and Blenheim Cavalier King Charles Spaniels

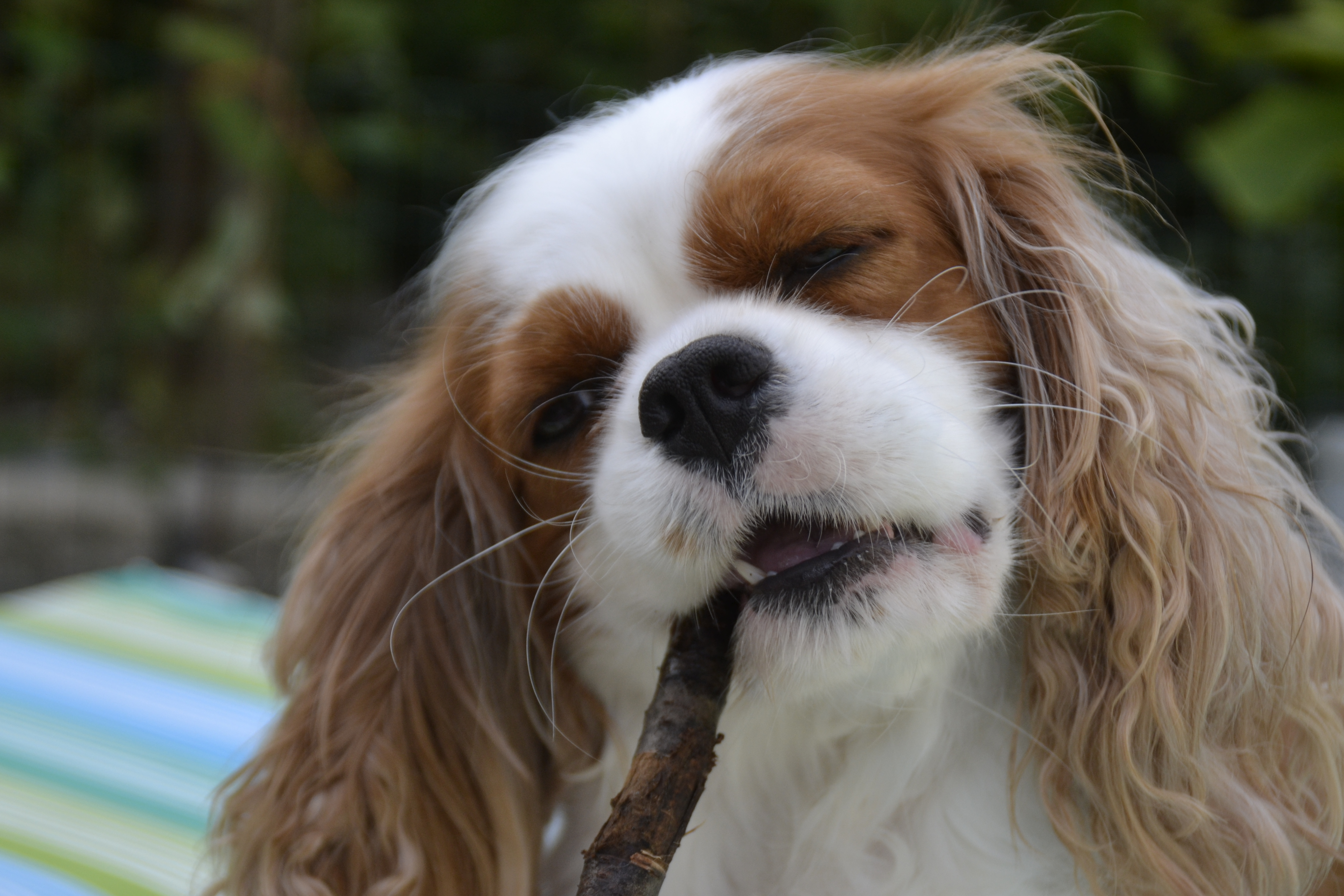
Cavalier chewing on a wooden stick

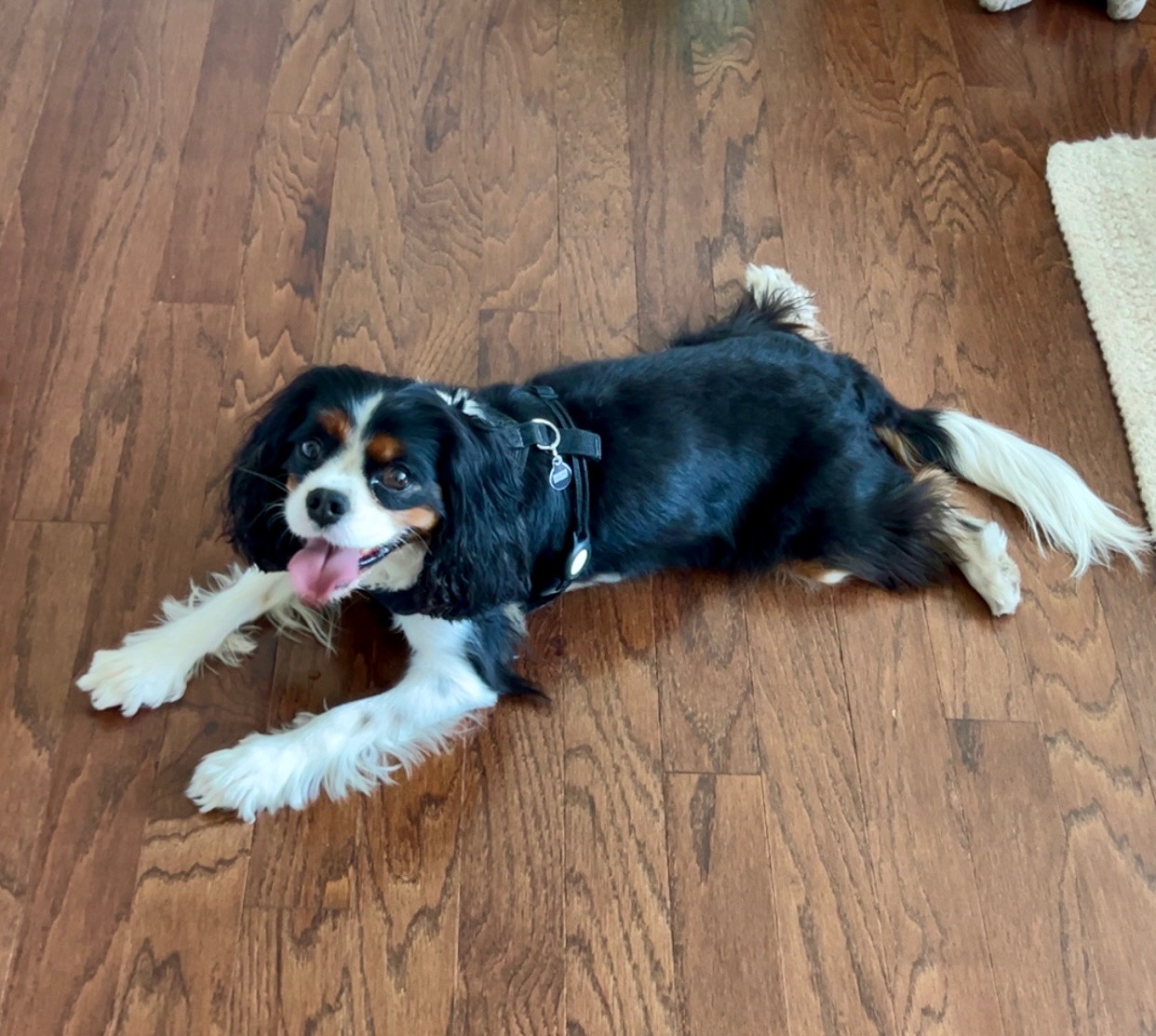
Blanket Top tri-color variant

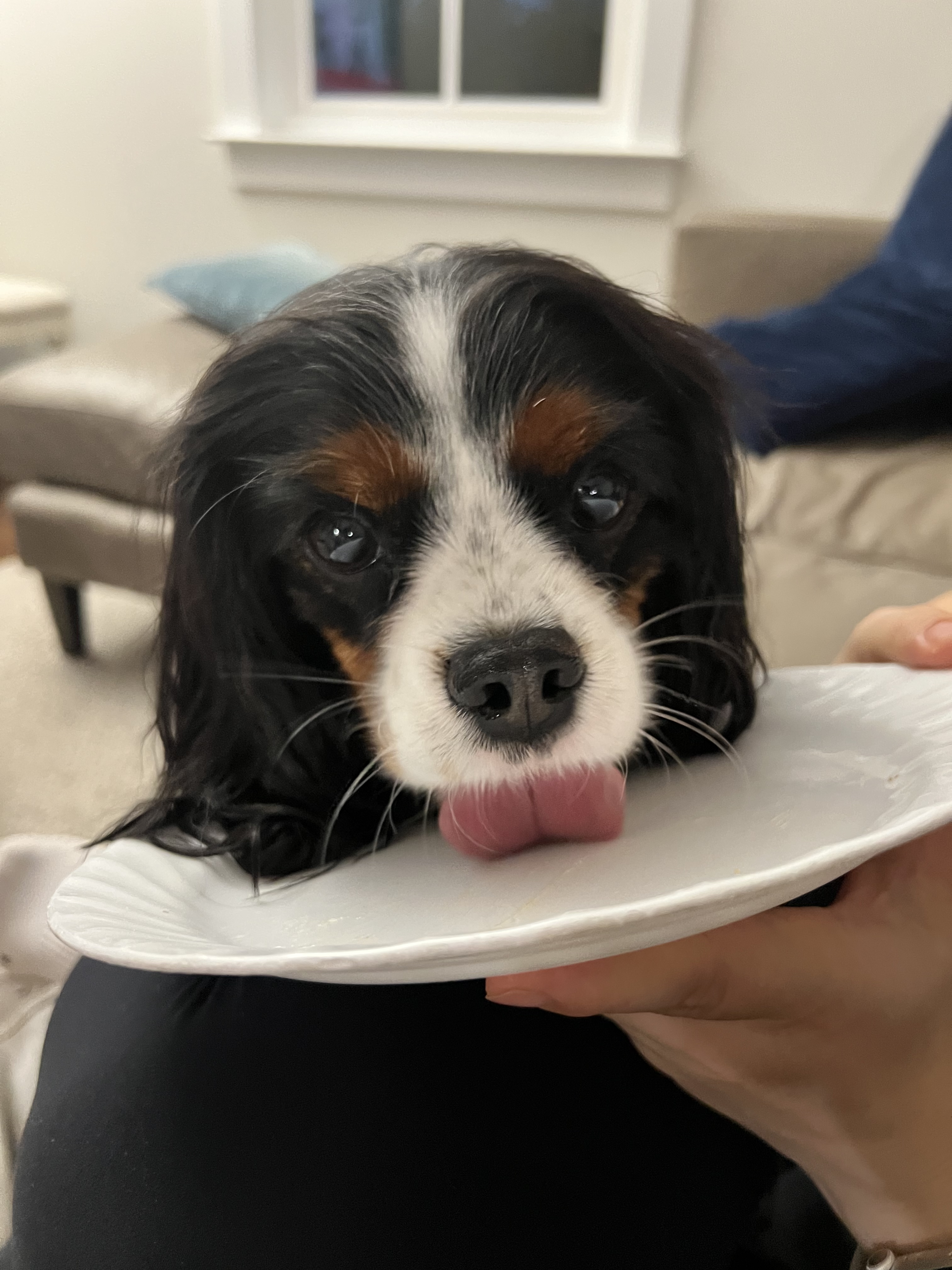
Color-defined eyebrows, specific to tri-color and black and tan variants.

=== Popularity ===
According to statistics released by The Kennel Club, Cavaliers were the 6th most popular dog in the United Kingdom in 2007 with 11,422 registrations in a single year. Their popularity is on the rise in America; in 1998 they were the 56th most popular breed but in both 2007 and 2008 they were the 25th most popular. They ranked higher in some individual US cities in the 2008 statistics: 8th in both Nashville and Minneapolis-St.Paul, 7th in Boston, Atlanta and Washington D.C., and 6th in both New York City and San Francisco. The breed's popularity has continued to grow, ranking in 14th place in 2022.

In 2009, the Cavalier was the 4th most popular breed in Australia with 3,196 registrations, behind only Labrador Retrievers, German Shepherd Dogs and Staffordshire Bull Terriers. In addition, there are also national breed clubs in Belgium, Canada, Czech Republic, Denmark, Finland, France, Germany, Netherlands, New Zealand, Norway, South Africa, Spain and Sweden. Today, Cavaliers are becoming a popular choice in cross breeding and are bred with other dogs such as poodles, though it should be acknowledged that these breeds are not purebred dogs eligible for registration under the AKC.

Cavaliers were among the pets of Princess Margaret and U.S. President Ronald Reagan, known for his Blenheim Cavalier named Rex. Cavaliers, such as Dash, were also the dog of choice for Queen Victoria.

== Temperament ==
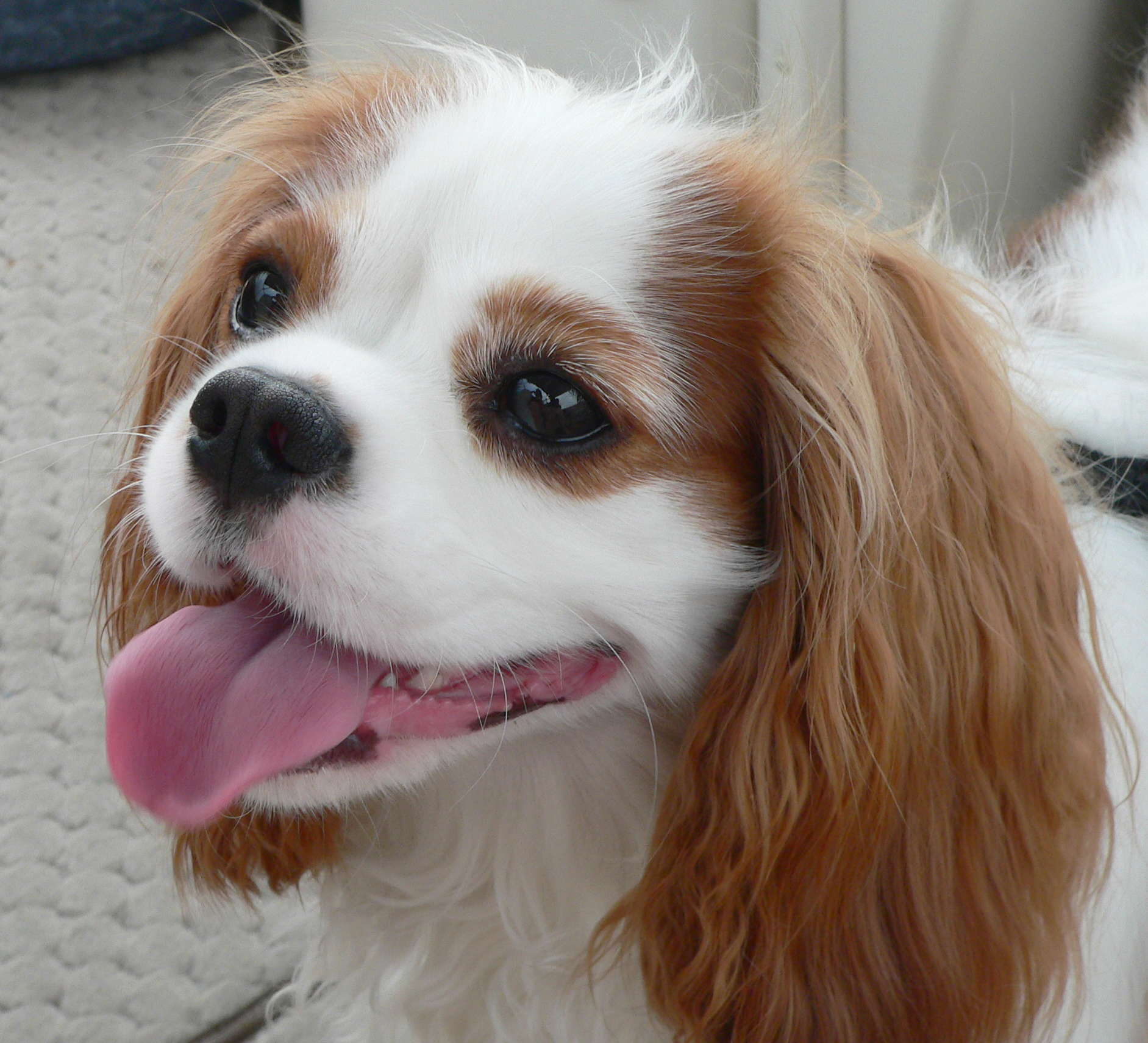
Blenheim markings

The breed is considered playful, patient and eager to please. As such, most dogs of the breed are good with children and other dogs, including larger dogs. They can adapt quickly to many environments, families, and locations and can suit both city and country life. Their ability to bond with larger and smaller dogs makes them a good choice for households with more than one breed. Cavaliers rank 44th in Stanley Coren's The Intelligence of Dogs, being of average intelligence in working or obedience. Cavaliers are said to be naturally curious and playful, but can also be calm companions or lap dogs, making them good companions or lap dogs for medical patients and the elderly.

Cavaliers are active and sporting. Cavaliers are successful in conformation shows, obedience and agility and are frequently used as therapy dogs due to their calm disposition.

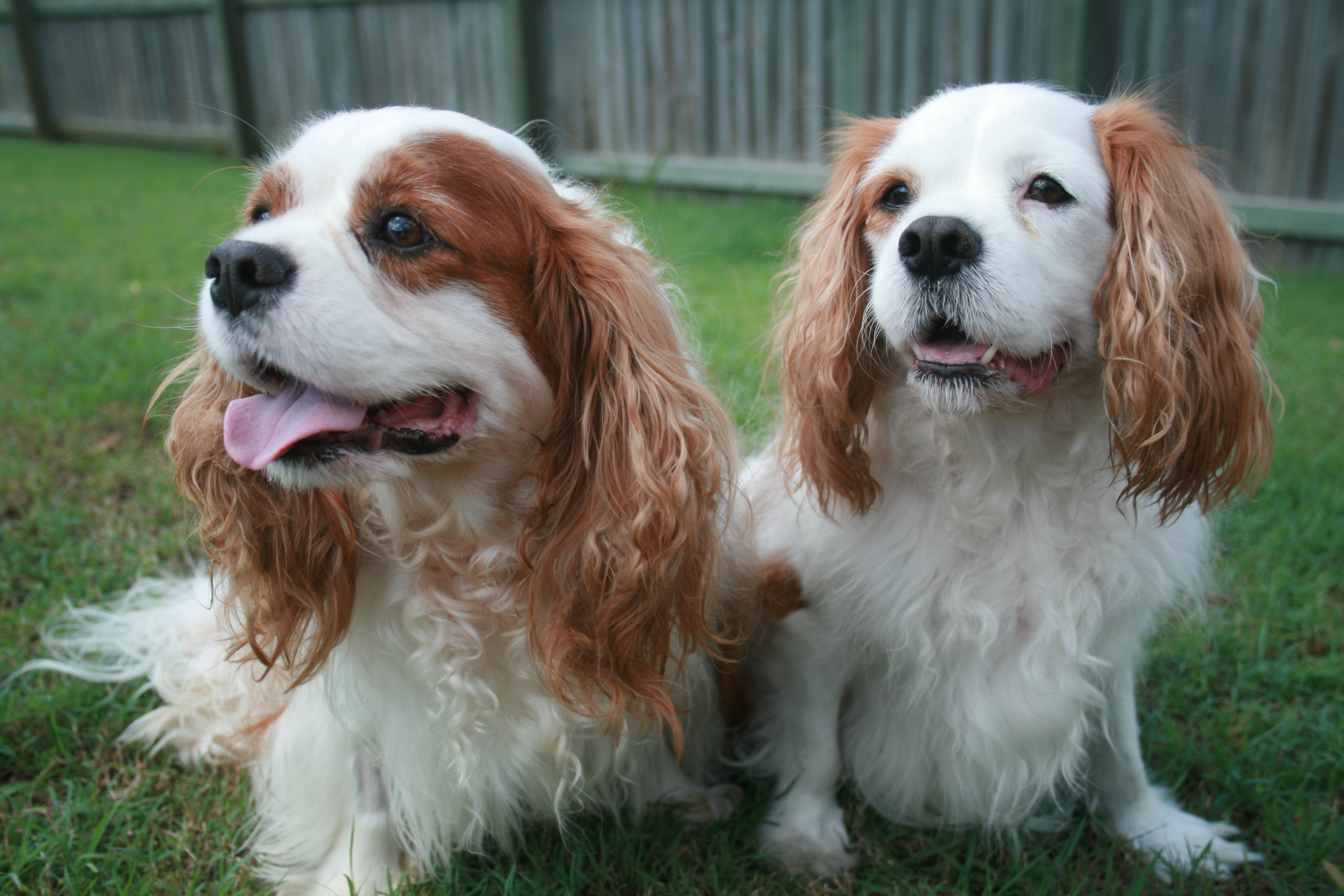
The breed is well known for its loving temperament.

They have an instinct to chase most things that move including vehicles on busy streets, and so most Cavaliers will never become "street-wise". As they tend to regard all strangers as friends, members of the breed will usually not make good guard dogs. Spaniels have a strong hunting instinct and may endanger birds and small animals. However, owners have reported that through training their Cavaliers live happily with a variety of small animals including hamsters and gerbils.

The Cavalier's coat requires weekly brushing, but no trimming. However, some owners prefer to trim their Cavalier's long feathers and slippers that can become very dirty when walking or playing outside.

== Health ==
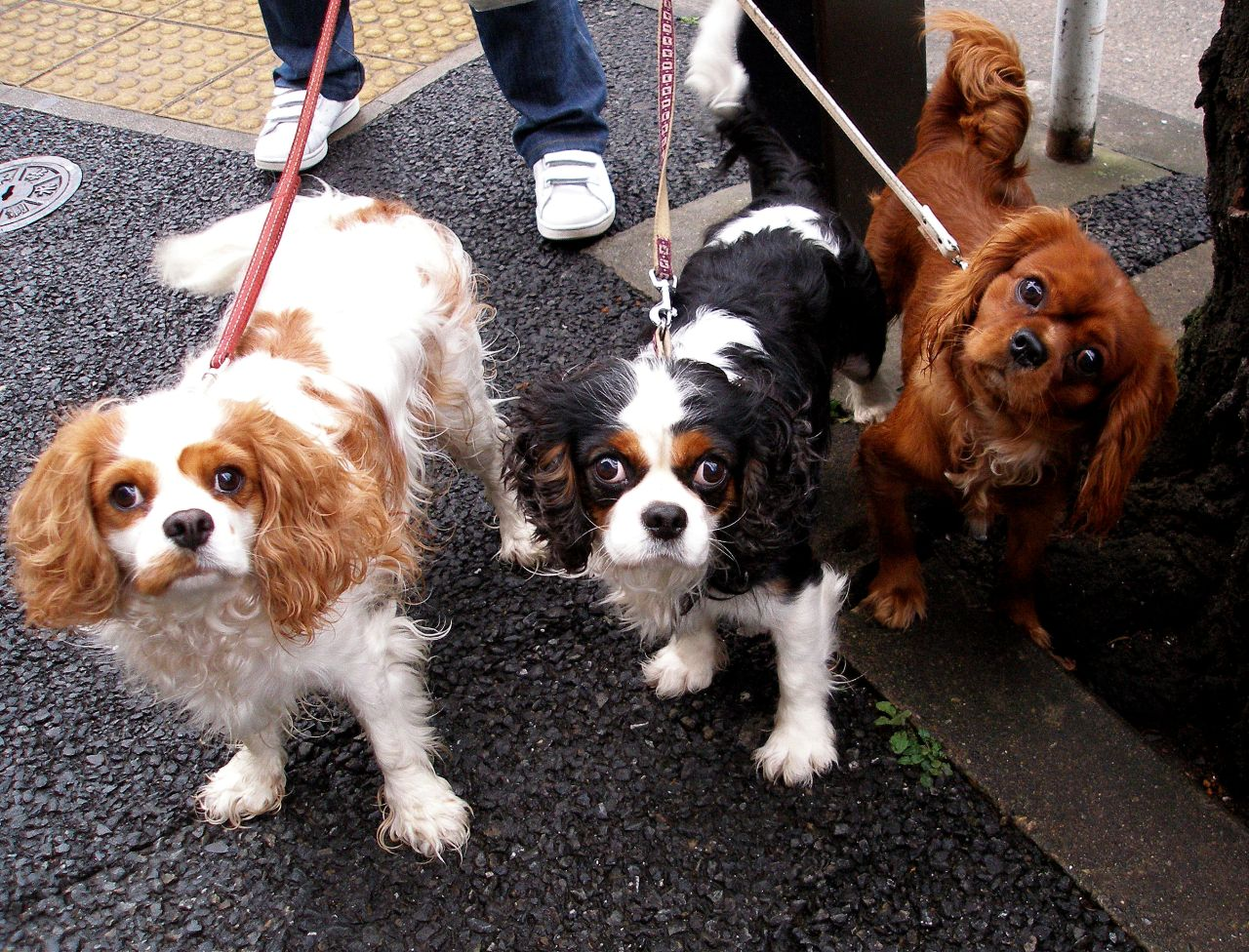
Three Cavalier King Charles Spaniels

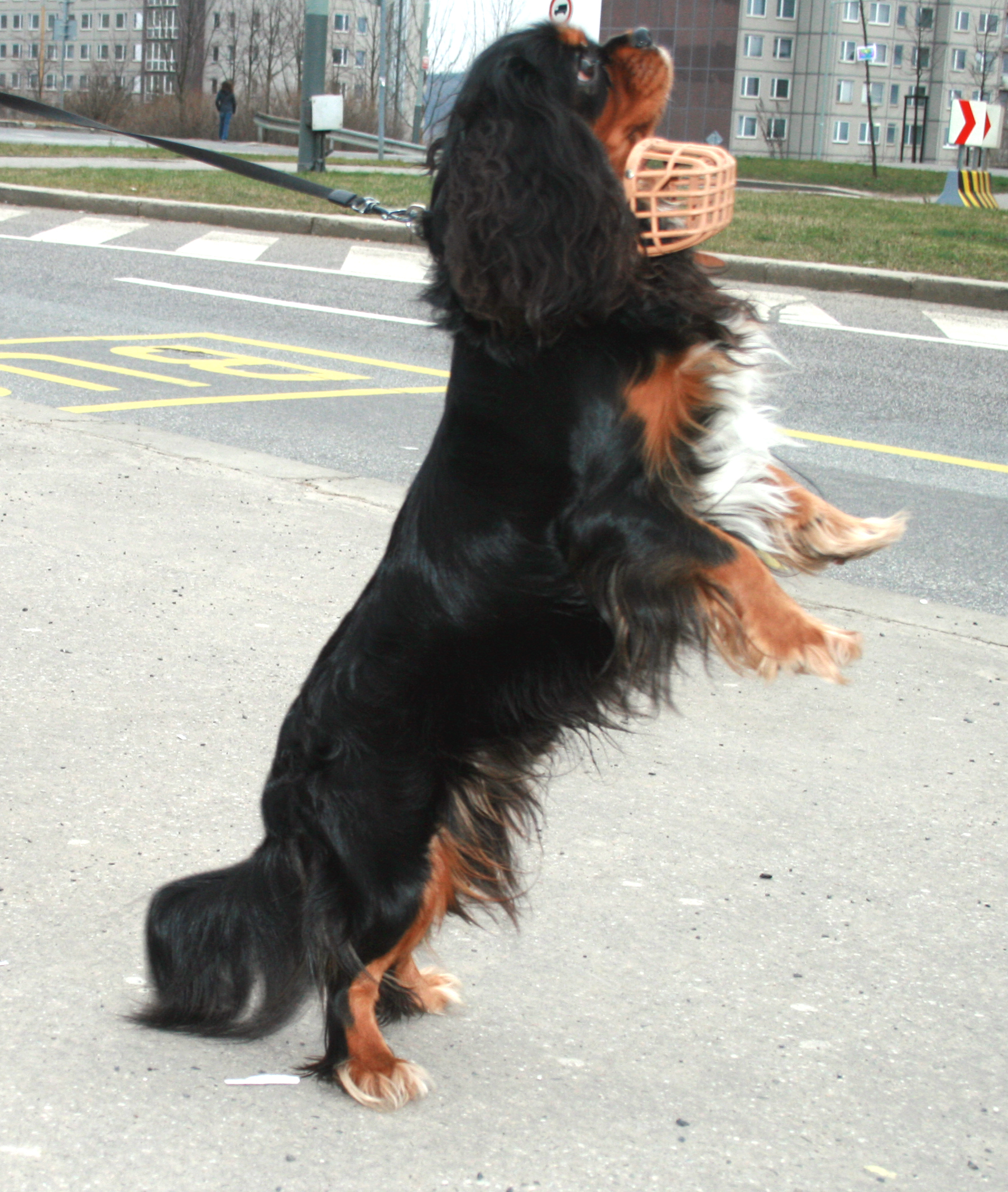
Black-and-tan Cavalier King Charles Spaniel

A 2022 UK study of veterinary data found a life expectancy of 10.45 years compared to 11.82 for crossbreeds. A 2024 UK study found a life expectancy of 11.8 years for the breed compared to an average of 12.7 for purebreeds and 12 for crossbreeds. A 2018 Japanese study of pet cemetery data found a life expectancy of 13.1 years compared to 15.1 for crossbreeds and 13.7 overall. A 2024 Italian study found a life expectancy of 10 years for the breed compared to 10 years overall. A 2005 Swedish study of insurance records found 48% of Cavalier King Charles Spaniels died by the age of 10, higher than the overall rate at 35% of dogs dying by the age of 10.

Cavaliers can be prone to mitral valve disease, which leads to heart failure. This appears in many Cavaliers at some point in their lives and is the most common cause of death. Some serious genetic health problems, including early-onset mitral valve disease (MVD), the potentially severely painful syringomyelia (SM), hip dysplasia, luxating patellas, and certain vision and hearing disorders are health problems for this breed. As today's Cavaliers all descend from a small number of dogs, as well as the genetic bottleneck arising from World War Two, any inheritable disease present in at least one of the original founding dogs can be passed on to a significant proportion of future generations. This is known as the founder effect and is the likely cause of the prevalence of MVD in the breed. Additionally, bad breeding increases the chance that a Cavalier will develop MVD, so it is important to find a responsible breeder who uses dogs with healthy hearts. The health problems shared with this breed include mitral valve disease, luxating patella, and hereditary eye issues such as cataracts and retinal dysplasia. Cavaliers are also affected by ear problems, a common health problem among spaniels of various types, and they can have such other general conditions as hip dysplasia, which are common across many types of dog breeds.

In 2022, the Oslo District Court banned the breeding of Cavalier King Charles spaniels in Norway due to their propensity for developing health problems. In its verdict the court judged that no dog of this breed could be considered healthy, therefore using them for breeding would be a violation of Norway's Animal Welfare Act.

=== Mitral valve disease ===
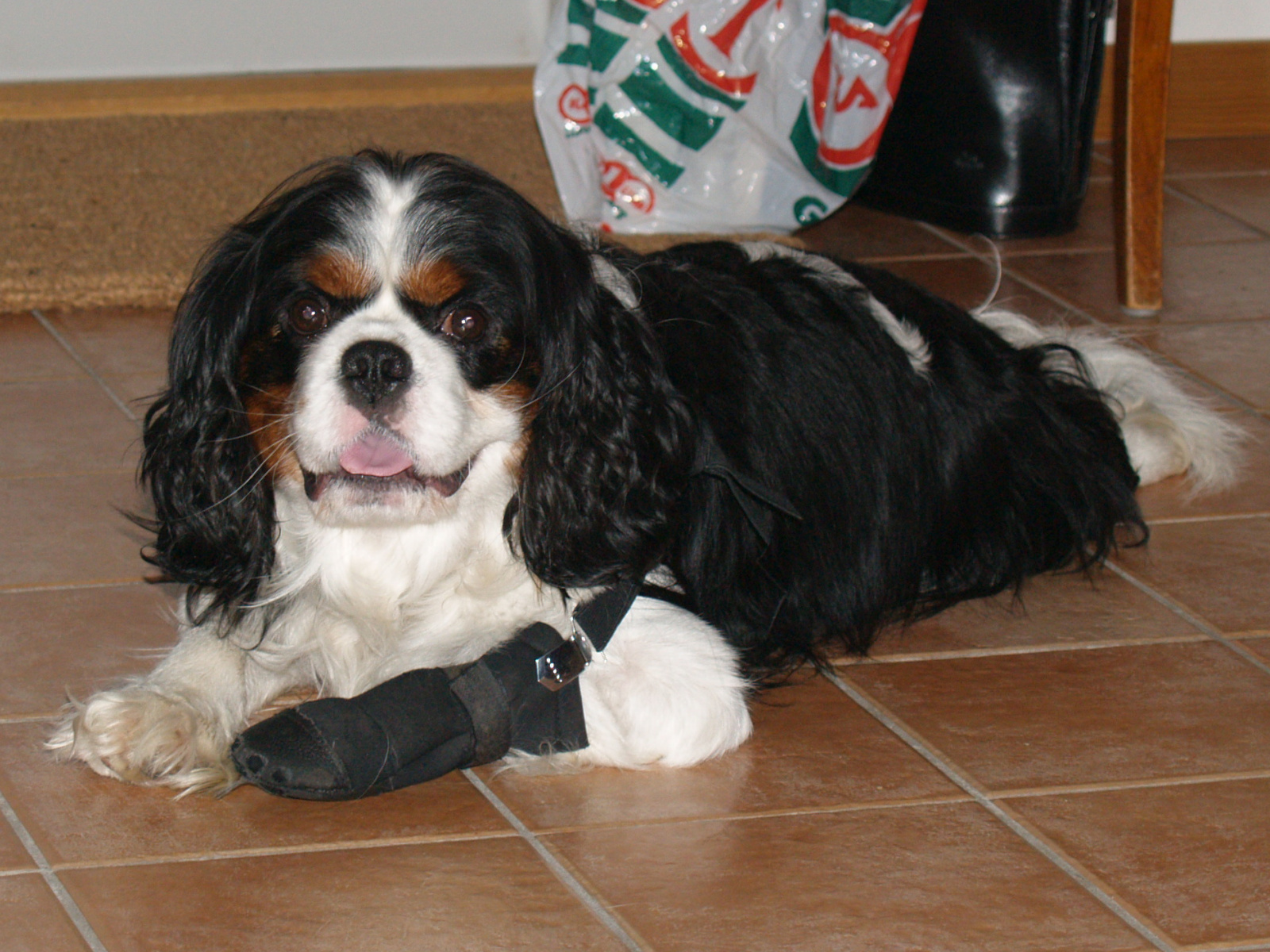
Cavalier King Charles Spaniel with bandaged paw

Nearly all Cavaliers eventually have mitral valve disease, with heart murmurs that may progressively worsen, leading to heart failure. This condition is polygenic (affected by multiple genes), and therefore all lines of Cavaliers worldwide are susceptible. It is the leading cause of death in the breed. A survey by The Kennel Club of the United Kingdom showed that 42.8% of Cavalier deaths are cardiac related. The next most common causes are cancer (12.3%) and old age (12.2%). The condition can begin to emerge at an early age and statistically may be expected to be present in more than half of all Cavalier King Charles Spaniels by age 5. It is rare for a 10-year-old Cavalier not to have a heart murmur. While heart disease is common in dogs generally – one in 10 of all dogs will eventually have heart problems – mitral valve disease is generally (as in humans) a disease of old age. The "hinge" on the heart's mitral valve loosens and can gradually deteriorate, along with the valve's flaps, causing a heart murmur (as blood seeps through the valve between heartbeats) then congestive heart failure. The Cavalier is particularly susceptible to early-onset heart disease, which may be evident in dogs as young as one or two years of age.

Veterinary geneticists and cardiologists have developed breeding guidelines to eliminate early-onset mitral valve disease in the breed, but it is unclear if a statistically significant number of breeders follow these guidelines. The chairperson of the UK CKCS Club said in 2009: "There are many members who are still not prepared to health check their breeding stock, and of those who do, it would appear that many would not hesitate to breed from affected animals." The MVD breeding protocol recommends that parents should be at least 2.5 years old and heart clear, and their parents (i.e., the puppy's grandparents) should be heart clear until age 5.

=== Syringomyelia ===
Syringomyelia (SM) is a condition affecting the brain and spine, causing symptoms ranging from mild discomfort to severe pain and partial paralysis. It is caused by a malformation, commonly known as Chiari malformation, in the lower back of the skull that reduces the space available to the brain, compressing it and often forcing it out (herniating it) through the opening into the spinal cord. This blocks the flow of cerebral spinal fluid (CSF) around the brain and spine and increases the fluid's pressure, creating turbulence that in turn is believed to create fluid pockets, or syrinxes (hence the term syringomyelia), in the spinal cord. Syringomyelia is rare in most breeds but has become widespread in the Cavalier King Charles Spaniel, with international research samples in the past few years consistently showing over 90% of Cavaliers have the malformation, and that between 30 and 70% have syrinxes. However, most dogs with syrinxes are not symptomatic. Although symptoms of syringomyelia can present at any age, they typically appear between six months and four years of age in 85% of symptomatic dogs, according to Clare Rusbridge, a research scientist. Symptoms include sensitivity around the head, neck, or shoulders, often indicated by a dog whimpering or frequently scratching at the area of his neck or shoulder. Scratching is often unilateral – restricted to one side of the body. Scratching motions are frequently performed without actually making physical contact with the body ("air scratching"). The scratching behaviour appears involuntary and the dog frequently scratches while walking – without stopping – in a way that is very atypical of normal scratching ("bunny hopping"). Scratching typical of SM is usually worse when the dog is wearing a collar, is being walked on a leash, or is excited, and first thing in the morning or at night.

Not all dogs who show scratching behaviour appear to be in pain, though several leading researchers, including Dr. Clare Rusbridge in the UK and Drs. Curtis Dewey and Dominic Marino in the US, believe scratching in SM Cavaliers is a sign of pain and discomfort and of existing neurological damage to the dorsal horn region of the spine. If onset is at an early age, a first sign may be scratching and/or rapidly appearing scoliosis. If the problem is severe, there is likely to be poor proprioception (awareness of body position), especially with regard to the forelimbs. Clumsiness and falling results from this problem. Progression is variable though the majority of dogs showing symptoms by age four tend to see progression of the condition.

A veterinarian will rule out basic causes of scratching or discomfort such as ear mites, fleas, and allergies, and then, primary secretory otitis media (PSOM – glue ear), as well as spinal or limb injuries, before assuming that a Cavalier has SM. PSOM can present similar symptoms but is much easier and less expensive to treat. Episodic Falling Syndrome can also present similar symptoms. An MRI scan is normally done to confirm diagnosis of SM (and also will reveal PSOM). If a veterinarian suspects SM he or she will recommend an MRI scan. Neurologists give scanned dogs a signed certificate noting its grade.

=== Episodic Falling (EF) ===
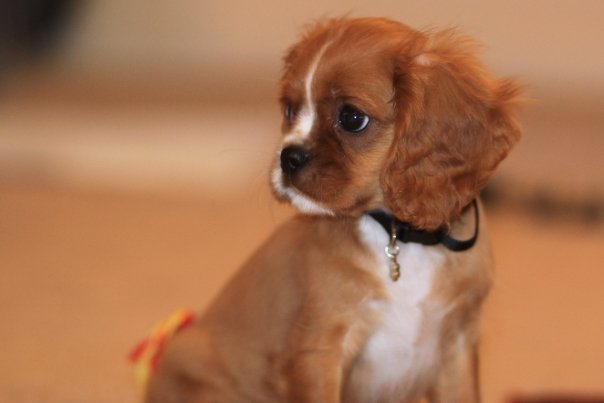
Ruby Cavalier King Charles Spaniel puppy

Episodic Falling causes "exercise-induced paroxysmal hypertonicity" meaning that there is increased muscle tone in the dog and the muscles cannot relax. Previously thought to be a muscular disorder, it is now known to be neurological. EF is caused by a single recessive gene, and a genetic test is available. Except for severe cases, episodes will be in response to exercise, excitement or similar exertions. Although EF is often misdiagnosed as epilepsy, which typically results in loss of consciousness, the dog remains conscious throughout the episode. Severity of symptoms can range from mild, occasional falling to freezing to seizure-like episodes lasting hours. Episodes can become more or less severe as the dog gets older and there is no standard pattern to the attacks. The onset of symptoms usually occurs when a dog is between 4 months and 4 years of age. It is similar to Scotty Cramp, a genetic disorder in Scottish Terriers. About 1% of Cavaliers are affected by the condition, with 19% being carriers. Dogs with whole coloured coats were more likely to be affected than dogs with parti-coloured coats.

=== Thrombocytopenia and macrothrombocytopenia ===
As many as half of all Cavalier King Charles Spaniels may have a congenital blood disorder called idiopathic asymptomatic thrombocytopenia, an abnormally low number of platelets in the blood, according to recent studies in Denmark and the United States. Platelets, or thrombocytes, are disk-shaped blood elements that aid in blood clotting. Excessively low numbers are the most common cause of bleeding disorders in dogs. The platelets in the blood of many Cavalier King Charles Spaniels are a combination of those of normal size for dogs and others that are abnormally oversized, or macrothrombocytes. Macrothrombocytosis is also a congenital abnormality found in at least a third of CKCSs. These large platelets function normally, and the typical Cavalier does not appear to experience any health problems due to either the size or fewer numbers of its platelets.

=== Hip and knee disorders ===
Hip dysplasia is a common genetic disease that affects Cavalier King Charles Spaniels. It is not present at birth but develops with age. Hip dysplasia is diagnosed by X-rays, but it is not usually evident in X-rays of Cavaliers until they mature. Even in adult spaniels with severe hip dysplasia, X-rays may not always indicate the disease. In a series of evaluations by the Orthopedic Foundation for Animals, the Cavalier was ranked 78th worst out of 157 breeds. The worst affected breeds were the Bulldog, Pug and Dogue de Bordeaux.

Cavaliers can be subject to a genetic defect of the femur and knee called luxating patella. This condition is most often observed when a puppy is 4 to 6 months old. In the most serious cases, surgery may be indicated. The grading system for the patella runs from 1 (a tight knee), to 4 (a knee so loose that its cap is easily displaced). If a Cavalier has a grade 1–2, physical rehabilitation therapy and exercise may reduce the grading and potentially avoid surgery. The grades 3–4 are most severe where surgery will most likely be needed to correct the problem to avoid the development of arthritis and lameness in the limb.

=== Eye problems ===
A disorder commonly found in Cavaliers is keratoconjunctivitis sicca, colloquially known as "dry eye". The usual cause of this condition is an autoimmune reaction against the dog's lacrimal gland (tear gland), reducing the production of tears. According to the Canine Inherited Disorders Database, the condition requires continual treatment and if untreated may result in partial or total blindness. This disorder can decrease or heal over time.

A 1999 study of Cavaliers conducted by the Canine Eye Registration Foundation showed that an average of 30% of all Cavalier King Charles Spaniels evaluated had eye problems. They include hereditary cataracts, corneal dystrophy, distichiasis, entropion, microphthalmia, progressive retinal atrophy, and retinal dysplasia.

=== Ear disorders ===
Primary Secretory Otitis Media (PSOM), also known as glue ear, consists of a highly viscous mucus plug that fills the dog's middle ear and may cause the tympanic membrane to bulge. PSOM has been reported almost exclusively in Cavaliers, and it may affect over half of them. Because the pain and other sensations in the head and neck areas, resulting from PSOM, are similar to some symptoms caused by syringomyelia (SM), some examining veterinarians have mis-diagnosed SM in Cavaliers that actually have PSOM and not SM.

Cavalier King Charles Spaniels may be predisposed to a form of congenital deafness, which is present at birth, due to a lack of formation or early degeneration of receptors in the inner ear, although this is relatively rare. In addition, more recent studies have found Cavaliers that develop a progressive hearing loss, which usually begins during puppy-hood and progresses until the dog is completely deaf, usually between the ages of three and five years. The progressive nature of this form of deafness in Cavaliers is believed to be caused by degeneration of the hearing nerve rather than the lack of formation or early degeneration of the inner ear receptors.

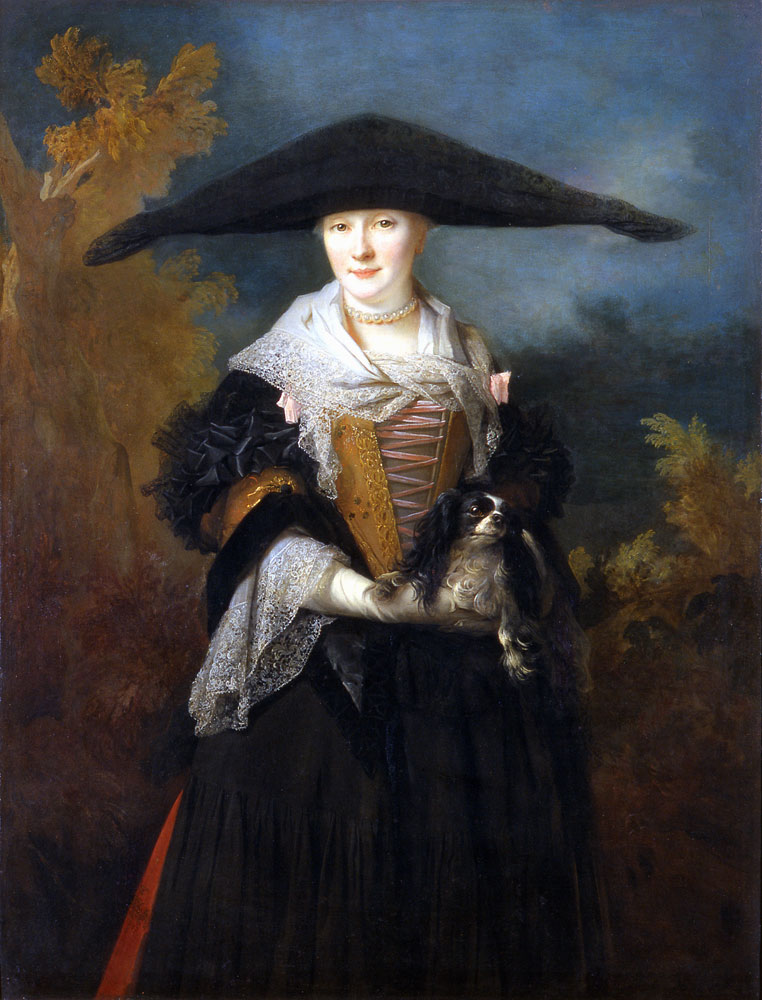
La belle Strasbourgeoise holding a long-nosed King Charles Spaniel, the basis for the modern CKCS.

== Urban legend ==
An urban legend claims that Charles II issued a special decree granting King Charles Spaniels permission to enter any establishment in the UK, overriding "no dog except guide dogs" rules. A variant of this myth relates specifically to the Houses of Parliament. This myth is sometimes instead applied to the Cavalier King Charles Spaniel.

The UK Parliament website states: "Contrary to popular rumour, there is no Act of Parliament referring to King Charles spaniels being allowed anywhere in the Palace of Westminster. We are often asked this question and have thoroughly researched it." Similarly, there is no proof of any such law covering the wider UK. A spokesman for the Kennel Club said: "This law has been quoted from time to time. It is alleged in books that King Charles made this decree but our research hasn't tracked it down."

== See also ==
- Companion dog
- Companion Dog Group
- Toy Group
