= Corneal dystrophies in dogs =

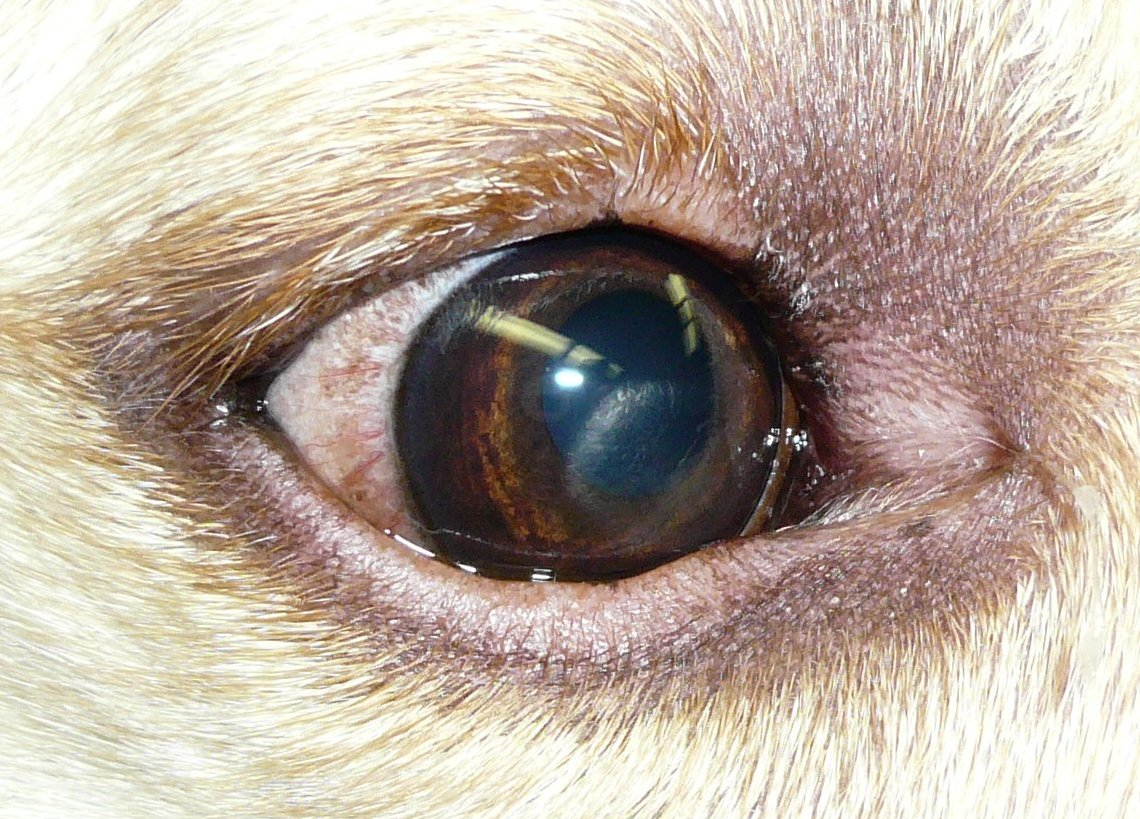
Corneal dystrophy in a dog

Corneal dystrophies are a group of diseases that affect the cornea in dogs.

== Treatment ==
Corneal dystrophy in dogs usually does not cause any problems and treatment is not required. Suboptimal vision caused by corneal dystrophy usually requires surgical intervention in the form of corneal transplantation. Penetrating keratoplasty is commonly performed for extensive corneal dystrophy.

== Corneal endothelial dystrophy ==
Corneal endothelial dystrophy is an age-related change that affects the inner layer of the corneal, the endothelium. Leakage of fluid into the cornea causes edema, causing a bluish appearance. This will eventually involve the whole cornea. Bullous keratopathy (blisters in the cornea) may also form, leading to nonhealing and recurrent corneal ulceration. Hyperosmotic agents are sometimes used topically for treatment, but success with these medications is inconsistent and can cause irritation. Bad cases may require a corneal transplant or thermokeratoplasty, which is a grid of superficial burns to the cornea that causes anterior stromal fibers to contract and prevent fluid uptake by the stroma. The most commonly affected breeds are the Boston Terrier, Chihuahua, and Dachshund. The age of onset in the Boston is five to nine years and eight to thirteen years in the Chihuahua and Dachshund. The disease is similar to Fuchs' dystrophy in humans.

== Commonly affected breeds ==
Many breeds are affected by corneal dystrophy with many different appearances. These breeds most commonly have these criteria.

- Afghan Hound
- Airedale Terrier - occurs at 4 to 12 months of age in the central cornea. It is progressive and can cause decreased vision.
- Alaskan Malamute - occurs at greater than two years of age in the central cornea.
- Beagle – has a nebular, race track, or arcing appearance.
- Bearded Collie – occurs at greater than one year of age in the lateral or central cornea and can affect just one eye.
- Bichon Frise – occurs at greater than two years of age in the inferior or central cornea.
- Boxer – occurs at greater than two years in the central cornea
- Cavalier King Charles Spaniel – occurs at two to four years of age in the central cornea.
- American Cocker Spaniel
- Rough Collie – occurs at one to four years of age in the inferior or central cornea.
- English Toy Spaniel – occurs at two to five years of age and has a crystalline, circular appearance.
- German Shepherd Dog – occurs at one to six years of age and is usually oval.
- Golden Retriever – occurs at less than two years of age and can be progressive.
- Italian Greyhound – occurs in young dogs and is focal.
- Lhasa Apso – oval appearance.
- Mastiff – oval appearance.
- Miniature Pinscher – occurs at one to two years of age and is oval.
- Norwich Terrier – peripheral cornea.
- Pembroke Welsh Corgi – occurs in young dogs and can include blood vessels and pigmentation.
- Pointer – gray, hazy ring.
- Poodle – occurs at greater than one year of age.
- Samoyed – occurs at six months to two years of age and is gray and round.
- Shetland Sheepdog – occurs at two to four years of age as multiple gray/white rings. It can develop into a corneal ulcer.
- Siberian Husky – occurs at five months to two years of age and is gray and oval.
- Weimaraner – occurs at one to eight years of age in the central cornea.
- Whippet – occurs at three to five years of age in the central cornea.
