= Toy Trawler Spaniel =

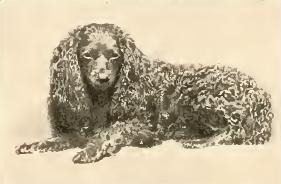
- A Toy Trawler Spaniel from 1909
- Other names: Miniature Trawler Spaniel
- Origin: United Kingdom
- Breed status: Extinct

The Toy Trawler Spaniel is an extinct breed of Spaniel which physically was similar to the King Charles Spaniel of the 16th century. It is considered to have descended from the original King Charles Spaniel, and the older variety of the Sussex Spaniel. It was employed as a sports dog first before becoming a toy and show dog. It was considered to be on the verge of extinction by 1920. A preserved specimen is kept in Tring at the Natural History Museum.

== History ==
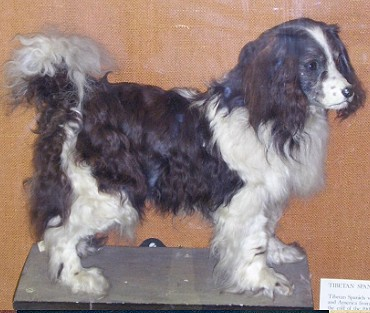
Toy Trawler Spaniel, Rothschild Zoological Museum, Tring, England

The specific origin of the breed is unknown, but in 1919, it was thought to have been descended from the originally curly-coated King Charles Spaniel and the old-fashioned curly-coated Sussex Spaniel. Its original purpose may have been as a sporting dog, but it became more frequently used as a toy dog. By 1907, the breed was more popular in mainland Europe than in the U.K., especially in the Netherlands and Italy.

There is a preserved specimen at the Natural History Museum at Tring. Named Robin, it was bred by Lady Wentworth and was born in 1911. It died in 1920 when the breed was said to be "nearly extinct". Lady Wentworth wrote about using Toy Trawler Spaniels to re-breed the original King Charles Spaniel in her book Toy Dogs and Their Ancestors Including the History And Management of Toy Spaniels, Pekingese, Japanese and Pomeranians, published under the name of the "Hon. Mrs. Neville Lytton" in 1911.

== Description ==
The Toy Trawler Spaniel was considered to be a throwback to the original King Charles Spaniel. The head was small and light, with an upwards tip on its short black nose. The top of the skull was flat and not dome-shaped, and had long ears set forward. Its coat was generally feathered quite long and was described as curly but not woolly, and its body was quite solidly built.

Its height was variable, ranging from 11–13 inches (28–33 cm) at the withers, although examples were given at 9 inches (23 cm), with proportionate weight given for a 13 inches (33 cm) high dog weighing 15 pounds (6.8 kg).

The preferred colour was black with a white waistcoat, then red with a white waistcoat, but they also came in black and white and red and white. They were described as being very sweet, but also very bold and courageous, with timidity considered to be a fault in the show ring.
