= The Family of Queen Victoria (1887) =

Painting by Laurits Tuxen

The Family of Queen Victoria in 1887
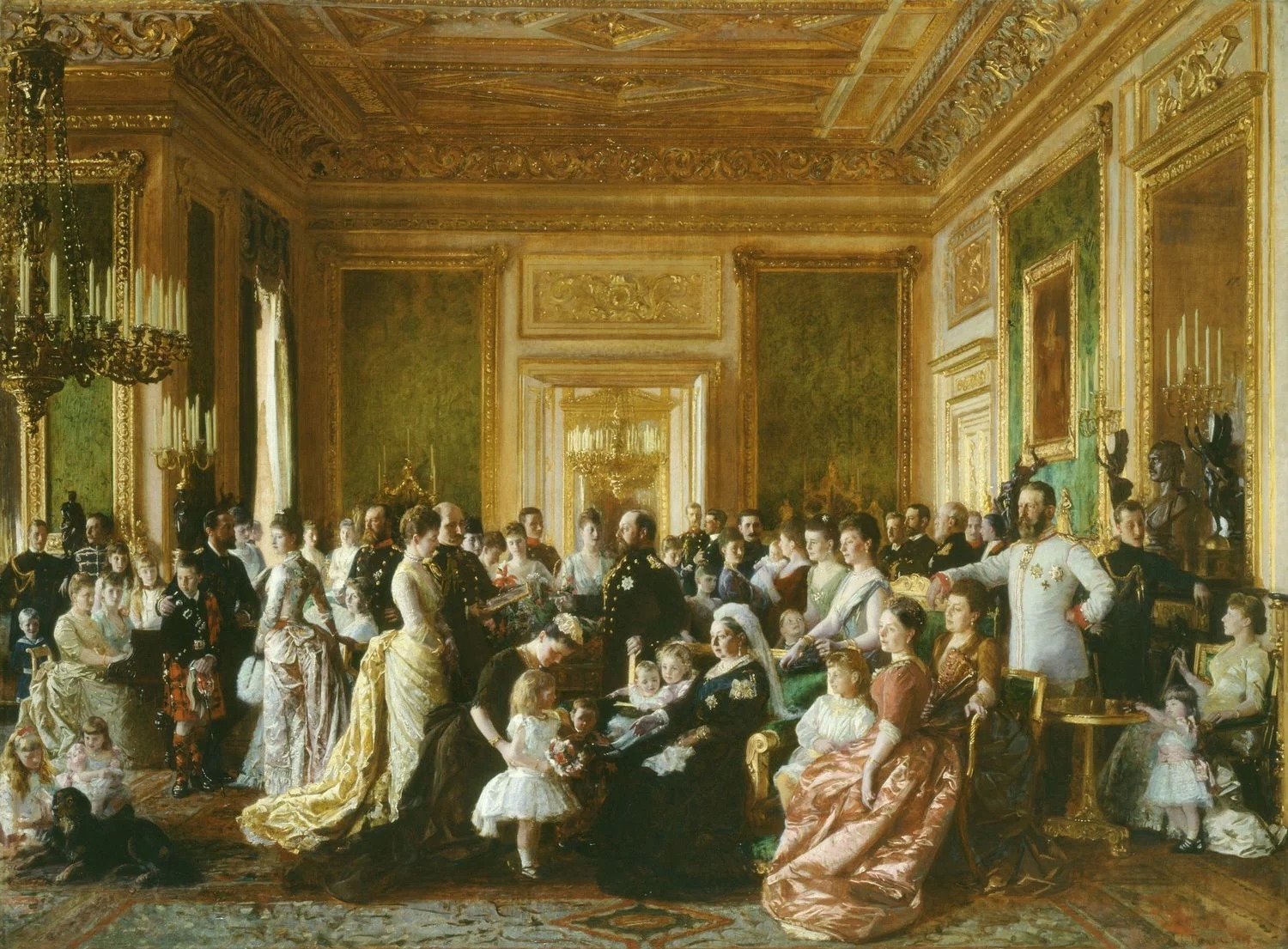
- Artist: Laurits Tuxen
- Year: 1887
- Medium: oil on canvas
- Dimensions: 165,5 cm × 226 cm (652 in × 89 in)

The Family of Queen Victoria in 1887 is an oil painting by the Danish painter Laurits Tuxen, commissioned by Queen Victoria to commemorate her Golden Jubilee. It depicts the queen and her descendants, gathered in the Green Drawing Room of Windsor Castle. The painting is currently on display at the King's Gallery at Buckingham Palace.

== Background ==
Queen Victoria's family occupied a central place in her life. She maintained close relationships with many of her children and grandchildren, something notable given the large number of her descendants—she had nine children and forty-two grandchildren. Throughout the year, they were often summoned to visit her at Balmoral or Windsor. This "obligation" became even more emphatic at moments of great significance, such as the queen's Golden Jubilee, celebrated in 1887.

An admirer of the portrait that Tuxen had painted of the family of the King and Queen of Denmark, the monarch desired a similar record of her own family and therefore commissioned a work whose composition would not be rigid or strictly governed by court etiquette, but instead arranged as a harmonious and graceful grouping.

== Production ==
Tuxen faced several challenges in portraying the queen's large family. The Princess of Wales, born a Danish princess, was not sympathetic to the German branch of the family, to which Queen Victoria's eldest daughter had married, largely due to the recent conflict between Germany and Denmark (the Second Schleswig War). For this reason, she expressed a desire not to be depicted close to the German emperor, affectionately known as "Fritz". Consequently, he is positioned at the far right of the composition, at a considerable distance from both the princess and her husband, the Prince of Wales. The latter, although situated near the seated queen, is turned with his back toward the emperor. The Duke of Connaught, for his part, stated that he would rather be left out of the portrait than be placed near the Battenbergs, a family resulting from a morganatic marriage, whose son was married to the queen's youngest daughter, Princess Beatrice.

== Description ==
Queen Victoria is seated in the Green Drawing Room of Windsor Castle, surrounded by members of her family. Above the fireplace is a bronze bust of Prince Albert.

== See also ==
- The Family of Christian IX of Denmark
