= Queen Victoria =

Queen of the United Kingdom from 1837 to 1901

Victoria
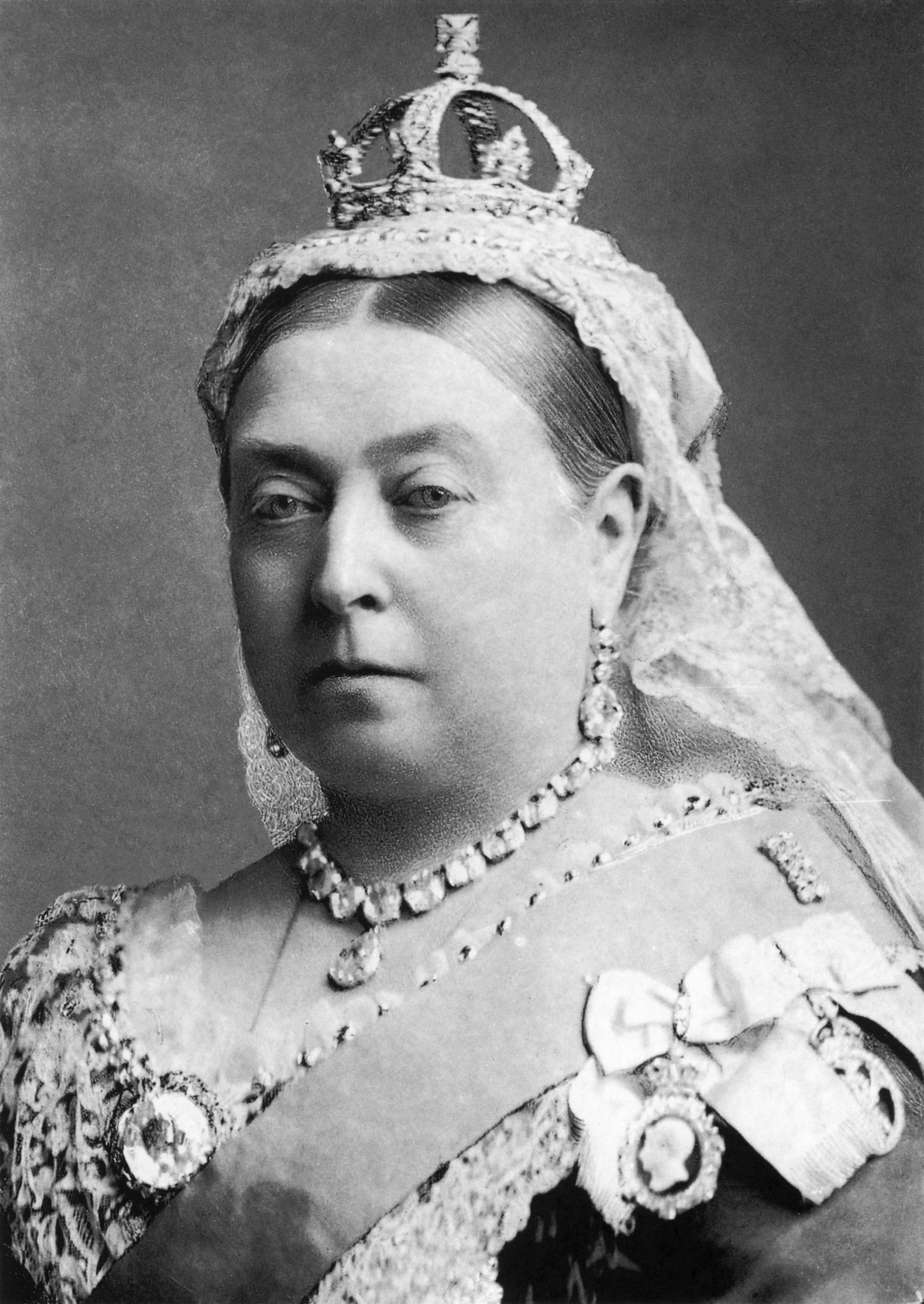
- Formal portrait, 1882

Queen of the United Kingdom
- Reign: 20 June 1837 – 22 January 1901
- Coronation: 28 June 1838
- Predecessor: William IV
- Successor: Edward VII

Empress of India
- Reign: 1 May 1876 – 22 January 1901
- Imperial Durbar: 1 January 1877
- Predecessor: Position established
- Successor: Edward VII
- Born: Princess Alexandrina Victoria of Kent; 24 May 1819; Kensington Palace, London, England
- Died: 22 January 1901 (aged 81); Osborne House, Isle of Wight, England
- Burial: 4 February 1901; Royal Mausoleum, Frogmore, Windsor
- Spouse: Prince Albert of Saxe-Coburg and Gotha (m. 1840; died 1861)
- Issue Detail: Victoria, German Empress; Edward VII; Alice, Grand Duchess of Hesse and by Rhine; Alfred, Duke of Saxe-Coburg and Gotha; Helena, Princess Christian of Schleswig-Holstein; Princess Louise, Duchess of Argyll; Prince Arthur, Duke of Connaught and Strathearn; Prince Leopold, Duke of Albany; Beatrice, Princess Henry of Battenberg
- House: Hanover
- Father: Prince Edward, Duke of Kent and Strathearn
- Mother: Princess Victoria of Saxe-Coburg-Saalfeld
- Religion: Protestant (Note: As monarch, Victoria was Supreme Governor of the Church of England. She was also aligned with the Church of Scotland.)

Victoria (Alexandrina Victoria; 24 May 1819 – 22 January 1901) was Queen of the United Kingdom of Great Britain and Ireland from 20 June 1837 until her death in 1901. Her reign of 63 years and 216 days, which was longer than those of any of her predecessors, constituted the Victorian era, a period of industrial, political, scientific, and military change within the United Kingdom marked by a great expansion of the British Empire. In 1876, the British parliament voted to grant her the additional title of Empress of India.

Victoria was the daughter of Prince Edward, Duke of Kent and Strathearn, who was the fourth son of King George III. After the deaths of her father and grandfather in 1820, she was raised under close supervision by her mother, Princess Victoria of Saxe-Coburg-Saalfeld, and her comptroller, John Conroy. She inherited the throne aged 18 after her father's three elder brothers died without surviving legitimate issue. Victoria attempted privately to influence government policy and ministerial appointments; publicly, she became a national icon who was identified with strict standards of personal morality.

Victoria married her maternal first cousin, Prince Albert of Saxe-Coburg and Gotha, in 1840. Their nine children married into royal and noble families across the continent, earning Victoria the sobriquet "grandmother of Europe". After Albert's death in 1861, Victoria plunged into deep mourning and avoided public appearances. As a result of her seclusion, British republicanism temporarily gained strength, but in the latter half of her reign, her popularity recovered. Her Golden and Diamond jubilees were times of public celebration. Victoria died at Osborne House on the Isle of Wight, at the age of 81. The last British monarch of the House of Hanover, she was succeeded by her son Edward VII.

== Early life ==
=== Birth and ancestry ===
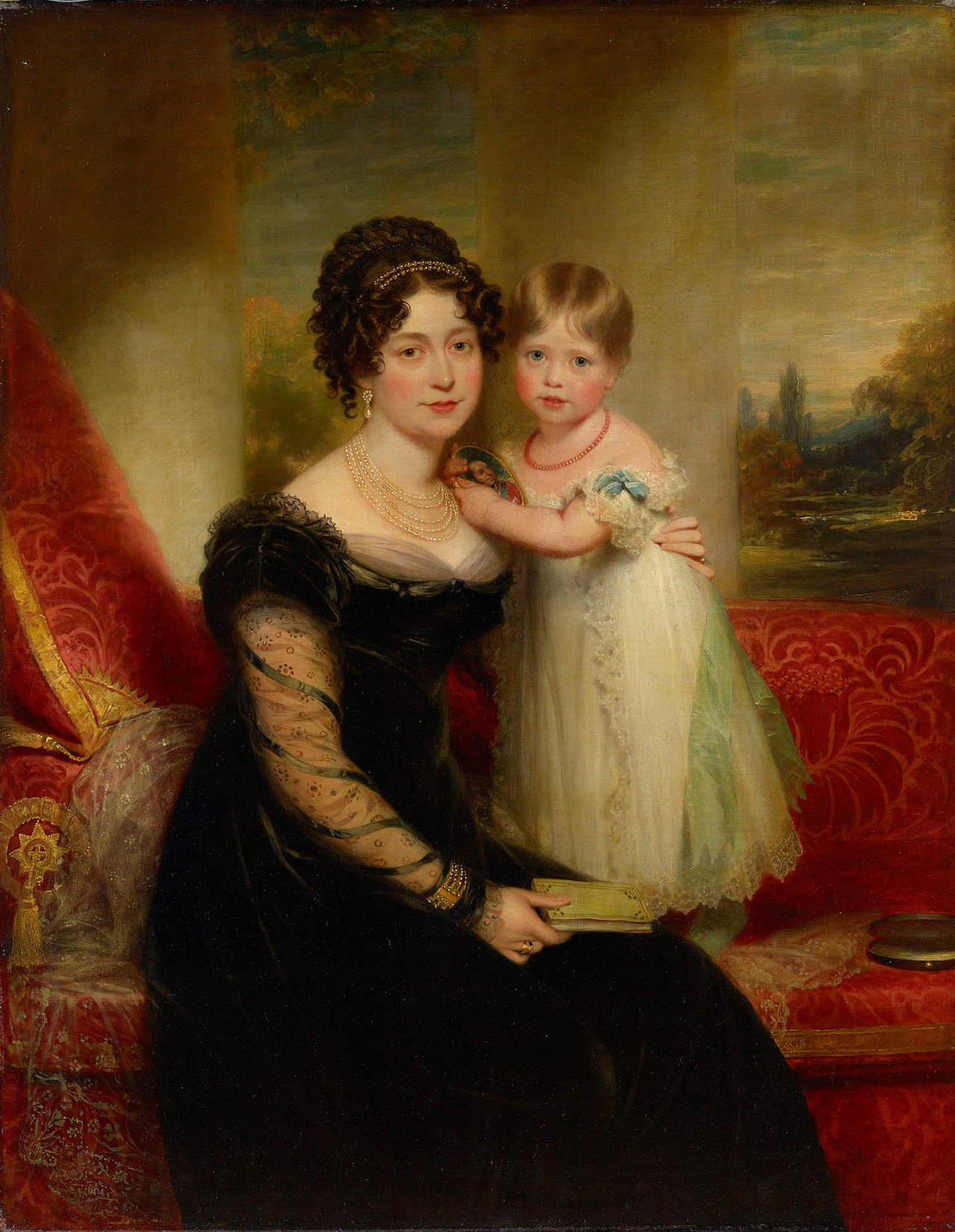
Victoria as a child with her mother, by William Beechey

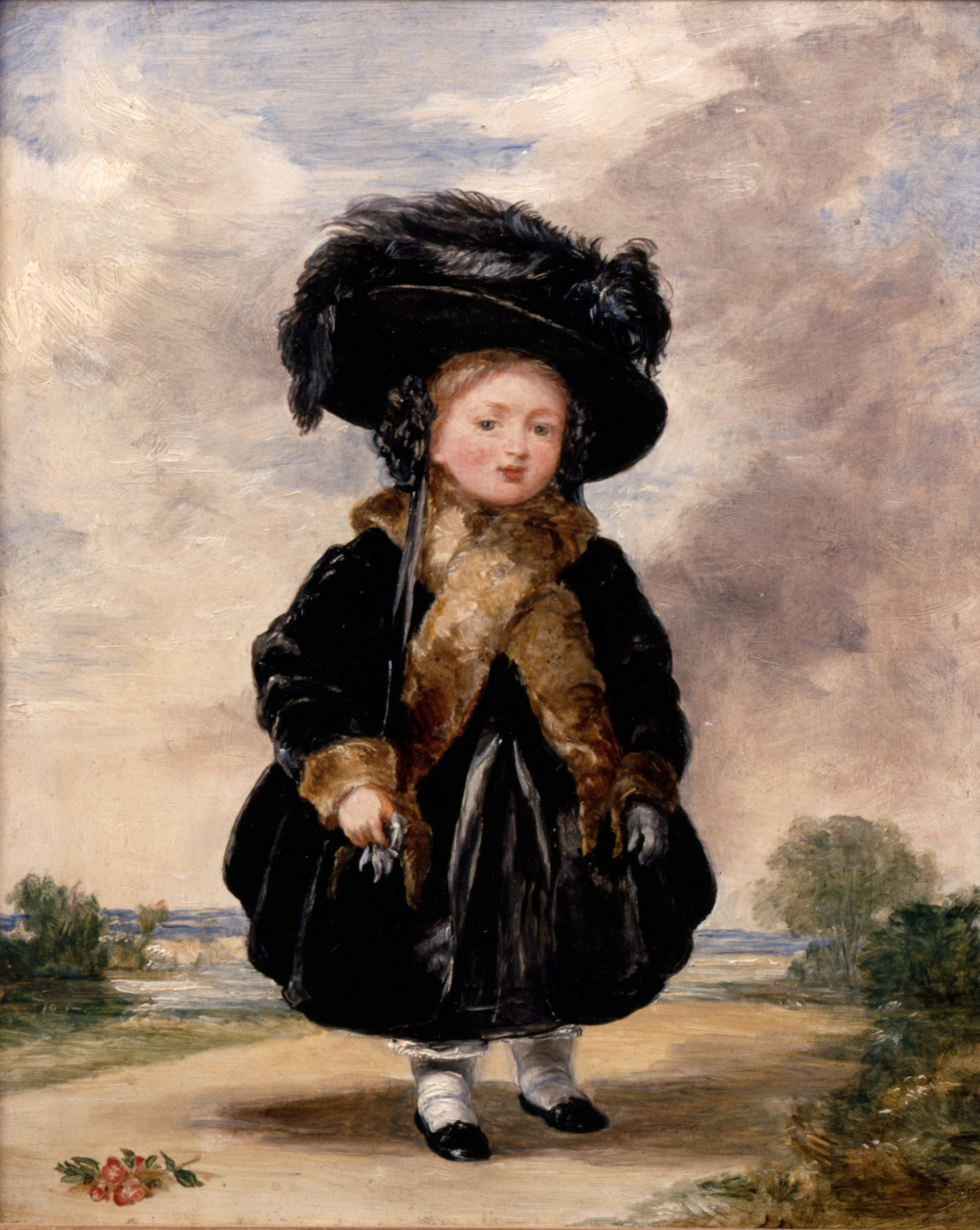
Portrait by Stephen Poyntz Denning, 1823

Victoria's father was Prince Edward, Duke of Kent and Strathearn, the fourth son of King George III. Until 1817, King George's only legitimate grandchild was Edward's niece Princess Charlotte of Wales, the daughter of George, Prince Regent (who would become George IV). Charlotte's death in 1817 precipitated a succession crisis that brought pressure on Edward and his unmarried brothers to marry and have children. In 1818, the Duke of Kent married Princess Victoria of Saxe-Coburg-Saalfeld, a widowed German princess with two children – Carl and Feodora – by her first marriage to Emich Carl, 2nd Prince of Leiningen. Her brother Leopold was Charlotte's widower and later the first king of Belgium. Victoria was born at 4:15 am on 24 May 1819 at Kensington Palace in London and was the Duke and Duchess of Kent's only child.

Victoria was christened privately by the Archbishop of Canterbury, Charles Manners-Sutton, on 24 June in the Cupola Room at Kensington Palace. (Note: Her godparents were Tsar Alexander I of Russia (represented by her uncle Frederick, Duke of York), her uncle George, Prince Regent, her aunt Queen Charlotte of Württemberg (represented by Victoria's aunt Princess Augusta) and Victoria's maternal grandmother the Dowager Duchess of Saxe-Coburg-Saalfeld (represented by Victoria's aunt Princess Mary, Duchess of Gloucester and Edinburgh).) She was baptised Alexandrina after one of her godparents, Tsar Alexander I of Russia, and Victoria, after her mother. Additional names proposed by her parents – Georgina (or Georgiana), Charlotte, and Augusta – were dropped on the instructions of the Prince Regent.

At birth, Victoria was fifth in the line of succession after the four eldest sons of George III: George, Prince Regent (later George IV); Frederick, Duke of York; William, Duke of Clarence (later William IV); and Victoria's father, Edward, Duke of Kent. Prince George had no surviving children, and Frederick had no children; further, both were estranged from their wives, who were both past child-bearing age, so the two eldest brothers were unlikely to have any further legitimate children. William married in 1818, in a joint ceremony with his brother Edward, but both of William's legitimate daughters died as infants. His elder daughter, Princess Charlotte, was born and died on 27 March 1819, two months before Victoria was born. When Victoria was less than a year old, her father died in January 1820. A week later her grandfather died and was succeeded by his eldest son as George IV. Victoria was then third in line to the throne after Frederick and William. She was fourth in line while William's second daughter, Princess Elizabeth, lived, from 10 December 1820 to 4 March 1821.

=== Heir presumptive ===
Frederick died in 1827, followed by George IV in 1830; their next surviving brother succeeded to the throne as William IV, and Victoria became heir presumptive. The Regency Act 1830 made special provision for Victoria's mother to act as regent in case William died while Victoria was still a minor. King William distrusted the Duchess's capacity to be regent and in 1836 he declared, in her presence, that he wanted to live until Victoria's 18th birthday, so that a regency could be avoided.

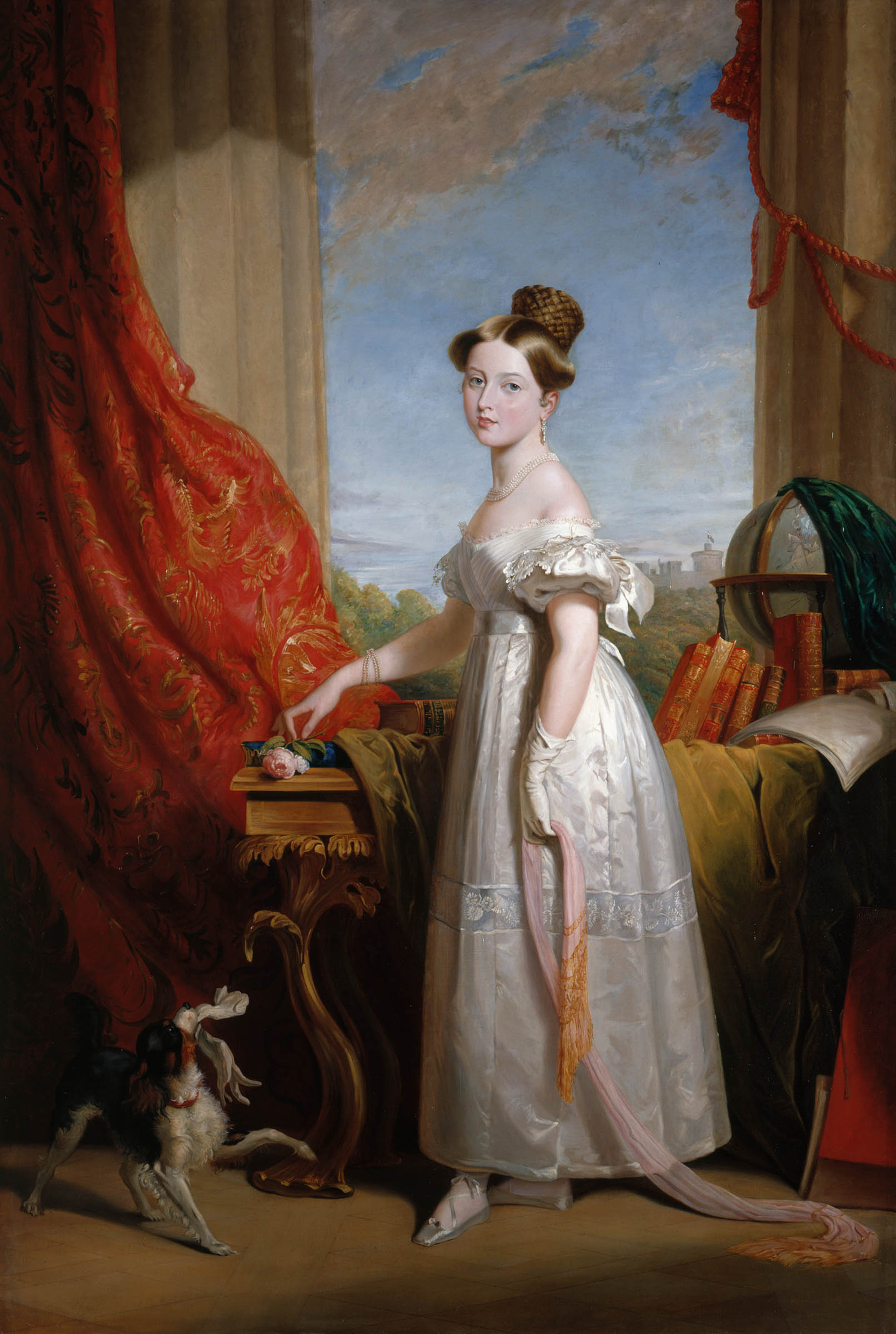
Portrait with her spaniel Dash by George Hayter, 1833

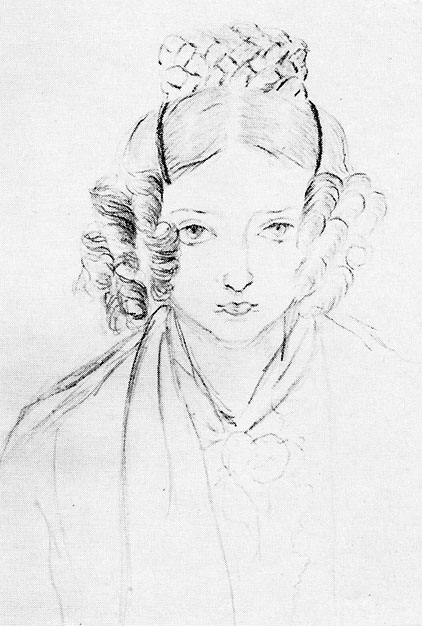
Self-portrait, 1835

Victoria later described her childhood as "rather melancholy". Her mother was extremely protective, and Victoria was raised largely isolated from other children under the so-called "Kensington System", an elaborate set of rules and protocols devised by the Duchess and her ambitious and domineering comptroller, Sir John Conroy, who was rumoured to be the Duchess's lover. The system prevented the princess from meeting people whom her mother and Conroy deemed undesirable (including most of her father's family), and was designed to render her weak and dependent upon them. The Duchess avoided the court because she was scandalised by the presence of King William's illegitimate children. Victoria shared a bedroom with her mother every night, studied with private tutors to a regular timetable, and spent her play-hours with her dolls and her King Charles Spaniel, Dash. Her lessons included French, German, Italian, and Latin, but she spoke only English at home. At age ten, she wrote and illustrated a children's story, The Adventures of Alice Laselles, which was eventually published in 2015.

In 1830, the Duchess and Conroy took Victoria across the centre of England to visit the Malvern Hills, stopping at towns and great country houses along the way. Similar journeys to other parts of England and Wales were taken in 1832, 1833, 1834 and 1835. To the King's annoyance, Victoria was enthusiastically welcomed in each of the stops. William compared the journeys to royal progresses and was concerned that they portrayed Victoria as his rival rather than his heir presumptive. Victoria disliked the trips; the constant round of public appearances made her tired and ill, and there was little time for her to rest. She objected on the grounds of the King's disapproval, but her mother dismissed his complaints as motivated by jealousy and forced Victoria to continue the tours. At Ramsgate in October 1835, Victoria contracted a severe fever, which Conroy initially dismissed as a childish pretence. While Victoria was ill, Conroy and the Duchess unsuccessfully badgered her to make Conroy her private secretary. As a teenager, Victoria resisted persistent attempts by her mother and Conroy to appoint him to her staff. Once queen, she banned him from her presence, but he remained in her mother's household.

By 1836, Victoria's maternal uncle Leopold, who had been King of the Belgians since 1831, hoped to marry her to Prince Albert, the son of his brother Ernest I, Duke of Saxe-Coburg and Gotha. Leopold arranged for Victoria's mother to invite her Coburg relatives to visit her in May 1836, with the purpose of introducing Victoria to Albert. William IV, however, disapproved of any match with the Coburgs, and instead favoured the suit of Prince Alexander of the Netherlands, second son of the Prince of Orange. Victoria was aware of the various matrimonial plans and critically appraised a parade of eligible princes. According to her diary, she enjoyed Albert's company from the beginning. After the visit she wrote, "[Albert] is extremely handsome; his hair is about the same colour as mine; his eyes are large and blue, and he has a beautiful nose and a very sweet mouth with fine teeth; but the charm of his countenance is his expression, which is most delightful." Alexander, on the other hand, she described as "very plain".

Victoria wrote to King Leopold, whom she considered her "best and kindest adviser", to thank him "for the prospect of great happiness you have contributed to give me, in the person of dear Albert ... He possesses every quality that could be desired to render me perfectly happy. He is so sensible, so kind, and so good, and so amiable too. He has besides the most pleasing and delightful exterior and appearance you can possibly see." However at 17, Victoria, though interested in Albert, was not yet ready to marry. The parties did not undertake a formal engagement, but assumed that the match would take place in due time.

== Accession and early reign ==
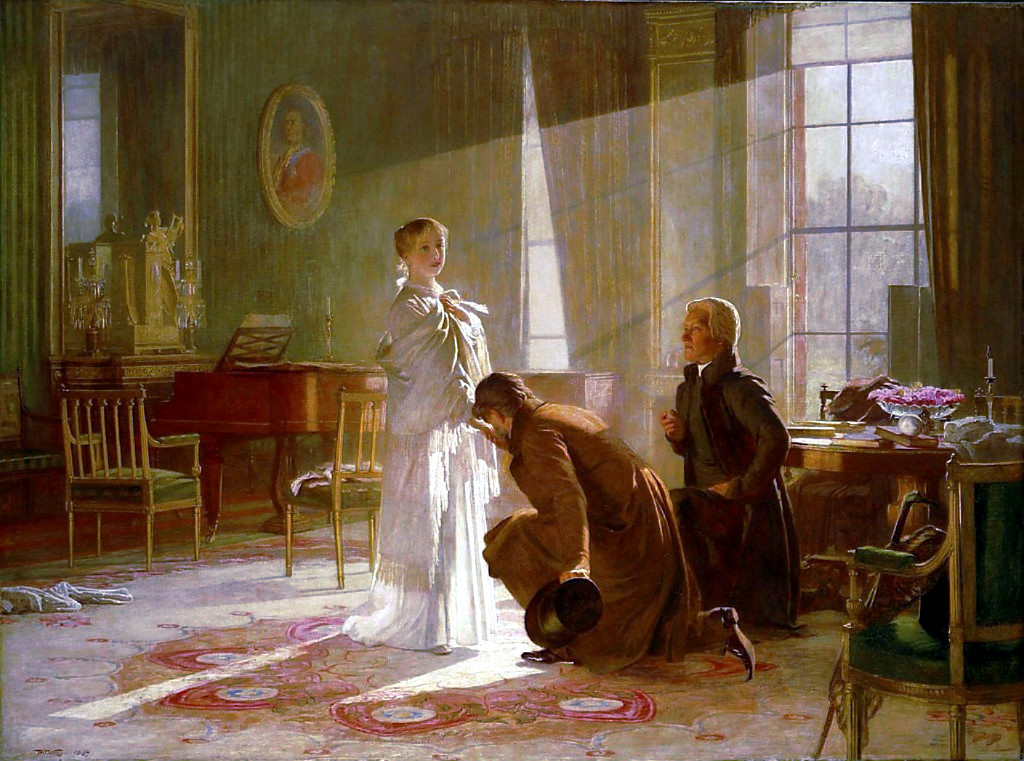
Victoria receives the news of her accession from Lord Conyngham (bowing) and the Archbishop Howley (right). Painting by Henry Tanworth Wells, 1887.

Victoria turned 18 on 24 May 1837, and thus a regency was avoided. Less than a month later, on 20 June 1837, William IV died at the age of 71, and Victoria became Queen of the United Kingdom. (Note: Under section 2 of the Regency Act 1830, the Accession Council's proclamation declared Victoria as the King's successor "saving the rights of any issue of His late Majesty King William the Fourth which may be borne of his late Majesty's Consort". "No. 19509", The London Gazette, 20 June 1837, p. 1581.) In her diary she wrote, "I was awoke at 6 o'clock by Mamma, who told me the Archbishop of Canterbury and Lord Conyngham were here and wished to see me. I got out of bed and went into my sitting-room (only in my dressing gown) and alone, and saw them. Lord Conyngham then acquainted me that my poor Uncle, the King, was no more, and had expired at 12 minutes past 2 this morning, and consequently that I am Queen." Official documents prepared on the first day of her reign described her as Alexandrina Victoria, but the first name was withdrawn at her own wish and not used again. Since 1714, Britain had shared a monarch with Hanover in Germany, but under Salic law, women were excluded from the Hanoverian succession. While Victoria inherited the British throne, her father's unpopular younger brother, Ernest Augustus, Duke of Cumberland, became King of Hanover. He was Victoria's heir presumptive until she had a child.

At the time of Victoria's accession, the government was led by the Whig prime minister Lord Melbourne. He at once became a powerful influence on the politically inexperienced monarch, who relied on him for advice. Charles Greville supposed that the widowed and childless Melbourne was "passionately fond of her as he might be of his daughter if he had one", and Victoria probably saw him as a father figure. Her coronation took place on 28 June 1838 at Westminster Abbey. Over 400,000 visitors came to London for the celebrations. She became the first sovereign to take up residence at Buckingham Palace and inherited the revenues of the duchies of Lancaster and Cornwall as well as being granted a civil list allowance of £385,000 per year. Financially prudent, she paid off her father's debts.

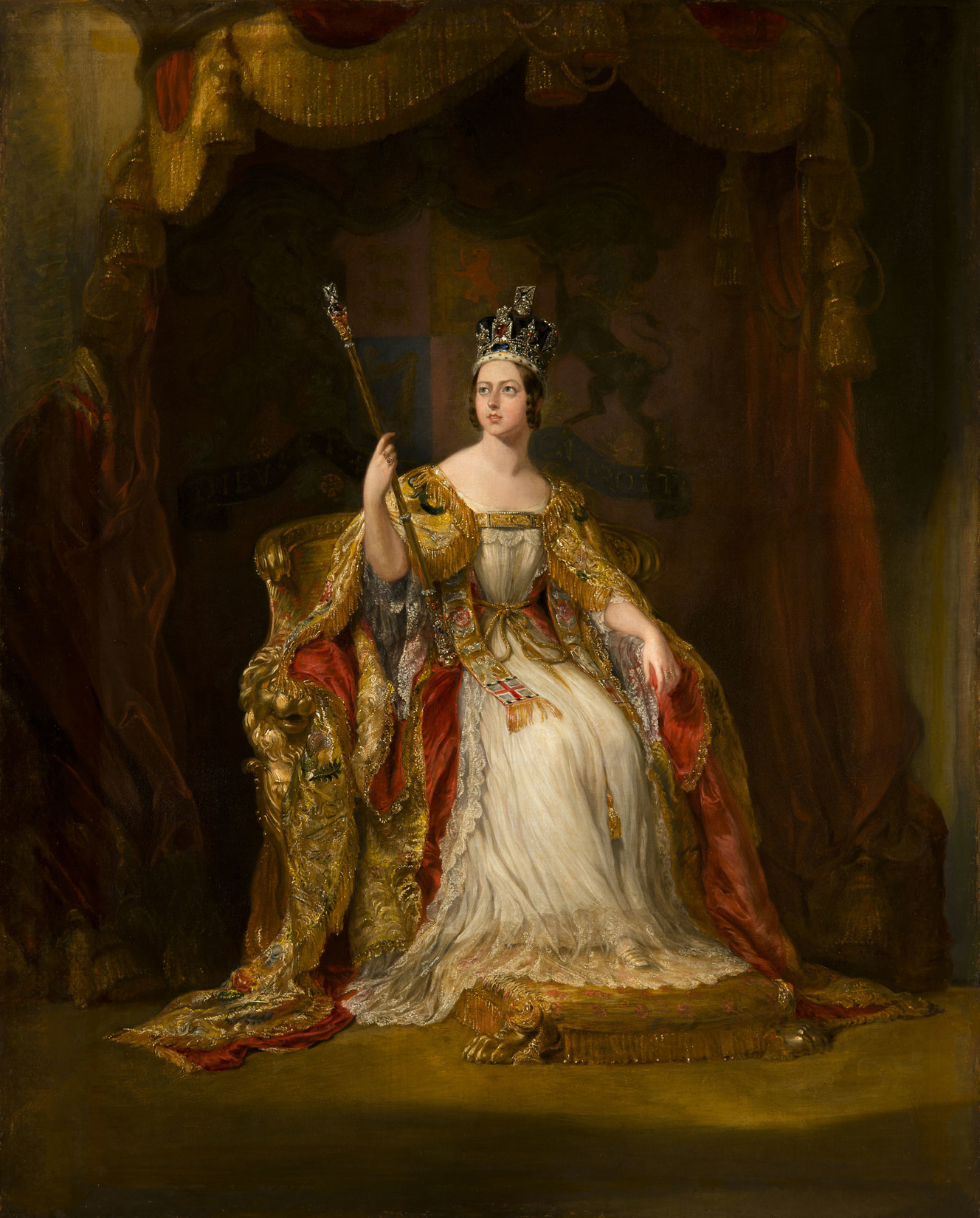
Coronation portrait by George Hayter

At the start of her reign Victoria was popular, but her reputation suffered in an 1839 court intrigue when one of her mother's ladies-in-waiting, Lady Flora Hastings, developed an abdominal growth that was widely rumoured to be an out-of-wedlock pregnancy by Sir John Conroy. Victoria believed the rumours. She hated Conroy, and despised "that odious Lady Flora", because she had conspired with Conroy and the Duchess in the Kensington System. At first, Lady Flora refused to submit to an intimate medical examination, until in mid-February she eventually acquiesced, and was found to be a virgin. Conroy, the Hastings family, and the opposition Tories organised a press campaign implicating the Queen in the spreading of false rumours about Lady Flora. When Lady Flora died in July, the post-mortem revealed a large tumour on her liver that had distended her abdomen. At public appearances, Victoria was hissed and jeered at as "Mrs. Melbourne".

In 1839, Melbourne resigned after Radicals and Tories (both of whom Victoria detested) voted against a bill to suspend the constitution of Jamaica. The bill removed political power from plantation owners who were resisting measures associated with the abolition of slavery. The Queen commissioned a Tory, Robert Peel, to form a new ministry. At the time, it was customary for the prime minister to appoint members of the Royal Household, who were usually his political allies and their spouses. Many of the Queen's ladies of the bedchamber were wives of Whigs, and Peel expected to replace them with wives of Tories. In what became known as the "bedchamber crisis", Victoria, advised by Melbourne, objected to their removal. Peel refused to govern under the restrictions imposed by the Queen, and consequently resigned his commission, allowing Melbourne to return to office.

== Marriage and public life ==
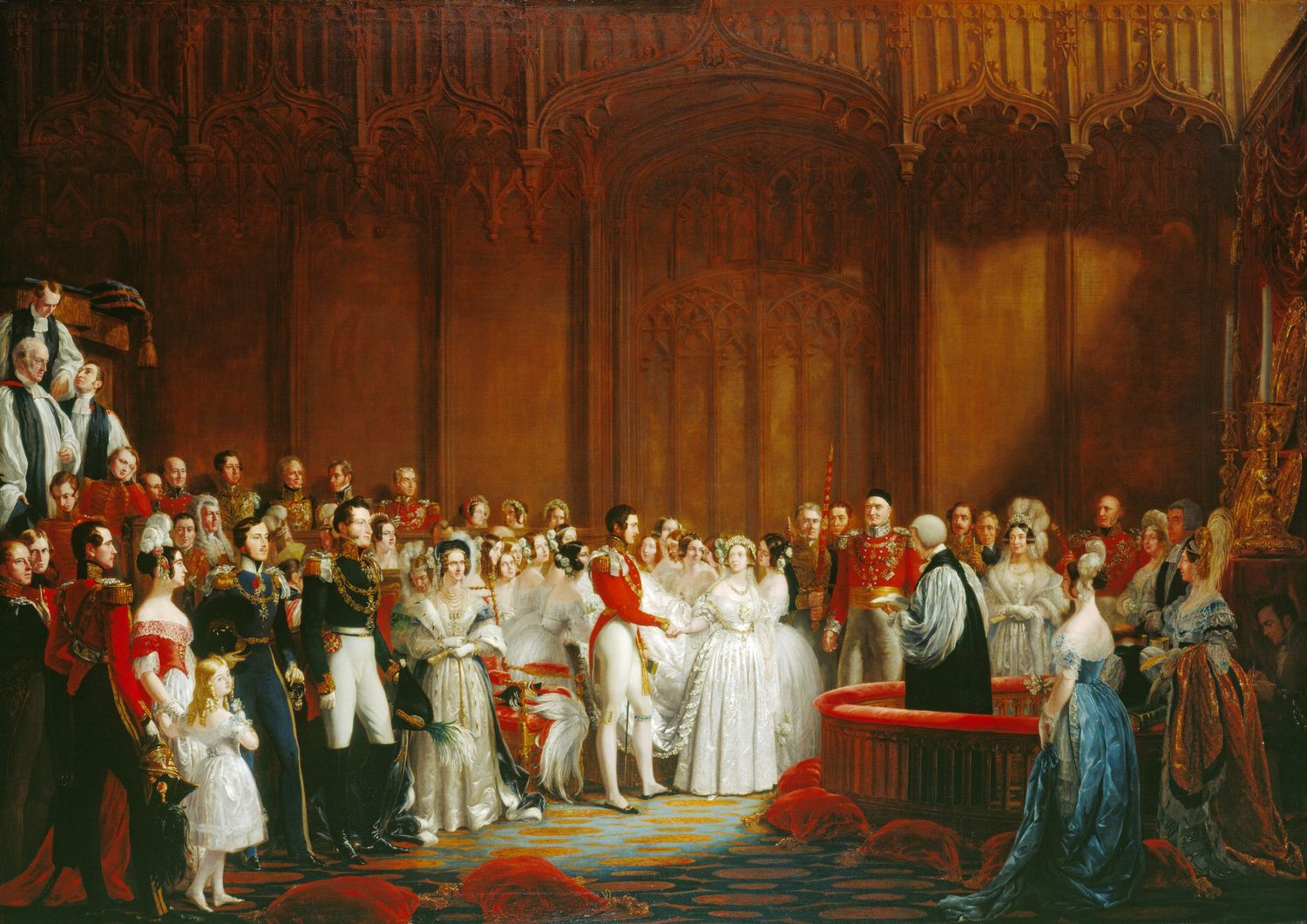
The Marriage of Queen Victoria, painted by George Hayter

Although Victoria was now queen, as an unmarried young woman she was required by social convention to live with her mother, despite their differences over the Kensington System and her mother's continued reliance on Conroy. The duchess was consigned to a remote apartment in Buckingham Palace, and Victoria often refused to see her. When Victoria complained to Melbourne that her mother's proximity promised "torment for many years", Melbourne sympathised but said it could be avoided by marriage, which Victoria called a "schocking [sic] alternative". Victoria showed interest in Albert's education for the future role he would have to play as her husband, but she resisted attempts to rush her into wedlock.

Victoria continued to praise Albert following his second visit in October 1839. They felt mutual affection and the Queen proposed to him on 15 October 1839, just five days after he had arrived at Windsor. They were married on 10 February 1840, in the Chapel Royal of St James's Palace, London. Victoria was love-struck. She spent the evening after their wedding lying down with a headache, but wrote ecstatically in her diary:

I NEVER, NEVER spent such an evening!!! MY DEAREST DEAREST DEAR Albert ... his excessive love & affection gave me feelings of heavenly love & happiness I never could have hoped to have felt before! He clasped me in his arms, & we kissed each other again & again! His beauty, his sweetness & gentleness—really how can I ever be thankful enough to have such a Husband! ... to be called by names of tenderness, I have never yet heard used to me before—was bliss beyond belief! Oh! This was the happiest day of my life!

Albert became an important political adviser as well as the Queen's companion, replacing Melbourne as the dominant influential figure in the first half of her life. Victoria's mother was evicted from the palace, to Ingestre House in Belgrave Square. After the death of Victoria's aunt Princess Augusta in 1840, the duchess was given both Clarence House and Frogmore House. Through Albert's mediation, relations between mother and daughter slowly improved.

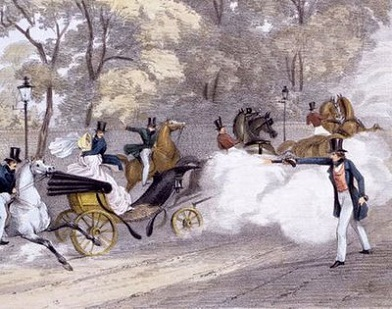
Contemporary lithograph of Edward Oxford's attempt to assassinate Victoria, 1840

During Victoria's first pregnancy in 1840, in the first few months of the marriage, 18-year-old Edward Oxford attempted to assassinate her while she was riding in a carriage with Prince Albert on her way to visit her mother. Oxford fired twice, but either both bullets missed or, as he later claimed, the guns had no shot. He was tried for high treason, found not guilty by reason of insanity, committed to an insane asylum indefinitely, and later sent to live in Australia. In the immediate aftermath of the attack, Victoria's popularity soared, mitigating residual discontent over the Hastings affair and the bedchamber crisis. Her daughter, also named Victoria, was born on 21 November 1840. The Queen hated being pregnant, viewed breast-feeding with disgust, and thought newborn babies were ugly. Nevertheless, over the following seventeen years, she and Albert had a further eight children: Albert Edward, Alice, Alfred, Helena, Louise, Arthur, Leopold and Beatrice.

The household was largely run by Victoria's childhood governess, Baroness Louise Lehzen from Hanover. Lehzen had been a formative influence on Victoria and had supported her against the Kensington System. Albert, however, thought that Lehzen was incompetent and that her mismanagement threatened his daughter Victoria's health. After a furious row between Victoria and Albert over the issue, Lehzen was pensioned off in 1842, and Victoria's close relationship with her ended.

On 29 May 1842, Victoria was riding in a carriage along The Mall, London, when John Francis aimed a pistol at her, but the gun did not fire. The assailant escaped; the following day, Victoria drove the same route, though faster and with a greater escort, in a deliberate attempt to bait Francis into taking a second aim and catch him in the act. As expected, Francis shot at her, but he was seized by plainclothes policemen, and convicted of high treason. On 3 July, two days after Francis's death sentence was commuted to transportation for life, John William Bean also tried to fire a pistol at the Queen, but it was loaded only with paper and tobacco and had too little charge. Edward Oxford felt that the attempts were encouraged by his acquittal in 1840. Bean was sentenced to 18 months in jail. In a similar attack in 1849, unemployed Irishman William Hamilton fired a powder-filled pistol at Victoria's carriage as it passed along Constitution Hill, London. In 1850, the Queen did sustain injury when she was assaulted by a possibly insane ex-army officer, Robert Pate. As Victoria was riding in a carriage, Pate struck her with his cane, crushing her bonnet and bruising her forehead. Both Hamilton and Pate were sentenced to seven years' transportation.

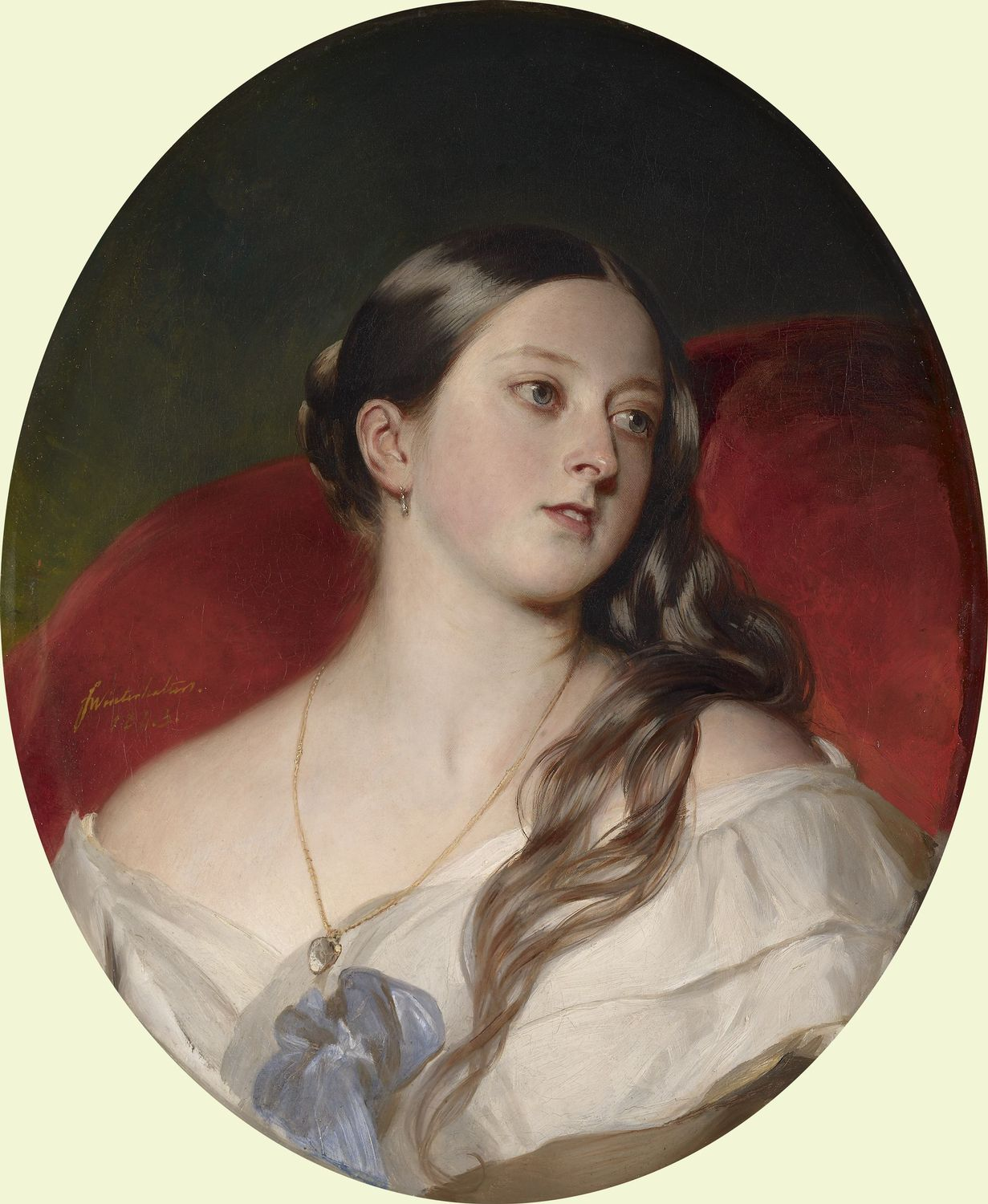
Portrait by Franz Xaver Winterhalter, 1843

Melbourne's support in the House of Commons weakened through the early years of Victoria's reign, and in the 1841 general election the Whigs were defeated. Peel became prime minister, and the ladies of the bedchamber most associated with the Whigs were replaced. In 1845, Ireland was hit by a potato blight. In the next four years, over a million Irish people died and another million emigrated in what became known as the Great Famine. In Ireland, Victoria was labelled "The Famine Queen". In January 1847 she personally donated £2,000 (equivalent to between £230,000 and £8.5 million in 2022) to the British Relief Association, more than any other individual famine relief donor, and supported the Maynooth Grant to a Roman Catholic seminary in Ireland, despite Protestant opposition. The story that she donated only £5 in aid to the Irish, and on the same day gave the same amount to Battersea Dogs Home, was a myth generated towards the end of the 19th century. By 1846, Peel's ministry faced a crisis involving the repeal of the Corn Laws. Many Tories – by then known also as Conservatives – were opposed to the repeal, but Peel, some Tories (the free-trade oriented liberal conservative "Peelites"), most Whigs and Victoria supported it. Peel resigned in 1846, after the repeal narrowly passed, and was replaced by Lord John Russell.

Victoria's British prime ministers
Year	Prime Minister (party)
1835	Viscount Melbourne (Whig)
1841	Sir Robert Peel (Conservative)
1846	Lord John Russell (Whig)
1852 (Feb.)	Earl of Derby (Conservative)
1852 (Dec.)	Earl of Aberdeen (Peelite)
1855	Viscount Palmerston (Liberal)
1858	Earl of Derby (Conservative)
1859	Viscount Palmerston (Liberal)
1865	Lord John Russell as Earl Russell (Liberal)
1866	Earl of Derby (Conservative)
1868 (Feb.)	Benjamin Disraeli (Cons.)
1868 (Dec.)	William Gladstone (Liberal)
1874	Benjamin Disraeli as Lord Beaconsfield (Cons.)
1880	William Gladstone (Liberal)
1885	Marquess of Salisbury (Cons.)
1886 (Feb.)	William Gladstone (Liberal)
1886 (July)	Marquess of Salisbury (Cons.)
1892	William Gladstone (Liberal)
1894	Earl of Rosebery (Liberal)
1895	Marquess of Salisbury (Cons.)
See List of prime ministers of Queen Victoria for details of her British and overseas premiers

Internationally, Victoria took a keen interest in the improvement of relations between France and Britain. She made and hosted several visits between the British royal family and the House of Orleans, who were related by marriage through the Coburgs. In 1843 and 1845, she and Albert stayed with King Louis Philippe I at Château d'Eu in Normandy; she was the first British or English monarch to visit a French monarch since the meeting of Henry VIII of England and Francis I of France on the Field of the Cloth of Gold in 1520. When Louis Philippe made a reciprocal trip in 1844, he became the first French king to visit a British sovereign. Louis Philippe was deposed in the revolutions of 1848, and fled to exile in England. At the height of a revolutionary scare in the United Kingdom in April 1848, Victoria and her family left London for the greater safety of Osborne House, a private estate on the Isle of Wight that they had purchased in 1845 and redeveloped. Demonstrations by Chartists and Irish nationalists failed to attract widespread support, and the scare died down without any major disturbances. Victoria's first visit to Ireland in 1849 was a public relations success, but it had no lasting impact or effect on the growth of Irish nationalism.

Russell's ministry, though Whig, was not favoured by the Queen. She found particularly offensive the Foreign Secretary, Lord Palmerston, who often acted without consulting the cabinet, the prime minister, or the Queen. Victoria complained to Russell that Palmerston sent official dispatches to foreign leaders without her knowledge, but Palmerston was retained in office and continued to act on his own initiative, despite her repeated remonstrances. It was only in 1851 that Palmerston was removed after he announced the British government's approval of President Louis-Napoleon Bonaparte's coup in France without consulting the prime minister. The following year, President Bonaparte was declared Emperor Napoleon III, by which time Russell's administration had been replaced by a short-lived minority government led by Lord Derby.

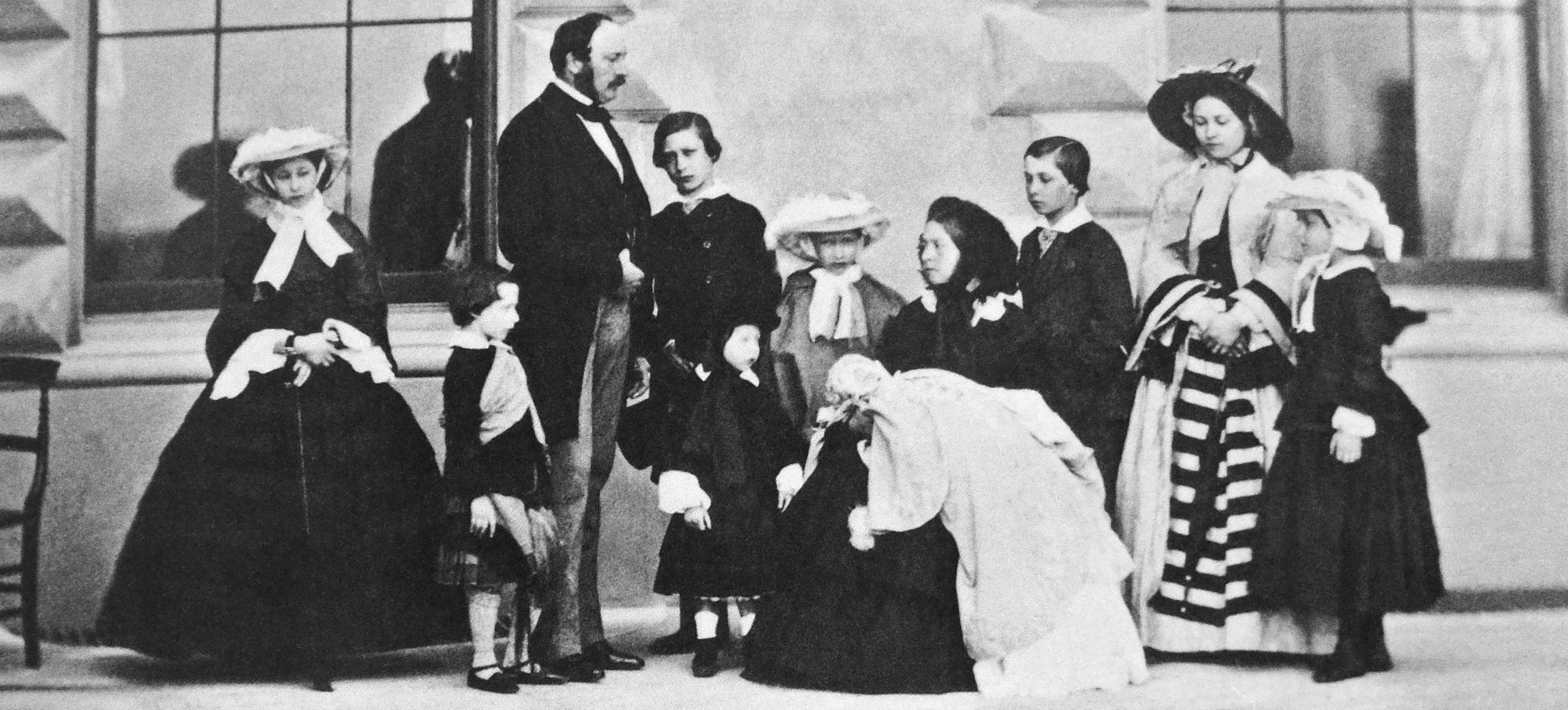
Albert, Victoria and their nine children, 1857. Left to right: Alice, Arthur, Prince Albert, Albert Edward, Leopold, Louise, Queen Victoria with Beatrice, Alfred, Victoria, and Helena

In 1853, Victoria gave birth to her eighth child, Leopold, with the aid of the new anaesthetic, chloroform. She was so impressed by the relief it gave from the pain of childbirth that she used it again in 1857 at the birth of her ninth and final child, Beatrice, despite opposition from members of the clergy, who considered it against biblical teaching, and members of the medical profession, who thought it dangerous. Victoria may have had postnatal depression after many of her pregnancies. Letters from Albert to Victoria intermittently complain of her loss of self-control. For example, about a month after Leopold's birth Albert complained in a letter to Victoria about her "continuance of hysterics" over a "miserable trifle".

In early 1855, the government of Lord Aberdeen, who had replaced Derby, fell amidst recriminations over the poor management of British troops in the Crimean War. Victoria approached both Derby and Russell to form a ministry, but neither had sufficient support, and Victoria was forced to appoint Palmerston as prime minister. Napoleon III, Britain's closest ally as a result of the Crimean War, visited London in April 1855, and from 17 to 28 August the same year Victoria and Albert returned the visit. Napoleon III met the couple at Boulogne and accompanied them to Paris. They visited the Exposition Universelle (a successor to Albert's 1851 brainchild the Great Exhibition) and Napoleon I's tomb at Les Invalides (to which his remains had only been returned in 1840), and were guests of honour at a 1,200-guest ball at the Palace of Versailles. This marked the first time that a reigning British monarch had been to Paris in over 400 years.

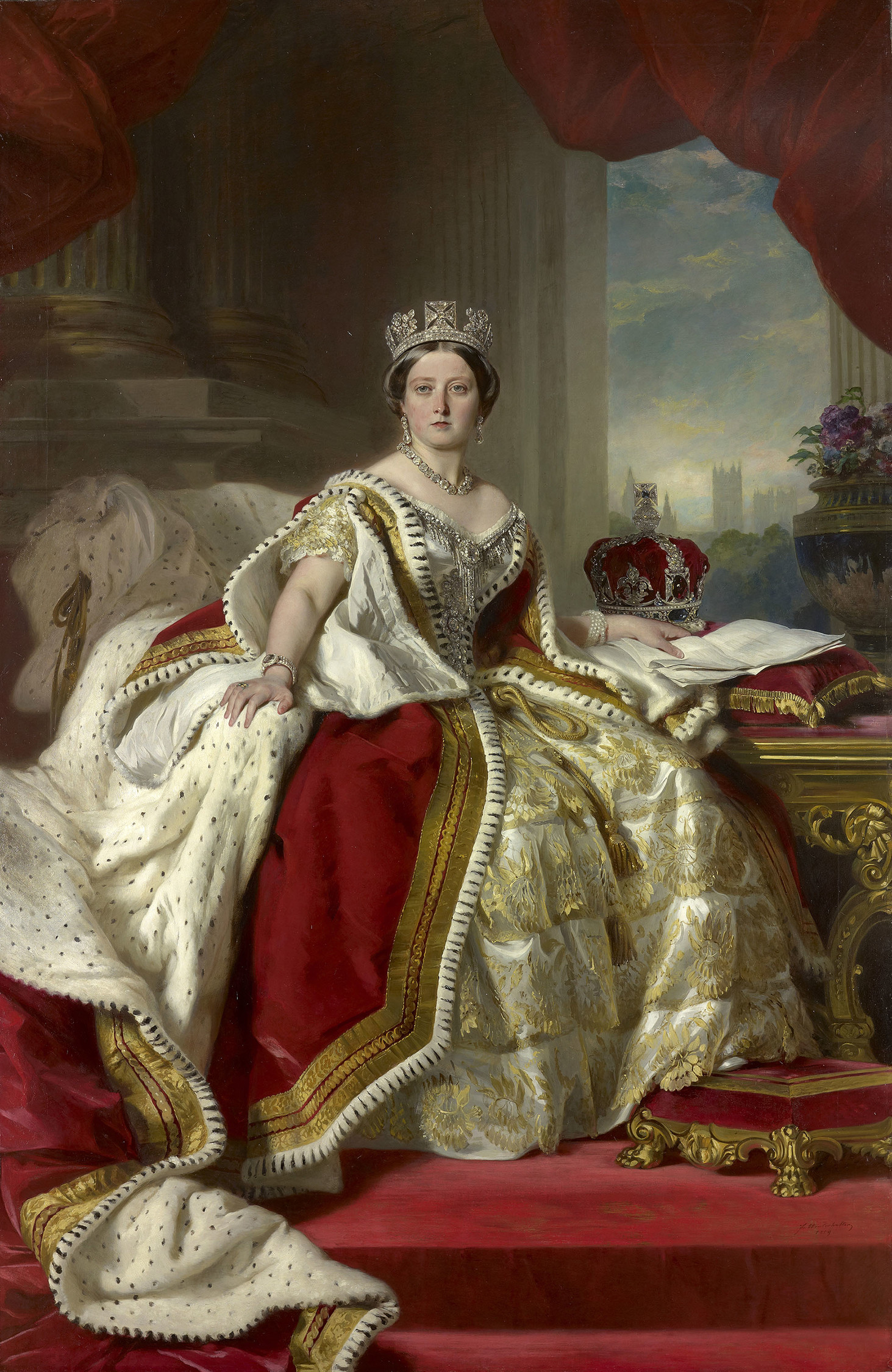
State portrait by Winterhalter, 1859

On 14 January 1858, an Italian refugee from Britain called Felice Orsini attempted to assassinate Napoleon III with a bomb made in England. The ensuing diplomatic crisis destabilised the government, and Palmerston resigned. Derby was reinstated as prime minister. Victoria and Albert attended the opening of a new basin at the French military port of Cherbourg on 5 August 1858, in an attempt by Napoleon III to reassure Britain that his military preparations were directed elsewhere. On her return Victoria wrote to Derby reprimanding him for the poor state of the Royal Navy in comparison to the French Navy. Derby's ministry did not last long, and in June 1859 Victoria recalled Palmerston to office.

Eleven days after Orsini's assassination attempt in France, Victoria's eldest daughter married Prince Frederick William of Prussia in London. They had been betrothed since September 1855, when Princess Victoria was 14 years old; the marriage was delayed by the Queen and her husband Albert until the bride was 17. The Queen and Albert hoped that their daughter and son-in-law would be a liberalising influence in the enlarging Prussian state. The Queen felt "sick at heart" to see her daughter leave England for Germany; "It really makes me shudder", she wrote to Princess Victoria in one of her frequent letters, "when I look round to all your sweet, happy, unconscious sisters, and think I must give them up too – one by one." Almost exactly a year later, the Princess gave birth to the Queen's first grandchild, Wilhelm, who would become the last German emperor.

== Widowhood and isolation ==
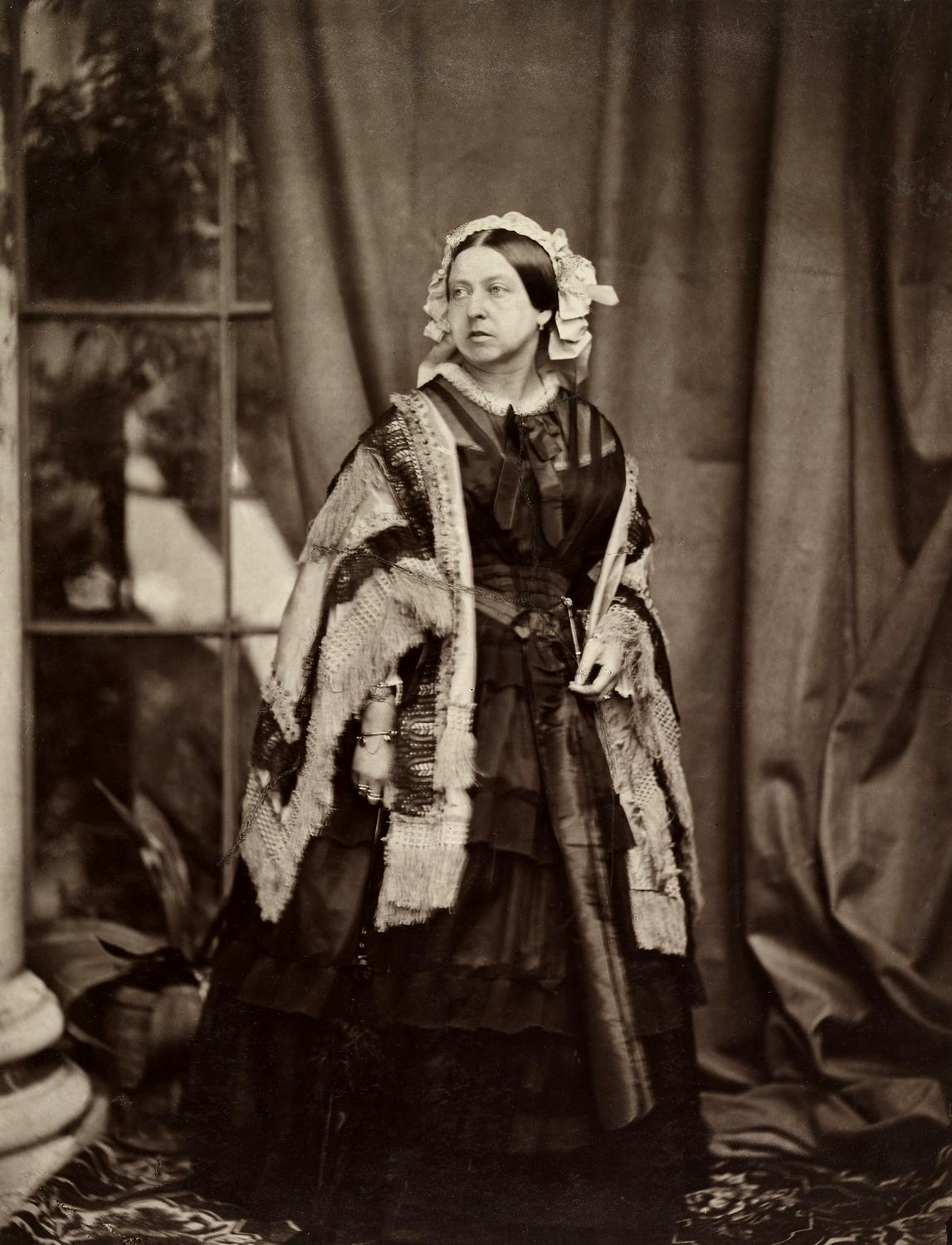
Photograph by J. J. E. Mayall, 1860

In March 1861, Victoria's mother died, with Victoria at her side. Through reading her mother's papers, Victoria discovered that her mother had loved her deeply; she was heart-broken, and blamed Conroy and Lehzen for "wickedly" estranging her from her mother. To relieve his wife during her intense and deep grief, Albert took on most of her duties, despite being ill himself with chronic stomach trouble. In August, Victoria and Albert visited their son, Albert Edward, Prince of Wales, who was attending army manoeuvres near Dublin, and spent a few days holidaying in Killarney. In November, Albert was made aware of gossip that his son had slept with the actress Nellie Clifden in Ireland. Appalled, he travelled to Cambridge, where his son was studying, to confront him.

By the beginning of December, Albert was very unwell. He was diagnosed with typhoid fever by William Jenner, and died on 14 December 1861. Victoria was devastated. She blamed her husband's death on worry over the Prince of Wales's philandering. He had been "killed by that dreadful business", she said. She entered a state of mourning and wore black for the remainder of her life. She avoided public appearances and rarely set foot in London in the following years. Her seclusion earned her the nickname "widow of Windsor". Her weight increased through comfort eating, which reinforced her aversion to public appearances.

Victoria's self-imposed isolation from the public diminished the popularity of the monarchy, and encouraged the growth of the republican movement. She did undertake her official government duties, yet chose to remain secluded in her royal residences—Windsor Castle, Osborne House, and the private estate in Scotland that she and Albert had acquired in 1847, Balmoral Castle. In March 1864, a protester stuck a notice on the railings of Buckingham Palace that announced "these commanding premises to be let or sold in consequence of the late occupant's declining business". Her uncle Leopold wrote to her advising her to appear in public. She agreed to visit the gardens of the Royal Horticultural Society at Kensington and take a drive through London in an open carriage.

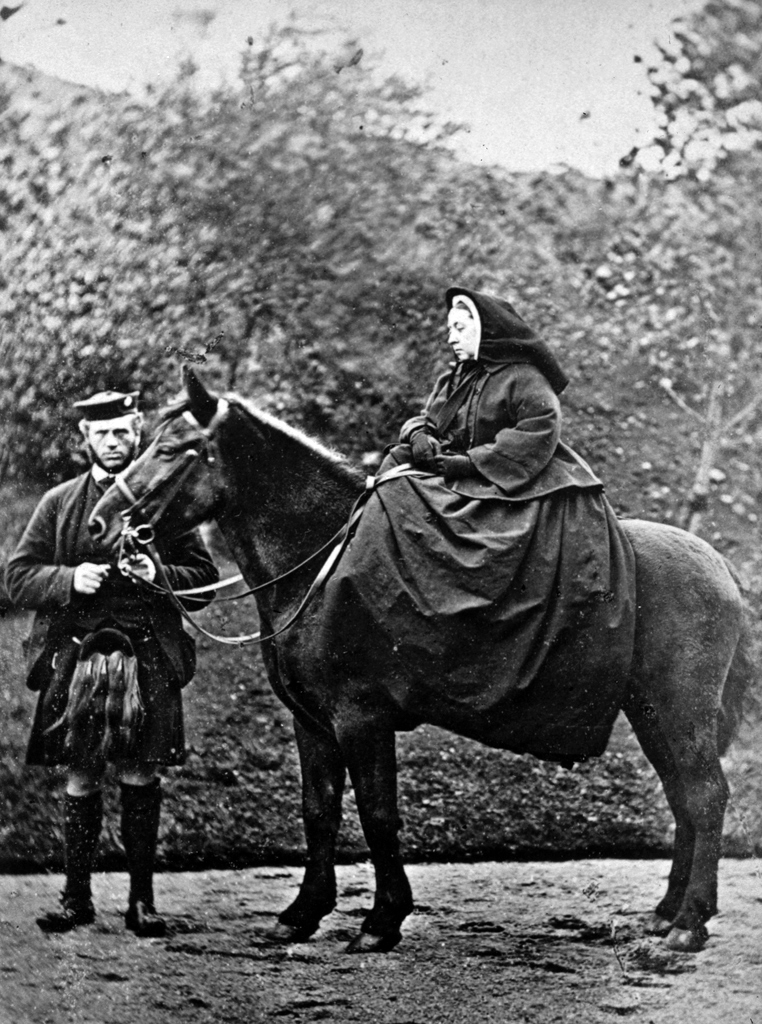
With John Brown at Balmoral, 1863. Photograph by G. W. Wilson

Through the 1860s, Victoria relied increasingly on a manservant from Scotland, John Brown. Rumours of a romantic connection and even a secret marriage appeared in print, and some referred to the Queen as "Mrs. Brown". The story of their relationship was the subject of the 1997 movie Mrs. Brown. A painting by Sir Edwin Henry Landseer depicting the Queen with Brown was exhibited at the Royal Academy, and Victoria published a book, Leaves from the Journal of Our Life in the Highlands, which featured Brown prominently and in which the Queen praised him highly.

Palmerston died in 1865, and after a brief ministry led by Russell, Derby returned to power. In 1866, Victoria attended the State Opening of Parliament for the first time since Albert's death. The following year she supported the passing of the Reform Act 1867 which doubled the electorate by extending the franchise to many urban working men, though she was not in favour of votes for women. Derby resigned in 1868, to be replaced by Benjamin Disraeli, who charmed Victoria. "Everyone likes flattery," he said, "and when you come to royalty you should lay it on with a trowel." With the phrase "we authors, Ma'am", he complimented her. Disraeli's ministry only lasted a matter of months, and at the end of the year his Liberal rival, William Ewart Gladstone, was appointed prime minister. Victoria found Gladstone's demeanour far less appealing; he spoke to her, she is thought to have complained, as though she were "a public meeting rather than a woman".

In 1870 republican sentiment in Britain, fed by the Queen's seclusion, was boosted after the establishment of the Third French Republic. A republican rally in Trafalgar Square demanded Victoria's removal, and Radical MPs spoke against her. In August and September 1871, she was seriously ill with an abscess in her arm, which Joseph Lister successfully lanced and treated with his new antiseptic carbolic acid spray. In late November 1871, at the height of the republican movement, the Prince of Wales contracted typhoid fever, the disease that was believed to have killed his father, and Victoria was fearful her son would die. As the tenth anniversary of her husband's death approached, her son's condition grew no better, and Victoria's distress continued. To general rejoicing, he recovered. Mother and son attended a public parade through London and a grand service of thanksgiving in St Paul's Cathedral on 27 February 1872, and republican feeling subsided.

On the last day of February 1872, two days after the thanksgiving service, 17-year-old Arthur O'Connor, a great-nephew of Irish MP Feargus O'Connor, waved an unloaded pistol at Victoria's open carriage just after she had arrived at Buckingham Palace. Brown, who was attending the Queen, grabbed him; O'Connor was later sentenced to 12 months' imprisonment and a birching. As a result of the incident, Victoria's popularity recovered further.

== Empress of India ==
After the Indian Rebellion of 1857, the British East India Company, which had ruled much of India, was dissolved, and Britain's possessions and protectorates on the Indian subcontinent were formally incorporated into the British Empire. The Queen had a relatively balanced view of the conflict, and condemned atrocities on both sides. She wrote of "her feelings of horror and regret at the result of this bloody civil war", and insisted, urged on by Albert, that an official proclamation announcing the transfer of power from the company to the state "should breathe feelings of generosity, benevolence and religious toleration". At her behest, a reference threatening the "undermining of native religions and customs" was replaced by a passage guaranteeing religious freedom.

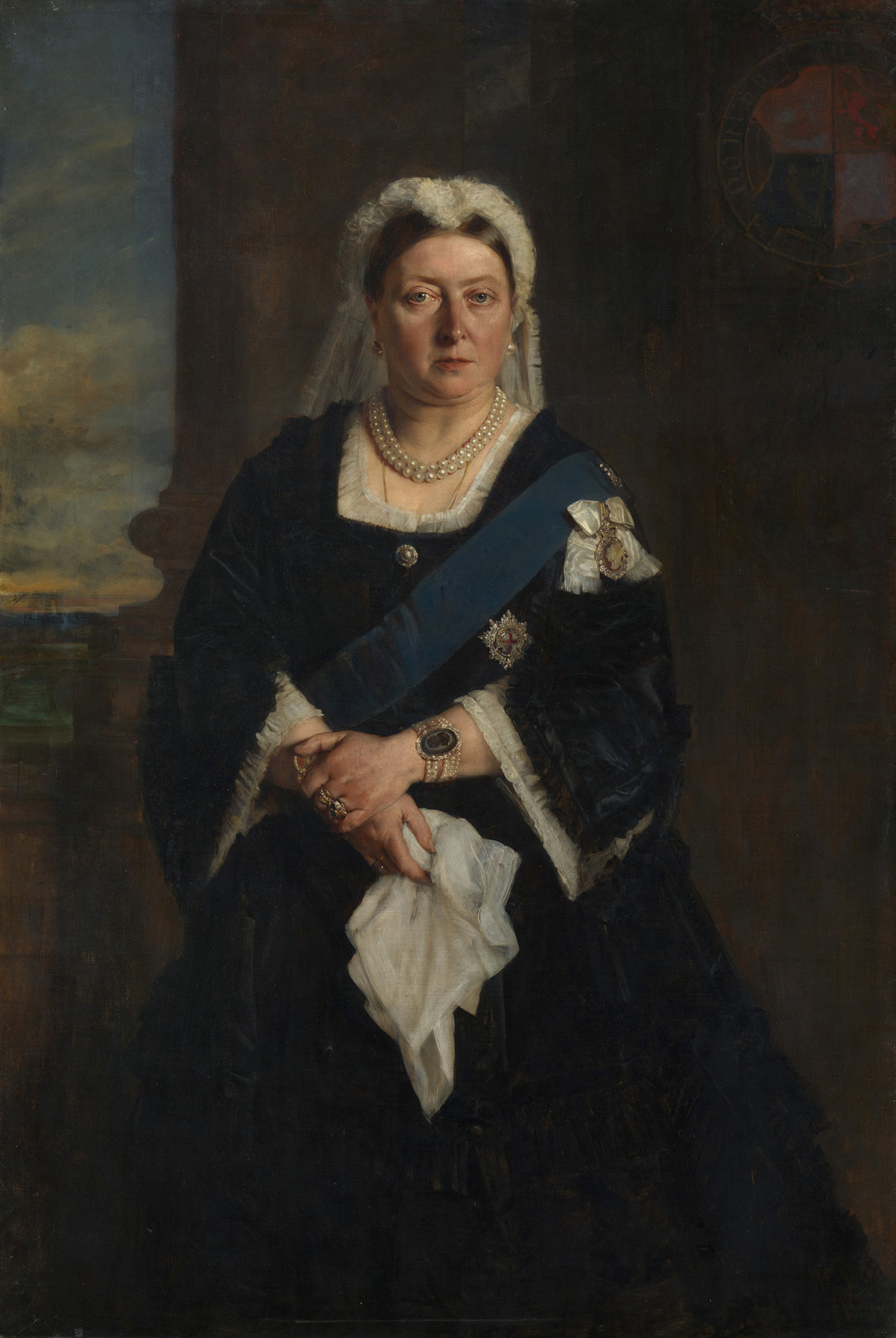
Victoria admired Heinrich von Angeli's 1875 portrait of her for its "honesty, total want of flattery, and appreciation of character".

In the 1874 general election, Disraeli was returned to power. He passed the Public Worship Regulation Act 1874, which removed Catholic rituals from the Anglican liturgy and which Victoria strongly supported. She preferred short, simple services, and personally considered herself more aligned with the presbyterian Church of Scotland than the episcopal Church of England. Disraeli also pushed the Royal Titles Act 1876 through Parliament, so that Victoria took the title "Empress of India" from 1 May 1876. The new title was proclaimed at the Delhi Durbar of 1 January 1877.

On 14 December 1878, the anniversary of Albert's death, Victoria's second daughter Alice, who had married Louis of Hesse, died of diphtheria in Darmstadt. Victoria noted the coincidence of the dates as "almost incredible and most mysterious". In May 1879, she became a great-grandmother (on the birth of Princess Feodora of Saxe-Meiningen) and passed her "poor old 60th birthday". She felt "aged" by "the loss of my beloved child".

Between April 1877 and February 1878, she threatened five times to abdicate while pressuring Disraeli to act against Russia during the Russo-Turkish War, but her threats had no impact on the events or their conclusion with the Congress of Berlin. Disraeli's expansionist foreign policy, which Victoria endorsed, led to conflicts such as the Anglo-Zulu War and the Second Anglo-Afghan War. "If we are to maintain our position as a first-rate Power", she wrote, "we must ... be Prepared for attacks and wars, somewhere or other, CONTINUALLY." Victoria saw the expansion of the British Empire as civilising and benign, protecting native peoples from more aggressive powers or cruel rulers: "It is not in our custom to annexe countries", she said, "unless we are obliged & forced to do so." To Victoria's dismay, Disraeli lost the 1880 general election, and Gladstone returned as prime minister. When Disraeli died the following year, she was blinded by "fast falling tears", and erected a memorial tablet "placed by his grateful Sovereign and Friend, Victoria R.I."

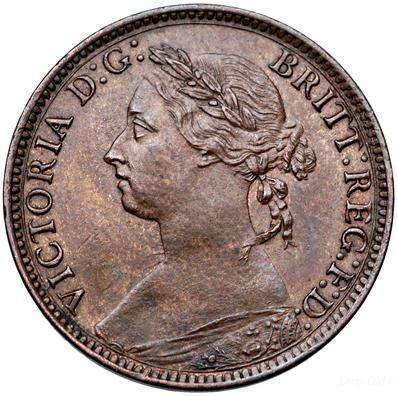
Victorian farthing, 1884

On 2 March 1882, Roderick Maclean, a disgruntled poet apparently offended by Victoria's refusal to accept one of his poems, shot at the Queen as her carriage left Windsor railway station. Gordon Chesney Wilson and another schoolboy from Eton College struck him with their umbrellas, until he was hustled away by a policeman. Victoria was outraged when he was found not guilty by reason of insanity, but was so pleased by the many expressions of loyalty after the attack that she said it was "worth being shot at – to see how much one is loved".

On 17 March 1883, Victoria fell down some stairs at Windsor, which left her lame until July; she never fully recovered and was plagued with rheumatism thereafter. John Brown died 10 days after her accident, and to the consternation of her private secretary, Sir Henry Ponsonby, Victoria began work on a eulogistic biography of Brown. Ponsonby and Randall Davidson, Dean of Windsor, who had both seen early drafts, advised Victoria against publication, on the grounds that it would stoke the rumours of a love affair. The manuscript was destroyed. In early 1884, Victoria did publish More Leaves from a Journal of a Life in the Highlands, a sequel to her earlier book, which she dedicated to her "devoted personal attendant and faithful friend John Brown". On the day after the first anniversary of Brown's death, Victoria was informed by telegram that her youngest son, Leopold, had died in Cannes. He was "the dearest of my dear sons", she lamented. The following month, Victoria's youngest child, Beatrice, met and fell in love with Prince Henry of Battenberg at the wedding of Victoria's granddaughter Princess Victoria of Hesse and by Rhine to Henry's brother Prince Louis of Battenberg. Beatrice and Henry planned to marry, but Victoria opposed the match at first, wishing to keep Beatrice at home to act as her companion. After a year, she was won around to the marriage by their promise to remain living with and attending her.

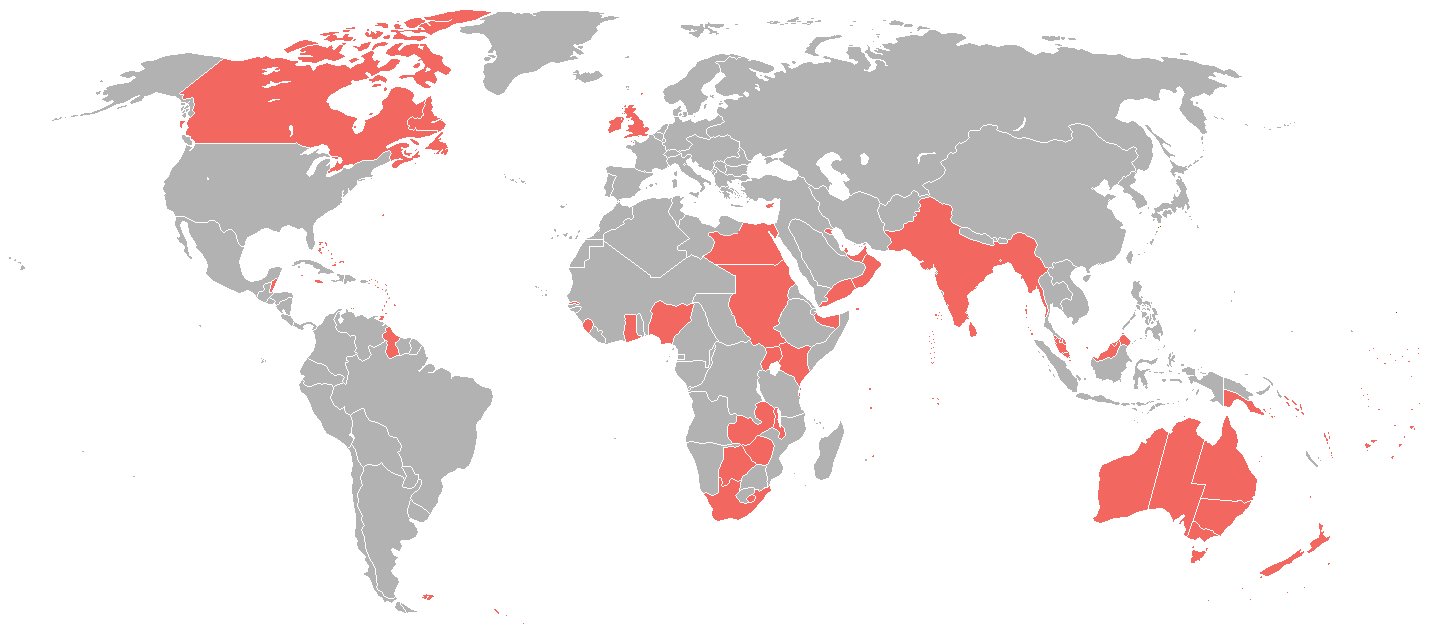
Extent of the British Empire in 1898

Victoria was pleased when Gladstone resigned in 1885 after his budget was defeated. She thought his government was "the worst I have ever had", and blamed him for the death of General Gordon during the Siege of Khartoum. Gladstone was replaced by Lord Salisbury. Salisbury's government only lasted a few months, however, and Victoria was forced to recall Gladstone, whom she referred to as a "half crazy & really in many ways ridiculous old man". Gladstone attempted to pass a bill granting Ireland home rule, but to Victoria's glee it was defeated. In the ensuing election, Gladstone's party lost to Salisbury's and the government switched hands again.

== Golden and Diamond Jubilees ==
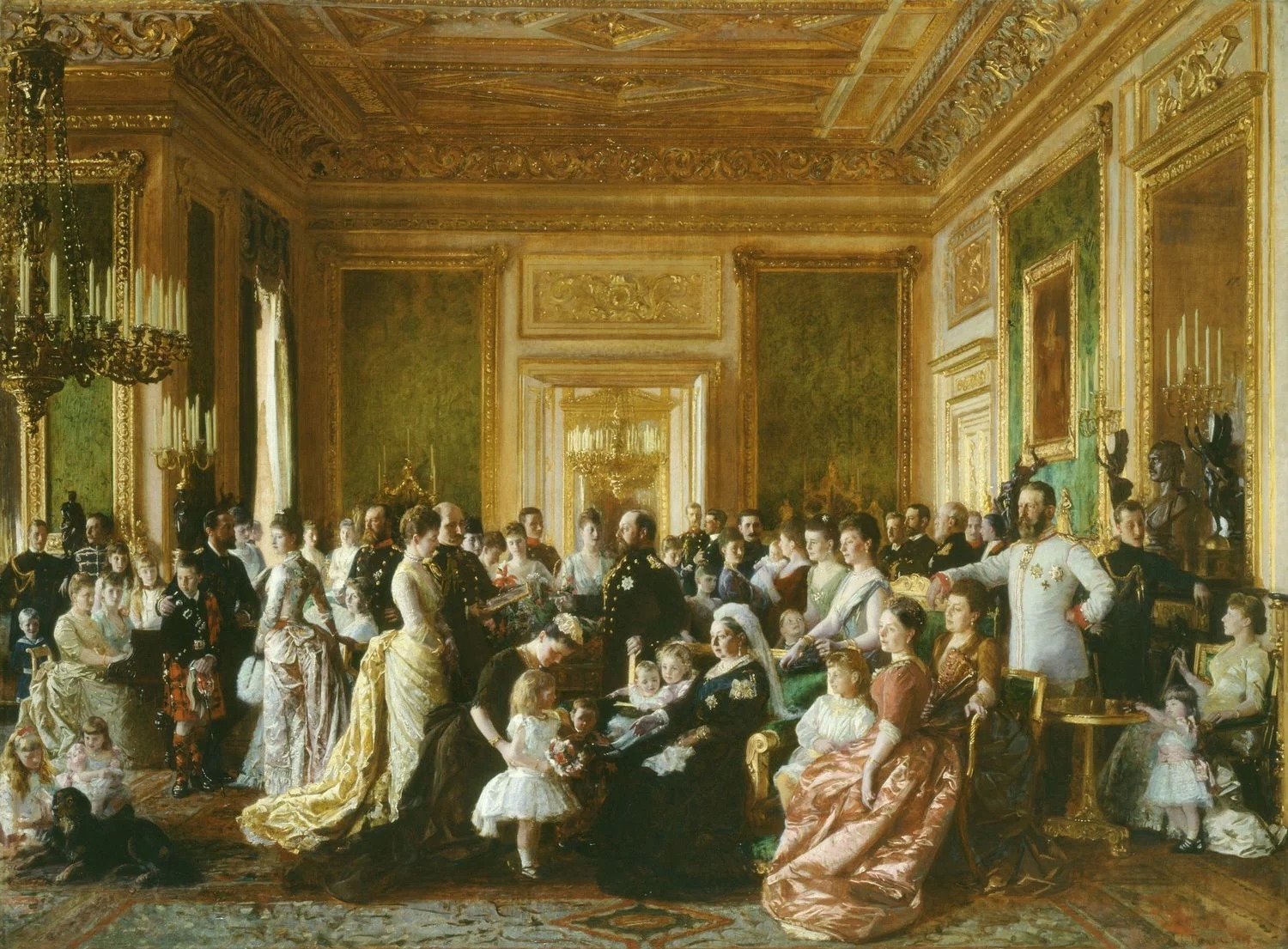
The Family of Queen Victoria in 1887, by Laurits Tuxen. The painting, commissioned by the Queen to celebrate her Golden Jubilee, depicts Victoria and members of her family in the Green Drawing Room at Windsor Castle.

In 1887, the British Empire celebrated Victoria's Golden Jubilee. She marked the fiftieth anniversary of her accession on 20 June with a banquet to which 50 kings and princes were invited. The following day, she participated in a procession and attended a thanksgiving service in Westminster Abbey. By this time, Victoria was once again extremely popular. Two days later on 23 June, she engaged two Indian Muslims as waiters, one of whom was Abdul Karim. He was soon promoted to "Munshi": teaching her Urdu and acting as a clerk. Her family and retainers were appalled, and accused Abdul Karim of spying for the Muslim Patriotic League and biasing the Queen against Hindus and in favour of Muslims. Equerry Frederick Ponsonby (the son of Sir Henry) discovered that the Munshi had lied about his parentage, and reported to Lord Elgin, Viceroy of India, "the Munshi occupies very much the same position as John Brown used to do." Victoria dismissed their complaints as racial prejudice. Abdul Karim remained in her service until he returned to India with a pension, on her death.

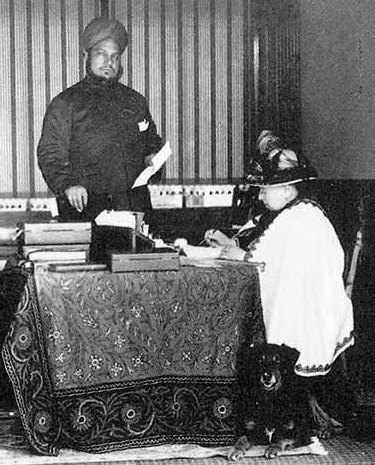
With the Munshi Abdul Karim

Victoria's eldest daughter became empress consort of Germany in 1888, but she was widowed a little over three months later, and Victoria's eldest grandchild became German Emperor as Wilhelm II. Victoria and Albert's hopes of a liberal Germany would go unfulfilled, as Wilhelm was a firm believer in autocracy. Victoria thought he had "little heart or Zartgefühl [tact] – and ... his conscience & intelligence have been completely wharped [sic]".

Gladstone returned to power after the 1892 general election; he was 82 years old. Victoria objected when Gladstone proposed appointing the Radical MP Henry Labouchère to the Cabinet, so Gladstone agreed not to appoint him. In 1894, Gladstone retired and, without consulting the outgoing prime minister, Victoria appointed Lord Rosebery as prime minister. His government was weak, and the following year Lord Salisbury replaced him. Salisbury remained prime minister for the remainder of Victoria's reign.

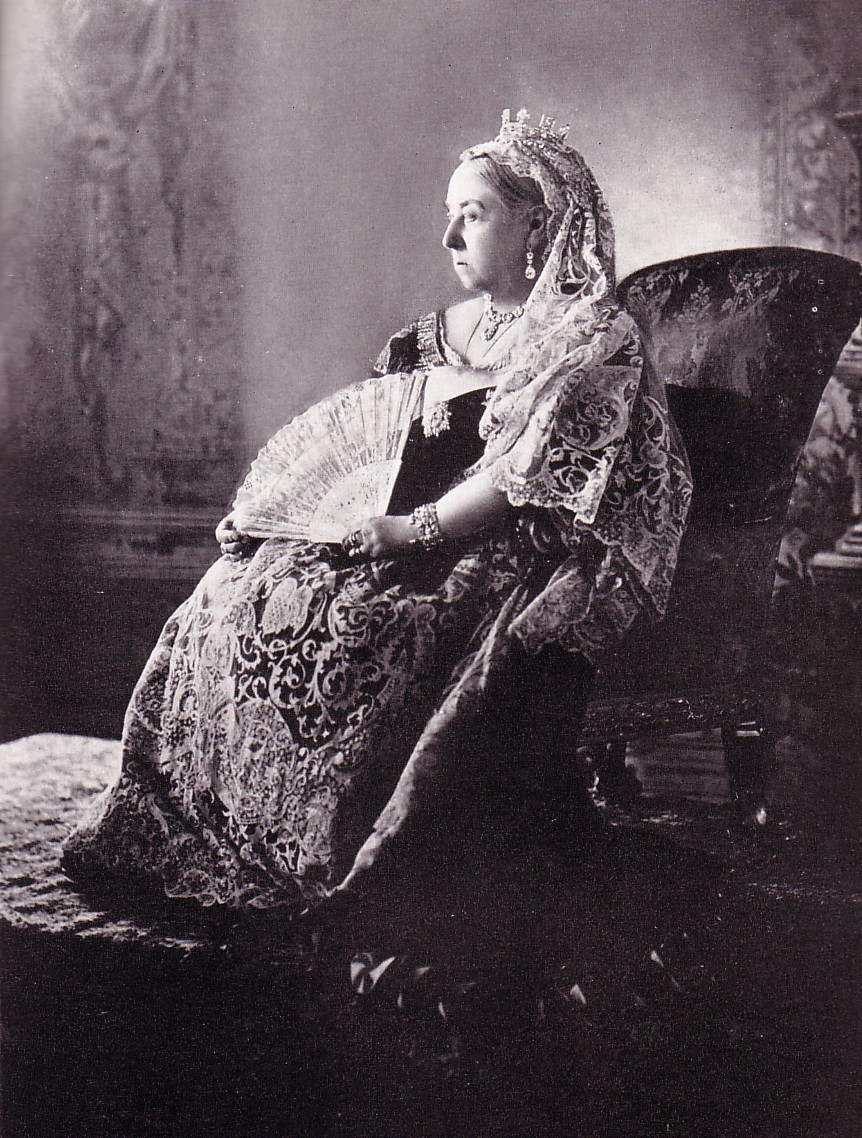
Official Diamond Jubilee photograph by W. & D. Downey

On 23 September 1896, Victoria surpassed her grandfather George III as the longest-reigning monarch in British history. The Queen requested that any special celebrations be delayed until 1897, to coincide with her Diamond Jubilee, which was made a festival of the British Empire at the suggestion of the Colonial Secretary, Joseph Chamberlain. The prime ministers of all the self-governing Dominions were invited to London for the festivities. One reason for including the prime ministers of the Dominions and excluding foreign heads of state was to avoid having to invite Victoria's grandson Wilhelm II, who, it was feared, might cause trouble at the event.

The Queen's Diamond Jubilee procession on 22 June 1897 followed a route six miles long through London and included troops from all over the empire. The procession paused for an open-air service of thanksgiving held outside St Paul's Cathedral, throughout which Victoria sat in her open carriage, to avoid her having to climb the steps to enter the building. The celebration was marked by vast crowds of spectators and great outpourings of affection for the 78-year-old Queen.

== Declining health and death ==
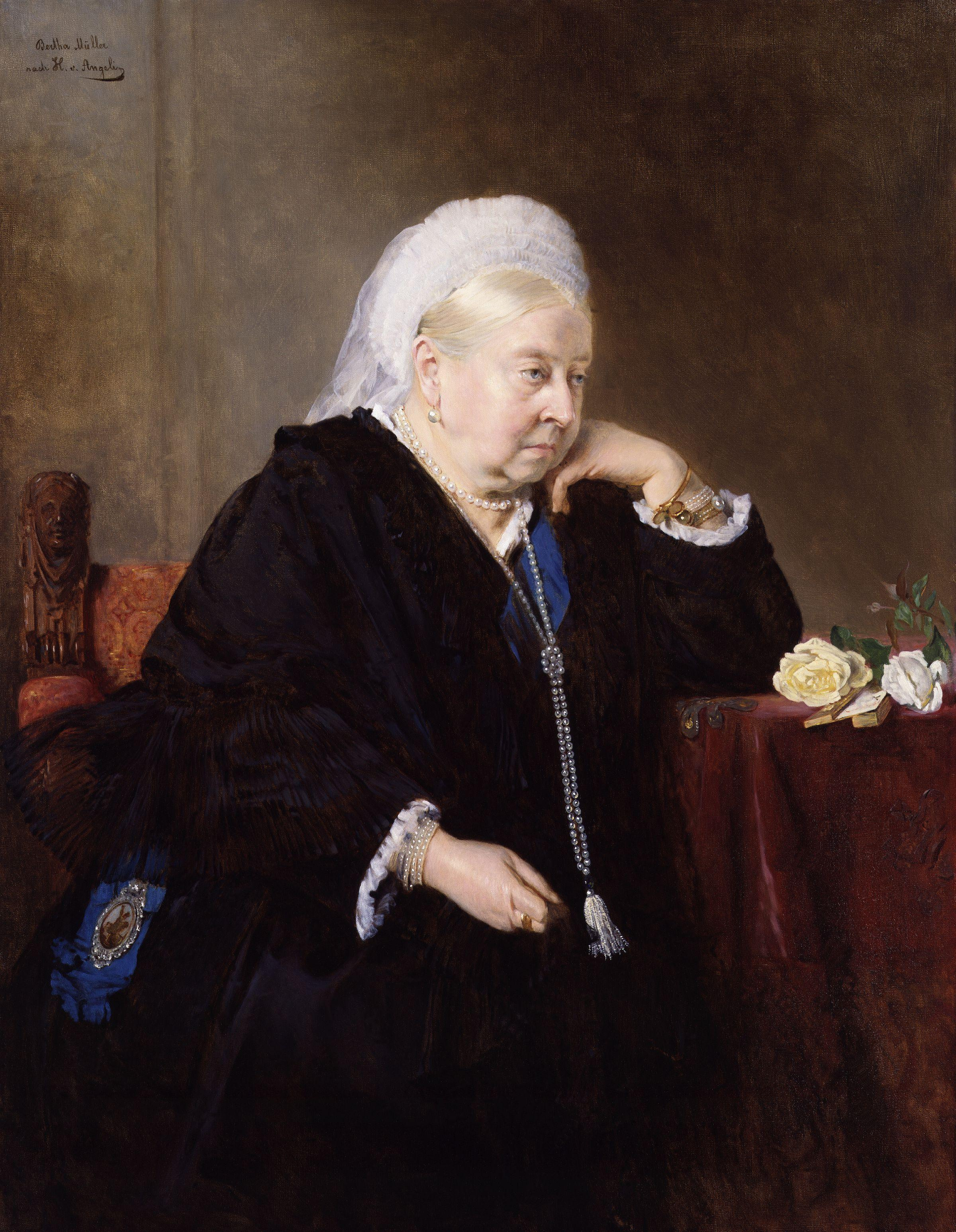
Portrait by Heinrich von Angeli, 1899

Queen Victoria in Dublin, 1900

Victoria regularly holidayed in mainland Europe. In 1889, during a stay in Biarritz, she became the first reigning monarch from Britain to visit Spain by briefly crossing the border. By April 1900, the Boer War was so unpopular in mainland Europe that her annual trip to France seemed inadvisable. Instead, the Queen went to Ireland for the first time since 1861, in part to acknowledge the contribution of Irish regiments to the South African war.

In July 1900, Victoria's second son, Alfred ("Affie"), died. "Oh, God! My poor darling Affie gone too", she wrote in her journal. "It is a horrible year, nothing but sadness & horrors of one kind & another."

Following a custom she maintained throughout her widowhood, Victoria spent the Christmas of 1900 at Osborne House on the Isle of Wight. Rheumatism in her legs had rendered her disabled, and her eyesight was clouded by cataracts. Through early January, she felt "weak and unwell", and by mid-January she was "drowsy [...] dazed, [and] confused". Her favourite pet Pomeranian, Turi, was laid on her bed as a last request. Victoria died at 6:30 pm on 22 January 1901, aged 81, in the presence of her eldest son, Albert Edward, and grandson, Wilhelm II. Albert Edward succeeded immediately as Edward VII.

In 1897, Victoria had written instructions for her funeral, which was to be military as befitting a soldier's daughter and the head of the army, and white instead of black. On 25 January, Edward VII and Wilhelm II, together with Prince Arthur, helped lift her body into the coffin. She was dressed in a white dress and her wedding veil. An array of mementos commemorating her extended family, friends and servants were laid in the coffin with her, at her request, by her physician and dressers. One of Albert's dressing gowns was placed by her side, with a plaster cast of his hand, while a lock of John Brown's hair, along with a picture of him, was placed in her left hand concealed from the view of the family by a carefully positioned bunch of flowers. Items of jewellery placed on Victoria included the wedding ring of Brown's mother, which Brown gave Victoria in 1883. Her funeral took place on Saturday, 2 February, in St George's Chapel, Windsor Castle. Following two days of lying-in-state, she was interred beside Prince Albert in the Royal Mausoleum, Frogmore, within Home Park, Windsor.

With a reign of 63 years, seven months, and two days, Victoria was the longest-reigning British monarch and the longest-reigning queen regnant in world history, until her great-great-granddaughter Elizabeth II surpassed her on 9 September 2015. She was the last monarch of Britain from the House of Hanover; her son Edward VII belonged to her husband's House of Saxe-Coburg and Gotha.

== Legacy ==
=== Reputation ===
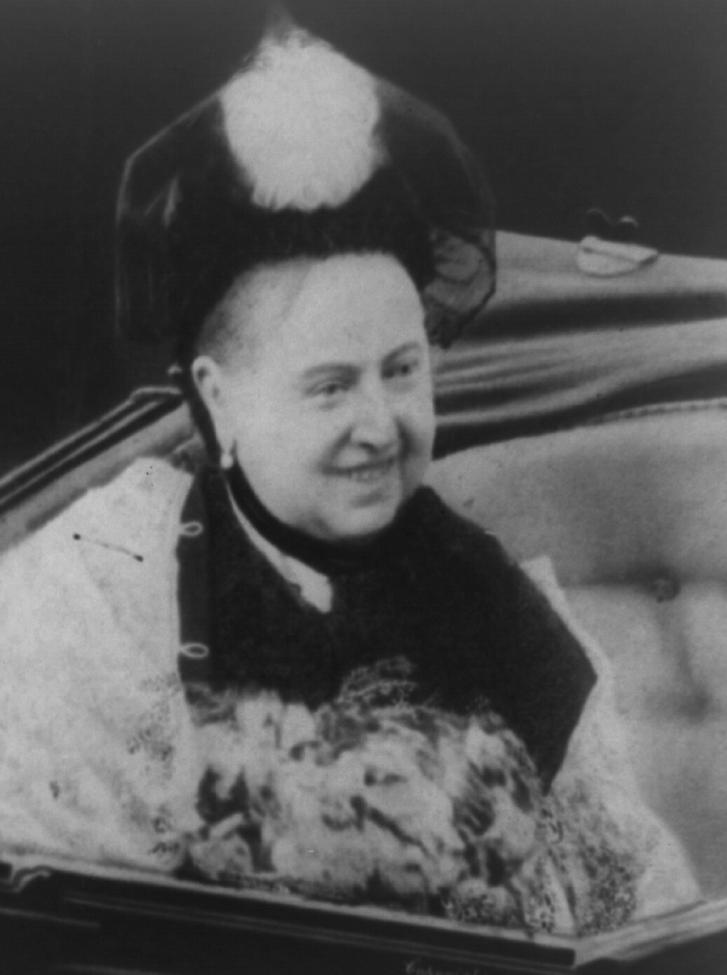
Victoria, amused. The remark "We are not amused" is attributed to her but there is no direct evidence that she ever said it, and she denied doing so. Her staff and family recorded that Victoria "was immensely amused and roared with laughter" on many occasions.

According to one of her biographers, Giles St Aubyn, Victoria wrote an average of 2,500 words a day during her adult life. From July 1832 until just before her death, she kept a detailed journal, which eventually encompassed 122 volumes. After Victoria's death, her youngest daughter, Princess Beatrice, was appointed her literary executor. Beatrice transcribed and edited the diaries covering Victoria's accession onwards, and burned the originals in the process. Despite this destruction, much of the diaries still exist. In addition to Beatrice's edited copy, Lord Esher transcribed the volumes from 1832 to 1861 before Beatrice destroyed them. Part of Victoria's extensive correspondence has been published in volumes edited by A. C. Benson, Hector Bolitho, George Earle Buckle, Lord Esher, Roger Fulford, and Richard Hough among others.

In her later years, Victoria was stout, dowdy, and about five feet (1.5 metres) tall, but she projected a grand image. She was unpopular during the first years of her widowhood, but was well liked during the 1880s and 1890s, when she embodied the empire as a benevolent matriarchal figure. Only after the release of her diary and letters did the extent of her political influence become known to the wider public. Biographies of Victoria written before much of the primary material became available, such as Lytton Strachey's Queen Victoria of 1921, are now considered out of date. The biographies written by Elizabeth Longford and Cecil Woodham-Smith, in 1964 and 1972 respectively, are still widely admired. Stanley Weintraub's from 1987 is considered one of the gold-standard biographies of Victoria, and was the first to be written by an American. They, and others, conclude that as a person Victoria was emotional, obstinate, honest, and straight-talking.

Through Victoria's reign, the gradual establishment of a modern constitutional monarchy in Britain continued. Reforms of the voting system increased the power of the House of Commons at the expense of the House of Lords and the monarch. In 1867, Walter Bagehot wrote that the monarch only retained "the right to be consulted, the right to encourage, and the right to warn". As Victoria's monarchy became more symbolic than political, it placed a strong emphasis on morality and family values, in contrast to the sexual, financial and personal scandals that had been associated with previous members of the House of Hanover and which had discredited the monarchy. The concept of the "family monarchy", with which the burgeoning middle classes could identify, was solidified.

=== Descendants and haemophilia ===
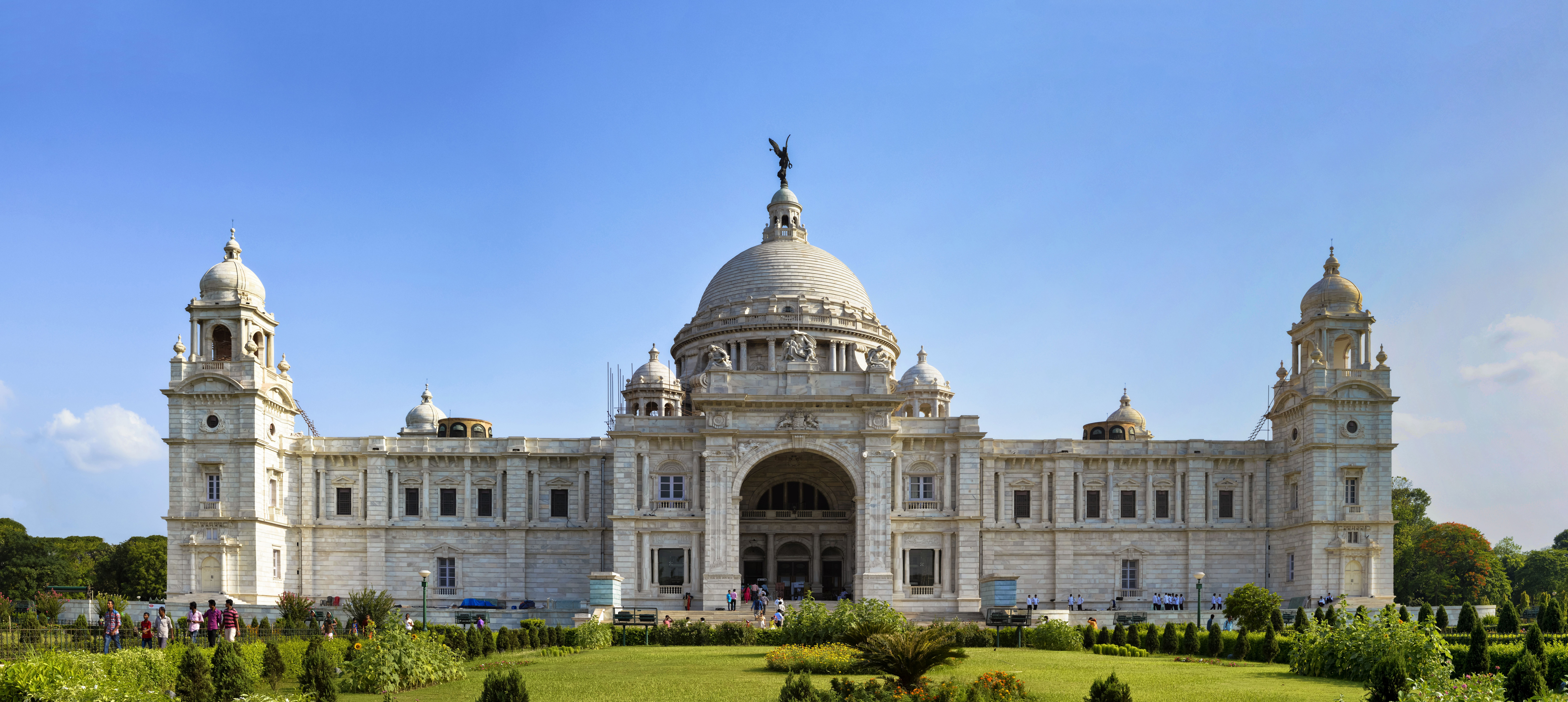
The Victoria Memorial in Kolkata, India

Victoria's links with Europe's royal families earned her the nickname "the grandmother of Europe". Of the grandchildren of Victoria and Albert, 34 survived to adulthood.

Victoria's youngest son, Leopold, was affected by the blood-clotting disease haemophilia B and at least two of her five daughters, Alice and Beatrice, were carriers. Royal haemophiliacs descended from Victoria included her great-grandsons, Alexei Nikolaevich, Tsarevich of Russia; Alfonso, Prince of Asturias; and Infante Gonzalo of Spain. The presence of the disease in Victoria's descendants, but not in her ancestors, led to modern speculation that her true father was not the Duke of Kent, but a haemophiliac. There is no documentary evidence of a haemophiliac in connection with Victoria's mother, and as male carriers always had the disease, even if such a man had existed he would have been seriously ill. It is more likely that the mutation arose spontaneously because Victoria's father was over 50 at the time of her conception and haemophilia arises more frequently in the children of older fathers. Spontaneous mutations account for about a third of cases.

== Titles, styles, honours, and arms ==
=== Titles and styles ===
She was born Princess Alexandrina Victoria of Kent, with a style of Her Royal Highness. At the end of her reign, her full style was: "Her Majesty Victoria, by the Grace of God, of the United Kingdom of Great Britain and Ireland Queen, Defender of the Faith, Empress of India".

=== Honours ===
==== British honours ====
- Royal Family Order of George IV, 1826
- Founder of the Victoria Cross, 5 February 1856
- Founder and Sovereign of the Order of the Star of India, 25 June 1861
- Founder and Sovereign of the Royal Order of Victoria and Albert, 10 February 1862
- Founder and Sovereign of the Order of the Crown of India, 1 January 1878
- Founder and Sovereign of the Order of the Indian Empire, 1 January 1878
- Founder and Sovereign of the Royal Red Cross, 27 April 1883
- Founder and Sovereign of the Distinguished Service Order, 6 November 1886
- Albert Medal of the Royal Society of Arts, 1887
- Founder and Sovereign of the Royal Victorian Order, 23 April 1896

==== Foreign honours ====
- Spain:
  - Dame of the Order of Queen Maria Luisa, 21 December 1833
  - Grand Cross of the Order of Charles III
- Portugal:
  - Dame of the Order of Queen Saint Isabel, 23 February 1836
  - Grand Cross of the Order of the Immaculate Conception of Vila Viçosa
- Russia: Grand Cross of St. Catherine, 26 June 1837
- France: Grand Cross of the Legion of Honour, 5 September 1843
- Mexico/Mexican Empire:
  - Grand Cross of the National Order of Guadalupe, 1854
  - Grand Cross of the Imperial Order of San Carlos, 1866
- Prussia: Dame of the Order of Louise, 1st Division, 11 June 1857
- Brazil: Grand Cross of the Order of Pedro I, 3 December 1872
- Persia:
  - Order of the Sun, 1st Class in Diamonds, 20 June 1873
  - Order of the August Portrait, 20 June 1873
- Siam:
  - Grand Cross of the White Elephant, 1880
  - Dame of the Order of the Royal House of Chakri, 1887
- Hawaii: Grand Cross of the Order of Kamehameha I, with Collar, July 1881
- Serbia:
  - Grand Cross of the Cross of Takovo, 1882
  - Grand Cross of the White Eagle, 1883
  - Grand Cross of St. Sava, 1897
- Hesse and by Rhine: Dame of the Golden Lion, 25 April 1885
- Bulgaria: Order of the Bulgarian Red Cross, August 1887
- Ethiopia: Grand Cross of the Seal of Solomon, 22 June 1897 – Diamond Jubilee gift
- Montenegro: Grand Cross of the Order of Prince Danilo I, 1897
- Saxe-Coburg and Gotha: Silver Wedding Medal of Duke Alfred and Duchess Marie, 23 January 1899

=== Arms ===
As Sovereign, Victoria used the royal coat of arms of the United Kingdom. As she could not succeed to the throne of Hanover, her arms did not carry the Hanoverian symbols that were used by her immediate predecessors. Her arms have been borne by all of her successors on the throne.

Coats of arms of Queen Victoria

Royal coat of arms outside Scotland

Royal coat of arms in Scotland

== Family ==
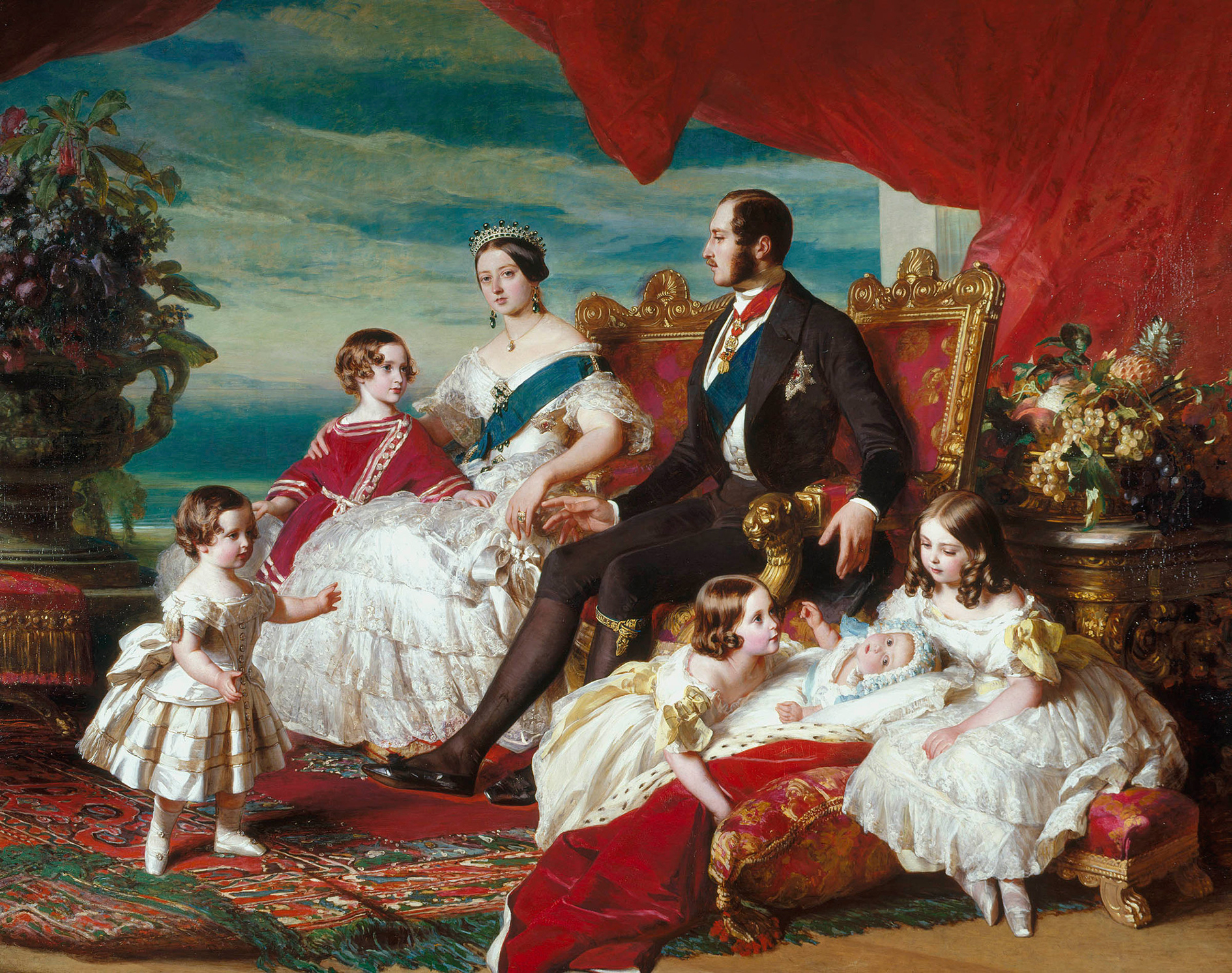
Victoria's family in 1846 by Franz Xaver Winterhalter Left to right: Prince Alfred and the Prince of Wales; the Queen and Prince Albert; Princesses Alice, Helena and Victoria

=== Issue ===
Name	Birth	Death	Spouse and children
Victoria, Princess Royal	1840; 21 Nov	1901; 5 August	Married 1858, Frederick, later German Emperor and King of Prussia (1831–1888); 4 sons (including Wilhelm II, German Emperor), 4 daughters (including Queen Sophia of Greece)
Edward VII	1841; 9 Nov	1910; 6 May	Married 1863, Princess Alexandra of Denmark (1844–1925); 3 sons (including King George V of the United Kingdom), 3 daughters (including Queen Maud of Norway)
Princess Alice	1843; 25 April	1878; 14 Dec	Married 1862, Louis IV, Grand Duke of Hesse and by Rhine (1837–1892); 2 sons, 5 daughters (including Empress Alexandra Feodorovna of Russia)
Alfred, Duke of Saxe-Coburg and Gotha	1844; 6 August	1900; 31 July	Married 1874, Grand Duchess Maria Alexandrovna of Russia (1853–1920); 2 sons (1 stillborn), 4 daughters (including Queen Marie of Romania)
Princess Helena	1846; 25 May	1923; 9 June	Married 1866, Prince Christian of Schleswig-Holstein (1831–1917); 4 sons (1 stillborn), 2 daughters
Princess Louise	1848; 18 March	1939; 3 Dec	Married 1871, John Campbell, Marquess of Lorne, later 9th Duke of Argyll (1845–1914); no issue
Prince Arthur, Duke of Connaught and Strathearn	1850; 1 May	1942; 16 Jan	Married 1879, Princess Louise Margaret of Prussia (1860–1917); 1 son, 2 daughters (including Crown Princess Margaret of Sweden)
Prince Leopold, Duke of Albany	1853; 7 April	1884; 28 March	Married 1882, Princess Helena of Waldeck and Pyrmont (1861–1922); 1 son, 1 daughter
Princess Beatrice	1857; 14 April	1944; 26 Oct	Married 1885, Prince Henry of Battenberg (1858–1896); 3 sons, 1 daughter (Queen Victoria Eugenie of Spain)

=== Ancestry ===
Ancestors of Queen Victoria

8. Frederick, Prince of Wales
4. George III of the United Kingdom
9. Princess Augusta of Saxe-Gotha
2. Prince Edward, Duke of Kent and Strathearn
10. Duke Charles Louis Frederick of Mecklenburg
5. Charlotte of Mecklenburg-Strelitz
11. Princess Elisabeth Albertine of Saxe-Hildburghausen
1. Victoria of the United Kingdom
12. Ernest Frederick, Duke of Saxe-Coburg-Saalfeld
6. Francis, Duke of Saxe-Coburg-Saalfeld
13. Princess Sophie Antoinette of Brunswick-Wolfenbüttel
3. Princess Victoria of Saxe-Coburg-Saalfeld
14. Heinrich XXIV, Count Reuss of Ebersdorf
7. Countess Augusta Reuss of Ebersdorf
15. Countess Karoline Ernestine of Erbach-Schönberg

=== Family tree ===
- Red borders indicate British monarchs
- Bold borders indicate children of British monarchs

Family of Queen Victoria, spanning the reigns of her grandfather, George III, to her grandson, George V

George III; 1738–1820 r.1760–1820	Charlotte of Mecklenburg-Strelitz; 1744–1818
George IV; 1762–1830 r.1820–1830	Caroline of Brunswick; 1768–1821	Frederick; Duke of York and Albany; 1763–1827	Frederica Charlotte of Prussia; 1767–1820	Adelaide of Saxe-Meiningen; 1792–1849	William IV; 1765–1837 r.1830–1837	Dorothea Jordan; 1761–1816	Charlotte; Princess Royal; 1766–1828	Frederick I King of Württemberg; 1754–1816	Edward; Duke of Kent and Strathearn; 1767–1820	Victoria of Saxe-Coburg-Saalfeld; 1786–1861	Augusta Sophia; 1768–1840
Illegitimate children
Elizabeth; 1770–1840	Frederick VI; Landgrave of Hesse-Homburg; 1769–1829	Ernest Augustus; King of Hanover; 1771–1851	Frederica of Mecklenburg-Strelitz; 1778–1841	Augustus Frederick; Duke of Sussex; 1773–1843	Adolphus; Duke of Cambridge; 1774–1850	Augusta of Hesse-Kassel; 1797–1889	Mary; 1776–1857	William Frederick; Duke of Gloucester and Edinburgh; 1776–1834	Sophia Matilda; 1777–1848	Octavius; 1779–1783	Alfred; 1780–1783	Amelia; 1783–1810
Leopold I King of the Belgians; 1790–1865	Charlotte of Wales; 1796–1817	George V King of Hanover; 1819–1878	Marie of Saxe-Altenburg; 1818–1907	Charlotte of Clarence; 1819	Elizabeth of Clarence; 1820–1821	George; Duke of Cambridge; 1819–1904	Augusta of Cambridge; 1822–1916	Frederick William; Grand Duke of Mecklenburg-Strelitz; 1819–1904	Mary Adelaide of Cambridge; 1833–1897	Francis; Duke of Teck; 1837–1900
William I King of Prussia, German Emperor; 1797–1888	Christian IX; King of Denmark; 1818–1906	Alexander II; Emperor of Russia; 1818–1881	Victoria; 1819–1901 r.1837–1901	Albert of Saxe-Coburg and Gotha; 1819–1861
Frederick III; German Emperor; 1831–1888	Victoria; Princess Royal; 1840–1901	Edward VII; 1841–1910 r.1901–1910	Alexandra of Denmark; 1844–1925	Alice; 1843–1878	Louis IV; Grand Duke of Hesse; 1837–1892	Alfred; Duke of Edinburgh/Saxe-Coburg and Gotha; 1844–1900	Maria of Russia; 1853–1920	Helena; 1846–1923	Christian of Schleswig-Holstein; 1831–1917
House of Oldenburg
Louise; 1848–1939	John Campbell; Duke of Argyll; 1845–1914	Arthur; Duke of Connaught and Strathearn; 1850–1942	Louise Margaret of Prussia; 1860–1917	Leopold; Duke of Albany; 1853–1884	Helena of Waldeck and Pyrmont; 1861–1922	Beatrice; 1857–1944	Henry of Battenberg; 1858–1896
Battenberg family
Wilhelm II; German Emperor; 1859–1941	Alfred of Saxe-Coburg and Gotha; 1874–1899	Marie of Edinburgh; 1875–1938	Ferdinand; King of Romania; 1865–1927	Ernest Louis; Grand Duke of Hesse; 1868–1937	Victoria Melita of Saxe-Coburg and Gotha; 1876–1936	Kirill Vladimirovich; Grand Duke of Russia; 1876–1938	Alexandra of Saxe-Coburg and Gotha; 1878–1942	Ernst II of Hohenlohe-Langenburg; 1863–1950	Beatrice of Saxe-Coburg and Gotha; 1884–1966	Alfonso; Duke of Galliera; 1886–1975
House of Hohenzollern	House of Hohenzollern-Sigmaringen	House of Hesse-Darmstadt	House of Romanov	House of Hohenlohe-Langenburg	House of Orléans-Galliera
Albert Victor; Duke of Clarence; 1864–1892	George V 1865–1936 r.1910–1936	Mary of Teck; 1867–1953	Louise; Princess Royal; 1867–1931	Alexander Duff; Duke of Fife; 1849–1912	Victoria; 1868–1935	Maud of Wales; 1869–1938	Haakon VII; King of Norway; 1872–1957	Alexander John of Wales; 1871

== Notes ==
Queen Victoria House of Hanover Cadet branch of the House of Welf Born: 24 May 1819 Died: 22 January 1901
Regnal titles
Preceded by William IV	Queen of the United Kingdom; 20 June 1837 – 22 January 1901	Succeeded by Edward VII
Position established	Empress of India; 1 May 1876 – 22 January 1901	Succeeded by Edward VII
