= Dale Haney =

White House grounds superintendent (born 1951)

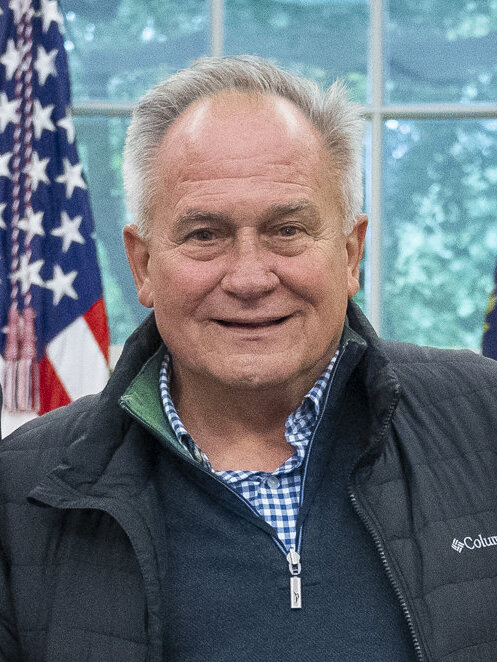
- Haney in October 2022
- Born: November 4, 1951 (age 74)
- Education: Sandhills College
- Occupation: Superintendent of White House grounds

Dale Haney (born November 4, 1951) is an American gardener who is the superintendent of the White House grounds. In 2022, he celebrated his 50th anniversary tending to the 18 acres of White House gardens and grounds. He has also taken responsibility to walk presidential dogs from Richard Nixon's Irish Setter King Timahoe to Joe Biden's German Shepherd Commander.

== Background ==
Haney received a bachelor's degree in horticulture from Sandhills College at Pinehurst, North Carolina. He then accepted an internship at the Dumbarton Oaks historic estate in the Georgetown neighborhood of Washington, D.C.

== White House service ==
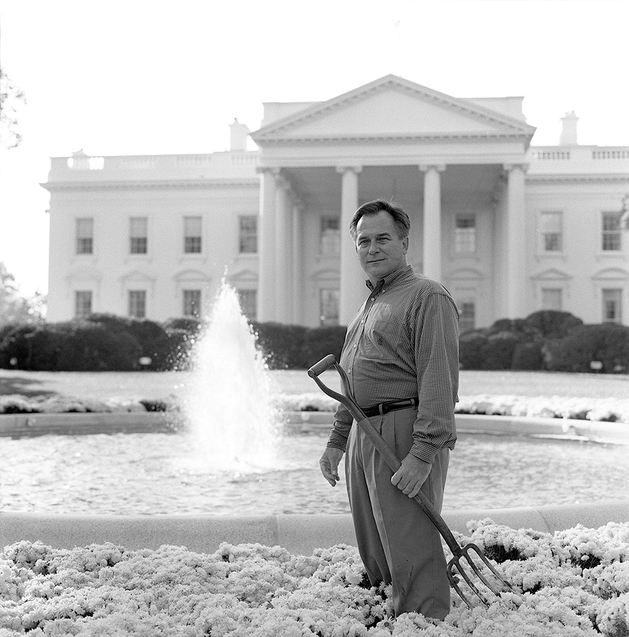
Haney in front of the White House, November 2001

In early 1972, Haney was hired as a gardener at the White House. His titles over the years included gardener, foreman, and chief horticulturalist. He became superintendent of the White House grounds in 2008. His responsibilities have included serving as the White House's chief bird chaser, giving garden tours, overseeing the White House Rose Garden, preparing the grounds for events ranging from the White House Easter Egg Rolls to state arrival ceremonies, selecting White House Christmas trees, and tending to the plants in the Oval Office.

Haney has also been the dog walker for presidential dogs, starting with Richard Nixon's Irish Setter King Timahoe and continuing through George W. Bush's Scottish Terriers, Barney and Miss Beazley, Barack Obama's Portuguese Water Dog Bo, and Joe Biden's German Shepherd Commander. He recalled having an especially loving relationship with George W. Bush's dogs, one of which was born at the White House and was euthanized in 2004 after several strokes. During the September 11 attacks, Haney collected President Bush's pets from the White House residence and "kept them safe until they could be reunited with first lady Laura Bush."

In 2022, Haney celebrated his 50th anniversary working at the White House. At the time, the White House History Quarterly published a special issue devoted to Haney's career, and first lady Jill Biden cited his service to ten presidents and noted that she and her husband were "forever grateful for his continued service."

On September 13, 2023, Dale Haney was bitten by Joe Biden's German Shepherd Commander. This resulted in the dog being evicted on October 5, 2023, from the White House.
