= Major (Joe Biden's dog) =

Pet dog of the Biden family (born 2018)

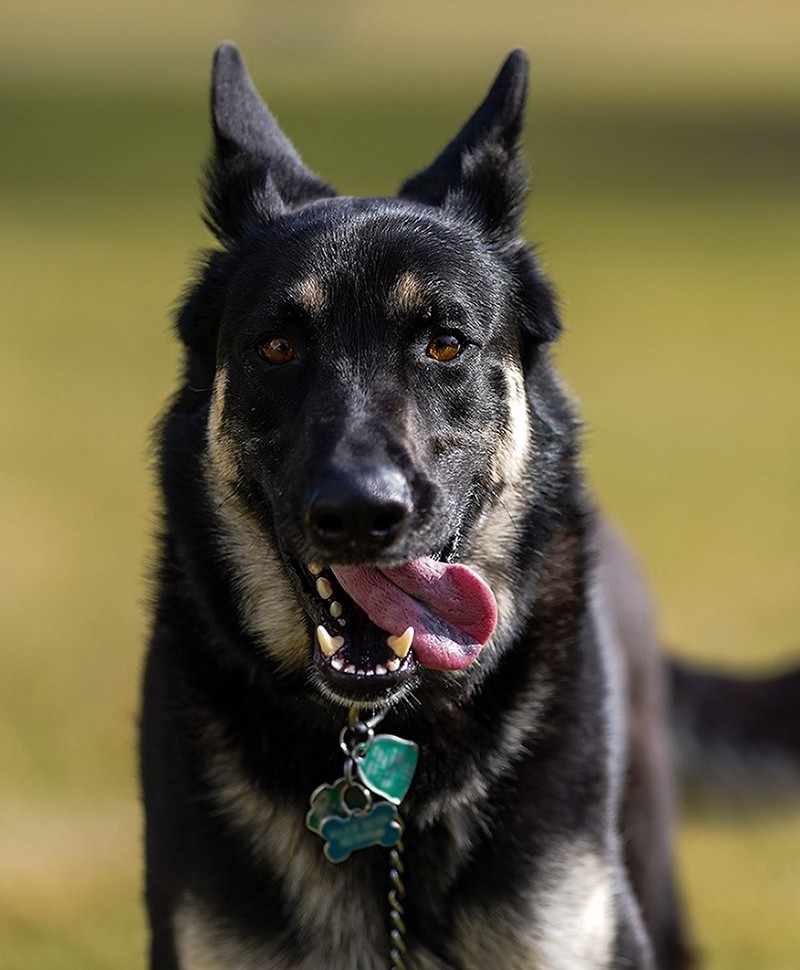
- Major in 2021
- Breed: German Shepherd
- Sex: Male
- Born: January 17, 2018 (age 8); Wilmington, Delaware, U.S.
- Years active: 2021-present
- Known for: United States presidential pet
- Term: January 20, 2021 – December 21, 2021
- Predecessor: Bo and Sunny
- Successor: Commander and Willow
- Owner: Biden family (2018-21) Steven A. Patterson (2021-present)
- Appearance: Black and tan blanket back
- Named after: Major Beau Biden

Major (born January 17, 2018) is a German Shepherd owned by Joe Biden's family. Major was the first shelter dog to live in the White House.

Major was a rescue from a litter that had been exposed to "something toxic" in their home, and their owner was unable to afford the expense of veterinary care for them. He was fostered by the Bidens earlier that year from the Delaware Humane Association's shelter and has been with them since late 2018. On the day Joe Biden adopted the dog from the shelter, he stayed "telling stories and taking selfies with staffers" for over an hour. The origin of Major's name is in memory of Beau Biden, Joe Biden's son, who was a major in the Delaware National Guard.

== Incidents ==
On November 28, 2020, then-president-elect Biden fractured his foot while playing with Major. Biden said in an interview that Major was waiting to play after the president-elect emerged from a shower: "I'm joking, running after him and grab his tail. And what happened was that he slid on a throw rug, and I tripped on the rug he slid on."

On March 8, 2021, Major and Champ, Biden's other German Shepherd, were temporarily moved to live with a family friend in Delaware after a minor incident in which Major nipped a security guard. Major has been known for displaying agitated behavior on multiple occasions, in the past including "jumping, barking, and charging" at staff and security. Joe Biden noted in an interview that the bite did not penetrate the skin. They returned to the White House on March 24 after Major received some training, including training on how to live with a future cat that the Bidens adopted in the White House. On March 30, Major was involved in a second biting incident at the White House, having bitten a National Park Service employee during a walk.

Major is not the first presidential dog to have biting incidents. In separate incidents, Franklin D. Roosevelt's dog, also a German Shepherd named Major, bit United States senator Hattie Wyatt Caraway, and attacked Prime Minister of the United Kingdom Ramsay MacDonald, tearing MacDonald's pants off. Theodore Roosevelt's Bull Terrier Pete bit numerous people, even tearing the pants off of ambassador of France to the United States Jean Jules Jusserand.

== Political activities ==
In July 2020, Biden's granddaughter, Naomi, posted a tweet showcasing Champ and Major fighting over a Donald Trump chew toy. Though the tweet was subsequently deleted, the photo resurfaced on social media before the 2020 United States presidential election.

Champ and Major both appeared in advertisements for Biden in his 2020 presidential campaign against President Donald Trump who had no pets in the White House. During the campaign Biden tweeted that "Some Americans celebrate #NationalCatDay, some celebrate #NationalDogDay...President Trump celebrates neither. It says a lot. It's time we put a pet back in the White House."

Three days before the inauguration of Joe Biden, the Delaware Humane Association held an "indoguration" for Major. More than 7,400 people attended via Zoom and it featured a performance by Josh Groban. The event raised $200,000 in donations for the association.

== Departure from the White House ==
In December 2021, on the day the Bidens announced a new puppy, Commander, was to move into the White House, it was announced that Major would no longer be a resident there, after experts recommended that it would be safer for him to live in a quieter environment with family friends.

Commander turned out to have biting problems as well. He was involved in at least two dozen such incidents before he was removed from the White House.

On April 29, 2026, Mississippi politician Steven A. Patterson revealed that he was the "undisclosed family friend" who adopted Major. In a column for NEMiss.news, an online news site for northeast Mississippi where he is a regular contributor, Patterson said he met Joe Biden in 1973, soon after he was sworn in to the U.S. Senate. Patterson was a junior staffer for Stennis at the time. He wrote of their close friendship:

I have stayed in the Biden families’ homes many times, and they have stayed with me on several occasions. I’ve been honored to be their guest at family affairs where I was the only person present who did not have Biden as a last name. I was the first state Democratic Party chair to endorse his candidacy for the Presidency in 1988 and served as his southern campaign coordinator. I have raised money for each of his races and traveled all over the country with him, speaking on his behalf. In short, we have shared life’s ups and downs for over 50 years.

Their friendship was strained after Biden assumed the presidency, which Patterson wrote "often leaves no room for old friends, because friends associated with the political role take up all the air."

Patterson also revealed that Major was named after Biden's son, Beau Biden, who served as a major in the Delaware National Guard. Some have speculated the Bidens named the dog after President Franklin D. Roosevelt's dog Major.

Patterson said Major is doing well in Mississippi:

I’m pleased to report that Major has adapted just fine and is a happy dog who is a pleasure to be around. He loves playing with the other dogs and is amazed by the horses, following them all day. He still has some quirky phobias like being frightened of storms and he can’t stand fire of any kind. In the winter when we build a fire in the fireplace, he quickly retreats to the bathroom, nervously hiding securely in the shower.

== Gallery ==
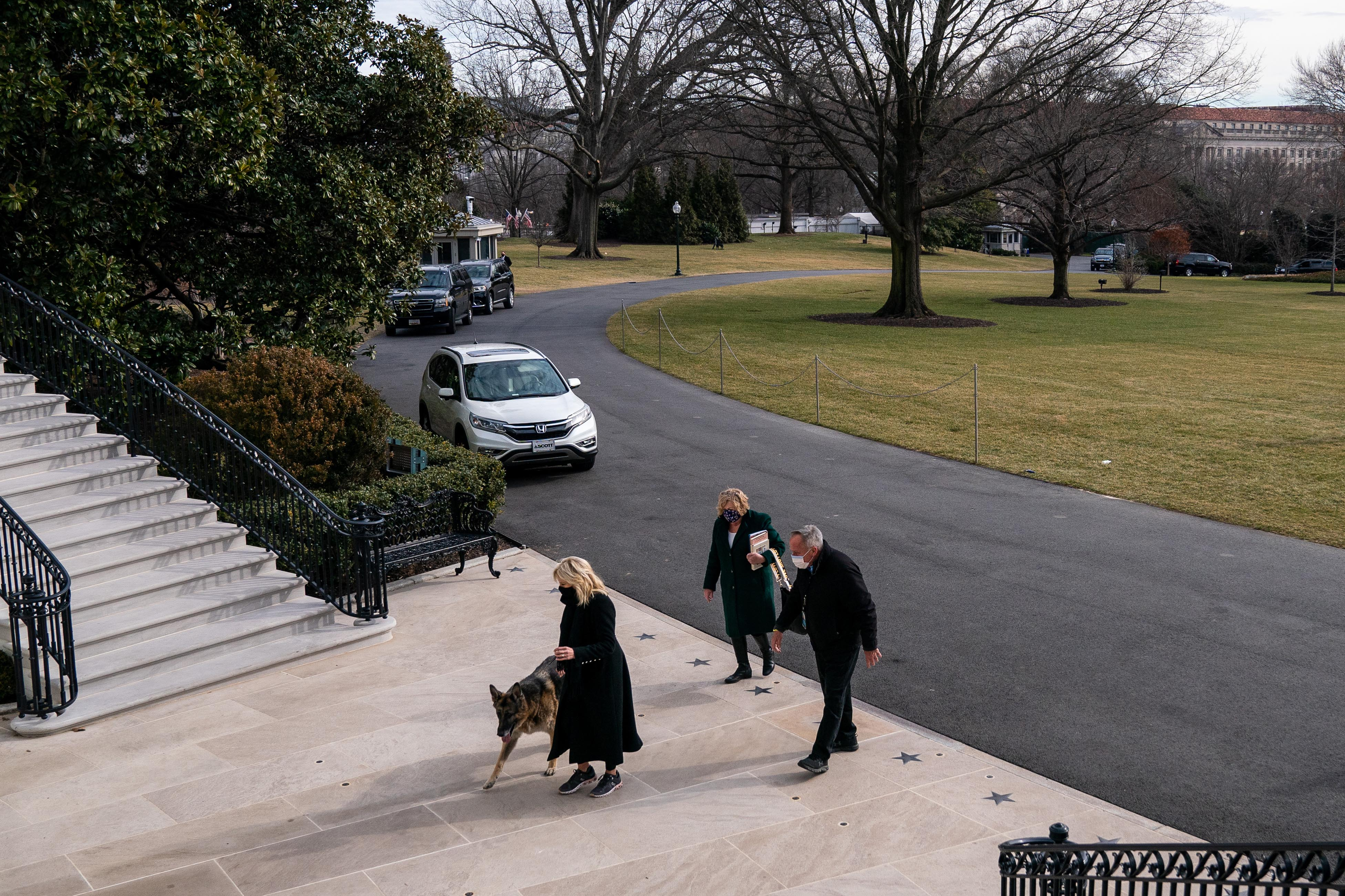
Champ and Major arrive at the White House in January 2021.

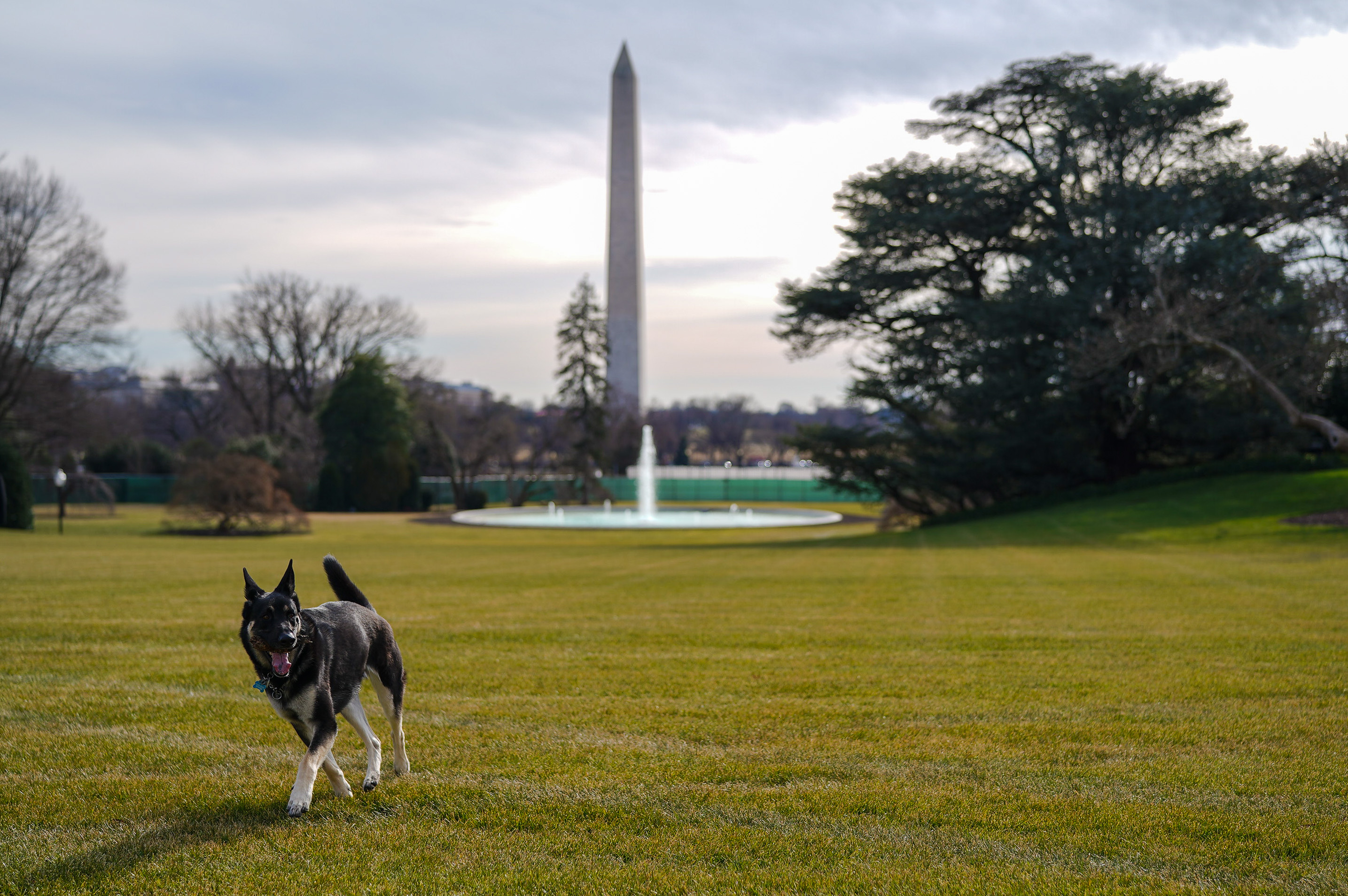
Major on the White House lawn in January 2021

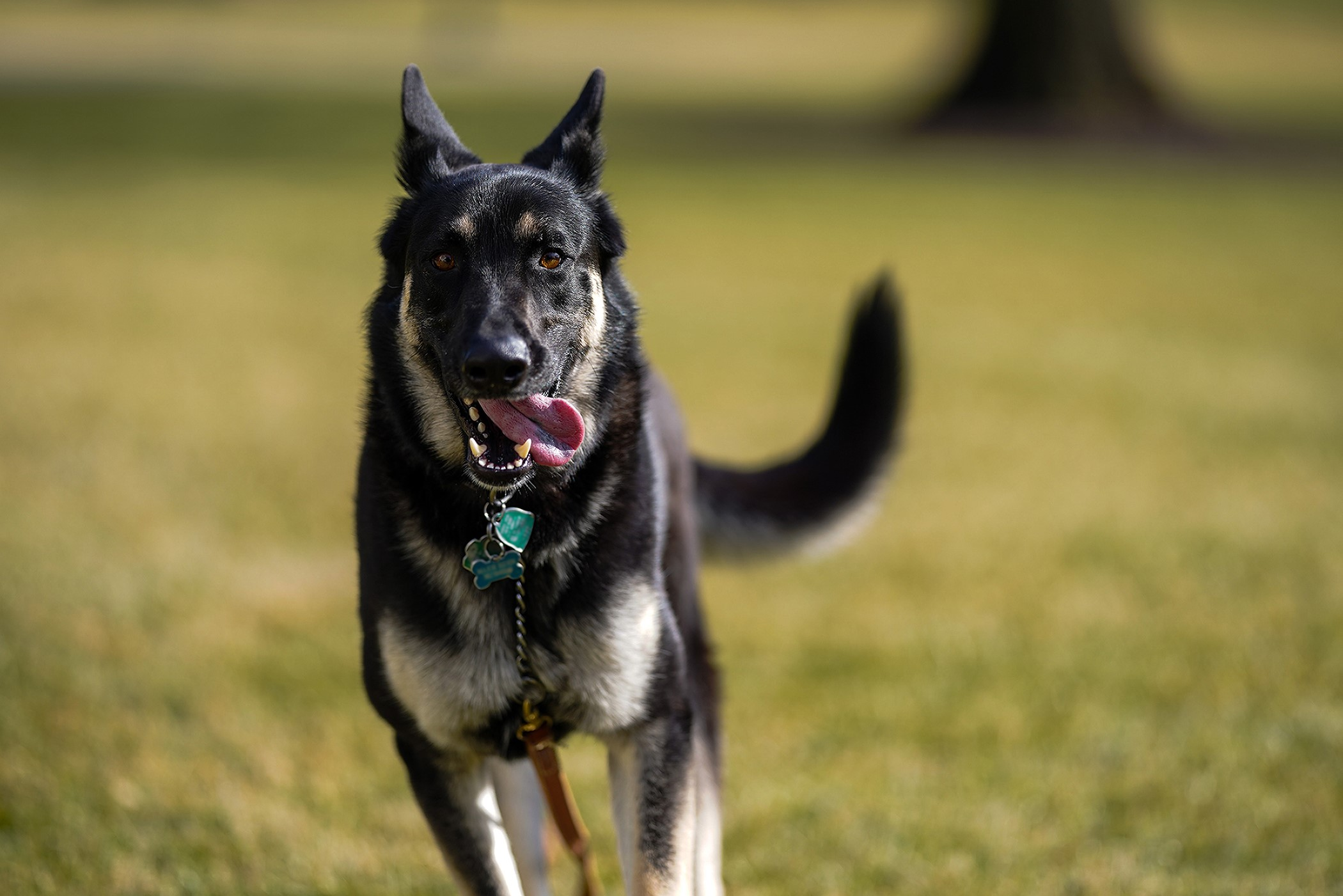
Major running on the White House lawn in January 2021

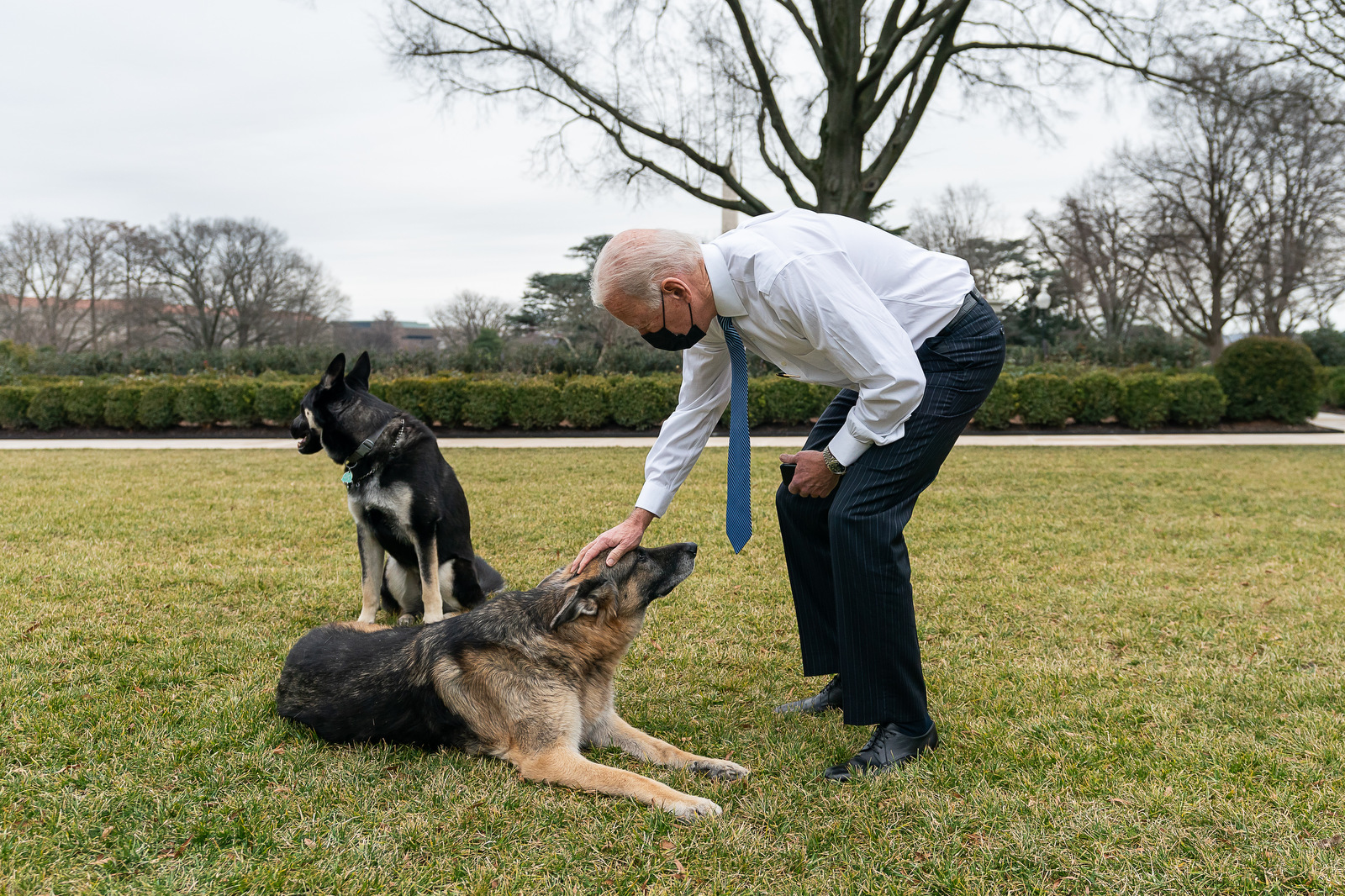
President Biden playing with Champ and Major in the White House Rose Garden in January 2021

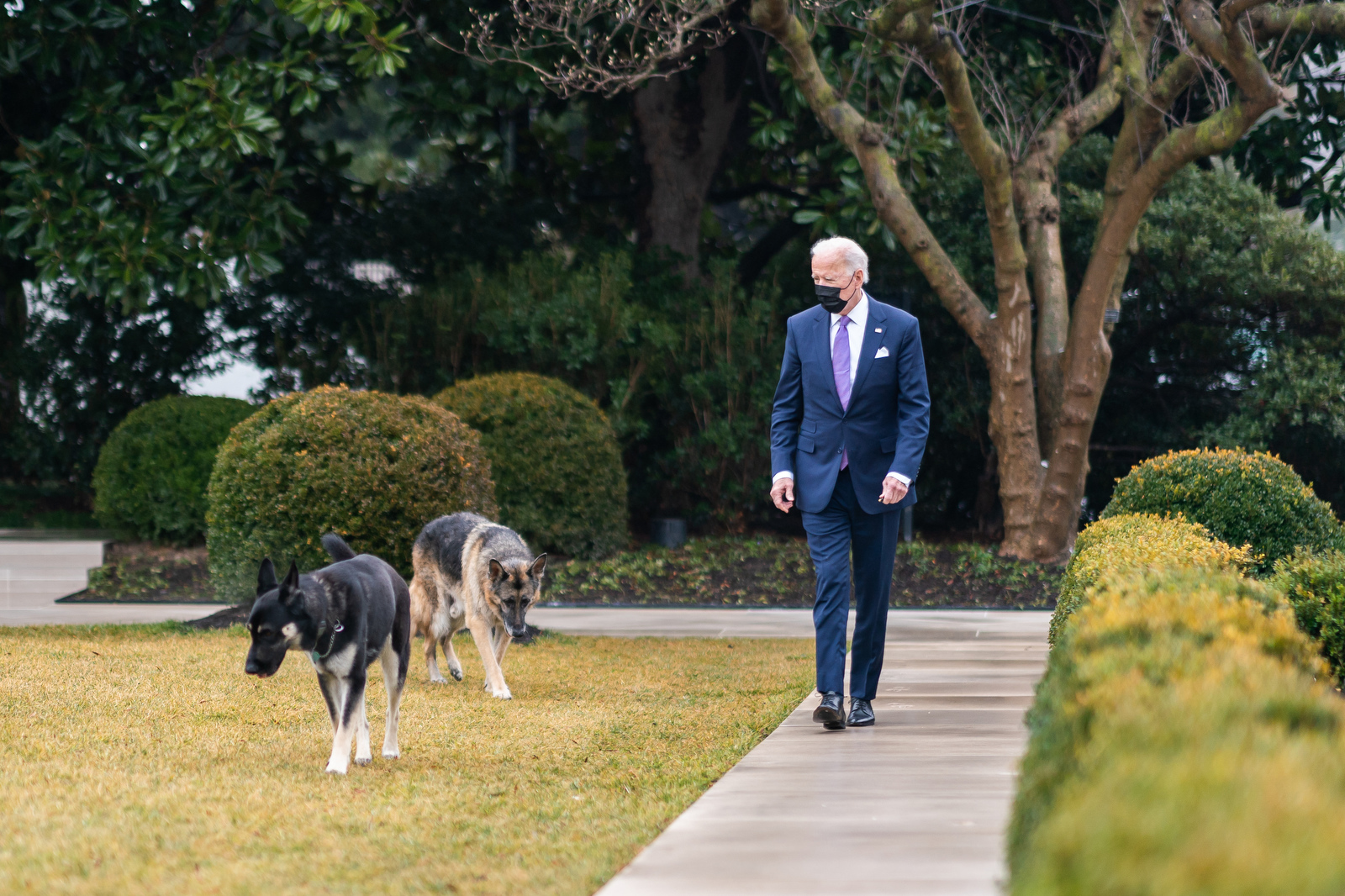
President Biden walking with Champ and Major through the White House Rose Garden in January 2021

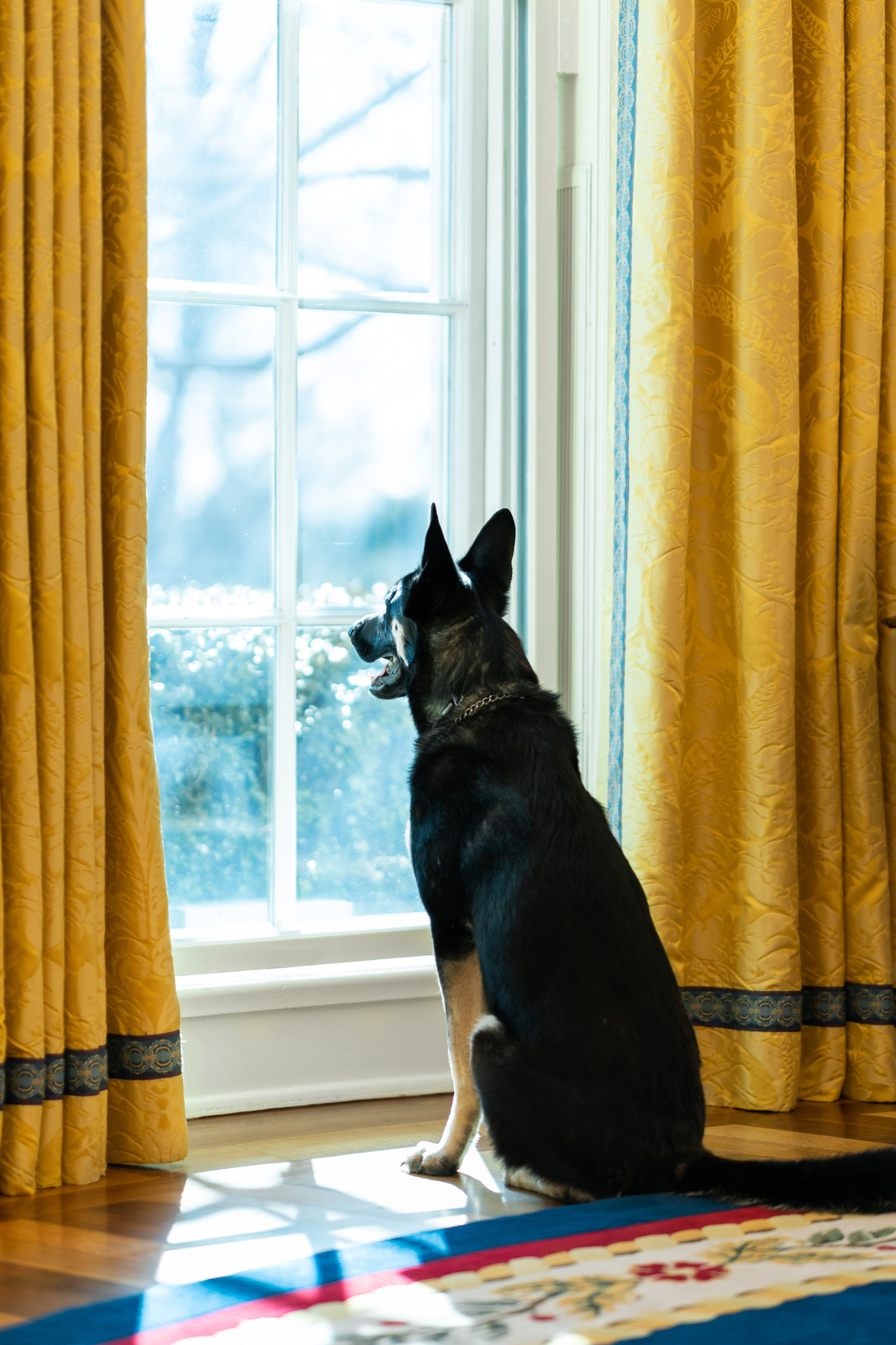
Major in the Oval Office in January 2021

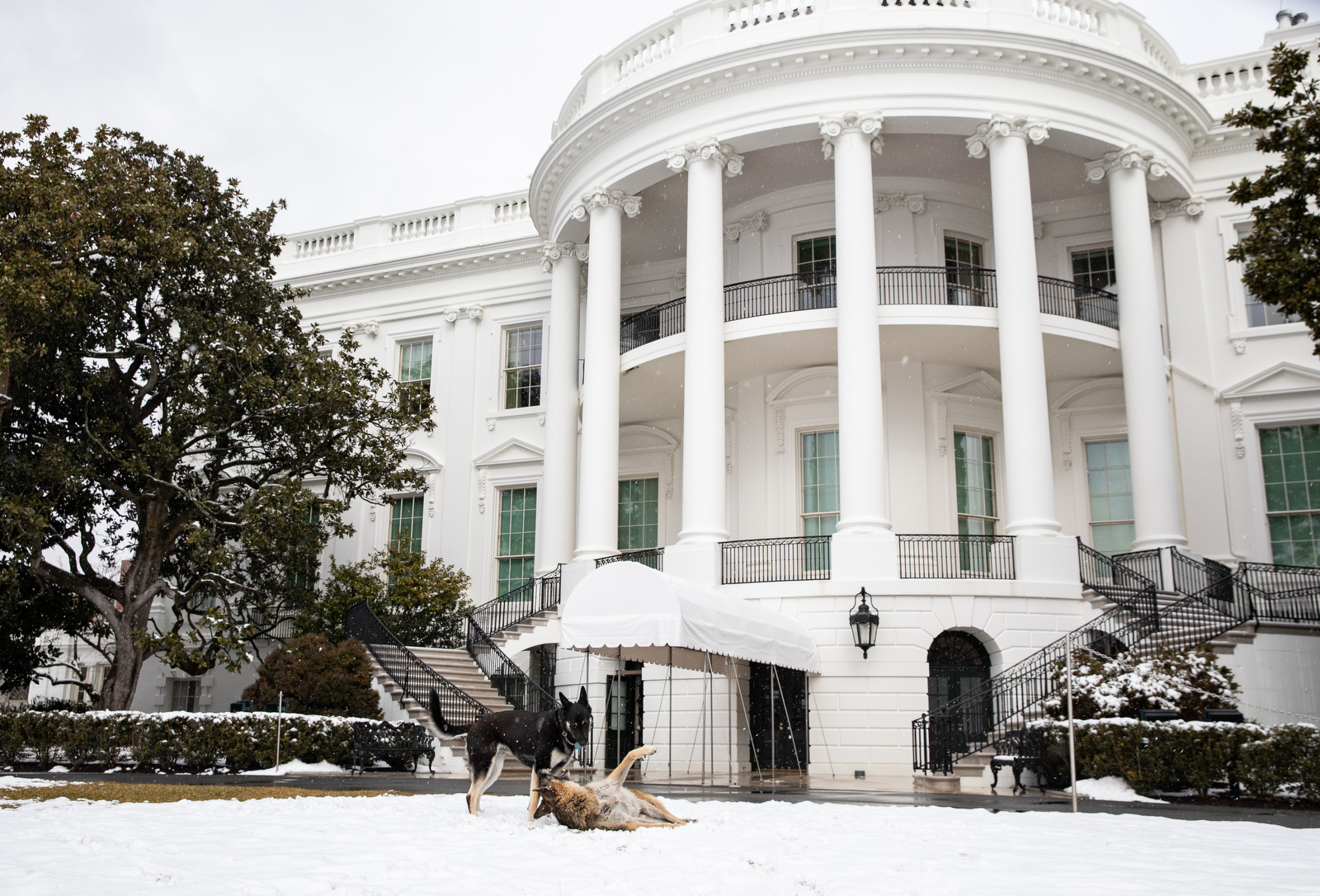
Champ and Major playing in the snow on the South Lawn of the White House in February 2021

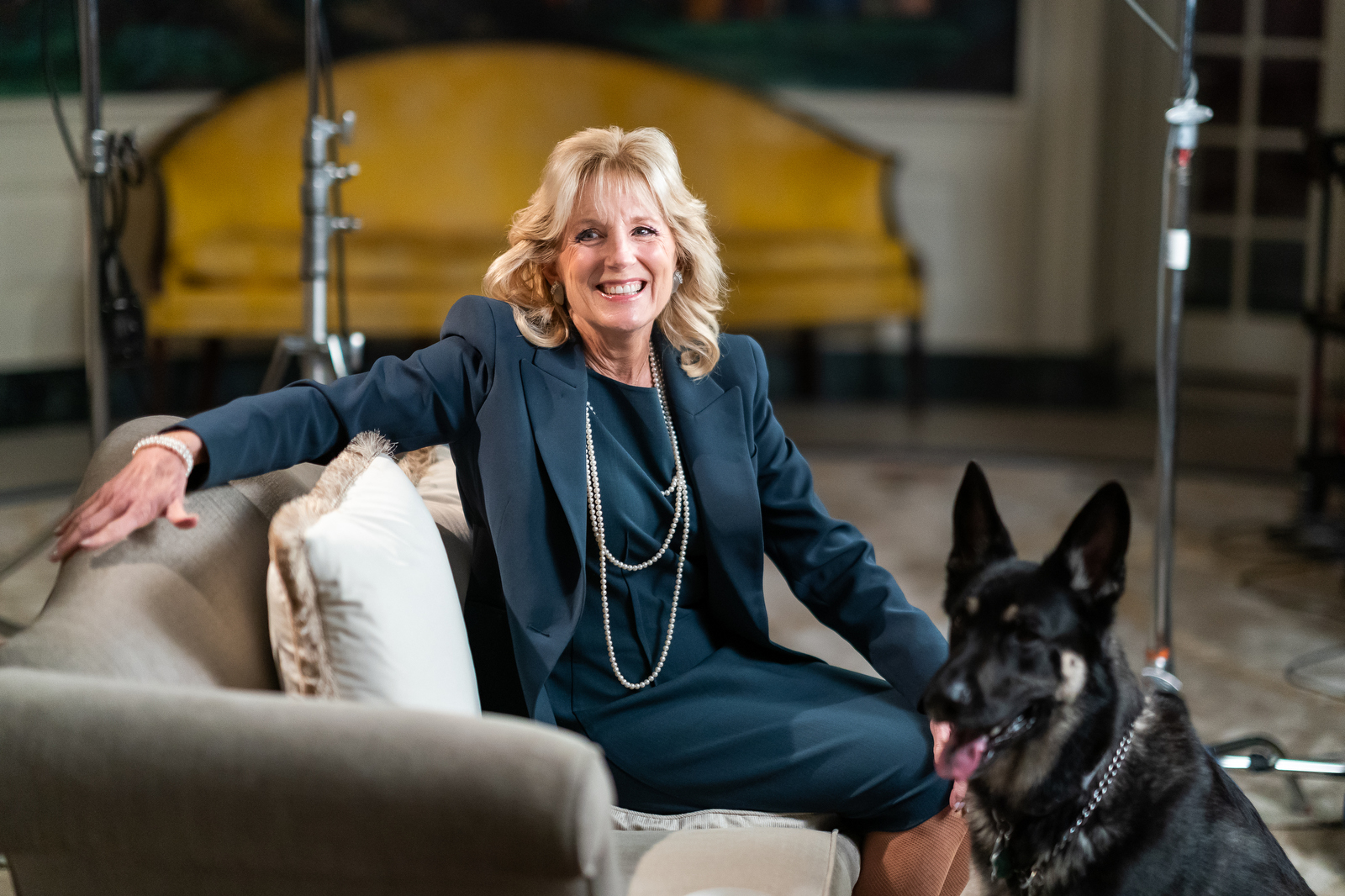
Major and Jill Biden in the Diplomatic Reception Room of the White House in February 2021

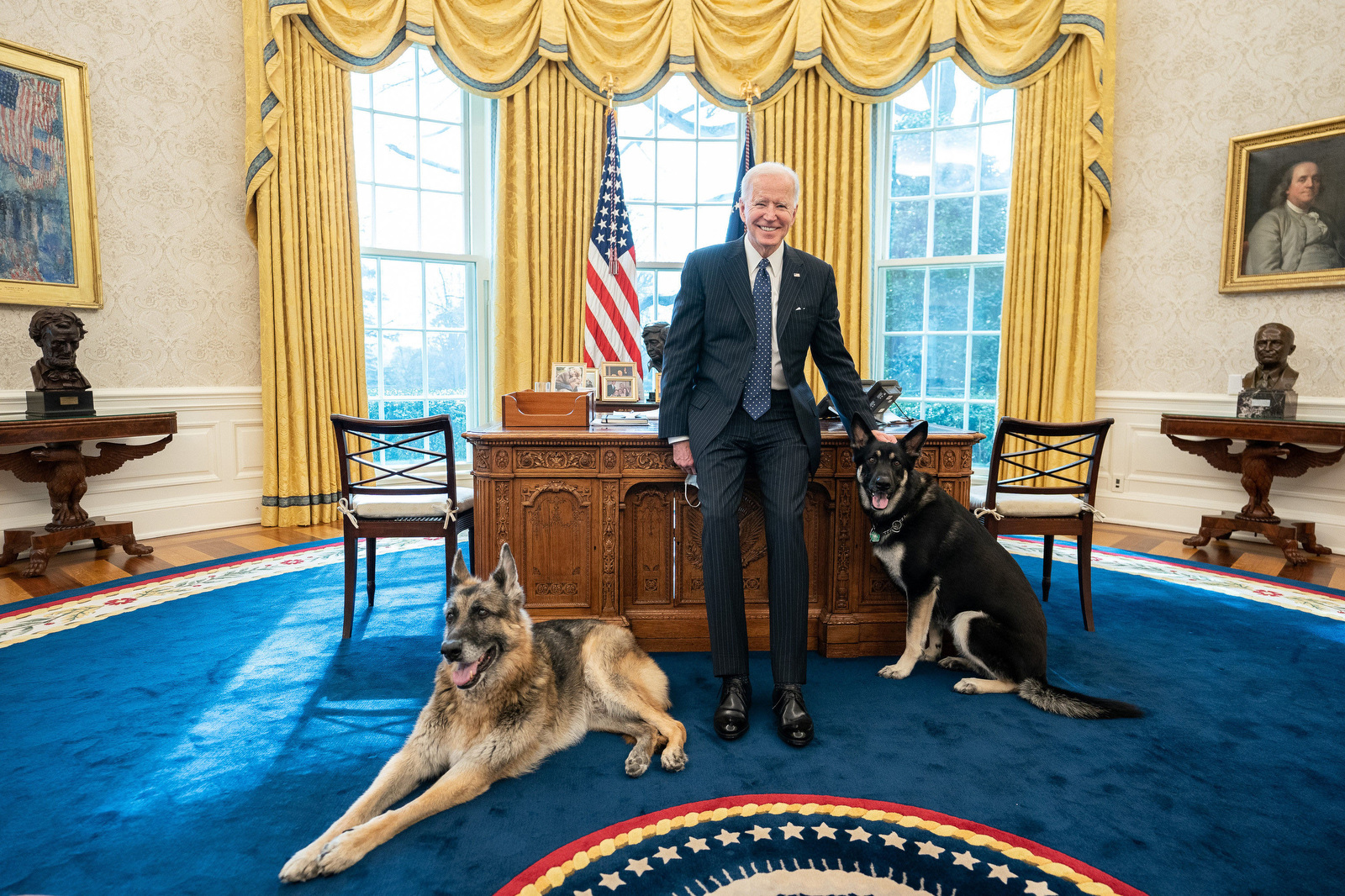
President Biden with Champ and Major in the Oval Office in February 2021

== See also ==
- List of individual dogs
- United States presidential pets

Honorary titles
Preceded by Bo and Sunny; Barack Obama's Portuguese Water Dogs (January 20, 2017)	White House pet dogs January 20, 2021 – December 21, 2021; Served alongside: Champ (Until June 19, 2021); Commander (Since December 20, 2021)	Succeeded by Commander as sole presidential dog
