= Major (Franklin D. Roosevelt's dog) =

American presidential pet

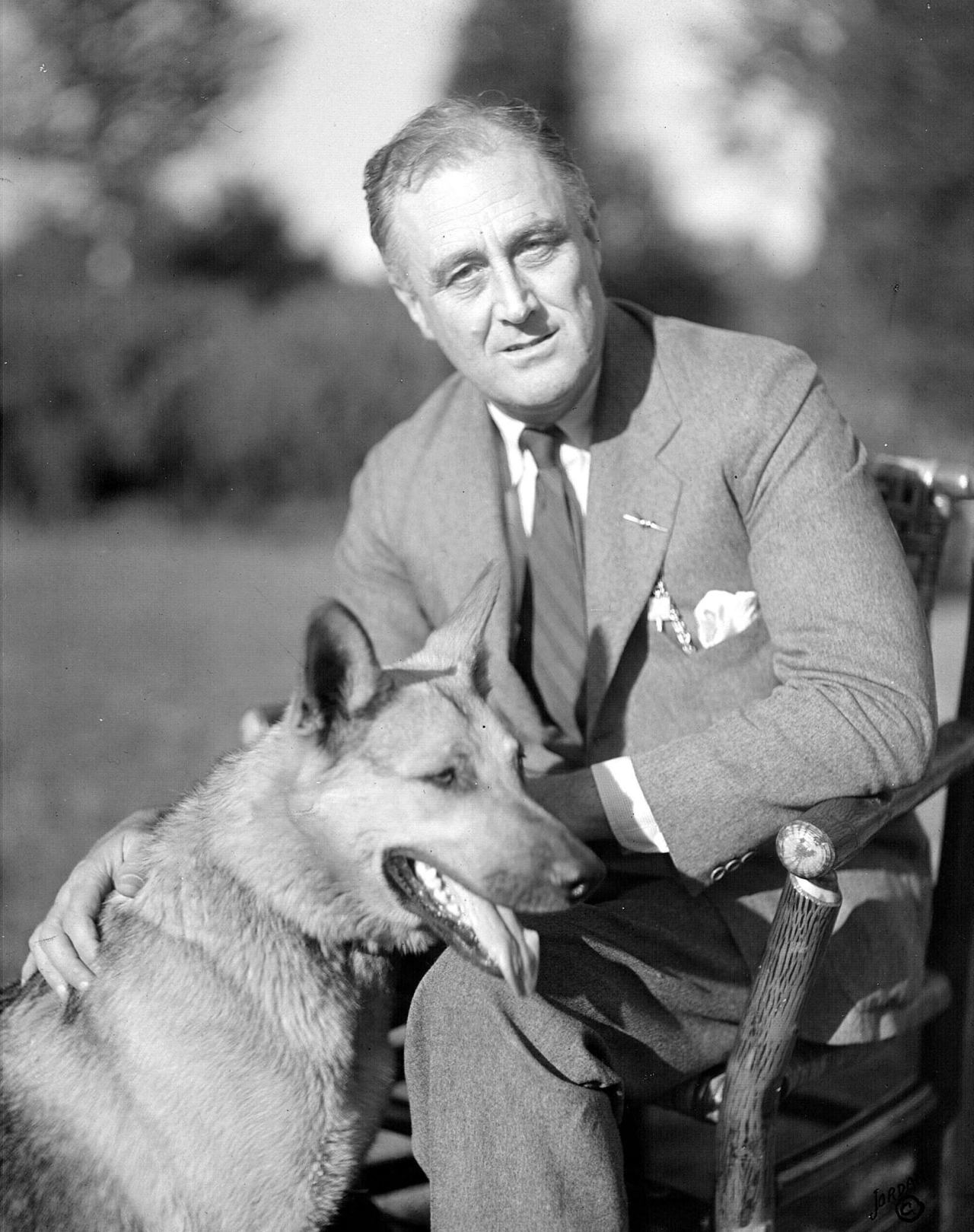
- Franklin D. Roosevelt with Major, 1933
- Species: Canis familiaris
- Breed: German Shepherd
- Occupation: Presidential pet (originally a police dog)
- Owners: Franklin D. Roosevelt, Eleanor Roosevelt

Major, a German Shepherd, was a presidential pet belonging to United States president Franklin D. Roosevelt.

In 1933, while living at the White House, Major had incidents in which he bit United States Senator Hattie Wyatt Caraway and Prime Minister of the United Kingdom Ramsay MacDonald. After the latter incident, he was sent to live at Roosevelt's private residence in Hyde Park, New York and never returned to the White House.

== Early life ==
Major had originally been a police dog. When Roosevelt was governor of New York, he was gifted to Roosevelt by the New York State Police.

A November 1932 article in the Brooklyn Eagle described Major's personality as "sedate", and described Roosevelt, who had multiple dogs, as being partial towards Major.

== Life at the White House ==
Ahead of Roosevelt's inauguration, Major, along with the Roosevelts' other dog Meggie, took a six-hour car ride with Eleanor Roosevelt to travel from New York to Washington, D.C.

Major was known to chase the White House maids, who would wield their brooms and dust mops to ward him off.

On March 24, 1933, Eleanor Roosevelt said that she had twice taken Major on trips to Rock Creek Park, and he got into fights with other dogs on both trips. She said that if he accompanied her to the park in the future, he would do so wearing a muzzle.

On April 29, 1933, Major bit Hattie Wyatt Caraway (a United States senator) at a White House party.

In 1933, Ramsay MacDonald (prime minister of the United Kingdom) made an official state visit to the White House, the first time such a visit had occurred during Roosevelt's presidency. During this visit, Major nipped MacDonald and tore off the bottom of his pants. After this incident, Major was sent to live at Roosevelt's residence in Hyde Park, New York and never returned to the White House. Similarly, decades earlier, President Theodore Roosevelt had exiled his Bull Terrier Pete from the White House after he bit numerous people, even tearing the pants off Jean Jules Jusserand (ambassador of France to the United States).

== Comparisons to Joe Biden's dog of the same name ==
In 2021, Major and his biting incidents received new attention when United States President Joe Biden's dog named Major, also a German Shepherd, had incidents in which he bit people at the White House.

== See also ==
- List of individual dogs
- United States presidential pets
