= Champ (dog) =

Pet dog of the Biden family (2008–2021)

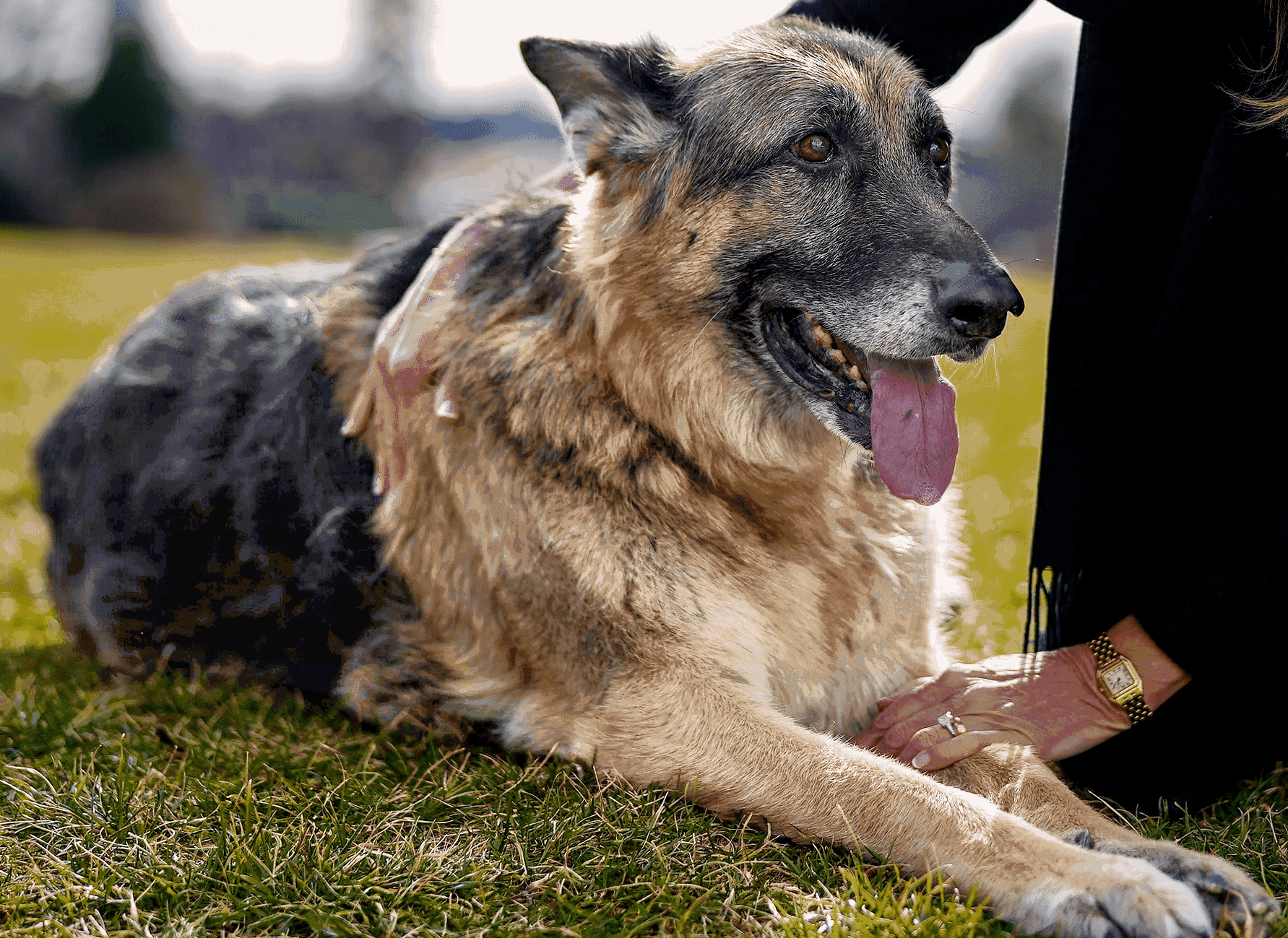
- Champ in 2021
- Breed: German Shepherd
- Sex: Male
- Born: November 11, 2008; Scranton, Pennsylvania, U.S.
- Died: June 19, 2021 (aged 12); Wilmington, Delaware, U.S.
- Known for: United States presidential and vice presidential pet
- Term: January 20, 2021 – June 19, 2021
- Predecessor: Bo and Sunny
- Successor: Major, Commander and Willow
- Owner: Biden family
- Appearance: Black and tan saddle back

Champ (November 11, 2008 – June 19, 2021) was a German Shepherd owned by Joe Biden's family. He joined them in living at the White House in 2021. Champ was the older of the two German Shepherds the Bidens owned at the start of his presidency. The younger German Shepherd was Major.

== Biography ==
Biden promised his wife he would purchase a dog after the 2008 presidential election, irrespective of whether he and Barack Obama won the race. Jill Biden taped different pictures of dogs on seats of Biden's campaign plane for him to see. He purchased the dog as a puppy from a breeder in Pennsylvania, born November 11, 2008. It was named Champ by his granddaughters. Champ's name reminded Biden of advice given to him by his father, who said, "Any time you get knocked down, champ, get up!" Biden has an affinity for German Shepherds, having trained them in the past. Biden would give children small plush toys of Champ during his vice presidency.

Champ lived at Number One Observatory Circle during Biden's tenure as vice president. On January 24, 2021, four days after Biden's inauguration as president, Champ and Major, the Bidens' younger German Shepherd, moved into the White House.

On June 19, 2021, the White House announced that Champ had died in Wilmington, Delaware. "In our most joyful moments and in our most grief-stricken days, he was there with us, sensitive to our every unspoken feeling and emotion," the statement read. "We love our sweet, good boy and will miss him always." The White House said that Champ "passed away peacefully at home".

== See also ==
- List of individual dogs

Honorary titles
Preceded by Bo and Sunny; Barack Obama's Portuguese Water Dogs (January 20, 2017)	White House pet dogs January 20, 2021 – June 19, 2021; Served alongside: Major	Succeeded by Major (as sole presidential dog)
