= Sunny (dog) =

Pet dog of the Obama family (2012–2026)

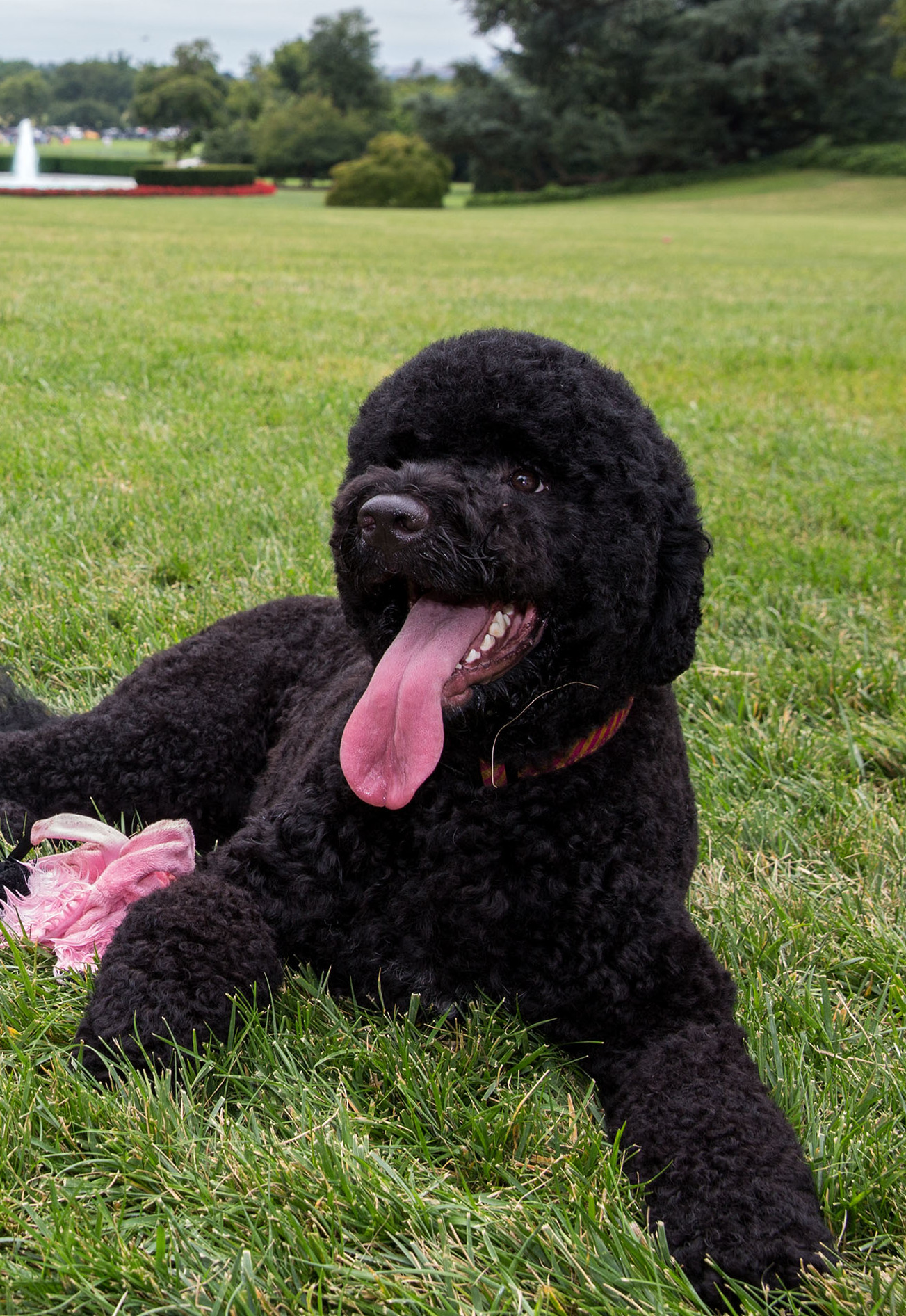
- Sunny in 2013
- Other name: First Dog of the United States
- Species: Canis lupus familiaris
- Breed: Portuguese Water Dog
- Sex: Female
- Born: June 11, 2012; Lansing, Michigan, U.S.
- Died: September 15, 2026 (aged 14)
- Known for: Pet of the First family of the United States (first dog)
- Title: First Dog of the United States
- Term: August 19, 2013 – January 20, 2017
- Predecessor: Barney and Miss Beazley
- Successor: Champ and Major
- Owner: Family of Barack Obama
- Appearance: Black
- Named after: Personality

Sunny (June 11, 2012 – September 15, 2026) was a pet dog of the family of Barack Obama, the 44th presidential family of the United States. Sunny was a female Portuguese Water Dog who was a First Dog of the United States along with Bo. Sunny was introduced via First Lady Michelle Obama's Twitter account on August 19, 2013.

On September 16, 2026, it was announced by Barack and Michelle Obama on various social media platforms that Sunny had died the previous day. She was 14.

== Breeding and original owners ==
Sunny was a purebred Portuguese Water Dog and was selected from a breeder in the Great Lakes area.

== Media response ==
Although Sunny was purchased from a breeder, president of the Humane Society of the United States Wayne Pacelle wrote on a blog post, "As we always say in such circumstances, we hope the Obamas considered adoption or rescue as the first choice in obtaining a pet." He further went on to thank the Obama family for making a contribution to the Humane Society in Sunny's name, and helping reduce the suffering of dogs, although he would like the policies to finally become law.

== Incidents ==
There were minor incidents involving Sunny. In 2013, at an arts and crafts event for military families, Sunny knocked over a 2-year-old girl while in front of Michelle Obama. However, the child was unharmed. Sunny was not aggressive towards the child, licking her face. In January 2017, Sunny reportedly bit a White House visitor on the face, leaving a cut under the visitor's eye, which required stitches. The visitor, who was a teen friend of Malia, was treated by the president's physician, Dr. Ronny Jackson.

== See also ==
- Bo
- List of individual dogs
- United States presidential pets

Honorary titles
Preceded by Bo (as sole presidential dog)	White House pet dog August 19, 2013–January 20, 2017; Served alongside: Bo	Succeeded by Champ and Major; Joe Biden's German Shepherds (January 20, 2021)
