= Commander (dog) =

Pet dog of the Biden family (born 2021)

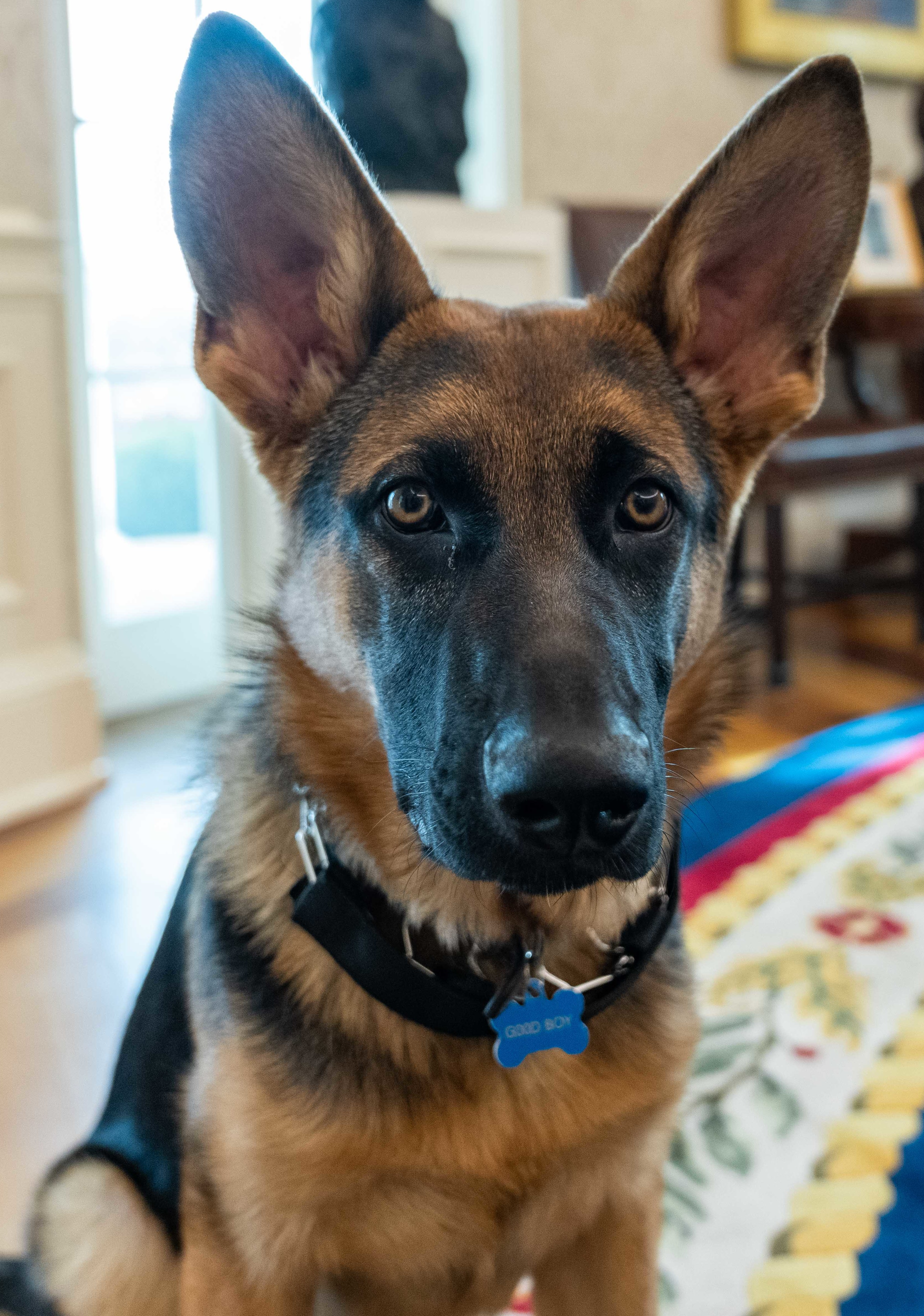
- Commander in 2022
- Breed: German Shepherd
- Sex: Male
- Born: September 1, 2021 (age 5)
- Known for: United States presidential pet
- Term: December 20, 2021 – October 5, 2023
- Predecessor: Champ and Major
- Owner: Biden family

Commander (born September 1, 2021) is a German Shepherd owned by former president of the United States Joe Biden and former first lady Jill Biden.

== Life ==
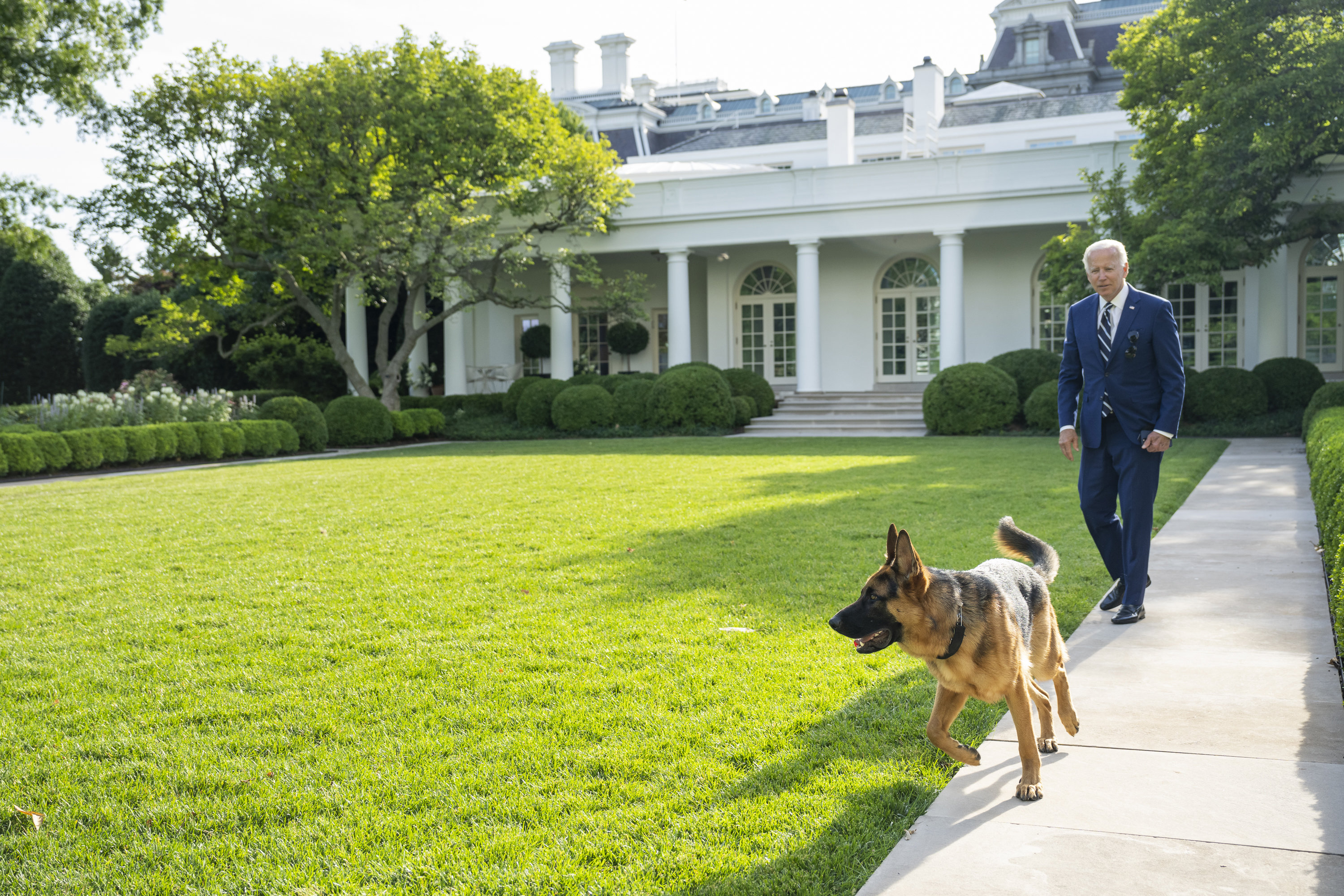
Commander and President Joe Biden walking on the White House Rose Garden; June 21, 2022

Commander was a birthday gift to Joe Biden from James and Sara Biden, his brother and sister-in-law. Commander first came to the White House on December 20, 2021. That same day, Major, another dog owned by the Biden family, was removed from the White House following several biting incidents. On February 13, 2022, Commander made his TV debut in the program Puppy Bowl XVIII.

On June 15, 2023, Commander raced toward a Secret Service agent and lunged at him, causing a "deep bite" on the left arm that was reported to have needed stitches. "East Wing Tours were stopped for approximately 20 minutes due to blood from the incident being on the floors in the area of the Book-sellers," a hall in the White House, one document reported. Records released on July 25, 2023, by Judicial Watch showed that Commander bit or attacked Secret Service agents at least 10 times between October 2022 and July 2023. Commander was involved in an eleventh biting incident on September 26. Commander also bit White House grounds superintendent Dale Haney, who has taken responsibility for walking presidential dogs since the presidency of Richard Nixon, on September 13, 2023, in an incident that was photographed by a tourist and subsequently received media attention.

On October 5, 2023, it was announced that Commander was moving out of the White House due to the numerous biting incidents. CNN later reported that there were at least 24 such events.

In her 2024 autobiography, South Dakota governor Kristi Noem suggested that Commander should be killed, calling him "dangerous and unpredictable". In the same memoir, Noem discussed shooting her own dog.

== See also ==
- United States presidential pets
- List of individual dogs

Honorary titles
Preceded by Major (as sole presidential dog)	White House pet dogs December 20, 2021 – October 5, 2023; Served alongside: Major (Until December 21, 2021)	Succeeded by Vacant
