= Dawn Sylvia-Stasiewicz =

- Born: February 16, 1958
- Died: January 12, 2011 (aged 52)
- Occupation: Dog trainer

Dawn Sylvia-Stasiewicz (February 16, 1958 – January 12, 2011) was an American dog trainer. She trained dogs such as U.S. president Barack Obama's dog Bo, and Senator Edward Kennedy's three dogs.

Sylvia-Stasiewicz lived with and trained Bo before knowing who his owners were. She had been suggested to the family by Vicki Kennedy, wife of Senator Kennedy, who had told her that the dog was for a "very busy family with two young daughters".

Sylvia-Stasiewicz died on January 12, 2011, at the age of 52.
