= Bo (dog) =

Pet dog of the Obama family (2008–2021)

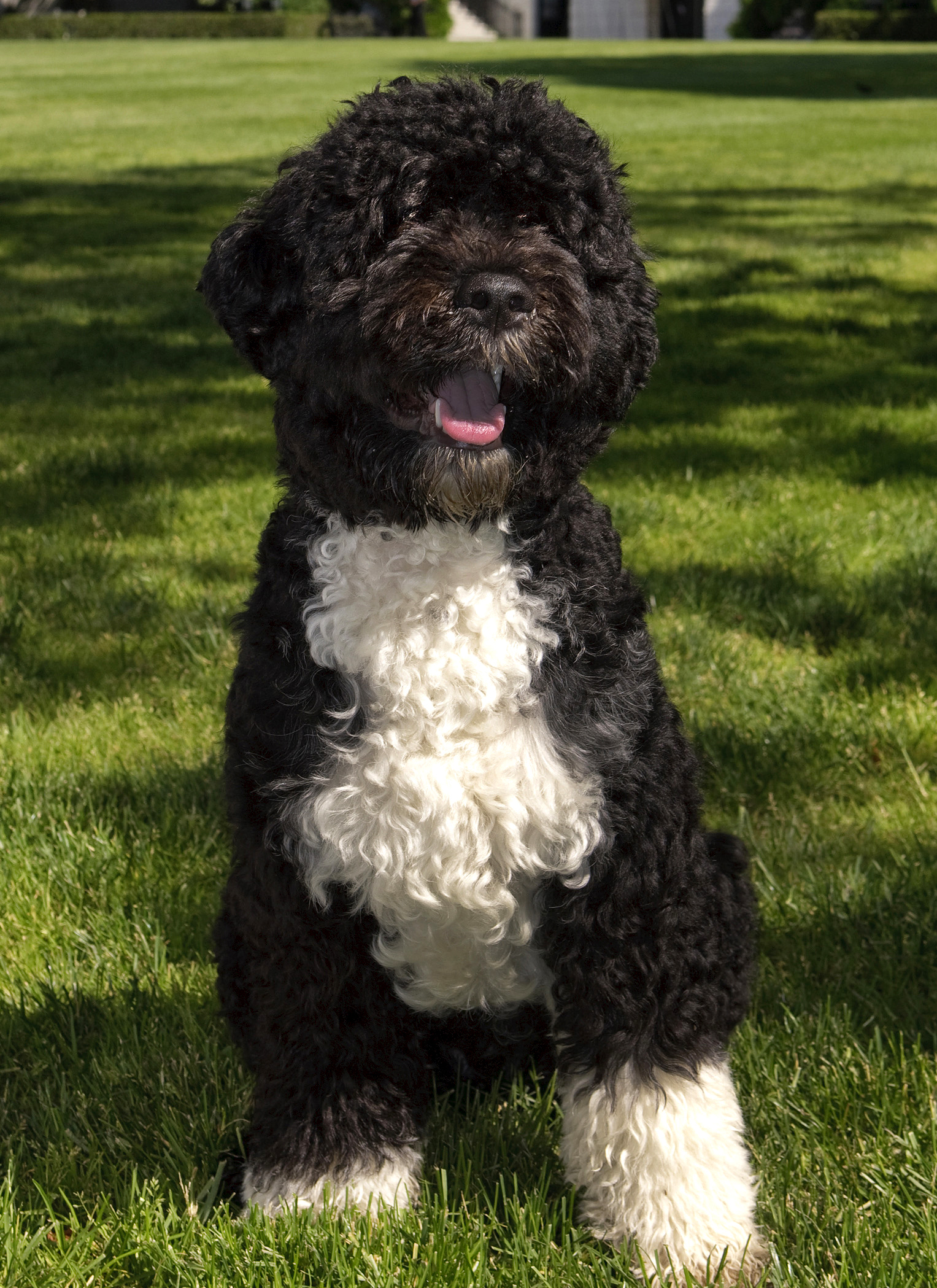
- Official White House portrait of the First Dog, 2009
- Other names: First Dog of the United States; Charlie (by previous owner)
- Species: Canis familiaris
- Breed: Portuguese Water Dog
- Sex: Male
- Born: Amigo's New Hope; October 9, 2008; Chicago, Illinois, U.S.
- Died: May 8, 2021 (aged 12); Washington, D.C., U.S.
- Cause of death: Cancer
- Known for: Pet of the Obama family
- Tricks: Dawn Sylvia (Hume, Virginia); Can sit, present paw/shake, lie down, roll over, get off, wait
- Title: First Dog of the United States
- Term: April 14, 2009 – January 20, 2017
- Predecessor: Barney and Miss Beazley
- Successor: Champ and Major
- Owner: Obama family
- Parents: Dam: Penny (US CH Amigo's Phor What Its Worth) (Boyd, Texas); Sire: Watson (US CH Valkyrie's Dr. Watson Is Here) (Ambridge, Pennsylvania); Breeder: Julie Parker
- Appearance: Tuxedo/black and white
- Named after: Obama girls' cousins' pet cat and Bo Diddley

Bo (October 9, 2008 – May 8, 2021) was a pet dog of the Obama family, the first family of the United States from 2009 until 2017. President Barack Obama and his family were given the male Portuguese Water Dog as a gift after months of speculation about the breed and identity of their future pet. The final choice was made in part because elder daughter Malia's allergies dictated a need for a hypoallergenic breed. Bo was occasionally called "First Dog". In August 2013, Bo was joined by Sunny, a female dog of the same breed.

Bo was named by sisters Malia and Sasha after their cousins' cat, First Lady Michelle Obama's father, also as a reference to the R&B musician Bo Diddley; who had died months before the puppy was born and months before Obama's victory at the 2008 presidential election. Bo's name was also Barack Obama's initials, widely reported as the reason for the dog's name.

== Breed background ==
The Portuguese Water Dog is originally from the Algarve region of Portugal. Only 48 Portuguese Water Dogs were entered for Britain's Crufts competition in 2009 and the author of The New Complete Portuguese Water Dog, Kitty Braund, believes there are about 50,000 in North America. Due to its fleecy coat of minimally shedding hair, the Portuguese Water Dog is considered a hypoallergenic dog breed.

== Breeding and original owners ==
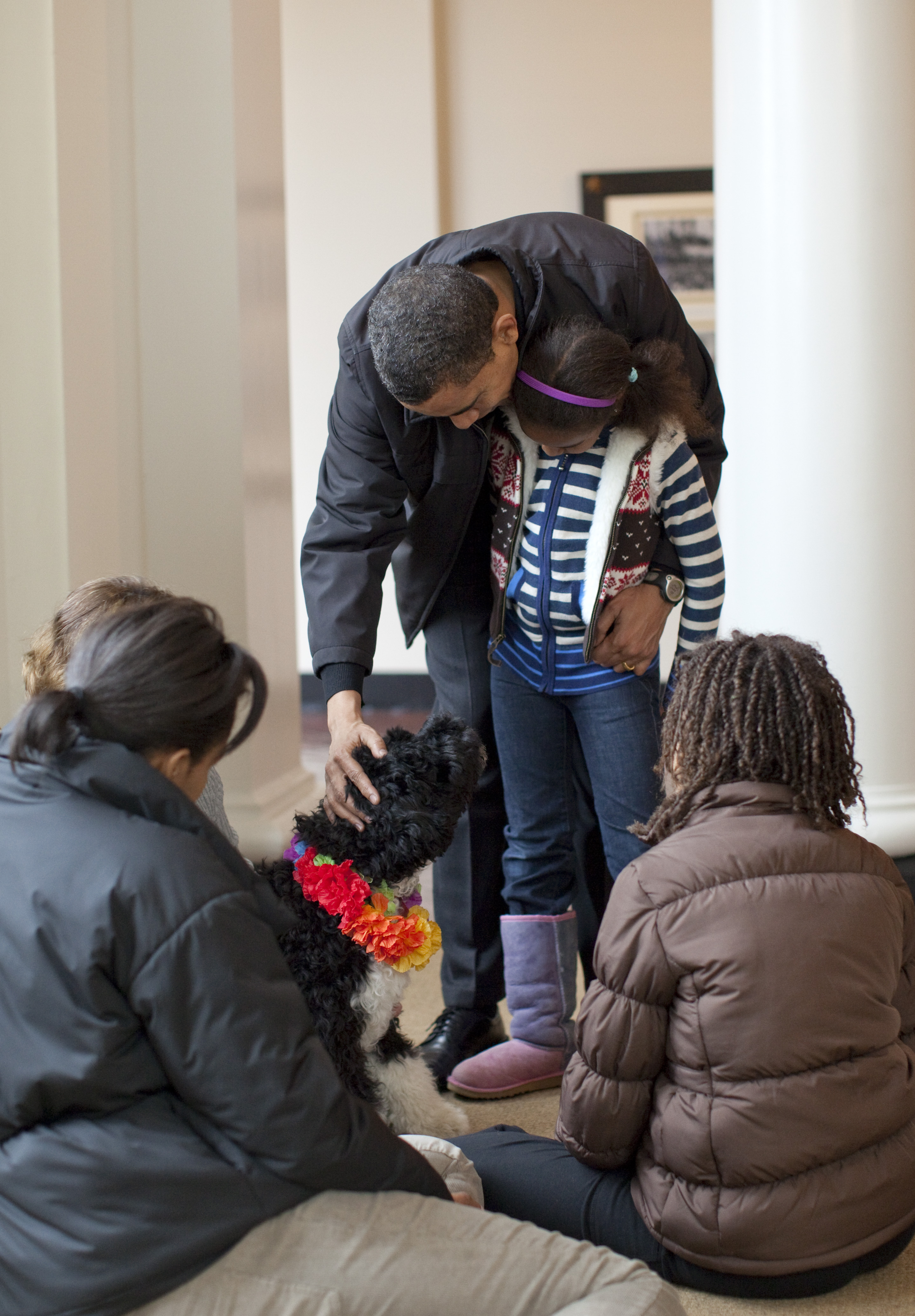
The Obamas with Bo

Bred by Martha and Art Stern of Amigo Portuguese Water Dogs in Boyd, Texas, Bo was a son of Watson—of the Rader family in Pittsburgh's Ambridge suburb—and Penny, belonging to Art and Martha Stern. One of Bo's nine litter mates was Senator Ted Kennedy's dog named Cappy (Amigo's Captain Courageous). The litter was named "Hope and Change", in honor of Obama's victory.

Bo's original buyer is unknown, but eventually, they returned him to the Stern family. Purchasing Bo required signing a contract to return him to his breeder if things did not work out. Bo enrolled with Kennedy's obedience trainer Dawn Sylvia-Stasiewicz in Hume, Virginia, on January 5, 2009.

== Selection of the dog ==
At his first press conference as President-elect, Obama was questioned by reporters as to which breed the family was looking to acquire. He replied, "We have two criteria that have to be reconciled. One is that Malia is allergic, so it has to be hypoallergenic. There are a number of breeds that are hypoallergenic. On the other hand, our preference would be to get a shelter dog, but, obviously, a lot of shelter dogs are mutts like me. So—so whether we're going to be able to balance those two things, I think, is a pressing issue on the Obama household."

George Stephanopoulos asked Obama on television in early January what kind of dog they would get, and when, saying that he was passing on a question from Obama's daughters who were sitting in the control room. Obama said "They seem to have narrowed it down to a labradoodle or a Portuguese water hound ... medium-sized dog, and so, we're now going to start looking at shelters to see when one of those dogs might come up."

Much was made by the public and press about the family's search for a dog. On April 12, 2009, it was announced that the Obamas would soon accept a six-month-old Portuguese Water Dog puppy as a gift from Senator Kennedy. The dog was reported to have visited the family some weeks earlier in a secret meeting to gauge compatibility and purportedly referred to by staffers as "The Meeting". However, the gift was not accepted until the dog officially arrived and moved in at the White House on Tuesday, April 14, 2009.

Immediately after he arrived, the family staged a photo op with Bo on the property's South Lawn. At the conference, Obama was asked if he would allow Bo inside the Oval Office, to which he responded: "of course." He also gave a nod to President Harry Truman's quote "If you want a friend in Washington, get a dog." The White House website was later updated to include official pictures and biographical details of Bo.

== Biographical details ==
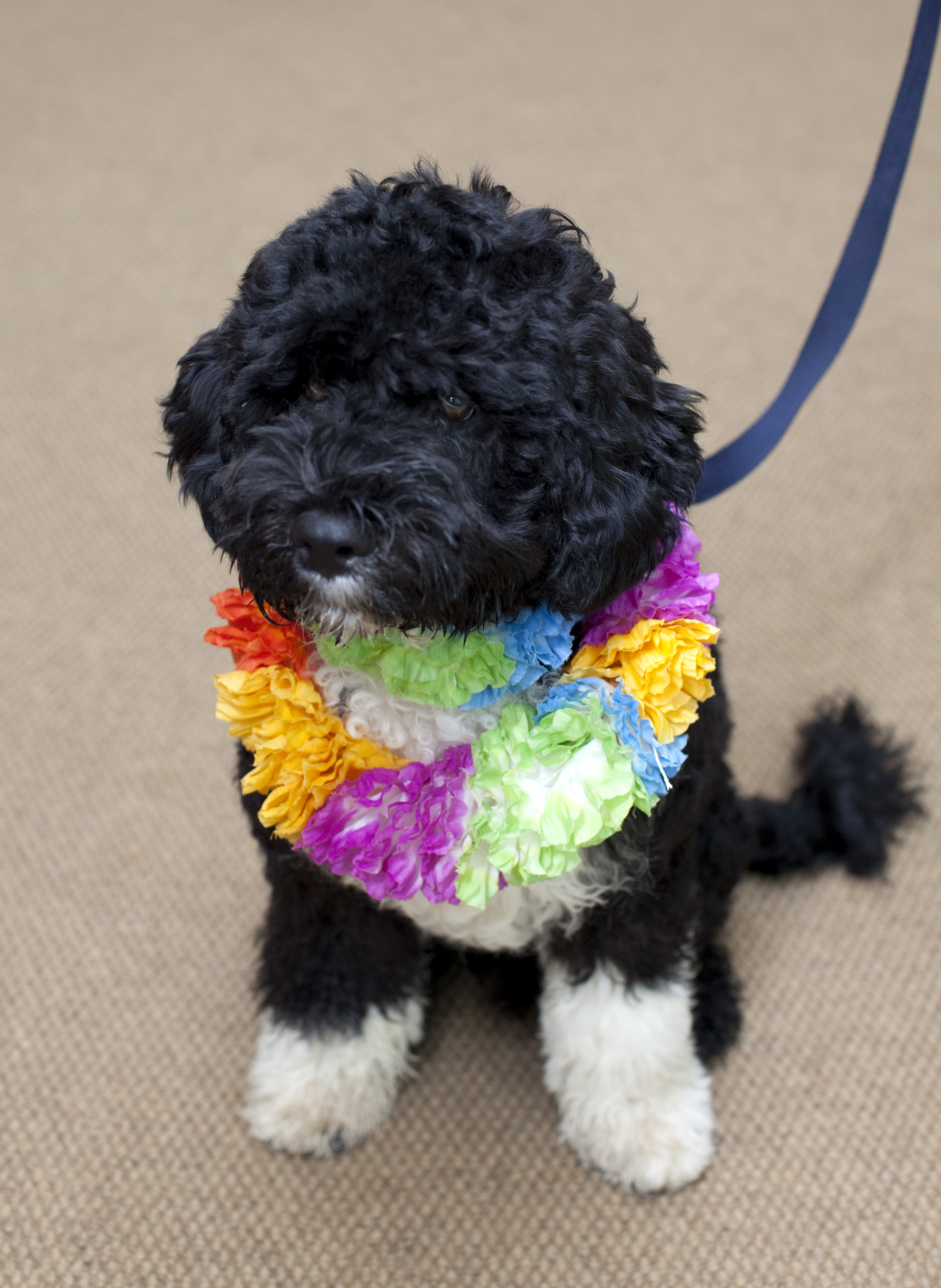
Bo wearing a lei upon his White House arrival

Listed by the name "Amigo's New Hope" with American Kennel Club's breed registry and given the name "Charlie" by his original owners, the puppy received his name from President Obama's two daughters, Malia and Sasha, in part after their cousins' cat and Michelle Obama's father's nickname Diddley; the dog is named for singer Bo Diddley.

In June 2009, the White House released a baseball card for Bo with his new official portrait on one side and tongue-in-cheek statistics on the other. Information included the facts that Bo's favorite food is tomatoes and that he does not yet know how to swim. The card was available by sending a self-addressed, stamped envelope to the White House.

According to financial disclosure forms released by President Obama in 2010, Bo was purchased for $1,600, equivalent to $2,360 in 2025.

It was announced in August 2012 that Bo was on a diet, though no other details were released. It was announced by the President during the Kids' State Dinner, where children from the states and territories who had won a contest to design healthy, appealing meals had lunch at the White House.

== Bo's heritage ==
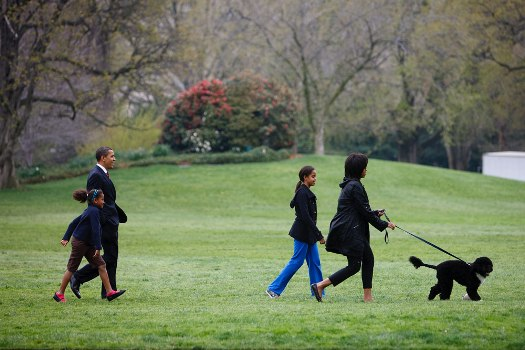
The Obamas walking with Bo

The Obamas had voiced a strong desire to adopt a shelter dog but made no firm commitments. In Summer 2008, Best Friends Animal Society, an animal welfare organization, gathered 50,000 signatures on a petition asking the family to adopt a shelter animal.

Although Bo was a gift through a breeder, dog expert César Millán stated Bo could be considered part of a larger group known as "rescue dogs". He was unsuccessful in his first home when plans for him to provide companionship to an older female dog went awry; apparently, his attempts to suckle irritated her. The Obamas pledged a donation to the DC Humane Society in a show of support for shelter dogs.

The Humane Society of the United States released a statement thanking the Obamas "for taking in a second-chance dog" but discouraged employing breeders.

== Reactions in the media ==
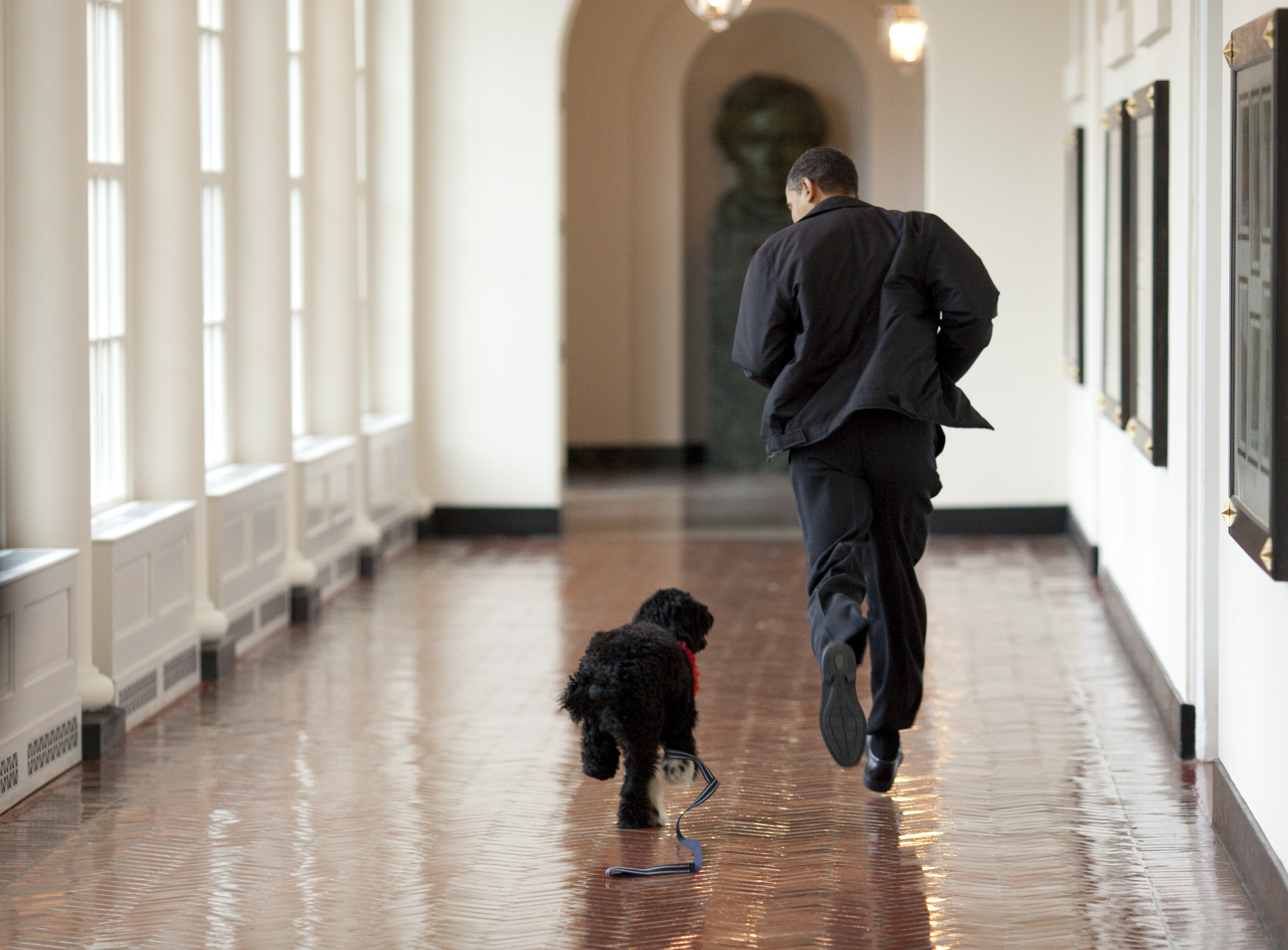
Bo and Obama running through the east wing of the White House

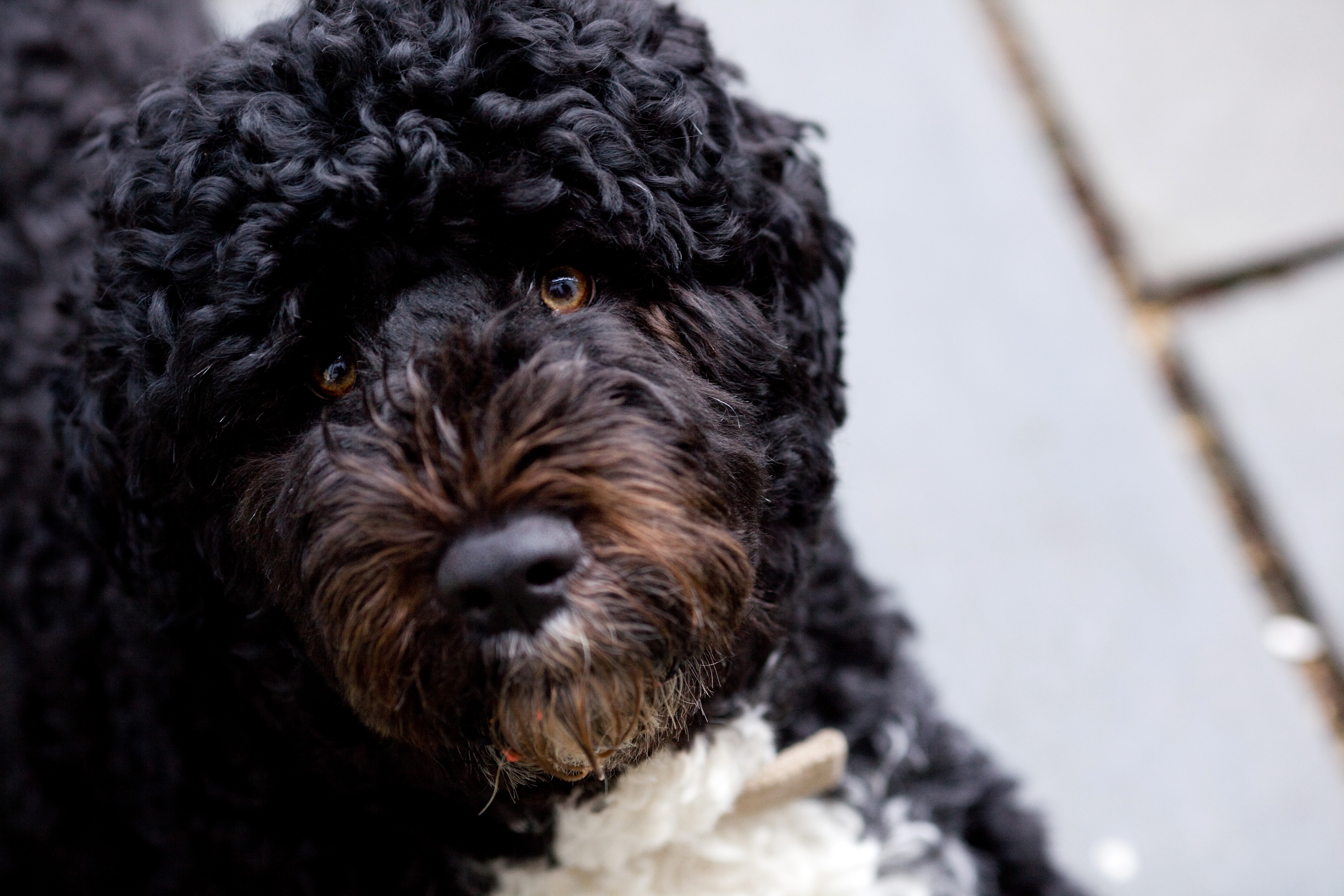
Bo in March 2010

The Washington Post's Manuel Roig-Franzia, granted exclusive access to Bo for his debut in print, described the puppy: "Bo's a handsome little guy. Well suited for formal occasions at the White House, he's got tuxedo-black fur, with a white chest, white paws and a rakish white goatee."

People for the Ethical Treatment of Animals (PETA) described the family's choice to accept the gift of a puppy from a family friend as "disquieting" and publicly urged Obama to have Bo neutered, despite the dog having been neutered before the Obamas received him.

In anticipation of increased interest in the breed, the Portuguese Water Dog Club of America issued a statement requesting that members of the public considering obtaining the dogs "ensure that this breed fits their lifestyle", advising that the dogs' needs preclude their being left alone for long periods or boarded in kennels.

Immediately upon Bo joining the First Family, four children's books and a plush toy depicting him were slated for publication or manufacture.

On July 17, 2009, Ben Greenman, writing in The New York Times as Bo, reflected on his first hundred days in office.

In the final episode of the History Channel's Life After People, aired March 16, 2010, the producers imagined what life would be like for Bo after the disappearance of humanity. This program speculated that he would leave the White House and live off seafood from the Chesapeake Bay.

Bo was also shown on Dogs 101, as part of segment about the breed.

Bo appeared in the comic book Lockjaw and the Pet Avengers and on the television shows Late Night with Seth Meyers and Ellen. On Meyers' show, Bo was the subject of a "Barney Cam" parody in which he is shown to be shamelessly manipulating White House staffers and guests (such as by finding and planting cannabis in the bag of a speechwriter who refused to give him treats).

Bo acquired the nickname "Bobama".

== Dognapping plot ==
On January 8, 2016, a man named Scott Stockert from Dickinson, North Dakota, was arrested for allegedly trying to kidnap Bo after United States Secret Service Agents discovered a 12 gauge pump action shotgun and a bolt action .22 caliber rifle on the back of his pickup truck.

== Death ==
On May 8, 2021, the Obama family confirmed that Bo had died of cancer in Washington, D.C., at the age of 12.

== See also ==
- United States presidential pets
- List of individual dogs

Honorary titles
| Preceded by Barney, Miss Beazley and Spot "Spotty" Fetcher; George W. Bush's dogs | White House pet dog April 14, 2009 – January 20, 2017; Served alongside: Sunny (since August 19, 2013) | Succeeded by Champ and Major, Joe Biden's German Shepherds (January 20, 2021) |
