= Miss Beazley =

Scottish Terrier owned by US presidential Bush family

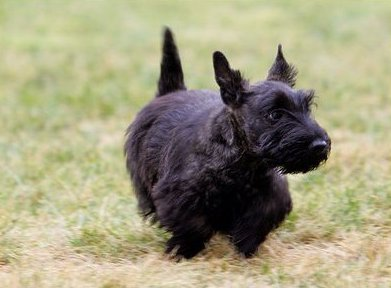
- Miss Beazley on January 6, 2005
- Species: Dog
- Breed: Purebred Scottish Terrier
- Sex: Female
- Born: October 28, 2004
- Died: May 17, 2014 (aged 9); Texas, U.S.
- Cause of death: Lymphoma
- Nationality: United States
- Known for: Pet of the First Family of the United States
- Owners: George W. Bush; Laura Bush
- Parents: Blackwatch Elizabeth (dam); Clinton (sire)

Miss Beazley Bush (October 28, 2004 – May 17, 2014) was a Scottish Terrier which belonged to former U.S. President George W. Bush and former U.S. First Lady Laura Bush.

Miss Beazley's father, a Scottish terrier named Clinton, was born on November 7, 2000. Clinton was the half-brother of the Bushes' first Scottish terrier, Barney. Miss Beazley's mother, Blackwatch Elizabeth, was bred by dog breeder Patricia Gilmore of Livingston, New Jersey. Gilmore also bred Miss Beazley, a purebred Scottish terrier who was born in 2004.

Miss Beazley was adopted as a birthday present from President Bush to First Lady Laura Bush. She moved into the White House as a ten-week-old puppy on January 6, 2005, shortly before the beginning of President Bush's second term in office. The First Lady and her daughters Barbara and Jenna Bush named their new dog after a character from Oliver Butterworth's 1956 children's book, The Enormous Egg.

Miss Beazley and the Bushes' first Scottish Terrier, Barney, became well known United States presidential pets. In 2005, Miss Beazley and Barney were featured in the White House Christmas video, A Very Beazley Christmas, for her first holiday in the White House.

Miss Beazley continued to live in Texas with the former presidential family until her death on May 17, 2014, from lymphoma.

Barney and Miss Beazley are honored with a bronze sculpture at the George W. Bush Presidential Center.

== See also ==
- List of individual dogs

Honorary titles
Preceded by Barney (as sole presidential dog)	White House pet dog January 6, 2005–January 20, 2009; Served alongside: Barney	Succeeded by Bo; Barack Obama's; Portuguese Water Dog
