= Pete (Theodore Roosevelt's dog) =

American presidential pet

- Species: Canis familiaris
- Breed: Bull Terrier (conflicting reports)
- Sex: Male
- Died: October 1910; Likely the Roosevelt's Sagamore Hill (unconfirmed)
- Nationality: American
- Occupation: Presidential pet
- Owners: Theodore Roosevelt and his family

Pete was a pet dog belonging to United States president Theodore Roosevelt. He was one of many presidential pets during Roosevelt's presidency. He was reported to be a Bull Terrier, though other reports have said he was a Boston Bull Terrier or bulldog.

Pete was reported to be Theodore Roosevelt's favorite of his dogs.

Pete chased and bit a number of people on numerous occasions during his time living at the White House. He bit policemen on a number of occasions. In a biting incident, Pete tore the trousers of Secretary of the Interior James Rudolph Garfield. In another incident, Pete was reported to have chased George B. Cortelyou, causing Cortelyou to seek refuge by climbing a tree. He was also reported to have numerous times chased private citizens visiting the White House. In yet another incident, Pete tore the pants off of Jean Jules Jusserand (ambassador of France to the United States).

In May 1907, Pete got into repeated fights with another dog that would wander onto the White House grounds. These fights left him with serious, even life-threatening, injuries.

Pete would be exiled from living at the White House due to his aggressive incidents towards people. He was initially exiled in July 1907, reportedly because Theodore Roosevelt decided not to euthanize the dog following a plea from his son Archibald. He was again exiled in 1908, after he chased a State Department official. He appears to have spent the rest of his days at the Roosevelt's Sagamore Hill estate.

Pete died in October 1910.

== See also ==
- List of individual dogs
- United States presidential pets
