= Outline of American politics =

Overview of politics in the U.S.

The following outline is provided as an overview of and topical guide to American politics:

American politics – The politics of the United States.

== Features of American politics ==
=== Branches of government ===
- Legislative Branch
  - List of United States Congresses
- Executive Branch
- Judicial Branch

=== Levels of government ===
- National government
- State governments
- Local governments

=== Elections ===
- Contested elections in American history
- Electoral College
- First-past-the-post voting
- Gerrymandering
- Nonpartisan blanket primary
- Ranked-choice voting
- Runoff voting
- Suffrage

== History of American politics ==
- History of the United States Congress

=== Party systems ===
- First Party System
- Second Party System
- Third Party System
- Fourth Party System
- Fifth Party System
- Sixth Party System

=== Notable events ===
- Impeachment of Andrew Johnson
- Direct election of Senators
- Watergate scandal
- Republican Revolution of '94
- Impeachment of Bill Clinton

== American politics organizations ==
=== Political parties ===
List of political parties in the United States

The two major national parties are:

- Democratic Party
  - History of the Democratic Party
  - Democrat in name only
- Republican Party
  - History of the Republican Party
  - Republican in name only

== Documents central to American politics ==
- United States Declaration of Independence
- United States Constitution
- The Federalist Papers
- United States Bill of Rights

== Presidency ==
- Acting President of the United States
- Executive Office of the President of the United States
  - History
- List of presidents of the United States
- Natural-born-citizen clause (United States)
- Powers of the president of the United States
- Presidential immunity in the United States
- United States presidential election
- United States presidential line of succession
- United States presidential pets
  - Nanny and Nanko

=== Joe Biden ===
- American Rescue Plan Act of 2021
- CHIPS and Science Act
- Infrastructure Investment and Jobs Act
- Withdrawal of Joe Biden from the 2024 United States presidential election

=== Donald Trump ===
- Presidential campaigns
  - 1988 campaign
  - 2000 campaign
  - 2012 campaign
  - 2016 campaign
  - 2020 campaign
  - 2024 campaign
- Attempts to overturn the 2020 United States presidential election
- Donald Trump Supreme Court candidates
- First Step Act
- Great American Outdoors Act
- Post-election lawsuits related to the 2020 U.S. presidential election
- Tax Cuts and Jobs Act
- Trump administration family separation policy
- January 6 United States Capitol attack
  - Pardon of January 6 United States Capitol attack defendants
- 2025 United States trade war with Canada and Mexico
- Liberation Day tariffs
- Rhetoric of Donald Trump
- E. Jean Carroll v. Donald J. Trump
- Executive Order 13769
- CARES Act
- New York business fraud lawsuit against the Trump Organization
- The Trump Organization
- Impeachment of Donald Trump
  - Efforts to impeach Donald Trump
  - List of impeachment resolutions introduced against Donald Trump
  - Proposed expungements of the impeachments of Donald Trump
  - First impeachment of Donald Trump
    - First impeachment trial of Donald Trump
    - Impeachment inquiry against Donald Trump
  - Second impeachment of Donald Trump
    - Second impeachment trial of Donald Trump
- Donald Trump Supreme Court candidates
- Trump v. Anderson
- Trumpism
- List of people granted executive clemency by Donald Trump
- Donald Trump sexual misconduct allegations
- List of awards and honors received by Donald Trump
- Stormy Daniels–Donald Trump scandal
- Pseudonyms used by Donald Trump
- Operation Southern Spear
  - Operation Absolute Resolve
    - Nicolás Maduro
- Relationship of Donald Trump and Jeffrey Epstein
- Personal and business legal affairs of Donald Trump

==== By time ====
- Timeline of the Donald Trump presidencies
- First presidency of Donald Trump
  - First cabinet of Donald Trump
    - Mike Pence
    - Rex Tillerson
    - Mike Pompeo
  - Immigration policy of the first Donald Trump administration
  - First inauguration of Donald Trump
  - Legal affairs of the first Donald Trump presidency
  - Tariffs in the first Trump administration
- Second presidency of Donald Trump
  - Second cabinet of Donald Trump
    - JD Vance
    - Marco Rubio
  - Immigration policy of the second Donald Trump administration
  - Second inauguration of Donald Trump
  - Legal affairs of the second Donald Trump presidency
  - Tariffs in the second Trump administration

== Persons influential in American politics ==
- Category:Lists of American politicians
- Alexandria Ocasio-Cortez
- Barack Obama
  - Presidency of Barack Obama
  - Conspiracy theories
    - Barack Obama citizenship conspiracy theories
    - Barack Obama religion conspiracy theories
- Zohran Mamdani
- Founding Fathers of the United States

== See also ==
- 2021 United States Capitol car attack
- Deep state conspiracy theory in the United States
- Democratic backsliding in the United States
- First hundred days (United States)
  - First 100 days of Franklin D. Roosevelt's presidency
  - First 100 days of Barack Obama's presidency
  - First 100 days of Donald Trump's first presidency
  - First 100 days of Joe Biden's presidency
  - First 100 days of Donald Trump's second presidency
- Left–right political spectrum
- Party switching in the United States
  - List of party switchers in the United States
- Slavery in the United States
- War on terror

=== Political positions ===
- Vice President of the United States
  - List of vice presidents of the United States
  - Natural-born-citizen clause (United States)
- Speaker of the United States House of Representatives
  - List of speakers of the United States House of Representatives
- Chief Justice of the United States
  - List of chief justices
