= Rebecca (raccoon) =

Presidential pet raccoon

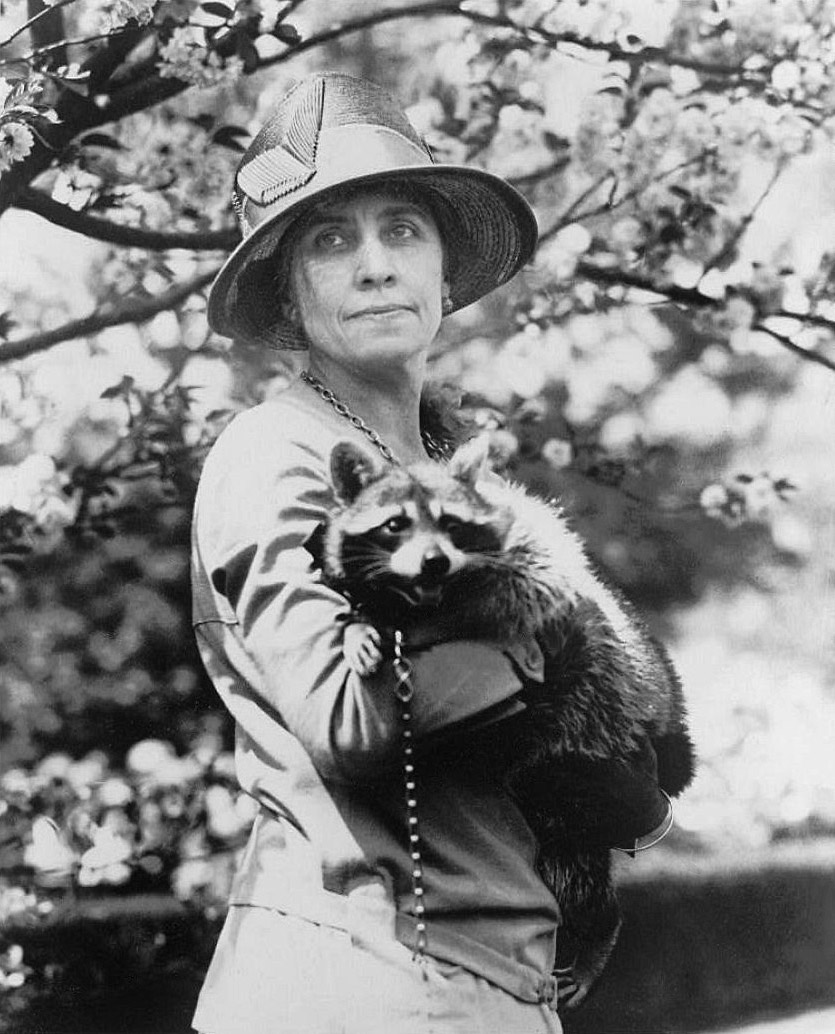
- First Lady Grace Coolidge holding Rebecca
- Species: Raccoon
- Sex: Female
- Born: Mississippi, U.S.
- Died: c. 1929; Washington D.C., U.S.
- Title: White House Raccoon
- Owners: Calvin Coolidge; Grace Coolidge
- Residence: White House (1926-1929); Rock Creek Park (1929; until death)
- Mate: Rueben (attempted)

Rebecca was a raccoon kept as a pet by US president Calvin Coolidge and First Lady Grace Coolidge. She lived in the White House from 1926 to 1929.

== Life ==
Rebecca was born in Mississippi. She had been sent to the White House to be served for the 1926 Thanksgiving dinner. Since the 1913 death of Horace Vose, the traditional provider of the White House Thanksgiving turkey, numerous farmers sent animals for Thanksgiving dinner. In 1926, a Mississippi supporter sent Rebecca. Coolidge, who had never eaten raccoon and had no appetite to try it, kept Rebecca as a pet instead.

For Christmas, an embroidered collar was made for Rebecca, inscribed with the title "White House Raccoon". She enjoyed participating in the annual White House Easter egg roll. She was fed shrimp and persimmons, and eggs were a favorite. Rebecca was let loose in the White House and walked on a leash outdoors. At times, she could be mischievous and was known to unscrew lightbulbs, open cabinets, and unpot houseplants. She was known to nestle in Coolidge's lap when he sat by the fireplace.

As First Lady Grace wrote:

We had a house made for her in one of the large trees, with a wire fence built around it for protection. We kept her chained when out of doors, but in the house she had her liberty. She was a mischievous, inquisitive party and we had to keep watch of her when she was in the house. She enjoyed nothing better than being placed in a bathtub with a little water in it and given a cake of soap with which to play. In this fashion she would amuse herself for an hour or more.

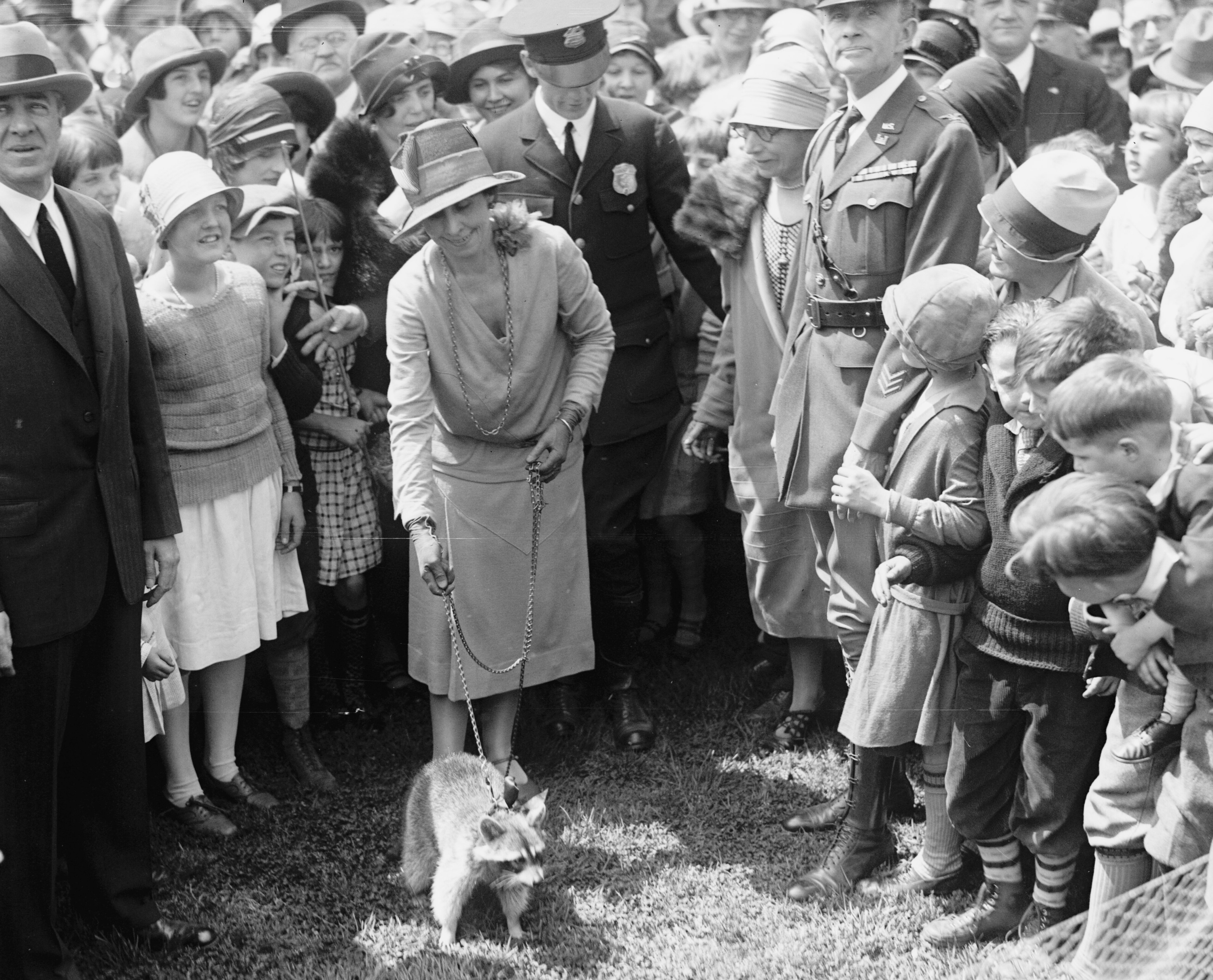
Mrs. Coolidge and Rebecca, at the White House Easter egg roll, 1927

As a companion for Rebecca, Rueben, a male raccoon, was acquired by a White House police officer. However, Rebecca and Rueben did not get along. Rueben frequently escaped, being recovered by White House staff; one such instance created a traffic jam. He ultimately disappeared without a trace. Grace Coolidge wrote about the incident:

Rebecca had lived alone and had her own way so long that I fear she was a little overbearing and dictatorial, perhaps reminding her spouse that he was living on her bounty. [Afterward, Rebecca] continued to live in single blessedness.

In March 1927, during a White House renovation, Coolidge brought Rebecca to his temporary quarters in a Dupont Circle mansion. When the Coolidges took a vacation in the Black Hills, they brought Rebecca along in a basket, together with two of their dogs, Rob Roy and Prudence Prim as well as five canaries on the 1,800-mile railroad journey. In preparation for leaving the White House at the end of the president's term in 1929, the Coolidges donated Rebecca to the zoological quarters in Rock Creek Park (now the National Zoo) in Washington, DC. Rebecca died shortly after.

Herbert Hoover was next to occupy the White House; soon thereafter, a wild opossum moved into Rebecca's vacant tree-house and was adopted by the Hoovers and was named Billy Possum.

== See also ==
- United States presidential pets
- National Thanksgiving Turkey Presentation
