= Dick the Mockingbird =

Pet bird of Thomas Jefferson

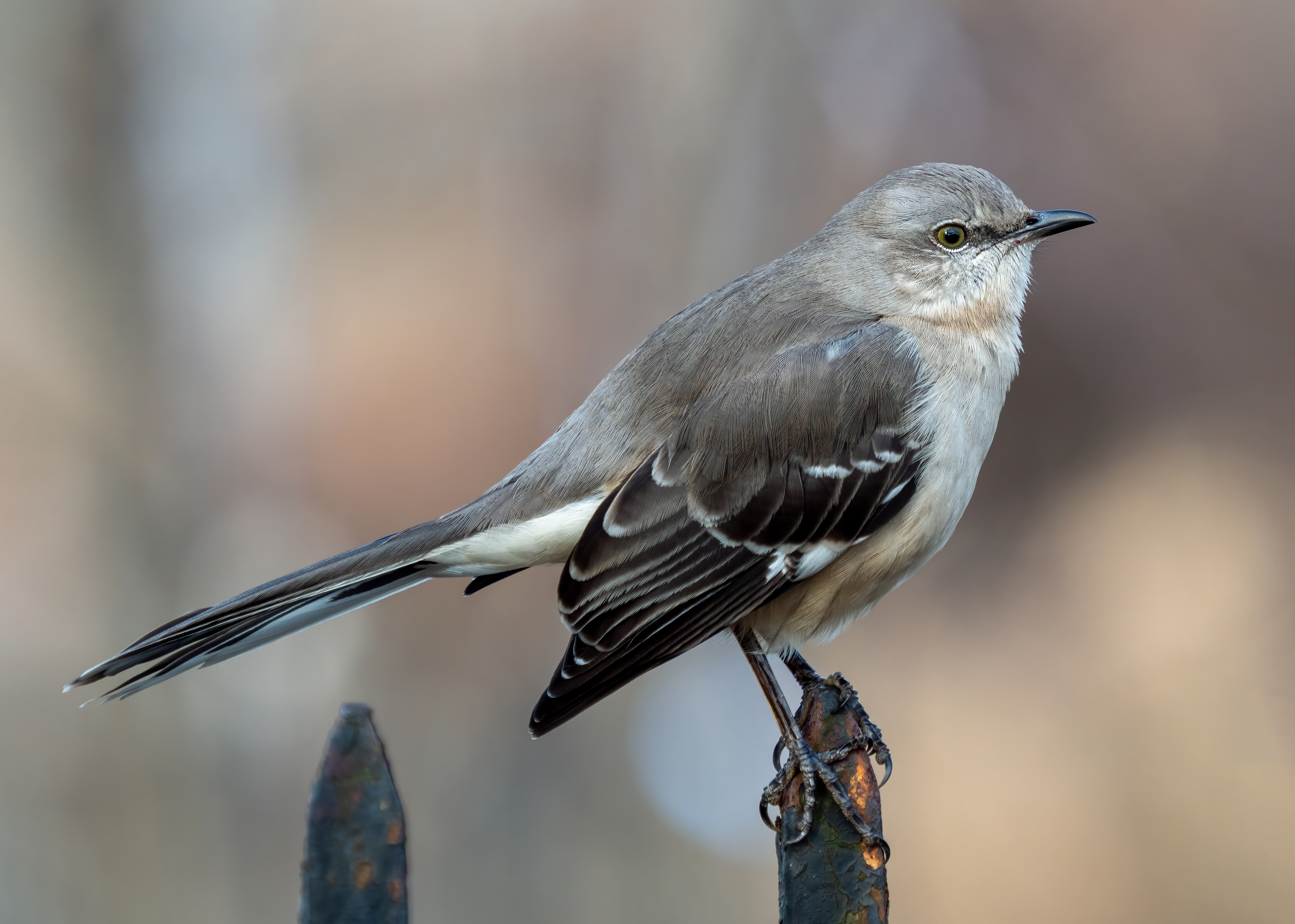
Northern mockingbird (Mimus polyglottos), native to Jefferson's home state of Virginia and the likely species of Dick the Mockingbird

Dick the Mockingbird was one of U.S. president Thomas Jefferson's pet mockingbirds. Although there had been previous presidential pets, Jefferson is thought to be "the first president to have a pet [that lived] in the White House." Prior to his term as President, Jefferson bought his first mockingbird in November 1772 from a slave of his father-in-law John Wayles for five shillings. Birds were Jefferson's favorite animal and Dick was the favorite from among at least four mockingbirds the president had while in office. During his time in the White House, Jefferson wrote observations on the types of birds that he spotted in the area. In May 1793, in response to a letter from his son-in-law Thomas Mann Randolph, Jefferson wrote: "I sincerely congratulate you on the arrival of the mockingbird. Teach all the children to venerate it as a superior being which will haunt them if any harm is done to itself or its eggs."

== As a pet ==
Jefferson was known to keep Dick's cage in a special area of his study, on a windowsill surrounded by plants. He often left the cage open, allowing the mockingbird free range of the room. Dick would perch on Jefferson's couch and sing him to sleep after following him step by step up the stairs. The bird enjoyed sitting on Jefferson's shoulder while he worked at his desk. Jefferson had even trained Dick to swoop down and take food from between his lips. When Jefferson played his violin, Dick would join in, "pouring out his song along with the violin," creating a duet.

As an acquaintance wrote: "How he loved the bird! He could not live without something to love… his bird and his flowers became the objects of his tender care."

== See also ==
- United States presidential pets
- List of individual birds
