= Irvin Williams =

America gardener (1926–2018)

Irvin Williams (March 18, 1926 – November 7, 2018) was an American gardener who was the longest serving White House head gardener, serving from 1962 to 2008. He was a key figure in the design of the White House Rose Garden.

== Career ==
What's great about the job is that our trees, our plants, our shrubs, know nothing about politics.

— Irvin Williams, "All the President's Stems", Florida Today

Williams began working as a government horticulturist during the Truman Administration and worked on a variety of projects, including many at the White House. He was made head gardener of the White House in 1962 and was almost immediately assigned to work on a redesign of the Rose Garden with Bunny Mellon, which had been requested by president John F. Kennedy. After Kennedy's assassination in 1963, Lady Bird Johnson directed them to continue the redesign, a process that was finished in 1965. During the redesign, Williams convinced the National Park Service to allow him to uproot magnolia trees from the Tidal Basin to be replanted in the Rose Garden, as Mellon believed they would complement the Jackson magnolia in the White House's south lawn. Williams described the tree as creating "an atmosphere" and "a structure of something living" outside the White House's living spaces.

In 1981 Nancy Reagan brought Bunny Mellon back to the White House to update her 1962 design, a process that again closely involved Williams. Under George H. W. Bush's administration Williams was instructed to use only non-lethal means to deter garden pests, including "fertilizer laced with Louisiana hot sauce" and peanuts "strapped to tree trunks" used to distract animals from freshly-planted flowers.

Williams retired from working at the White House in 2008 after 46 years as head gardener. Over the course of his career, he worked for nine presidents.

== Personal life ==
Williams was born in Engle, West Virginia, on March 18, 1926, to a farming family. He was married and had five children. After John F. Kennedy's assassination, his dog Pushinka was given to Williams by Jacqueline Kennedy. Williams died on November 7, 2018, in Reston, Virginia. While working at the White House, Williams began collecting items relating to his job and the White House. Much of his collection was sold in June 2022 at an estate sale, including eggs from the White House Easter Egg Roll signed by president Bill Clinton.
