= Pushinka =

Dog given to John F. Kennedy by Soviet Premier Nikita Khrushchev

Pushinka (Пушинка)
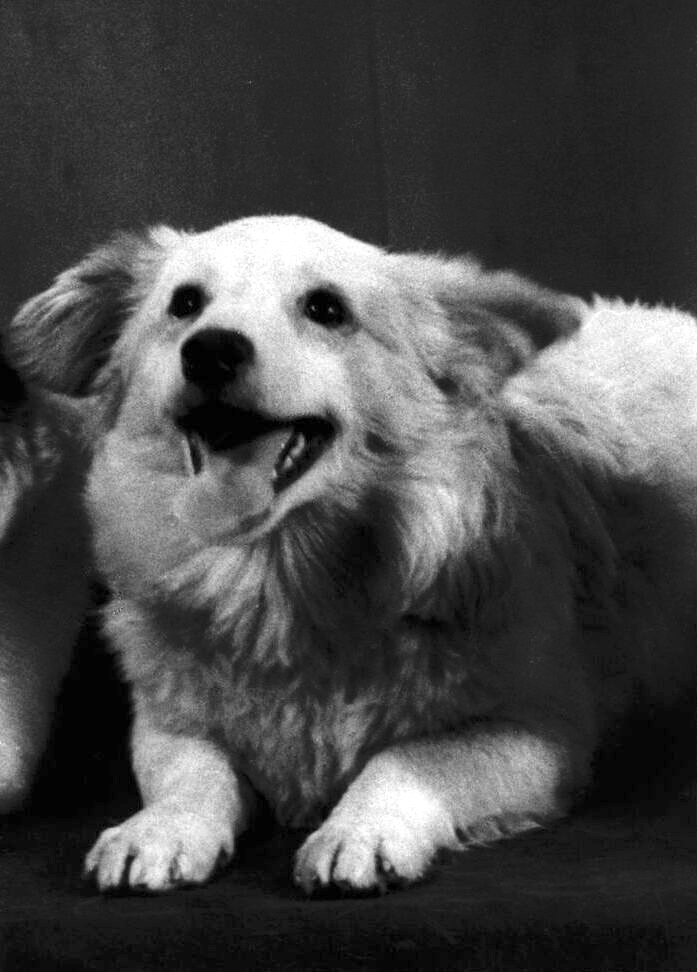
- Other name: "Fluff"
- Species: Canis familiaris
- Breed: Mixed
- Sex: Female
- Born: November 30, 1960
- Nationality: Soviet Union
- Owners: Jacqueline Kennedy Onassis; John F. Kennedy; Irvin Williams White House head gardener
- Parents: Strelka; Pushok
- Mate: Charlie
- Offspring: The pupniks; Butterfly; Streaker; White Tips; Blackie

Pushinka, (Note: Russian: Пушинка, lit. 'Fluffy') also known as Fluffy, was a dog given by the Soviet Premier Nikita Khrushchev to the President of the United States, John F. Kennedy, in 1961. Pushinka was the daughter of Strelka, who had travelled into space aboard Korabl-Sputnik 2.

Pushinka arrived at the Kennedy White House after Jacqueline Kennedy had spoken to Khrushchev about Strelka at a state dinner in Vienna. Mrs. Kennedy asked about Strelka's puppies, and one was subsequently sent by Khrushchev to the White House. Pushinka was examined by the Central Intelligence Agency at the Walter Reed Army Medical Center over fears that she might be concealing an implanted listening device. Pushinka was x-rayed, screened with a magnetometer, and inspected by sonogram. She was found to be free of subversive devices.

The White House electrician and kennel manager, Traphes Bryant, trained Pushinka with peanuts to climb up a ladder to Caroline Kennedy's playhouse and slide down the other side.

After John F. Kennedy's death, Jacqueline Kennedy gave Pushinka to White House Gardener Irvin Williams.

== Descendants ==
Pushinka became pregnant by one of the Kennedys' dogs, Charlie, and gave birth to four puppies, whom the president jokingly called pupniks. The White House received 5,000 requests from members of the public asking for Pushinka's puppies. Two of the puppies, Butterfly and Streaker, were given away to children in the Midwest. The other two puppies, White Tips and Blackie, stayed at the Kennedy home on Squaw Island and later were given away to family friends, one puppy to Patricia Kennedy and her husband, Peter Lawford. Pushinka subsequently became irascible, and "a little nippy" according to Caroline Kennedy, which she attributed to her upbringing in a scientific laboratory.

Descendants of Pushinka are living in 2024.

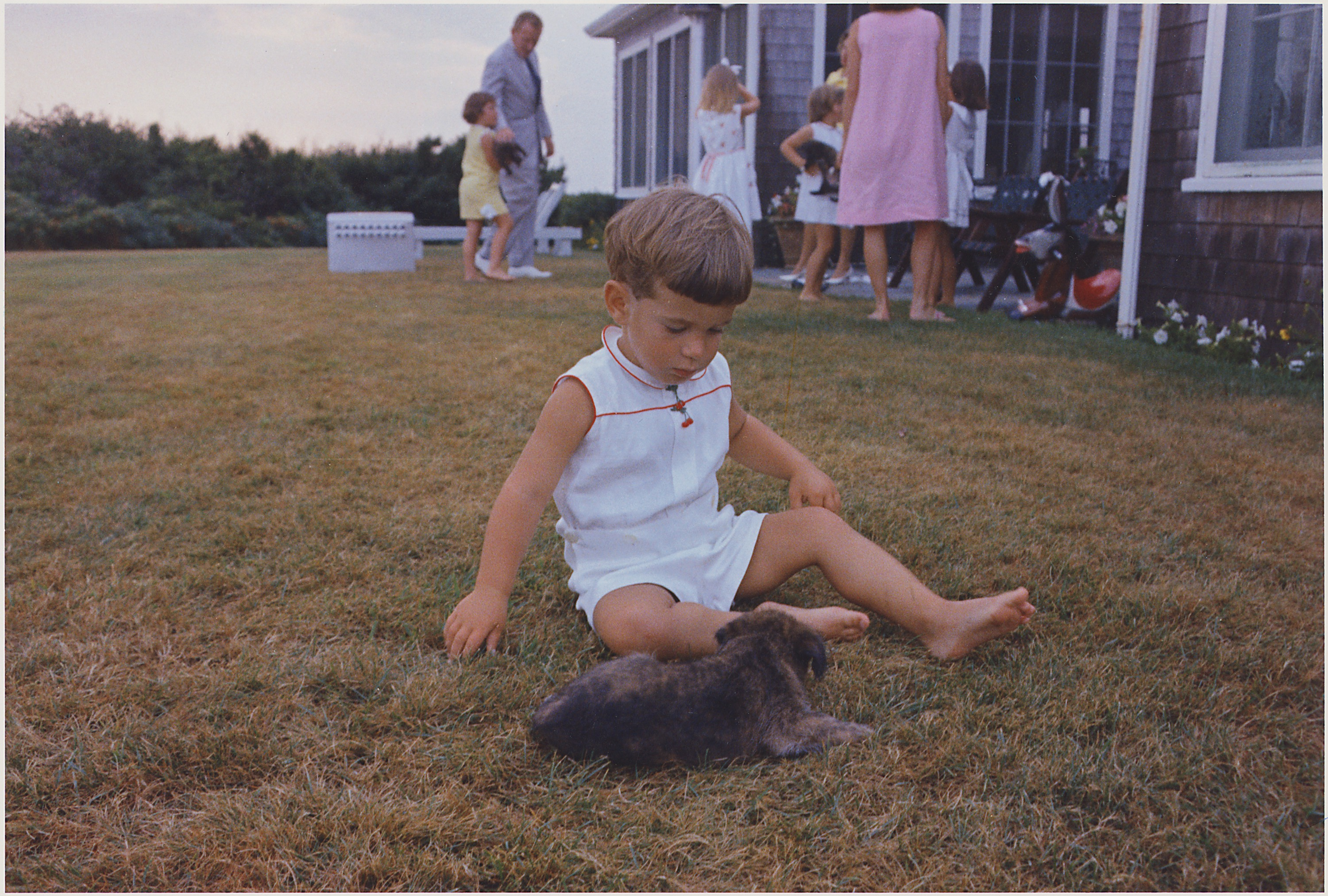
John F. Kennedy Jr. with one of Pushinka's puppies at Squaw Island, Hyannis Port, 14 August 1963

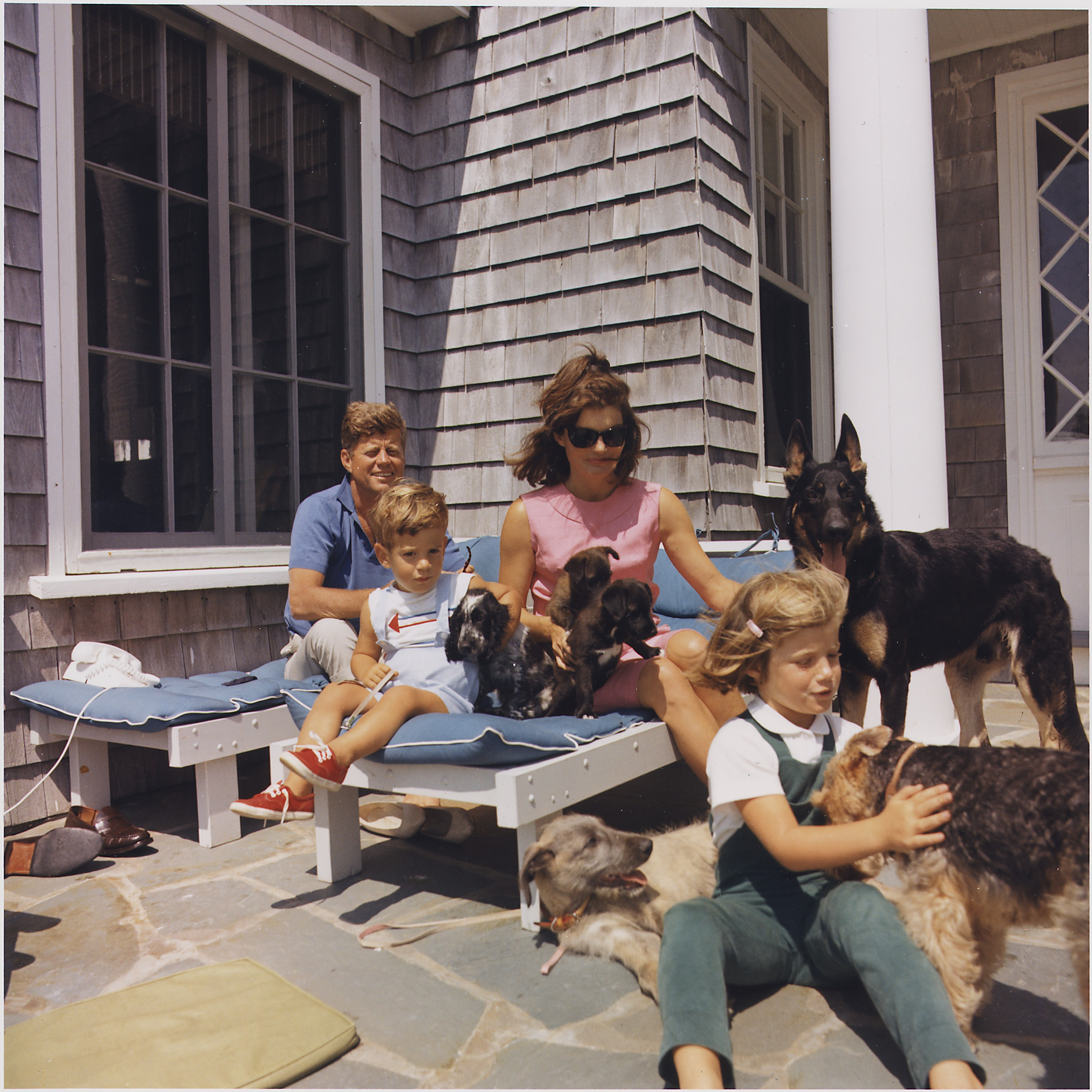
President John F. Kennedy, Jacqueline Kennedy, Caroline Kennedy and John F. Kennedy Jr. with two of Pushinka's puppies and their other family dogs, at Squaw Island, Hyannis Port, 14 August 1963

== See also ==
- List of individual dogs
- United States presidential pets
