= Yuki (dog) =

Dog owned by Lyndon B. Johnson

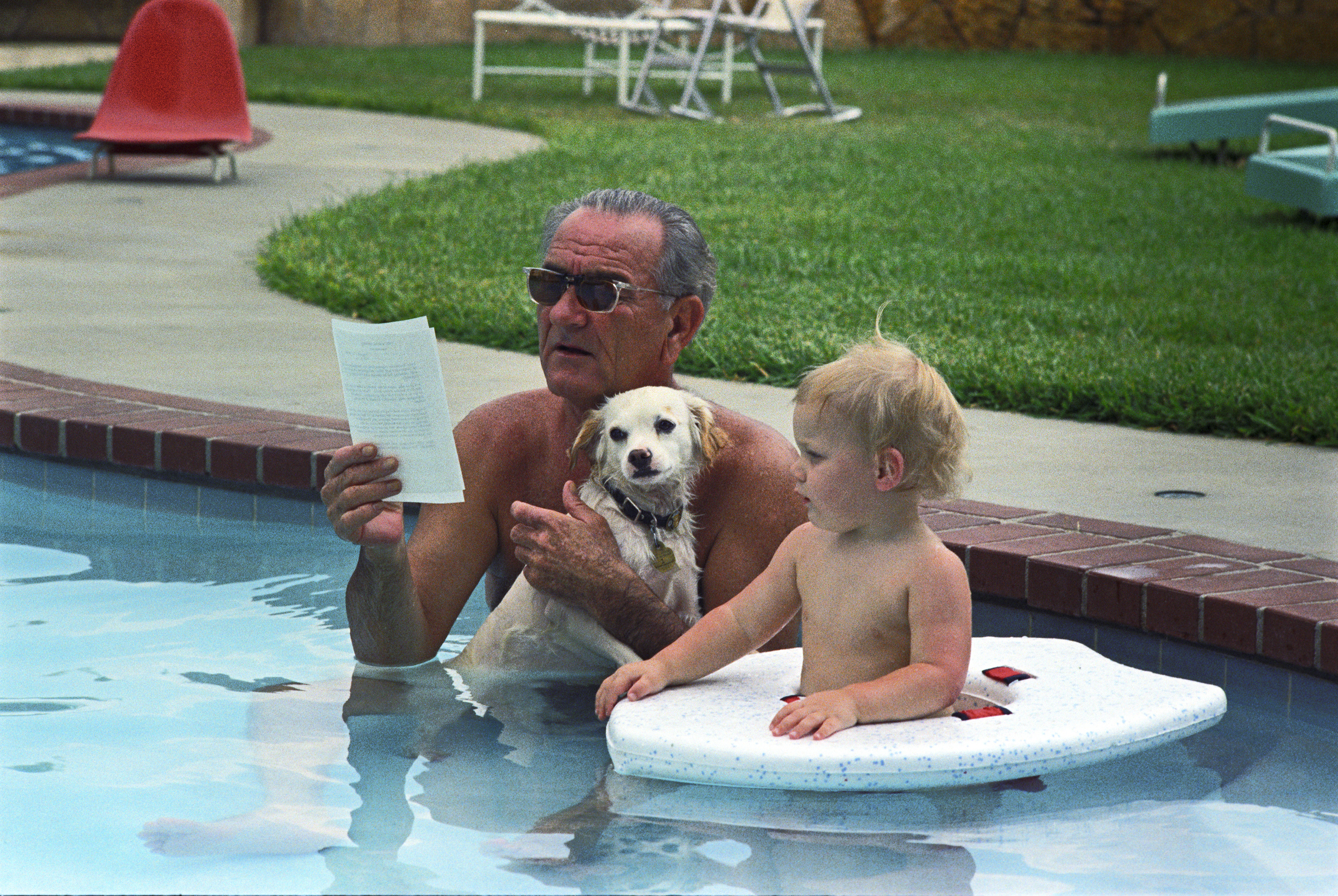
- Lyndon B. Johnson holding Yuki while reading a memo
- Species: Canis familiaris
- Breed: White mongrel
- Died: 1979
- Occupation: First dog of the United States
- Term: 1967–1969
- Owners: Luci Baines Johnson (1966–1967, 1973–1979); Lyndon B. Johnson (1967–1973)

Yuki was a white mongrel owned by US President Lyndon B. Johnson. Yuki was initially owned by Luci and Patrick Nugent, until being given to Johnson in 1967. Yuki was the first rescue dog to enter the White House. Yuki was at Johnson's side until Johnson's death, and then stayed with Nugent until he died in 1979.

== Background ==
Yuki is a white mongrel. The name means snow in Japanese. Yuki was the first rescue dog to enter the White House. Yuki and Johnson, at times, sang together.

== Biography ==
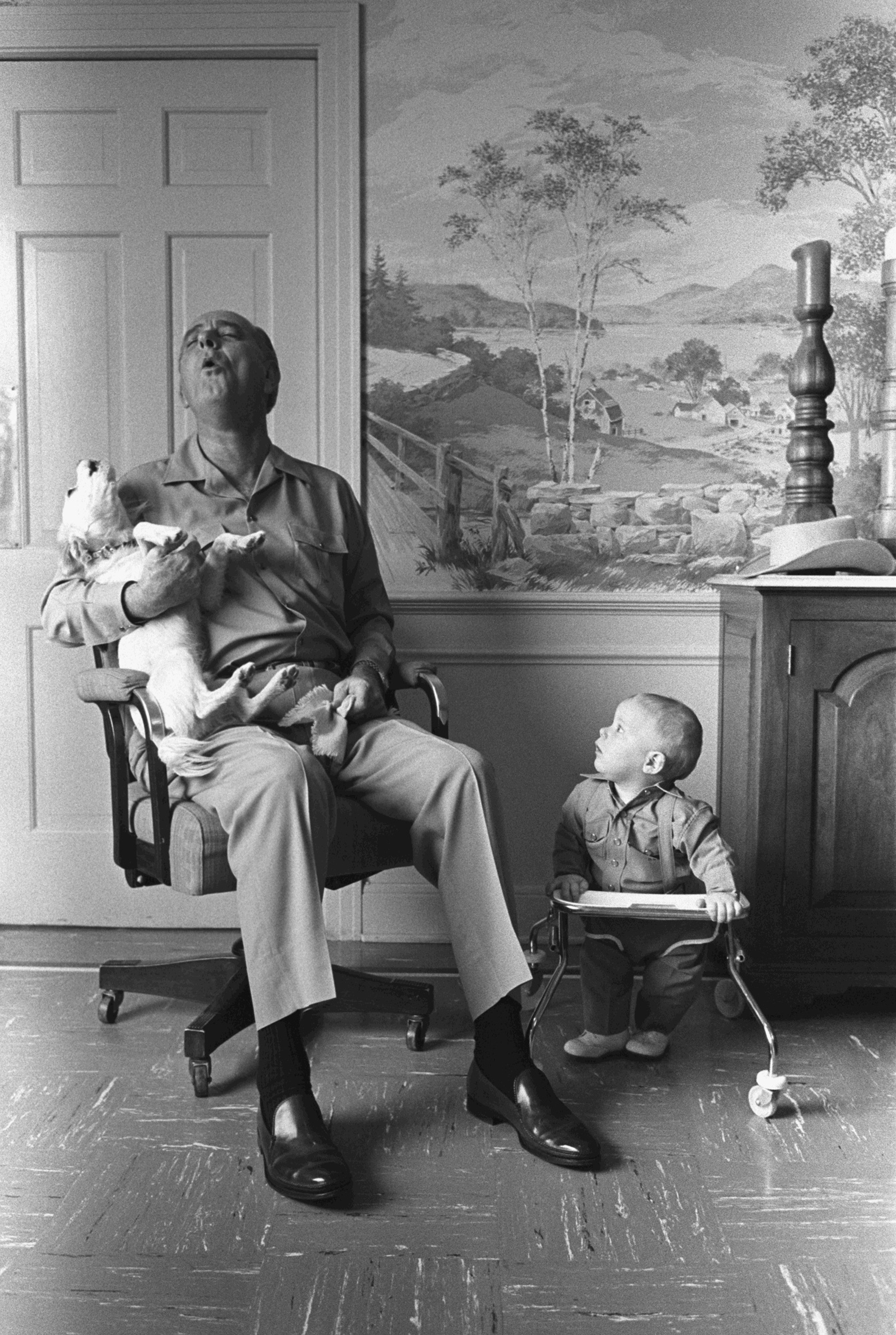
President Lyndon B. Johnson sings with Yuki.

Luci and Patrick Nugent, Johnson's daughter and son-in-law, found Yuki at a gas station in Johnson City, Texas, in 1966. The gas station attendant stated that a customer had left Yuki. Luci and Patrick Nugent then left their name with the attendant and took Yuki to Johnson's ranch.

A Secret Service agent named Yuki while on the way to Johnson's ranch. Yuki lived with the Nugents until August 1967, when they vacationed in the Bahamas. Yuki, along with Patrick Lyndon and three other dogs, stayed with Johnson at the White House. After her vacation, Luci Nugent found that Yuki and Johnson grown attached to each other and let Johnson keep Yuki for as long as he wanted. Nugent officially transferred ownership of Yuki to Johnson as a 59th birthday present on August 27, 1967.

After Johnson left office on January 20, 1969, Yuki went with him to Johnson's ranch. Yuki stayed with Johnson until January 1973, when Johnson died with Yuki at his side. After Johnson died, Yuki stayed with Nugents until he died in 1979.
