= Old Whitey (horse) =

Zachary Taylor's Warhorse

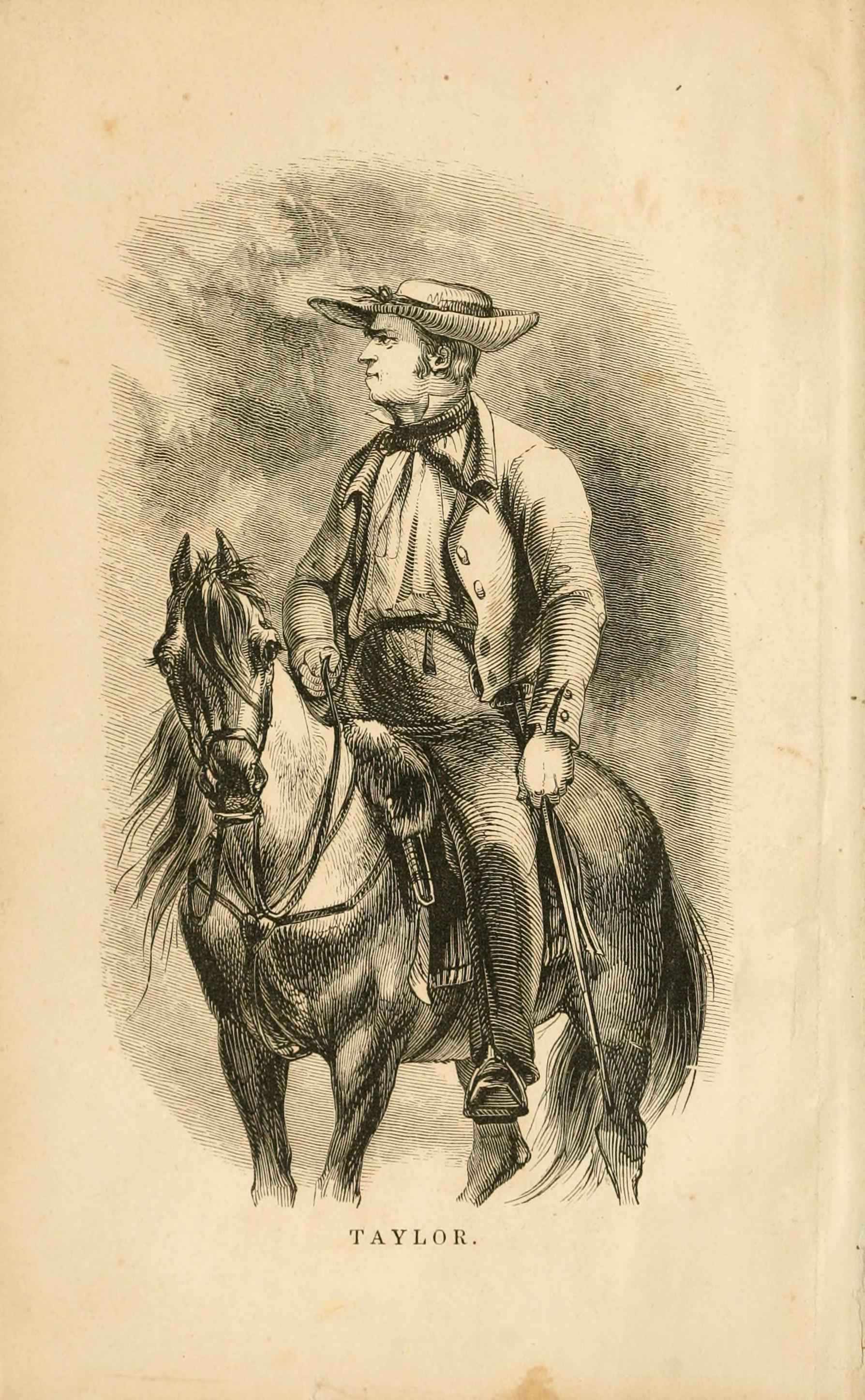
This engraving shows Zachary Taylor on his horse who is likely Old Whitey

Old Whitey was a horse that belonged to Zachary Taylor, the 12th president of the United States. The horse was purchased by George McCall.

== Mexican–American War ==
Old Whitey was Taylor's war horse, during the Mexican–American War. He was the antithesis of a war horse, due to his light coloration. Taylor used him anyway and he was just as Taylor wanted. Taylor was known to sit calmly on Old Whitey as bullets went past his head.

== White House years ==
Old Whitey would often be seen grazing on the White House lawn. Old Whitey's tail was picked and plucked by visitors as a souvenir and for a memory. This happened until his full tail was picked clean.

== Later years ==
After Taylor died Old Whitey led the funeral. Although much about Old Whitey's fate is unknown there is some evidence of what happened. There was a January 1897 article found by Pat Granstra with a quote from Taylor's daughter insisting that Old Whitey lived a long time.

It read the following:

You ask about Old Whitey; he was a great pet to us and all, and was never ridden after my father's return from Mexico, and when we went to Washington the horse was sent to his plantation. During his term as President there was so much interest and curiosity expressed to see the old charger that he had brought him to Washington, and after my father's death, he was sent back to the plantation, then the home of my brother Richard, where Whitey lived to a good old age.

== See also ==
- United States presidential pets
- List of historical horses
