= United States presidential pets =

Companion animals of American presidents

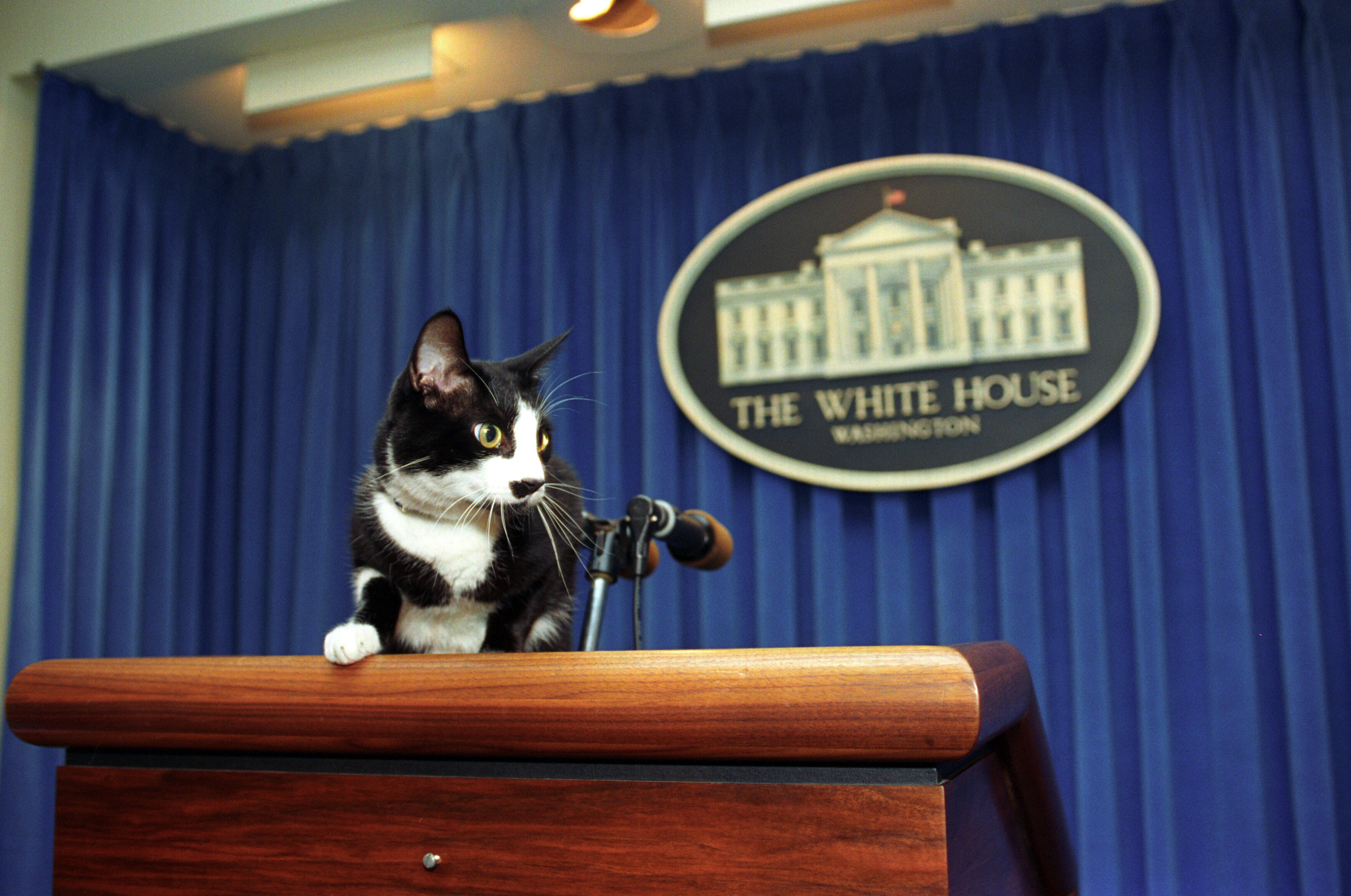
Socks at the White House Press Briefing Room lectern in 1993

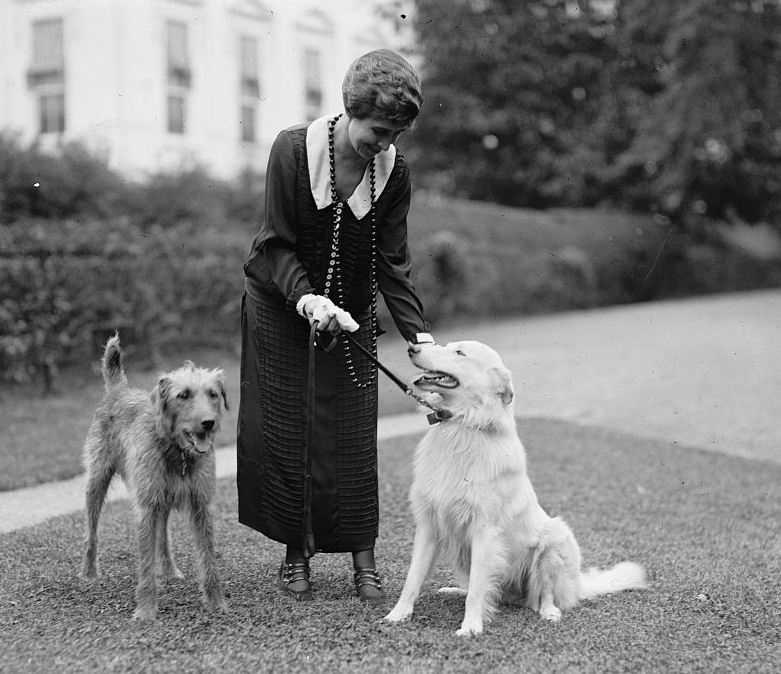
Grace Coolidge with Laddie Boy, an Airedale Terrier, and Rob Roy, a white Collie

Most United States presidents have kept pets while in office, or pets have been part of their families. Only James K. Polk, Andrew Johnson, and Donald Trump did not have any presidential pets while in office (however, Johnson did take care of some mice he found in his bedroom).

== History of White House pets ==
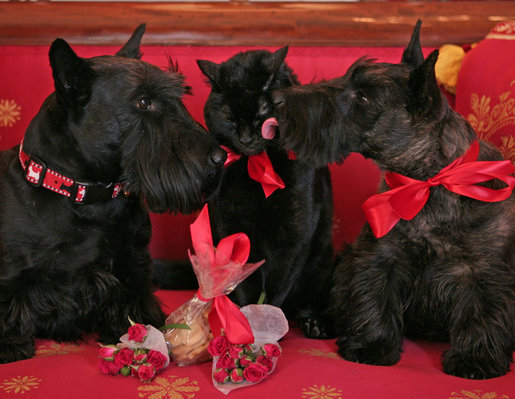
Barney, India, and Miss Beazley, three pets of the George W. Bush White House

The first White House dog to receive regular newspaper coverage was Warren G. Harding's dog Laddie Boy.

Pets also featured in presidential elections. Herbert Hoover got a "Belgian Police Dog" (Belgian Malinois), King Tut, during his campaign and pictures of him with his new dog were sent all across the United States.

Theodore Roosevelt was known for having many pets in the White House. He had six children who owned pets including snakes, dogs, cats, a badger, birds, and guinea pigs.

In 1944, Franklin D. Roosevelt was running for his fourth term when rumors surfaced that his Scottish Terrier, Fala, had accidentally been left behind when visiting the Aleutian Islands. After allegedly sending back ships to rescue his dog, Roosevelt was ridiculed and accused of spending thousands of taxpayers' dollars to retrieve his dog. At a speech following this Roosevelt said, "You can criticize me, my wife and my family, but you can't criticize my little dog. He's Scottish and all these allegations about spending all this money have just made his little soul furious." What was later called the "Fala speech" reportedly helped secure reelection for Roosevelt.

Richard Nixon was accused of hiding a secret slush fund during his candidacy for vice president under Dwight D. Eisenhower in 1952. He gave the televised "Checkers speech" named after his Cocker Spaniel, denying he had a slush fund but admitting, "there is one thing that I did get as a gift that I'm not going to give back." The gift was a black-and-white Cocker Spaniel, Checkers, given to his daughters. Although there had been talk of Nixon being dropped from the ticket, following his speech he received an increase in support and Mamie Eisenhower reportedly recommended he stay because he was "such a warm person."

Lyndon B. Johnson caused controversy when he was photographed lifting his beagles, named Him and Her, by their ears. Some did not understand the controversy; former president Harry S. Truman said, "What the hell are the critics complaining about; that's how you handle hounds." Him died after he was run over by the presidential limousine.

Bill Clinton moved into the White House with Socks, a tuxedo cat, who in 1991 was reported to have jumped into the arms of Chelsea Clinton after piano lessons while the Clintons were living in Little Rock, Arkansas. He was later joined in 1997 by Buddy, a Labrador Retriever, during Clinton's second term. The two pets reportedly did not get along, with Clinton later saying "I did better with the Palestinians and the Israelis than I've done with Socks and Buddy" while Hillary Clinton said Socks "despised" Buddy at first sight. The two were, however, the subject of a book, Dear Socks, Dear Buddy: Kids' Letters to the First Pets written by then first lady Hillary Clinton and appeared as cartoons in the kids' section of the first White House website.

While George W. Bush was president, he had three dogs and a cat at the White House. Among the canines was Spot Fetcher, an English Springer Spaniel and the offspring of George H. W. Bush's dog, Millie. This made Spotty the first animal to live in the White House under two different administrations, having been born there in 1989 and died there in 2004.

Barack and Michelle Obama were without pets prior to the 2008 election, but promised their daughters they could get a dog when the family moved into the White House. They selected Bo, a Portuguese Water Dog, partly due to Malia Obama's allergies and the need for a hypoallergenic pet. The puppy was a gift from Senator Ted Kennedy and was later joined by Sunny, a female of the same breed. Bo was featured in the 2010 children's book Of Thee I Sing: A Letter to My Daughters, written by President Obama with illustrations by Loren Long.

Joe and Jill Biden moved into the White House with two German Shepherds, Champ and Major. Major was the first shelter dog in the White House, while Champ returned to Washington, having joined the Biden family during Joe Biden's tenure as vice-president. The Bidens announced the death of 13-year-old Champ on June 19, 2021. In December 2021, the Bidens announced the arrival of a pedigreed German Shepherd puppy named Commander, gifted to them by Joe Biden's brother. Officials later told the press that Major had been rehomed to a quieter environment following a series of biting incidents. Commander also had to be rehomed after at least 25 biting incidents. The Bidens had also promised they would get a cat, and they fulfilled that promise in January 2022 by adding a two-year-old gray tabby, Willow, to the family.

== List of presidential pets ==
In addition to traditional pets, this list includes some animals normally considered livestock or working animals that have a close association with presidents or their families. Presidents have often been given exotic animals from foreign dignitaries; occasionally these are kept, but often they are promptly donated to a zoo.

=== George Washington ===
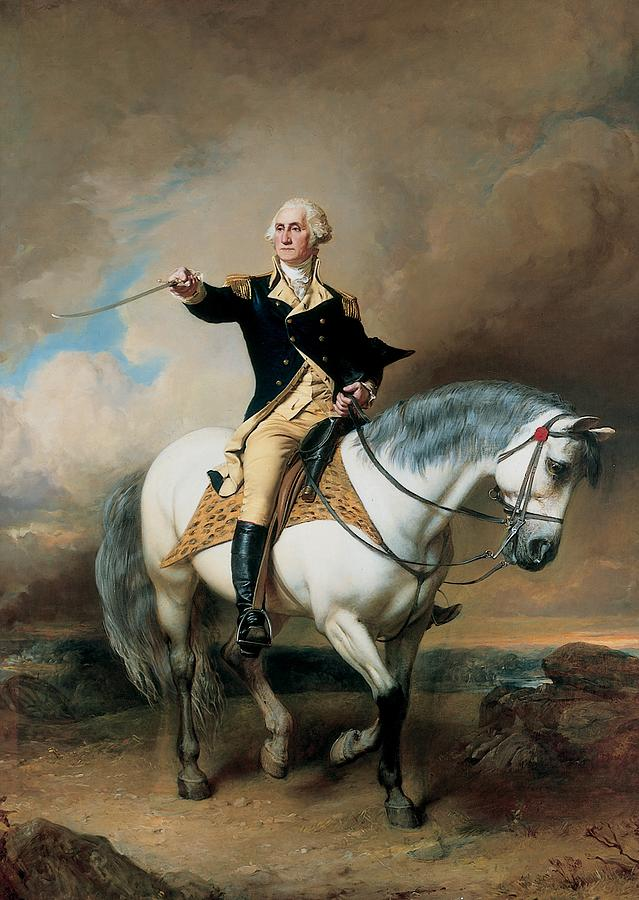
Portrait of George Washington Taking the Salute at Trenton by John Faed shows Washington on his horse Blueskin

- Sweetlips, Scentwell and Vulcan (among others) (Note: Number unknown) – American Foxhounds (Note: Washington was an avid dog breeder; he called the breed that he was developing "Virginia Hounds"; which eventually became American Foxhounds)
- Drunkard, Taster, Tipler, and Tipsy – Black and Tan Coonhounds
- Royal Gift – Andalusian donkey, a gift from King Charles III of Spain
- Nelson (1763–1790) and Blueskin – horses (Note: Breed unknown) that were Washington's wartime mounts
- Snipe (Note: Some sources reference the name "Polly") – parrot (Note: Species unknown) said to have been owned by First Lady Martha Washington
- Cornwallis – greyhound named for General Cornwallis
- Samson, Steady, Leonidas, Traveller, and Magnolia – stallions

=== John Adams ===
- Juno, Mark, and Satan – dogs
- Cleopatra and Caesar – horses

=== Thomas Jefferson ===
- Dick – mockingbird; Dick was the favorite from among at least four mockingbirds the president had while in office
- Bergère and Grizzle – shepherd dogs from France, possibly Briards
- Two grizzly bear cubs, (Note: Name unknown) a male and female pair given by Captain Zebulon Pike. Jefferson deemed them "too dangerous & troublesome for me to keep" and gave them to Charles Willson Peale's Philadelphia Museum
- Caractacus – horse named after Caratacus, a 1st-century British chieftain. The horse was the offspring of Jefferson's mare Allycroker and a Godolphin Arabian named Young Fearnought
- Sheep – beginning in 1807, the president bred sheep from "four of the most remarkeable varieties (Note: Including a "Bengal ewe" (Desi sheep) and "a ram and a ewe of the Barbary Broadtail breed"; see American Tunis) [...] pro bono publico." By spring 1808, nearly 40 sheep were grazing at the president's house. One notorious Shetland ram was said to have killed "a fine little boy." (Note: In February 1808, nine-year-old Alexander Kerr while taking a shortcut home from school across the White House lawn was gored by the ram; the injury became fatal one week later.)

=== James Madison ===
- Polly – a parrot that outlived both James and Dolley Madison
- Sheep – grazed on the White House lawn

=== James Monroe ===
- Buddy - A spaniel belonged to Monroe's youngest daughter, Maria Hester Monroe
- Sheepdogs were provided by Marquis de Lafayette as working dogs on Monroe's farm.

=== John Quincy Adams ===
- Silkworms whose silk First Lady Louisa Adams spun.
- An alligator – Said to have belonged to Marquis de Lafayette and housed for two months in the East Room. (Note: The East Room was still under repair following the 1814 burning of the White House by the British, and was primarily used for storage. During the visit of the Marquis de Lafayette to the United States, Lafayette acquired several tons of gifts (including the alligator) that was stored there, much to the consternation of visitors. Possibly sent to France aboard the USS Brandywine.) (Note: See: Conveying Marquis de Lafayette to France) Although this story has been widely circulated, the lack of evidence from contemporary accounts or official records suggests an apocryphal myth.

=== Andrew Jackson ===
- Poll – grey parrot who learned to swear. Anecdotally, (Note: This tale is entirely based on the memory of a 90-year-old man recalling an event he witnessed as a teenager, first appearing in print 76 years after the funeral) it is said that she attended Jackson's funeral and had to be removed due to loud and persistent profanity.
- Fighting cocks
- Bolivia, Emily, Lady Nashville, Sam Patch, and Truxton – horses Sam Patch was named after the famous daredevil known as "The Yankee Leaper."

=== Martin Van Buren ===
- Two tiger cubs – It is said that Van Buren received them from Said bin Sultan, Sultan of Muscat and Oman but Congress quickly forced him to donate the tigers to the zoo. This story, however, is likely untrue and conflated with a rumor of a similar story at the time, relating to a gift including two lions from the emperor of Morocco and the American Consulate in Tangier. Although the Sultan did send a ship with many exotic gifts, (including two horses) that became a point of contention within Congress, there is no contemporary reference to tiger cubs.

=== William Henry Harrison ===
- Sukey – Durham cow
- Whisker – Goat

=== John Tyler ===
- Le Beau – Italian Greyhound
- Johnny Ty – Canary. Brought to the White House by Tyler's second wife, Julia Gardiner Tyler
- The General – Horse

=== James K. Polk ===
- None

=== Zachary Taylor ===
- Old Whitey – horse Taylor's wartime mount
- Apollo – Pony; formerly a "trick pony" from a circus, a present for Taylor's daughter Betty and resided in the White House stables with Old Whitey

=== Millard Fillmore ===
- Mason and Dixon – ponies; named after the famous surveyors

=== Franklin Pierce ===
- At least two (Note: Number uncertain, perhaps received as many as seven. "Pierce was thought to have kept one dog, and he gave the other to his Secretary of War, Jefferson Davis. Davis was particularly pleased with the dog and was known to have carried it with him in his pocket.") miniature "teacup" Japanese Chin dogs, part of a gift exchange with Japan following the Perry Expedition
- Two birds from Japan, which had just opened its trading posts to the United States.

=== James Buchanan ===
- Lara – Newfoundland
- Punch – Toy terrier
- Eagle
- Two Thai elephants – Mary and Buddha; sent to President Buchanan by King Mongkut of Siam, but arrived when Abraham Lincoln was president who refused them as a gift. The elephants were then sent to the Philadelphia Zoo.

=== Abraham Lincoln ===
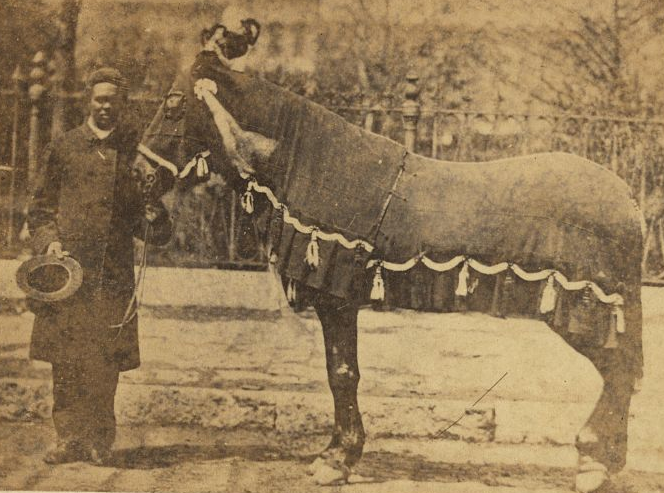
Old Bob caparisoned in a mourning blanket at Abraham Lincoln's funeral

- Nanny and Nanko – Goats
- Jack – Turkey, intended as Christmas dinner, but Tad Lincoln intervened
- Fido – Dog, "assassinated" by a drunk with a knife, a few months after Lincoln's assassination; Lincoln's famous dog may have popularized the use of the name "Fido".
- Jip – Dog
- Tabby and Dixie – cats. Lincoln was gifted Tabby and Dixie from his Secretary of State William Seward when it was decided that Lincoln's dog Fido would have to stay home in Illinois after his election. Lincoln once remarked that Dixie "is smarter than my whole cabinet."
- Horse
- Rabbit
- Old Bob – Horse
- Pig – One lived on the White House grounds

=== Andrew Johnson ===
- Johnson fed white mice that he found in his bedroom

=== Ulysses S. Grant ===
- Butcher's Boy, Cincinnati, Egypt, Jeff Davis (his wartime mount), Jennie, Julia, Mary, and St. Louis – Horses. Grant purchased Butcher's Boy from a butcher following an impromptu race on D.C. streets where he lost to this horse pulling a butcher's cart. Cincinnati was a thoroughbred of renowned racing pedigree.
- Billy Button and Reb – Ponies
- Faithful – Newfoundland
- Rosie – Dog
- Parrot

=== Rutherford B. Hayes ===
- Dot – Cocker Spaniel
- Hector – Newfoundland
- Duke – English Mastiff
- Grim – Greyhound
- Otis – Miniature Schnauzer
- Juno and Shep – Hunting dogs
- Jet – Dog
- Piccolomini – Cat (presumably named after the Italian general)
- Siam – First Siamese cat in the United States. First named Miss Pussy by First Lady Lucy Hayes.

=== James A. Garfield ===
- Kit – Horse
- Veto – Dog

=== Chester A. Arthur ===
- Four standardbreds
- Indian pony – gift from the Eastern Shoshone
- Coquette – Horse

=== Grover Cleveland ===
- Hector – German poodle
- Mockingbirds
- Three Dachshunds
- Gallagher – Cocker Spaniel
- Hundreds of imported fish, including exotic fish and common goldfish
  - Paradise fish – A gift from the ruler of Siam (now Thailand)

=== Benjamin Harrison ===
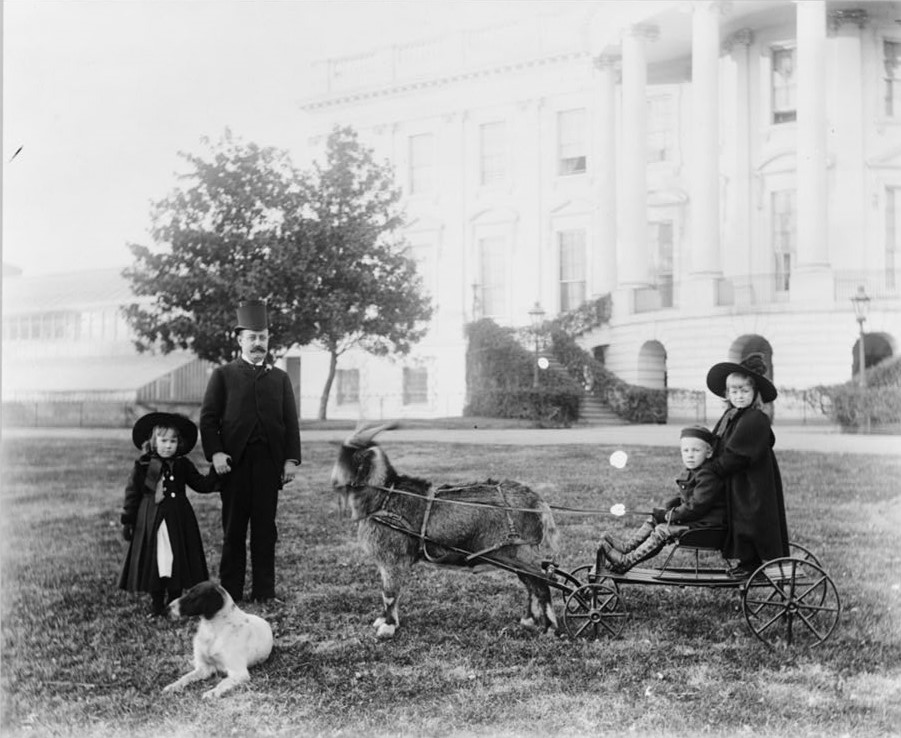
Whiskers pulling a cart at the White House, with Russell Harrison and his children

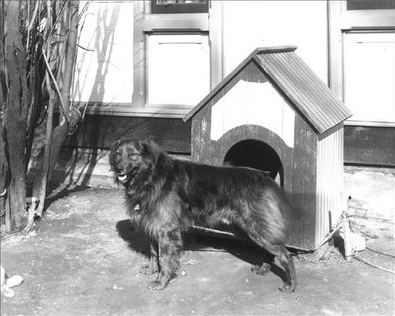
Dash in front of his doghouse

- Whiskers ("His Whiskers," or "Old Whiskers") – goat, kept at the White House for the president's grandchildren; may have belonged to Russell Harrison
- Dash – collie
- Mr. Reciprocity and Mr. Protection – opossums, named from the 1896 Republican party platform, which includes: "Protection and reciprocity are twin measures of Republican policy and go hand in hand."
- Two alligators – According to one account, Russell Harrison kept two alligators in the White House conservatory

=== William McKinley ===
- Washington Post (or "Loretta") – Yellow-headed Mexican parrot; could whistle "Yankee Doodle"
- Valeriano Weyler and Enrique DeLome – Angora kittens; named after Spanish general Valeriano Weyler and Spanish ambassador Enrique Dupuy de Lôme
- Roosters

=== Theodore Roosevelt ===
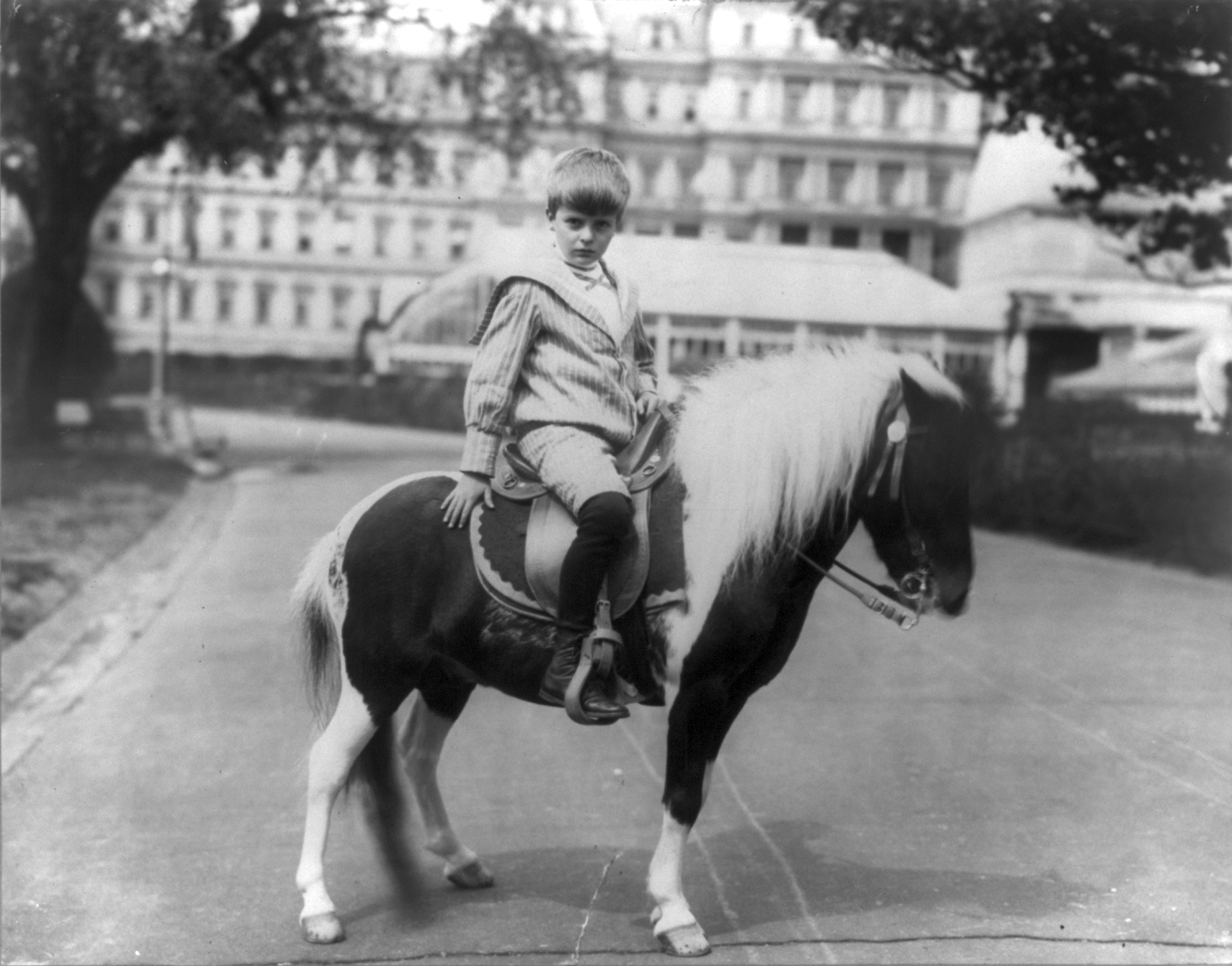
Archie riding Algonquin

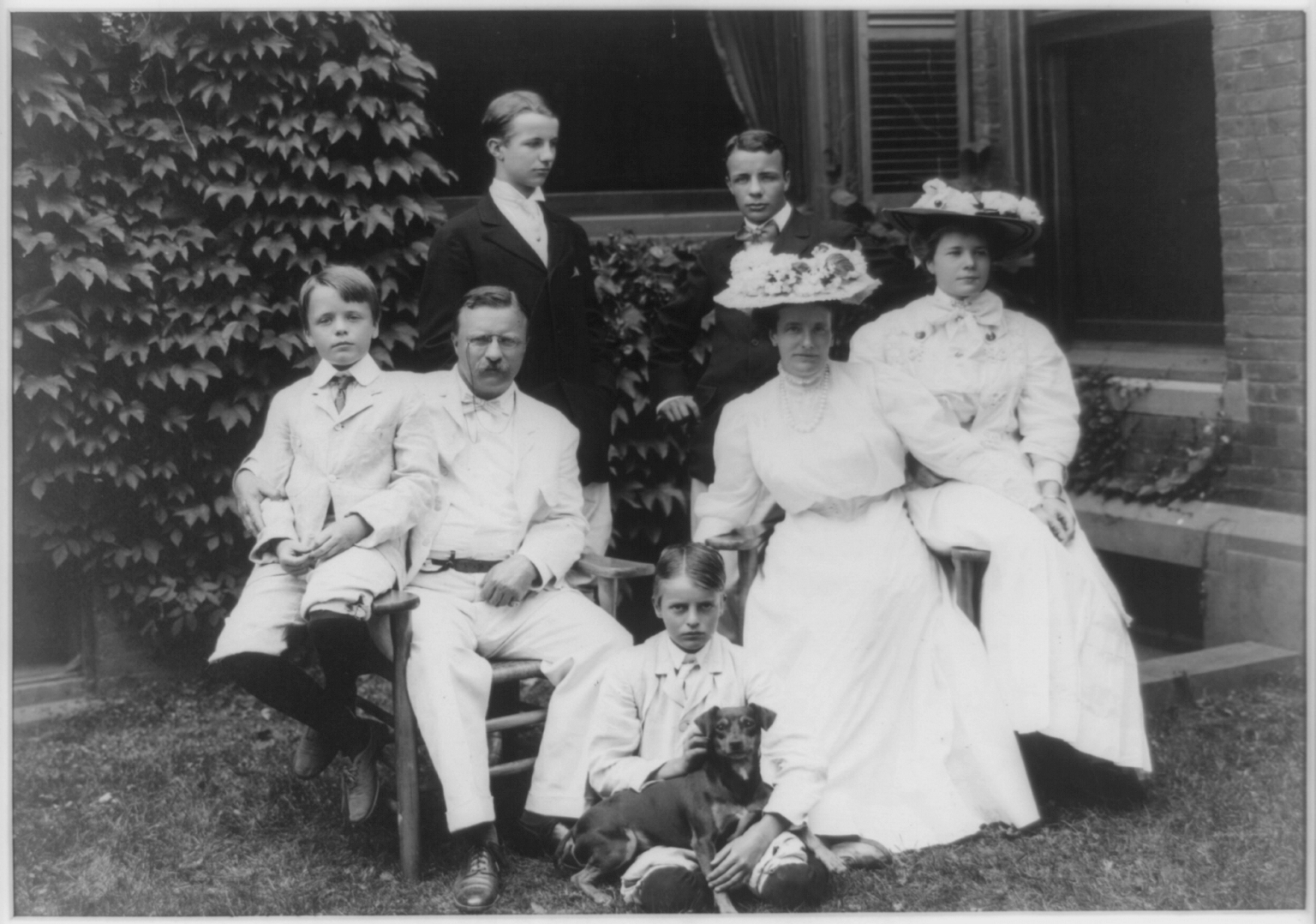
Roosevelt family with Skip

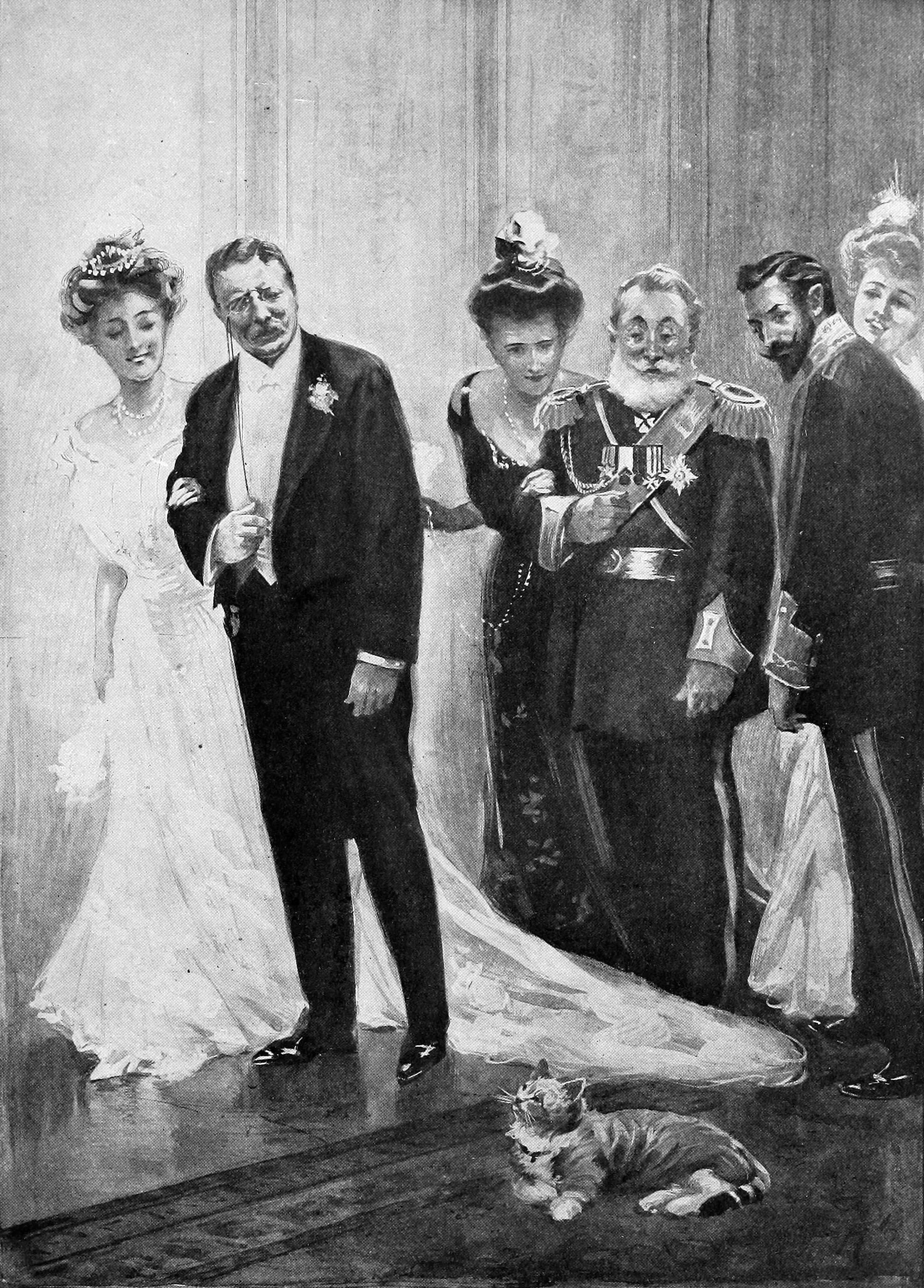
Illustration of Slippers, the White House cat (Note: Illustration from St. Nicholas (1908); original caption: "With an amused bow, the President escorted the Ambassadress around 'Slippers' and kept on his way toward the East Room.")

- Admiral Dewey, Bishop Doane, Dr. Johnson, Father O'Grady, Fighting Bob Evans – guinea pigs; namesakes: George Dewey, William Croswell Doane, (likely John O'Grady (priest)) and Robley D. Evans
- Algonquin – "Calico pony" (Shetland), favored by Roosevelt's son Archie
- Bleistein – horse. The favorite of all his horses
- Baron Spreckle – hen, likely named after sugar baron Claus Spreckels
- Bill the Lizard – lizard, brought from California and described as a "horned frog" (cf. horned toad); likely named after Lewis Carroll's Bill the Lizard.
- Blackjack – Manchester Terrier
- Eli Yale – Hyacinth macaw Named after the British merchant (also College namesake)
- Emily Spinach – garter snake, so named by Roosevelt's daughter Alice because "it was as green as spinach and as thin as my Aunt Emily"
- Fedelity – pony
- Gem and Susan – dogs
- Jack and Pete – terriers Pete was exiled to Long Island "after chomping on one too many legs."
- Jonathan Edwards – small black bear from West Virginia named after the religious leader, an ancestor of Mrs. Roosevelt; eventually sent to the Bronx Zoo
- Jonathan – Piebald rat
- Josiah (or "Josh") – badger During a railroad tour of the West, the president acquired two-week-old Josiah at a stop in Sharon Springs, Kansas
- Manchu – Pekingese dog
- Maude – pig
- Peter Rabbit – rabbit; was given a "proper state" funeral Cf. Peter Rabbit.
- Rollo – Saint Bernard
- Skip – mongrel
- Sailor Boy – Chesapeake Bay Retriever
- Tom Quartz and Slippers – Cats, Tom Quartz was named after a cat in a Mark Twain story.
- Bill – laughing hyena, gift from Emperor Menelik II of Ethiopia
- Barn owl
- Fierce – one-legged rooster
- Lion

=== William Howard Taft ===
- Caruso – dog, a gift for Taft's daughter Helen from opera singer Enrico Caruso; after a White House performance, he decided that cows were not appropriate pets for a little girl
- Mooly Wooly and Pauline Wayne – cows. Pauline (or "Miss Wayne") was a Holstein of considerable fame; she "went missing" for two days.

=== Woodrow Wilson ===
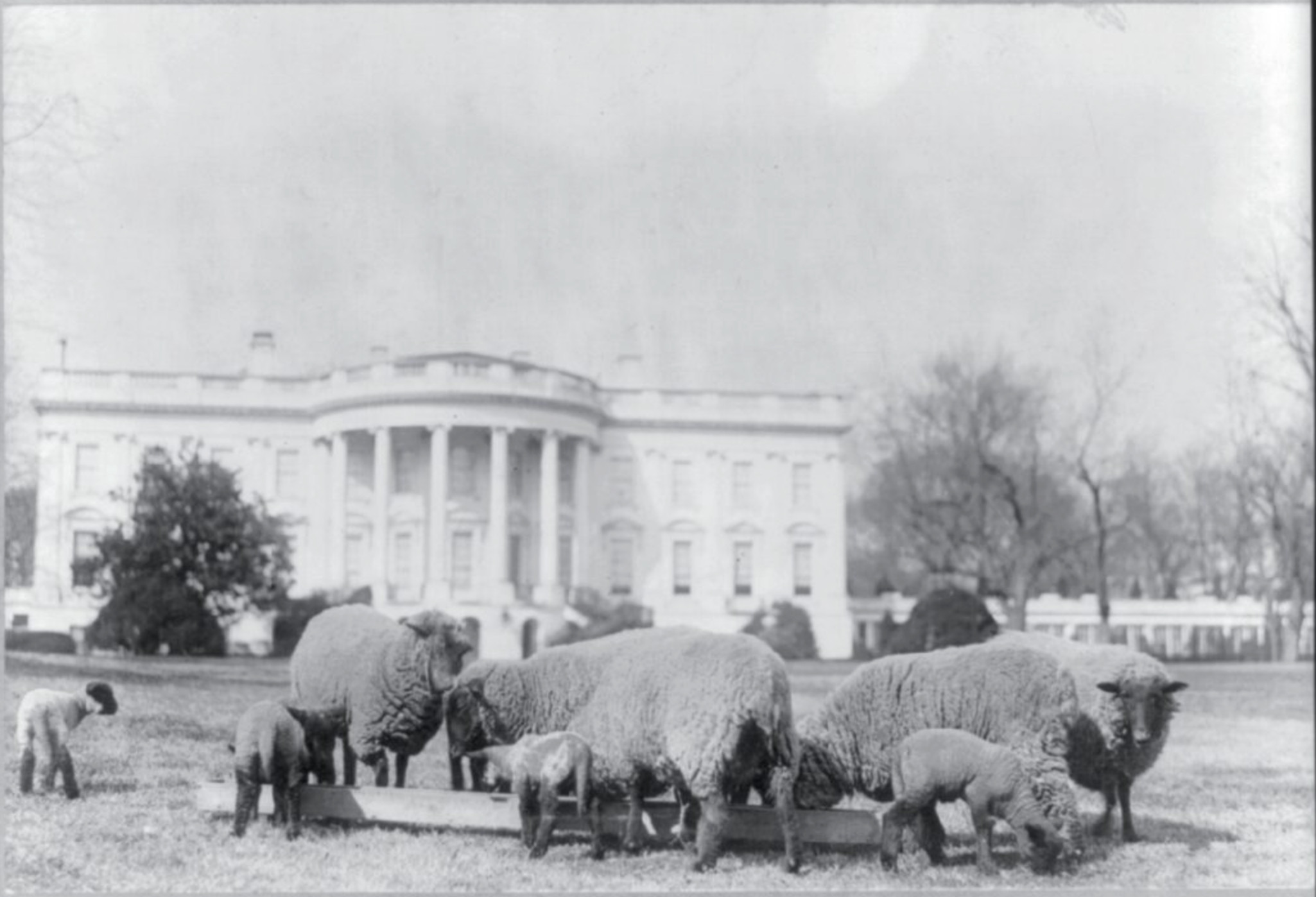
Wilson's sheep on the South Lawn

- Davie – Airedale Terrier
- Puffins – cat
- Bruce – Bull Terrier
- Songbirds
- Sheep – The flock, numbering 48 at its peak, kept the White House lawn trimmed "in the most economical way", which was framed as helping the war effort. Their wool was sold to benefit the Red Cross
  - Old Ike – ram, the herd sire of the flock of sheep.

=== Warren G. Harding ===
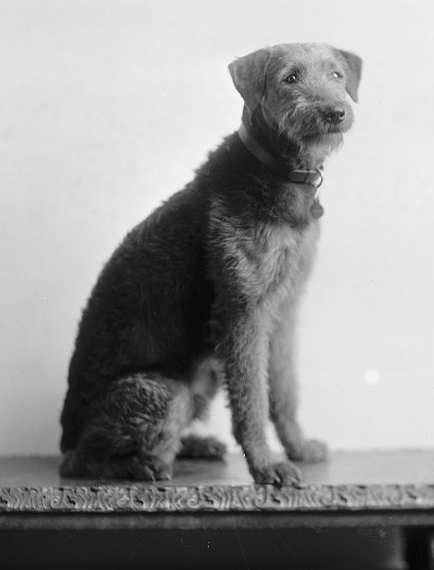
Laddie Boy

- Laddie Boy (July 26, 1920 – January 23, 1929) – Airedale Terrier
- Old Boy – Bulldog
- Petey – Canary
- Bob – Canary
- Numerous canaries, names not recorded
- Pete – Squirrel

=== Calvin Coolidge ===
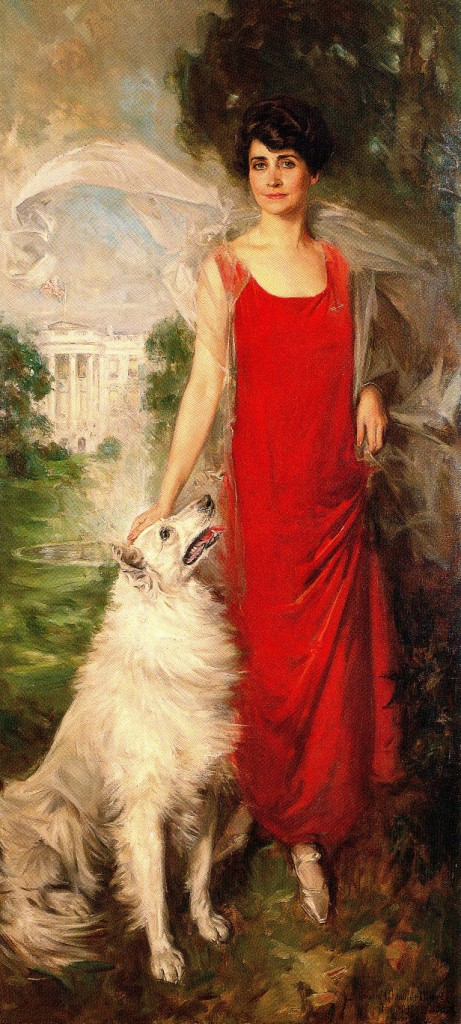
Portrait of Rob Roy and Grace Coolidge

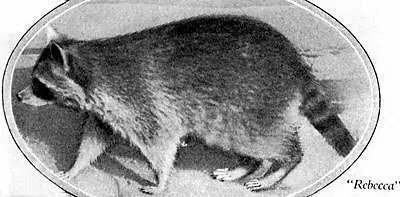
Rebecca, the White House raccoon

- Rob Roy (1922–1928) and Prudence Prim – White collies
- Peter Pan – Wirehair Fox Terrier, the Coolidges' first White House dog;
- Paul Pry – Airedale Terrier, half-brother of Warren Harding's Laddy Boy
- Calamity Jane – Shetland Sheepdog
- Tiny Tim and Blackberry – Chow Chows
- Ruby Rouch – collie
- Boston Beans – Boston bulldog
- King Cole – Belgian Sheepdog (Groenendael)
- Palo Alto ("Palo") – A black and white English Setter, a bird dog that Coolidge soon gave to Colonel Starling, chief of the Secret Service detail in the White House
- Bessie – collie
- Rebecca – raccoon, Rebecca was intended for a Thanksgiving feast; First Lady Grace had a tree-house built for her instead
- Reuben – A male raccoon acquired as a companion for Rebecca; soon escaped and not recovered
- Ebeneezer – donkey
- Nip and Tuck – canaries, both olive green in color; the Coolidges' first birds
- Peter Piper and Snowflake – Two more canaries; Snowflake was white
- Goldy – A "yellow bird"
- Do-Funny – a trained songbird (troupial) from South America; said to be Mrs. Coolidge's favorite bird
- Enoch – goose
- Smoky – bobcat
- Blacky and Tiger (or "Tige") – cats
- Tax Reduction and Budget Bureau – lion cubs from Johannesburg, South Africa
- Billy – pygmy hippopotamus, full name: William Johnson Hippopotamus
- A wallaby – Promptly given to a zoo
- A duiker (a very small type of antelope) – Also sent to the zoo
- Bruno – A black bear from Chihuahua, Mexico; Mrs. Coolidge promptly sent him to a zoo
- Pekin ducks – Thirteen ducklings were received as an Easter gift; Mrs. Coolidge attempted to raise them in a White House bathroom, but eventually sent them to a zoo

=== Herbert Hoover ===
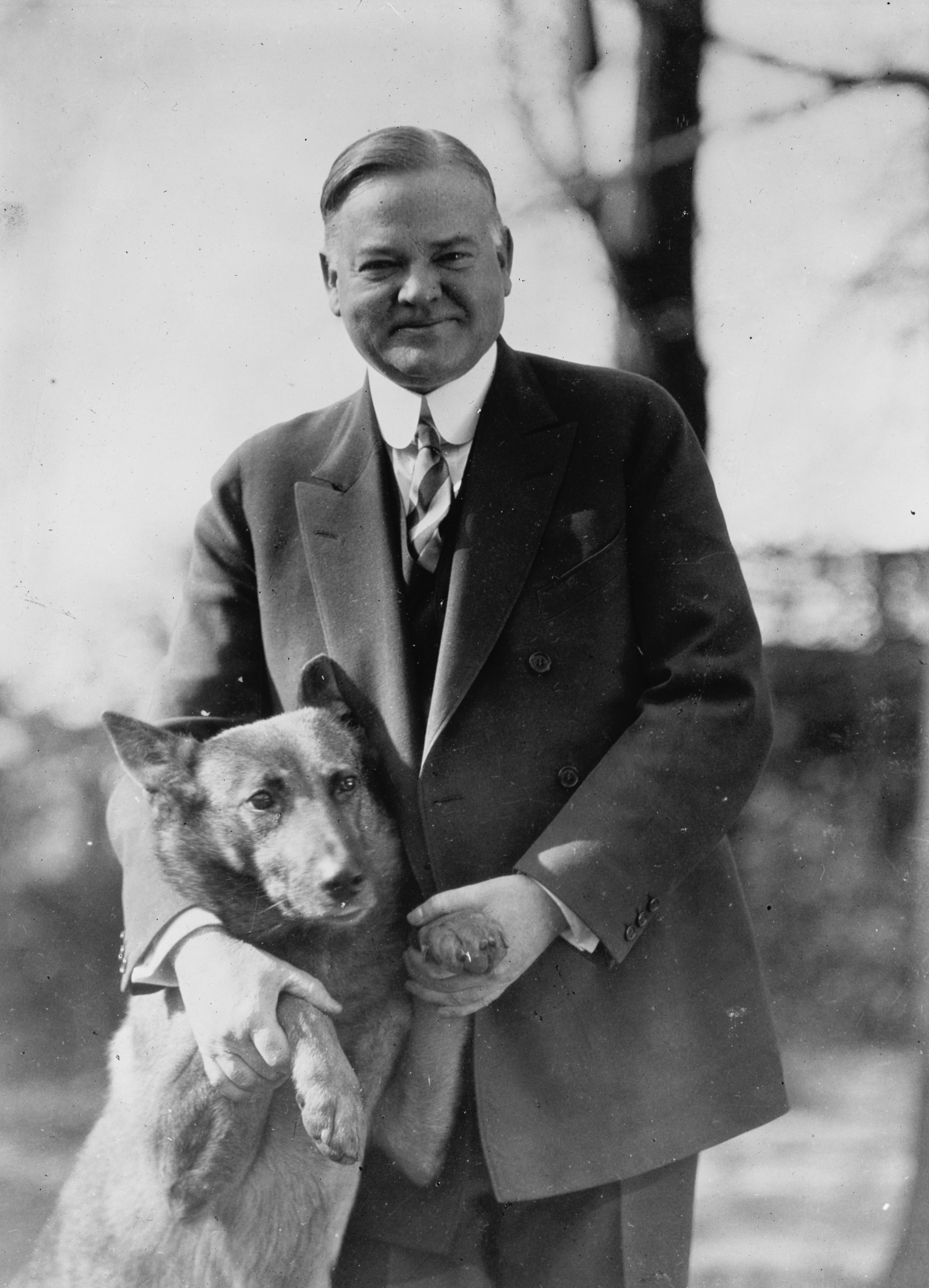
Herbert Hoover with King Tut

- Mr. Cat – a cat
- Billy Possum – A wild opossum that occupied Rebecca's vacant tree-house and was "adopted" by the Hoovers; temporarily filled in for a local high school's missing mascot. The name likely derives from a nickname used for the 27th president, William Howard Taft.
- Caruso – A Roller canary
- King Tut – Belgian Shepherd (Malinois variety)
- Pat – German Shepherd
- Big Ben and Sonnie – Fox Terriers
- Glen – Scotch Collie
- Yukonan – Canadian Eskimo Dog
- Patrick – Irish Wolfhound
- Eaglehurst Gillette – Setter
- Weegie – Norwegian Elkhound
- Alligators – Owned by his son Allan

=== Franklin D. Roosevelt ===
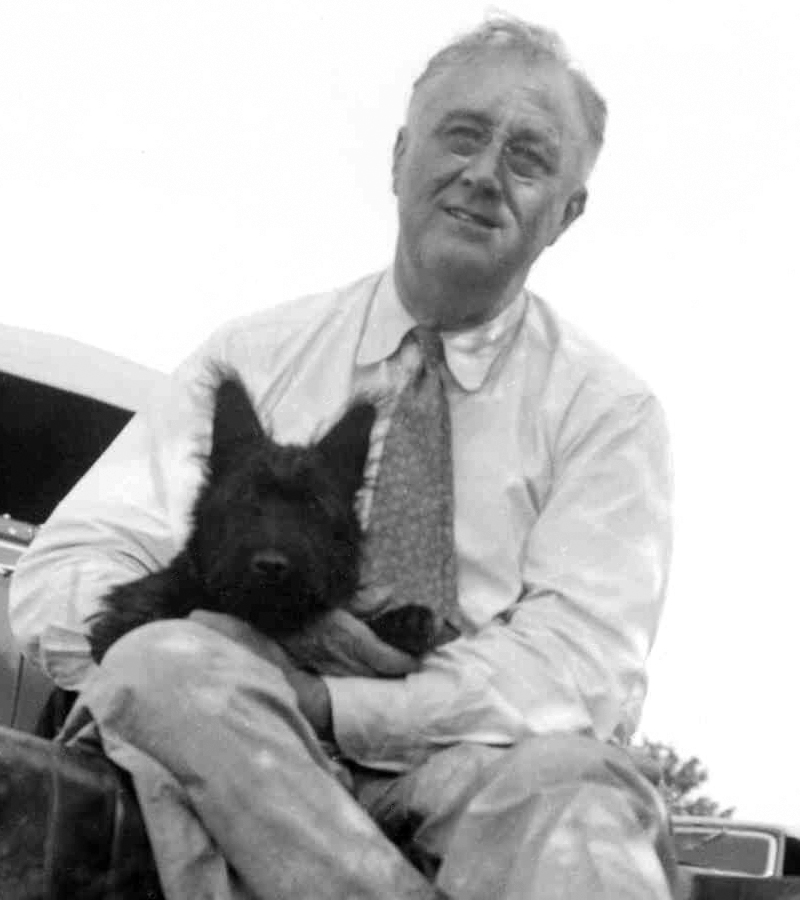
Franklin D. Roosevelt and Fala (1940)

- Fala (April 7, 1940 – April 5, 1952) – Scottish Terrier
- Major – German Shepherd Formerly a police dog from the New York State Police After a number of White House biting incidents, he was sent to live at Roosevelt's private residence in Hyde Park, New York.
- Meggie – Scottish Terrier
- Winks – Llewellyn Setter
- Tiny – Old English Sheepdog
- President – Great Dane
- Blaze – Bullmastiff

=== Harry S. Truman ===
- Feller – Cocker Spaniel, because the Trumans "preferred to be a pet-free family" he was given as a puppy to Truman's personal physician and claimed to not be a "pet lover"
- Mike – Irish Setter

=== Dwight D. Eisenhower ===
- Gabby – parakeet
- Heidi – Weimaraner
- Dzimbo – baby African forest elephant, sent by the French Community of African Republics, sent to the National Zoo

=== John F. Kennedy ===
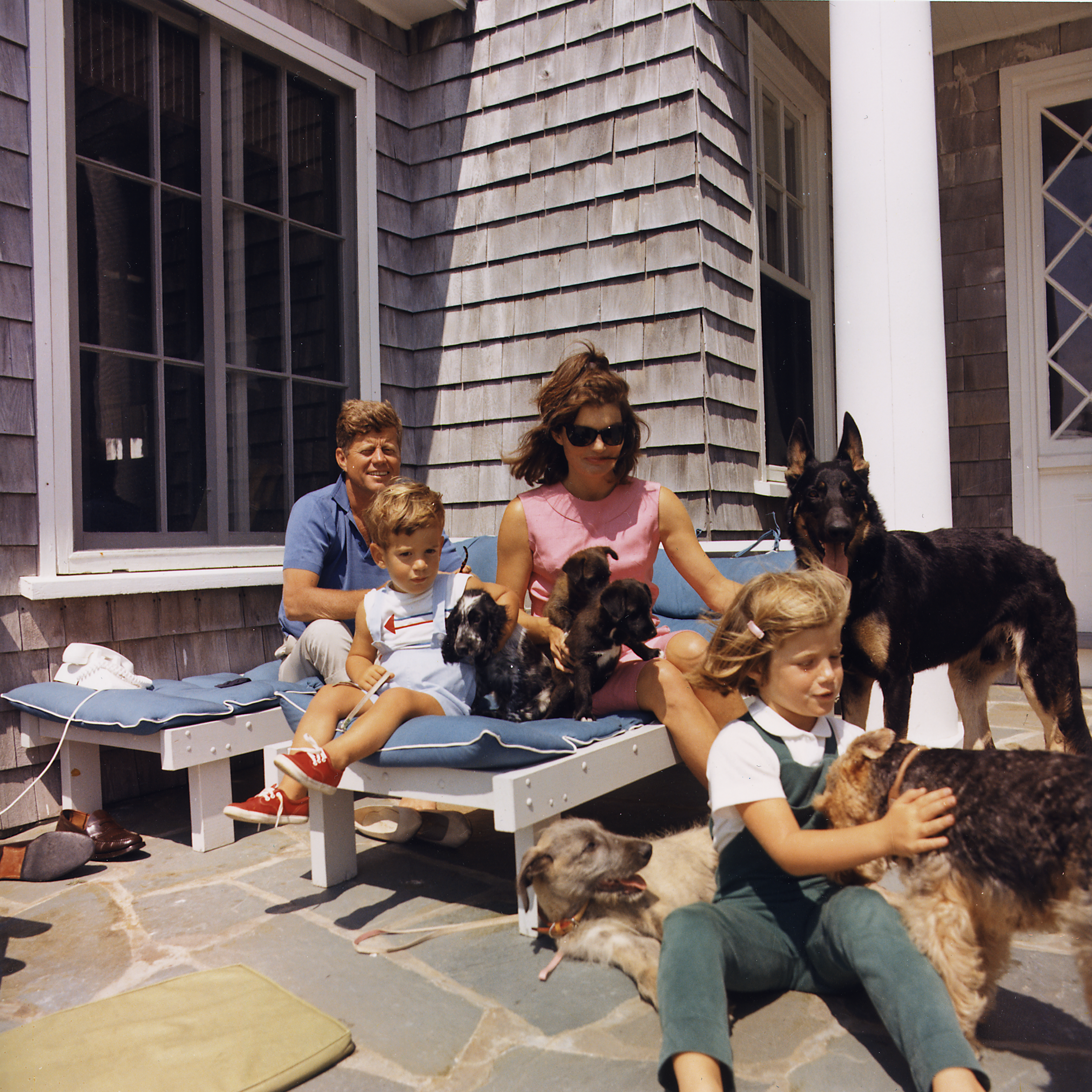
The Kennedy family and dogs

- Gaullie – Poodle
- Charlie – Welsh Terrier
- Tom Kitten – Cat
- Robin – clCanary
- Bluebell and Marybelle – Parakeets
- Ducks – JFK's daughter, five-year-old Caroline raised ducklings at the White House. Ongoing conflicts with their terrier Charlie prompted sending them to Rock Creek Park.
- Macaroni – Pony
- Tex – bay-colored Yakut pony
- Leprechaun – Connemara pony, a gift from the president of Ireland, Éamon de Valera
- Moe – Doberman Pinscher
- Billie and Debbie – hamsters
- Pushinka – dog (gift of Soviet Union Premier Nikita Khrushchev, puppy of Soviet space dog Strelka)
- Shannon – Cocker Spaniel
- Wolf – Dog, mix of Irish Wolfhound and Schnauzer
- Clipper – German Shepherd
- Butterfly, White Tips, Blackie, and Streaker – Offspring of Pushinka and Charlie
- Zsa Zsa – rabbit
- Sardar – horse
- Spotted Salamander – given by Robert F. Kennedy

=== Lyndon B. Johnson ===
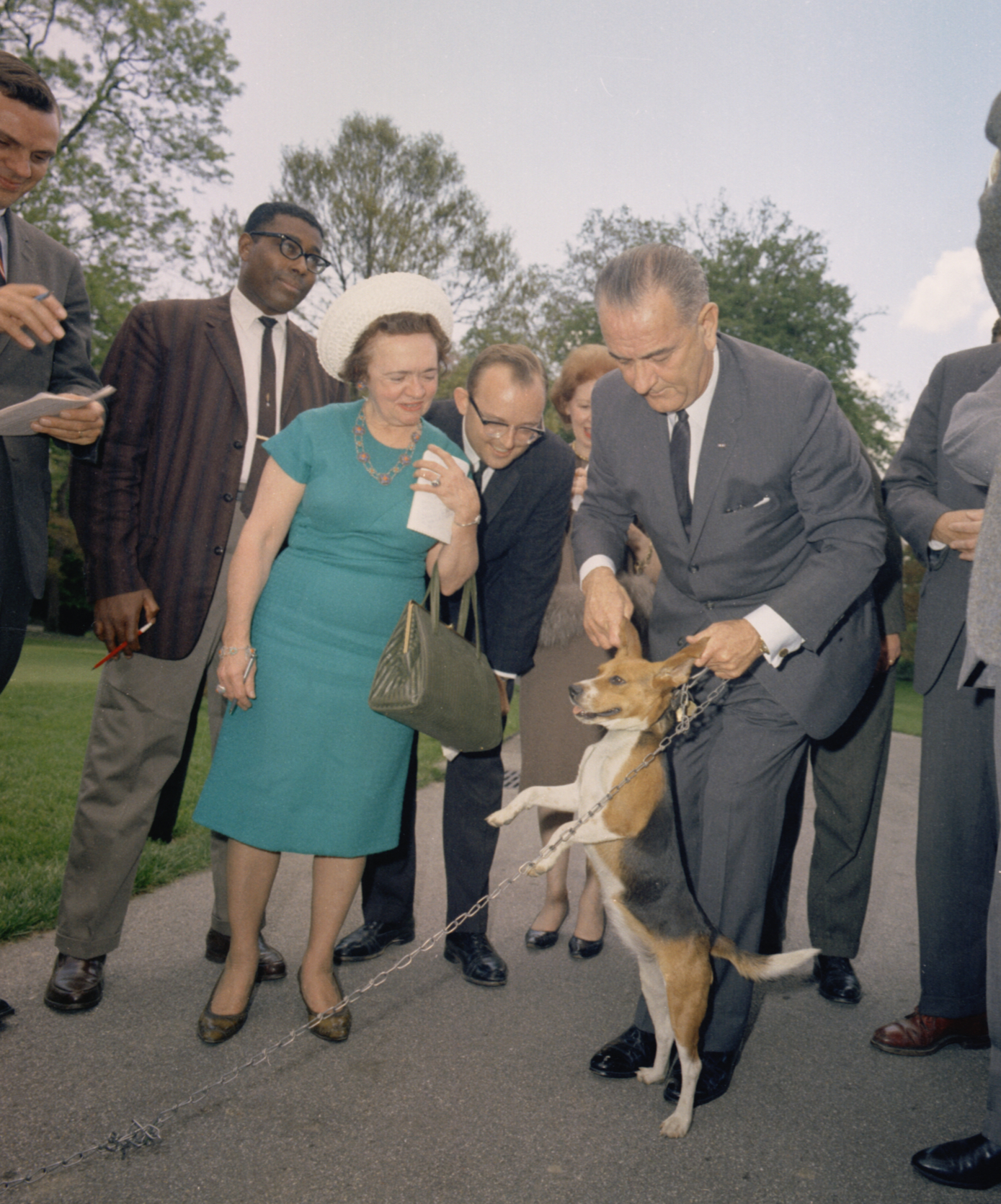
Johnson lifting Him by the ears

- Him and Her – beagles
- Edgar – beagle
- Blanco – white collie
- Freckles – beagle
- Yuki – mongrel dog famous for "singing duets" (howling) with Johnson for White House guests
- Hamsters
- Lovebirds
- Little Beagle Johnson – had the family initials LBJ

=== Richard Nixon ===
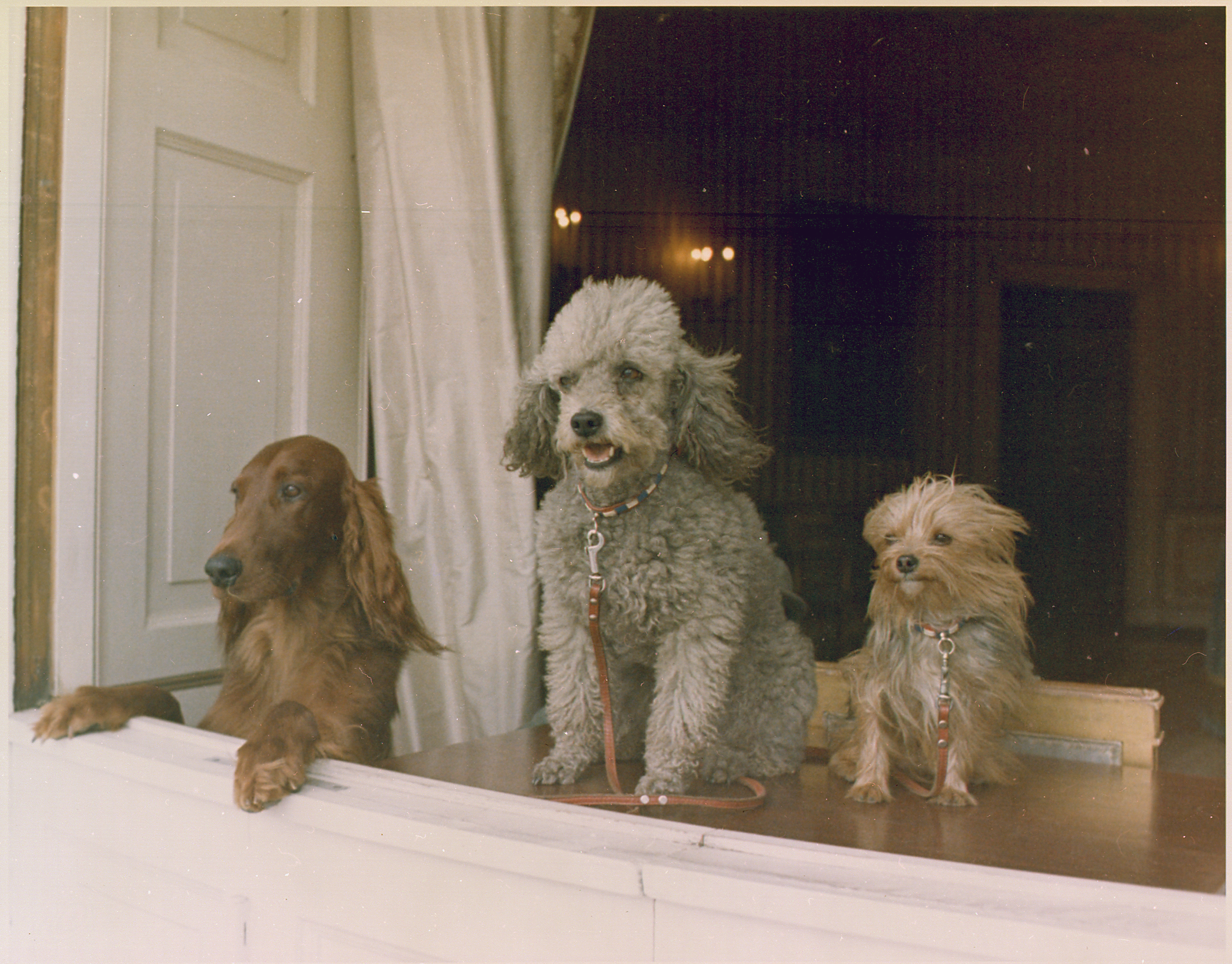
King Timahoe, Vicky and Pasha looking out the window in the White House

- Vicky – poodle
- Pasha – Yorkshire Terrier
- King Timahoe – Irish Setter
- Checkers (1952– September 9, 1964) (Note: Checkers died in 1964, before Nixon became president, but had played a major role in his electoral career) – Cocker Spaniel
- A fish

=== Gerald Ford ===
- Liberty (February 8, 1974 – 1984) – Golden Retriever
- Misty – Liberty's puppy, born in the White House
- Shan – Siamese cat

=== Jimmy Carter ===
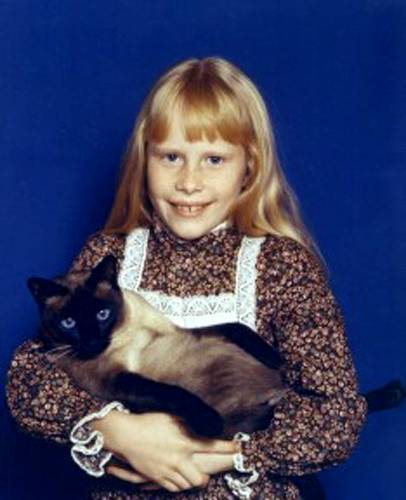
Amy Carter with her cat Misty Malarky Ying Yang

- Grits – Border Collie (mix); Given to his daughter Amy by her teacher, but quickly returned after snapping at several White House visitors
- Lewis Brown – Afghan Hound
- Misty Malarky Ying Yang, Amy's pet – Siamese cat
- Shanthi – Sri Lankan elephant; officially a gift from the children of Sri Lanka to those of the United States. Symbolically gifted to Amy.

=== Ronald Reagan ===
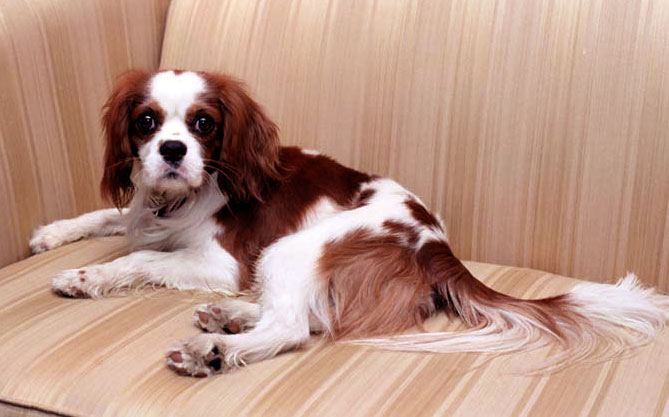
Rex, Ronald Reagan's dog

- Lucky (October 4, 1983 – January 5, 1995) – Bouvier des Flandres
- Rex (December 16, 1984 – August 31, 1998) – Cavalier King Charles Spaniel.
- Victory – Golden Retriever
- Peggy – Irish Setter
- Taca – Siberian Husky
- Fuzzy – Belgian sheepdog
- Horses (El Alamein (1971–1998), Nancy D, Baby, Little Man, No Strings and others) at Rancho del Cielo
- Cleo and Sara – tortoiseshell cats at Rancho del Cielo

=== George H. W. Bush ===
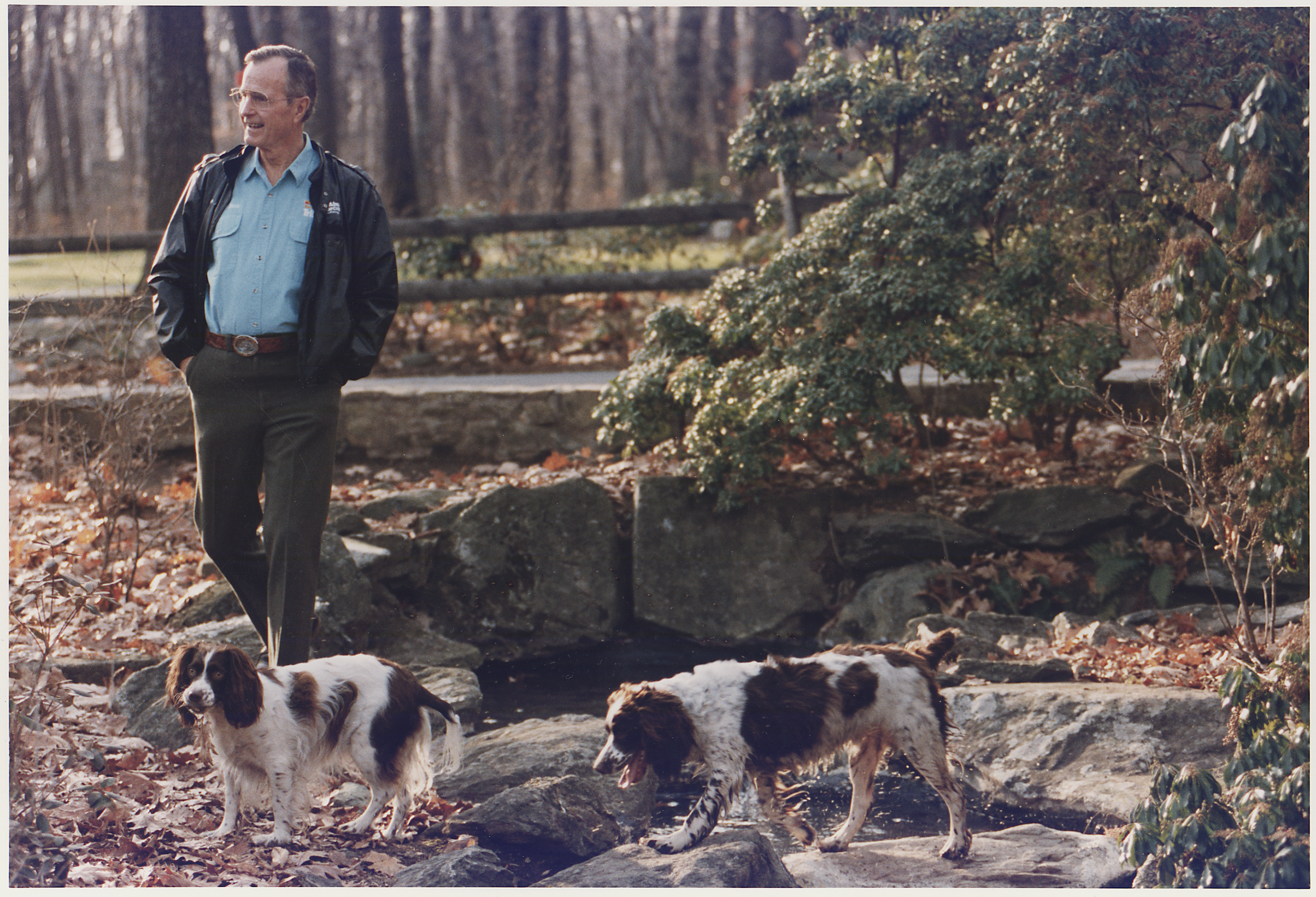
George H. W. Bush walking with Millie and Ranger

- Millie (January 12, 1985 – May 19, 1997) – Springer Spaniel. Millie "wrote" a #1 best-selling book (as interpreted by, and dictated to First Lady Barbara Bush) with proceeds donated to the nonprofit Barbara Bush Foundation for Family Literacy and earning her a Guinness World Record for "Best-selling book by a canine author."
- Ranger (March 17, 1989 – April 10, 1993) – one of Millie's puppies

=== Bill Clinton ===
- Socks (March 15, 1989 – February 20, 2009) – Cat
- Buddy (August 7, 1997 – January 2, 2002) – Chocolate Labrador Retriever

=== George W. Bush ===
- Spot "Spotty" Fetcher (March 17, 1989 – February 21, 2004) – female English Springer Spaniel named after Scott Fletcher; puppy of Millie; euthanized after suffering a series of strokes.
- Barney (September 30, 2000 – February 1, 2013) – Scottish Terrier.
- Miss Beazley (October 28, 2004 – May 17, 2014) – Scottish Terrier; nicknamed "Beazley Weazley"; 2005 birthday gift from George to his wife.
- India "Willie" (July 13, 1990 – January 4, 2009) – cat
- Ofelia – Longhorn cow (lives at Bush's Prairie Chapel Ranch)

=== Barack Obama ===
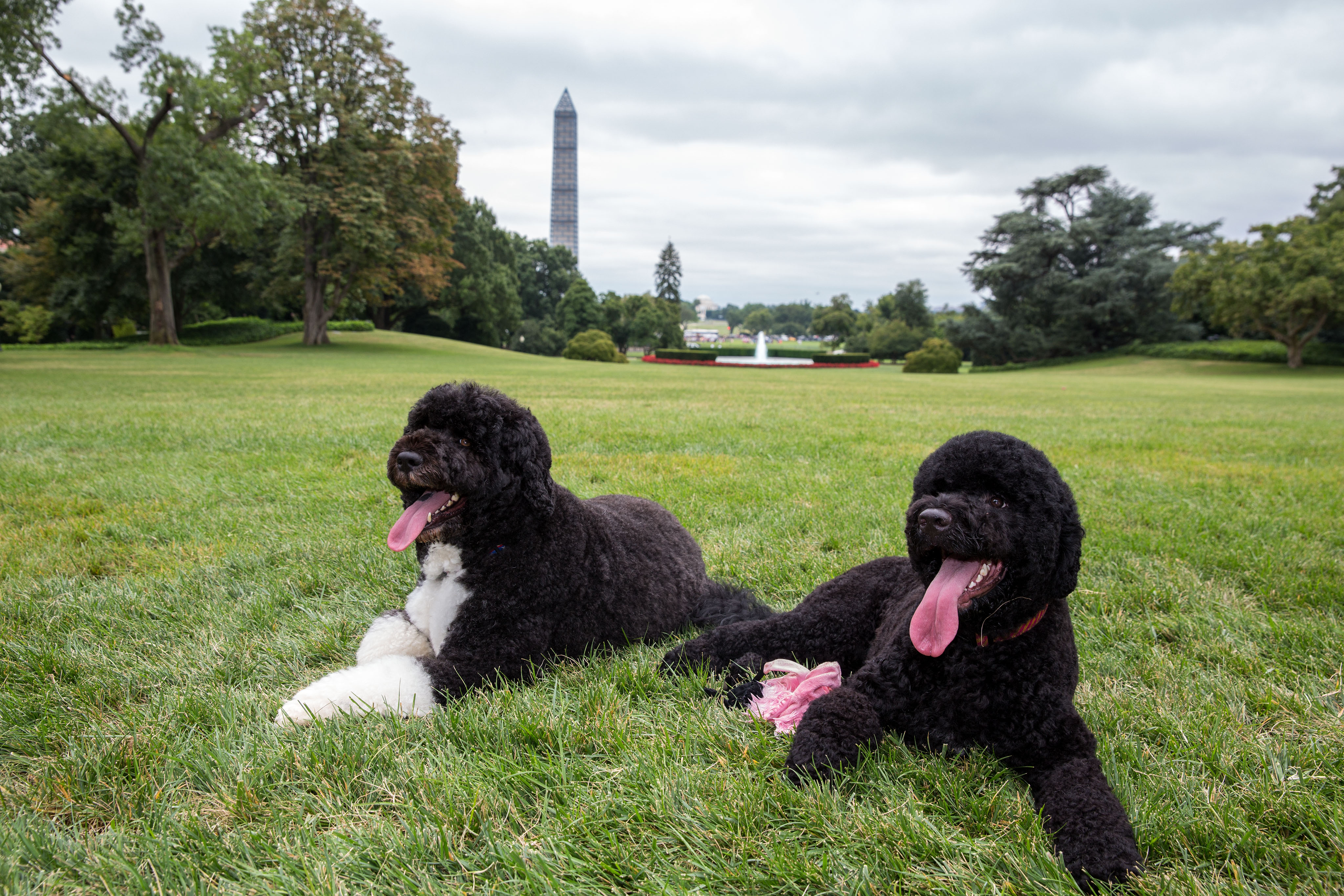
Bo and Sunny

- Bo (October 9, 2008 – May 8, 2021) – Portuguese Water Dog.
- Sunny (June 11, 2012 – September 15, 2026) – Portuguese Water Dog.

=== Donald Trump ===
- None

=== Joe Biden ===
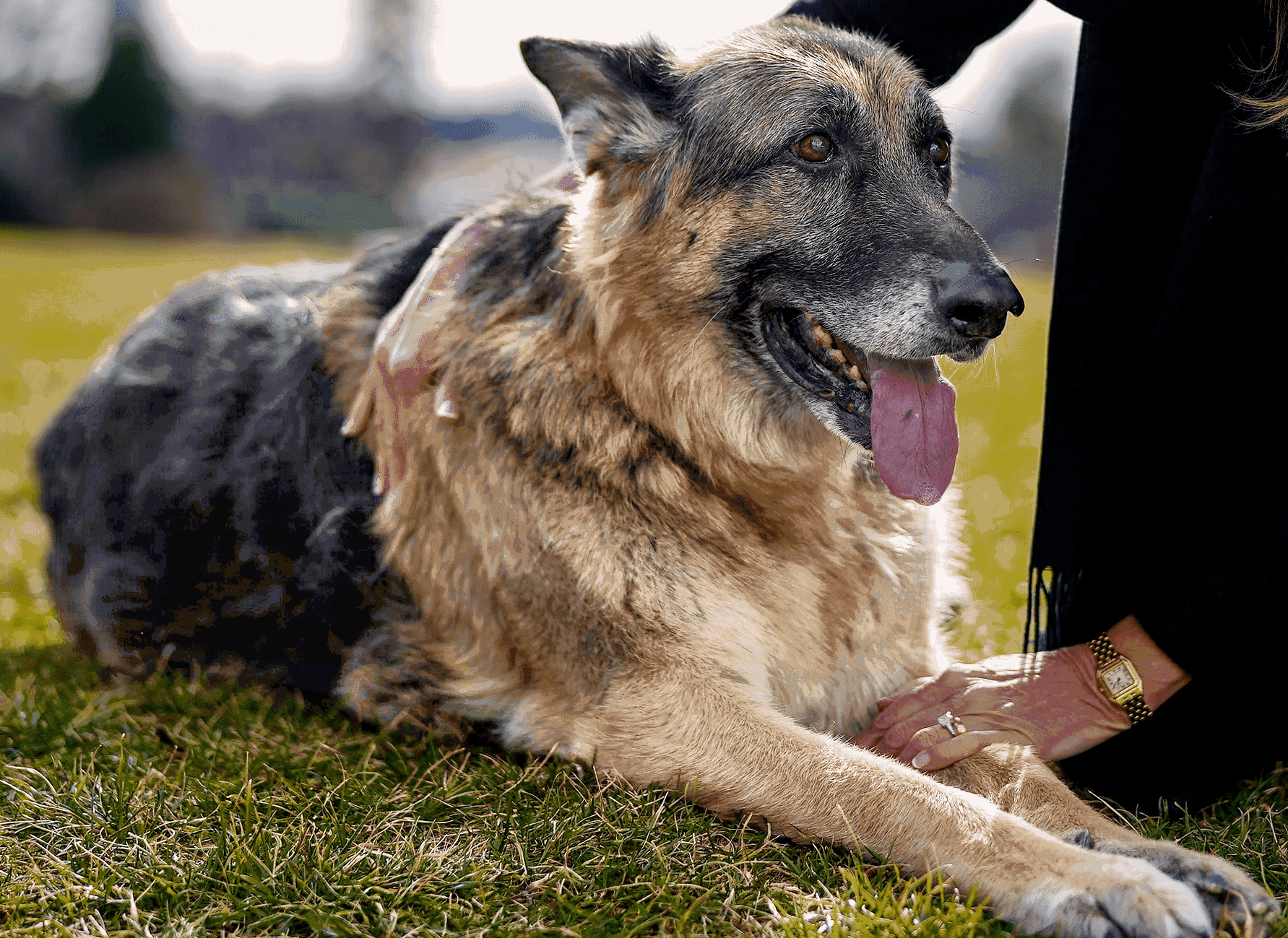
Champ

- Champ (November 11, 2008 – June 19, 2021) – German Shepherd
- Major (born January 17, 2018) – A German Shepherd rescue. Sent to live with Mississippi politician Steven A. Patterson, a family friend, in Mississippi by December 2021 after several White House biting incidents.
- Commander (born September 1, 2021) – A German Shepherd given to the Bidens as a puppy by the president's brother, also removed from White House after biting incidents.
- Willow (born January 3, 2020) – A gray tabby cat who was adopted after the cat jumped onstage during a rally in Pennsylvania in 2020. Willow, who Biden described as having "no limits," often slept on top of the president's head during his term.

== See also ==
- Canadian Parliamentary Cats
- Chief Mouser to the Cabinet Office
- Pets of Vladimir Putin
- Taiwanese presidential pets
- Horses of Andrew Jackson
- Andrew Jackson and cockfighting
