= Rob Roy (dog) =

Collie owned by Calvin Coolidge

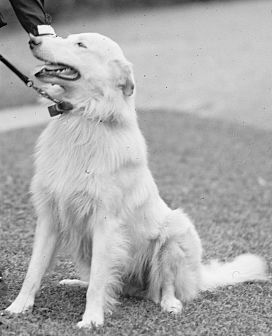
- Rob Roy, 1924 photo
- Species: Canis lupus familiaris
- Breed: collie
- Sex: Male
- Born: 1922; Oshkosh, Wisconsin, U.S.
- Died: 1928 (aged 5–6); Washington, D.C., U.S.
- Occupation: Companion animal
- Owner: Calvin Coolidge
- Appearance: White

Rob Roy (1922–1928) was a white male collie owned by Calvin Coolidge. Coolidge's favorite pet, he was acquired by Grace Coolidge in 1922 after she became enamored of collies, having seen one of the breed perform in a circus. He later lived with the family in the White House.

Rob Roy was immortalized in a Howard Chandler Christy portrait of Grace Coolidge. He died in 1928 after a short illness.

== Life and death ==
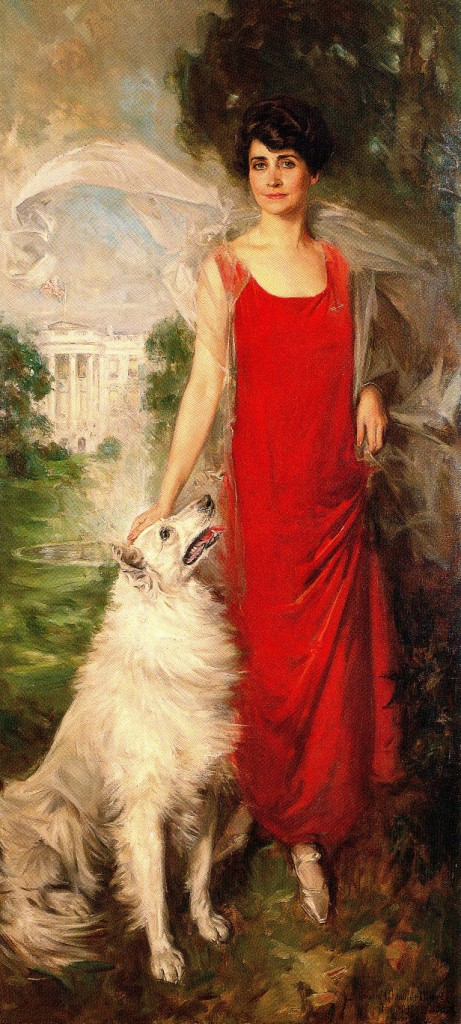
The Christy portrait of Rob Roy and Grace Coolidge

Rob Roy was acquired by Calvin Coolidge's wife, Grace Coolidge, in 1922 from Island White Kennels in Oshkosh, Wisconsin. Grace Coolidge had reportedly become enthralled by collies after seeing one of the breed perform in a circus. During the period in which the Coolidges owned Rob Roy, they also had a female collie named Prudence Prim. In 1928 Rob Roy became ill and was unsuccessfully treated at Walter Reed Army Medical Center, where he died. Upon his death Coolidge wistfully remarked,

His especial delight was to ride with me in the boats when I went fishing. So although I know he would bark for joy as the grim boatman ferried him across the dark waters of the Styx, yet his going left me lonely on the hither shore.

== Mannerisms ==
Rob Roy was known as Coolidge's favorite among a menagerie of pets he kept that included dogs, birds, cats, and raccoons. Coolidge himself described Rob Roy as a "stately gentleman of great courage and fidelity". Rob Roy was known to lead Coolidge to the Oval Office each morning in a stoic manner with gaze fixed forward. Rob Roy's stately characteristics aside, Coolidge frequently tried to trick the dog into chasing animals that appeared on screen during the showing of films at the White House. According to Harry Truman, Coolidge once ordered Senator Morris Sheppard to surrender his sausage to the dog while Coolidge and Sheppard were having a late lunch.

== Legacy ==
A portrait of Grace Coolidge by the American artist and illustrator Howard Chandler Christy, originally hung in the Red Room of the White House, shows the First Lady with Rob Roy. The dog's pose – a gaze directed toward Grace Coolidge – was achieved by feeding it candy from Coolidge's hand throughout the portrait sittings. The life-size painting is featured in the White House China Room today.

== See also ==
- List of individual dogs
- United States presidential pets
- Rob Roy MacGregor, namesake
