= Nanny and Nanko =

Goats owned by Abraham Lincoln

Nanny and Nanko were two goats that were presidential pets owned by Abraham Lincoln. Lincoln gifted the goats to his son, Tad Lincoln, who wanted a goat. Tad and his brother William Wallace Lincoln played with Nanny and Nanko inside and outside of the White House.

== Biography ==
In the 1860s, Lincoln shared his home with Nanny and Nanko. Sometimes, they chewed up the furniture of the White House. They grazed on the grounds of the White House. After Abraham Lincoln was assassinated, his widow Mary Todd Lincoln, gave the goats to a friend. According to Lincoln, they were the best and kindest goats in the world.
