= Barney (dog) =

Scottish Terrier, George W. Bush family pet

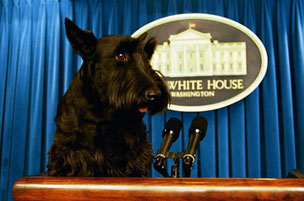
- Barney on the Presidential lectern
- Species: Canis familiaris
- Breed: Scottish Terrier
- Sex: Male
- Born: Bernard Bush; September 30, 2000; New Jersey, U.S.
- Died: February 1, 2013 (aged 12); Texas, U.S.
- Cause of death: Euthanasia
- Nationality: United States
- Notable role: Played self in Barney Cam I (2002); Barney Cam II: Barney Reloaded (2003); Barney and Spot's Winter Wonderland (2003); Barney Cam: Where in the White House is Miss Beazley? (2004)
- Known for: Pet of the First Family of the United States
- Title: First Dog of the United States
- Term: January 20, 2001 — January 20, 2009
- Predecessor: Buddy and Socks
- Successor: Bo and Sunny
- Owner: Bush family
- Parents: Coors, dam (of Pontefract; owned by Christine Todd Whitman); Kelly, sire (of Champion Motherwell Stormwarning)
- Appearance: Black fur
- Barney (archived)

Barney Bush (birth name Bernard Bush; September 30, 2000 – February 1, 2013) was a Scottish Terrier owned by former U.S. President George W. Bush and former First Lady Laura Bush. Barney had his own official web page which redirected to an extension of the White House website. Barney was born in New Jersey and he was often referred to as the "First Dog".

== Family ==
Barney's mother, Coors, was owned by former Environmental Protection Agency Director and former New Jersey Governor Christine Todd Whitman. The dog's father is known as Kelly. Miss Beazley, the Bushes' other Scottish terrier, is Barney's niece through his half-brother, Clinton.

== Interests ==
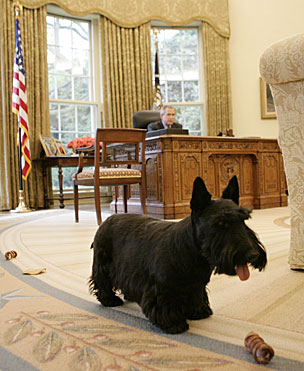
Barney at play in the Oval Office

Barney is said to have enjoyed playing with volleyballs and golf balls, and enjoyed observing games of horseshoes. There are various web sites across the Internet devoted to Barney. Most notably, he was the main star of the White House's annual Christmas videos during the Bush administration.

Barney was featured in several films that go by the name of Barneycam and are made by the White House Staff, and star both Barney himself and Miss Beazley, the other presidential canine. These movies can be found on the George W. Bush archived White House web site.

== Media attention ==
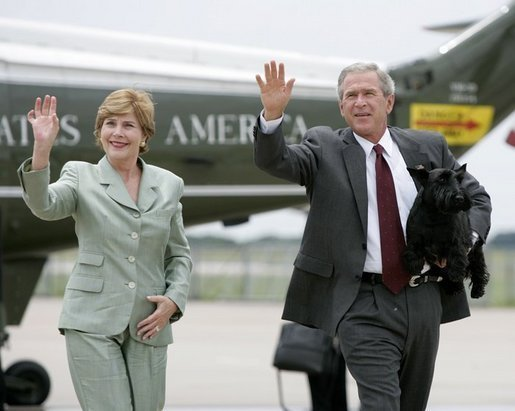
Laura, George and Barney at TSTC Waco Airport

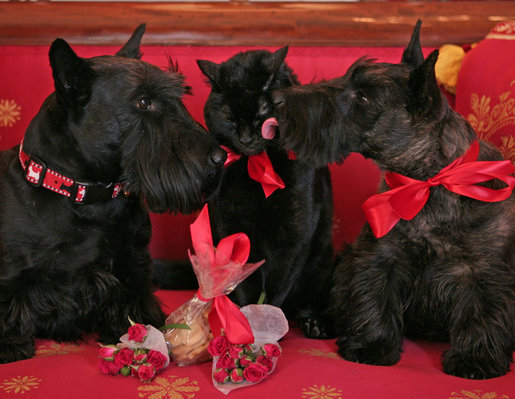
Barney watches as Miss Beazley gives a "kiss" to India on Valentine's Day 2007.

=== Bob Woodward quotes Bush about Barney ===
Barney was evoked in a famous Bush quote cited by Bob Woodward about the Iraq War in State of Denial: Bush at War, Part III (ISBN 0743272234) and repeated during a 60 Minutes interview:

"Late last year he had key Republicans up to the White House to talk about the war. And said, 'I will not withdraw even if Laura and Barney are the only ones supporting me.' Barney is his dog," Woodward says. "My work on this leads to lots of people who spend hours, days with the president."

=== Criticism by Karl Rove and Vladimir Putin ===
White House official Karl Rove remarked shortly after his resignation that Barney was "a lump." Barney has also been criticized by Russian president Vladimir Putin who feels a world leader should own large robust dogs, not smaller breeds such as the Scottish Terrier. At a later date, when Putin introduced Bush to Koni, his black Labrador Retriever, Putin is reported to have remarked that Koni is "(b)igger, tougher, stronger, faster, meaner, than Barney."

=== Satires ===
On November 27, 2006, Barney was featured in an article in satirical newspaper The Onion titled "Troop Morale Boosted By Surprise Visit From First Dog". The article described a fictitious visit by Barney to troops in Iraq.

On December 14, 2006, The Daily Show satirized Barney's Holiday Extravaganza. Barney was, at one point, satirized in The Bugle.

On January 23, 2007, Scottie Tails posted a satire video of a Wheaten-colored terrier named Kenzie asking Barney to contact her about a date.

In 2017 the German YouTube Channel RocketbeansTV started a tabletop role-playing game about animals preventing the 9/11 attacks. The final arc included a side quest kidnapping Barney from the White House to get media attention.

=== Bites ===
On November 6, 2008, Barney bit Reuters news reporter Jon Decker's finger. Barney had bitten Boston Celtics public relations director Heather Walker on the wrist on September 19, 2008, breaking the skin and drawing blood, but the incident was not reported until after the November 4 elections. Laura Bush's spokesperson joked afterwards that "I think it was his way of saying he was done with the paparazzi."

=== Death and legacy ===
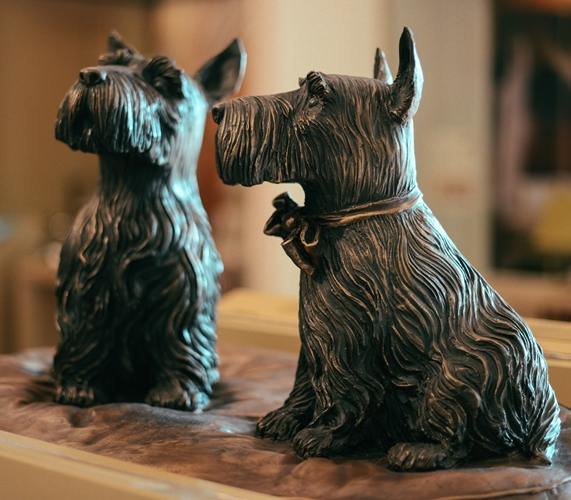
Bronze statues of Barney and Miss Beazley at the George W. Bush Presidential Center

On February 1, 2013, Barney was euthanized due to lymphoma. He was survived by the Bushes' other Scottish Terrier, Miss Beazley, who later died in 2014.

Barney and Miss Beazley are honored with a bronze sculpture at the George W. Bush Library. A bronze Barney also appears in the arms of Bush's statue in Rapid City, South Dakota's "City of Presidents" public art installation of presidential statues.

=== Filmography ===
Barney has starred in eleven government film productions. His last, Barney Cam VII: A Red, White and Blue Christmas, is a 2008 Christmas video featuring George W. Bush and members of his immediate family, and many American Olympians. In it, he dreams of winning several honors for the United States before being woken up by President Bush, who needs Barney's help in preparing for Christmas.

Barney's feature videos:

- Barney Cam VII: A Red, White and Blue Christmas (2008)
- Barney Cam VI: Holiday in the National Parks (2007)
- My Barney Valentine (2007)
- Barney's Holiday Extravaganza (2006)
- A Very Beazley Christmas (2005)
- Barney and Miss Beazley's Spring Garden Tour (2005)
- Barney has found Miss Beazley (2005)
- Where in the White House is Miss Beazley? (2004)
- Barney Reloaded (2003)
- Barney and Spot's Winter Wonderland (2003)
- Barney Cam (2002)

== See also ==
- India – President George W. Bush's cat
- Fala – Franklin D. Roosevelt's Scottish Terrier
- United States presidential pets
- List of individual dogs

Honorary titles
Preceded by Buddy; Bill Clinton's; Labrador Retriever	White House pet dog January 20, 2001–January 20, 2009; Served alongside: Miss Beazley (Since January 6, 2005) and Spot "Spotty" Fetcher	Succeeded by Bo; Barack Obama's; Portuguese Water Dog
