= Barbara Todd =

Barbara Todd may refer to:

- Barbara Feinman Todd, American journalist, ghostwriter, and lecturer
- Barbara Euphan Todd (1898–1976), English writer
