= It Takes a Village =

1996 book published by Hillary Clinton

It Takes a Village: And Other Lessons Children Teach Us
- Front cover
- Author: Hillary Clinton
- Language: English
- Publisher: Simon & Schuster
- Publication date: January 1996
- Media type: Print (hardcover)
- Pages: 352
- ISBN: 1-4165-4064-4
- OCLC: 76838574
- Dewey Decimal: 305.23/10973 22
- LC Class: HQ792.U5 C57 2006
- Followed by: Dear Socks, Dear Buddy: Kids' Letters to the First Pets (1998)

It Takes a Village: And Other Lessons Children Teach Us is a book published in 1996 by the then First Lady of the United States Hillary Clinton. In it, Clinton presents her vision for the children of America. She focuses on the impact individuals and groups outside the family have, for better or worse, on a child's well-being, and advocates a society which meets all of a child's needs. The book was written with uncredited ghostwriter Barbara Feinman.

The book was republished as a Tenth Anniversary Edition in 2006 and saw publication as a picture book in 2017.

== History ==
Publishers had approached Clinton since the spring of 1994 with the idea of writing a book, and announcement of the upcoming book came in April 1995 from the publisher she chose, Simon & Schuster. It came in the wake of the Clinton health care plan of 1993, which she had led the effort for and which had suffered its final collapse in September 1994, and the book was seen by some observers as an effort to help reshape Clinton's image. It was not unusual for a First Lady to write a book while still in office, with Barbara Bush's children-aimed Millie's Book the most recent prior example. Eleanor Roosevelt was the first First Lady to write books while still in office, with the publication of It's Up to the Women in 1933, This Troubled World in 1938, and The Moral Basis of Democracy in 1940, among others. Carolyn Reidy, head of Simon & Schuster's trade books division, said: "We have all known that Hillary Rodham Clinton has devoted most of her career to issues of children. But outside of a handful of articles and speeches, her thoughts on these issues have not been available to everyone in an easily readable format. I think it will be an inspiring book." The book was originally intended to come out in September 1995 but delays on the part of Clinton resulted in publication being delayed until January 1996.

It was stated that Clinton would take no payments from the writing other than those to cover expenses, and that royalties from the book's sales would go to charity. In January 1996, Clinton went on a ten-city book tour and made numerous television appearances to promote the book, although she was frequently hit with questions about her involvement in the Whitewater and Travelgate controversies. The book spent 18 weeks on the New York Times Best Seller List during 1996 including three weeks at number one. By 2000 it had sold 450,000 copies in hardcover and another 200,000 in paperback.

The theme of the book, at least as perceived from its title, aroused immediate opposition within the United States. A well known instance of this occurred during the 1996 presidential election when, during his acceptance speech at the Republican National Convention, Republican Party nominee Bob Dole said that with all due respect, I am here to tell you, it does not take a village to raise a child. It takes a family to raise a child." Criticism of Clinton's notion would continue to be made by American conservatives, including Rush Limbaugh, Andrea Tantaros, and Jonah Goldberg, through the next two decades.

In 1997, Clinton received a Grammy Award for Best Spoken Word Album for her audio recording of the book. The book appears in Clinton’s official First Lady portrait; this portrait was painted by Simmie Knox and unveiled in 2004. In it the book is depicted on a table next to a framed picture of the White House. In 2005, Senator Rick Santorum wrote a rebuttal to the book, It Takes a Family: Conservatism and the Common Good.

== Contents ==
- Introduction
- It Takes a Village
- No Family Is an Island
- Every Child Needs a Champion
- The Bell Curve Is a Curve Ball
- Kids Don't Come with Instructions
- The World Is in a Hurry, Children Are Not
- An Ounce of Prevention Is Worth a Pound of Intensive Care
- Security Takes More Than a Blanket
- The Best Tool You Can Give Your Child Is a Shovel
- Children Are Born Believers
- Childhood Can Be a Service Academy
- Kids Are an Equal Employment Opportunity
- Child Care Is Not a Spectator Sport
- Education = Expectations
- Seeing Is Believing
- Every Business Is a Family Business
- Children Are Citizens Too
- Let Us Build a Village Worthy of Our

== Synopsis ==
The book emphasizes the shared responsibility that society has for successfully raising children, by looking at a number of angles as indicated in the chapter titles noted above. Clinton describes herself in the book as a Moderate, which is evidenced by a combination of advocating for government-driven social reforms while also espousing conservative values. Clinton observes in the book many institutions responsible in some way for raising children, including: direct family, grandparents, neighbors, teachers, ministers, doctors, employers, politicians, nonprofits, faith communities, businesses, and international governmental groups. Some of the goals and institutions that Clinton advocates for in the book include: the Family and Medical Leave Act of 1993, the Violent Crime Control and Law Enforcement Act, Community Policing, the Brady Bill, Amber alerts, immunizations, State Children's Health Insurance Program, financial regulation, expanded Child Tax Credits, Minimum Wage increases, Universal health care, personal responsibility, uniforms in schools, Goals 2000 academic framework, music warning labels, sexual abstinence, Plan B contraception, family planning, and marriage.

== Proverb question ==
The book's title is attributed to the African proverb "It takes a village to raise a child". The saying and its attribution as an "African" proverb were in circulation before it was adopted by Clinton as the source for the title of her book. The saying previously provided the source for the title of a children's book entitled It Takes a Village by Jane Cowen-Fletcher, published in 1994.

The authenticity of the proverb is debatable as there is no evidence that this precise proverb genuinely originated with any African culture. Wolfgang Mieder, the dean of international proverb scholarship, searched for a genuine African source for this proverb, but was not able to identify any specific proverb that matched this translation.

However, numerous proverbs from different cultures across Africa have been noted that convey similar sentiments in different ways. As one poster on the scholarly list H-Net wrote, "While it is interesting to seek provenance in regard to the proverb, 'It takes a village to raise a child,' I think it would be misleading to ascribe its origin to a single source.... Let me give a few examples of African societies with proverbs which translate to 'It takes a village...': In Lunyoro (Banyoro) there is a proverb that says 'Omwana takulila nju emoi,' whose literal translation is 'A child does not grow up only in a single home.' In Kihaya (Bahaya) there is a saying, 'Omwana taba womoi,' which translates as 'A child belongs not to one parent or home.' In Kijita (Wajita) there is a proverb which says 'Omwana ni wa bhone,' meaning regardless of a child's biological parent(s) its upbringing belongs to the community. In Swahili, the proverb 'Asiyefunzwa na mamae hufunzwa na ulimwengu' approximates to the same."

In 2016, NPR decided to research the origins of the proverb, and concluded it was unable to pinpoint its origins but agreed with the H-Net discussion regarding it holding the true spirits of some African cultures. It was part of a class of such-attributed sayings, with one observer stating, "If someone starts an aphorism with 'there's an African saying' it's probably a mythical quote misattributed to a whole continent." NPR itself concluded, "What we found is that it takes a lot of phone calls to track down the origins of a proverb. And in the end, the answer might be: We just don't know."

== Ghostwriter controversy ==
Clinton has been criticized for not giving credit to a ghostwriter in connection with It Takes a Village. The majority of the book was reportedly written by ghostwriter Barbara Feinman. When the book was first announced in April 1995, The New York Times reported publisher Simon & Schuster as saying "The book will actually be written by Barbara Feinman, a journalism professor at Georgetown University in Washington. Ms. Feinman will conduct a series of interviews with Mrs. Clinton, who will help edit the resulting text."

Feinman spent seven months on the project and was paid $120,000 for her work. Feinman, however, was not mentioned anywhere in the book. Clinton's acknowledgment section began: "It takes a village to bring a book into the world, as everyone who has written one knows. Many people have helped me to complete this one, sometimes without even knowing it. They are so numerous that I will not even attempt to acknowledge them individually, for fear that I might leave one out." During her promotional tour for the book, Clinton said, "I actually wrote the book ... I had to write my own book because I want to stand by every word." Clinton stated that Feinman assisted in interviews and did some editorial drafting of "connecting paragraphs", while Clinton herself wrote the final manuscript in longhand.

This led Feinman to complain at the time to Capitol Style magazine over the lack of acknowledgement. In 2001, The Wall Street Journal reported that "New York literary circles are buzzing with vitriol over Sen. Clinton's refusal, so far, to share credit with any writer who helps on her book." Later, in a 2002 article for The Writer's Chronicle, Barbara Feinman Todd (now using her married name) related that the project with Clinton had gone smoothly, producing drafts in a round-robin style. Feinman agrees that Clinton was involved with the project, but also states that, "Like any first lady, Mrs. Clinton had an extremely hectic schedule and writing a book without assistance would have been logistically impossible." Feinman reiterates that her only objection to the whole process was the lack of any acknowledgement. A 2005 Georgetown University web page bio for Barbara Feinman Todd states that It Takes a Village was one of "several high-profile books" that she has "assisted, as editor, writer and researcher." Feinman Todd wrote more about the collaboration in her 2017 memoir Pretend I'm Not Here.

== Tenth anniversary edition ==
In 2006, It Takes a Village was republished as a 10th Anniversary Edition with a new cover design and a new Introduction by the author that reflected on the continued meaning of the book in the Internet era and following the September 11 attacks. It also includes a new Notes section at the end that provides updates for scholarly studies that had been conducted in the intervening ten years. The role of Feinman remains unmentioned. Clinton did not shy away from the book's conclusions during her post-First Lady political career. As part of her own presidential campaign during 2007, she said "I still believe it takes a village to raise a child." And in her second presidential campaign during 2015 she said "Fundamentally, [Republicans] reject what it takes to build an inclusive economy. It takes an inclusive society. What I once called 'a village' that has a place for everyone."

== Picture book ==
It Takes a Village
- Front cover
- Author: Hillary Rodham Clinton
- Illustrator: Marla Frazee
- Language: English
- Genre: Children's literature
- Publisher: Simon & Schuster
- Publication date: September 12, 2017
- Media type: Print (Hardcover)
- Pages: 40
- ISBN: 1-4814-3087-4

The year 2017 saw public efforts under way to render It Takes as a picture book, an announcement that was made in February 2017. It was also announced that Marla Frazee, a two-time winner of the Caldecott Medal, would be the illustrator for the picture book; Frazee said in a statement, "I am deeply honored to help bring Hillary Clinton's life's work and devotion to public service, which has inspired me and millions of others, to children and those who love them." As with the original book, any net proceeds from the picture book would go to charity. Clinton had entertained the notion of doing this for a number of years, and worked on it with Frazee during her 2016 presidential election campaign. The result was published on September 12, 2017, also the same day of publication as that for her account of her devastating loss in that election, What Happened.

The book is aimed at preschool-aged children, although a few messages are more likely understood by adults, and contains some 117 words. The Washington Post characterized the work thusly: "It captures perfectly Clinton's vision of a multicultural America working toward a constructive goal. So hopeful and forward-looking, the book might even be called 'What Didn't Happen.'"

A review of the book in the industry publication Shelf Awareness said that the picture book took a somewhat different perspective from the original, focusing more on the actions of children than of adults. The review especially praised the art work, saying that "As with all of her works, Frazee's illustrations explode with life ... Her pencil-and-watercolor art is vibrant and action-packed, the story told entirely through her illustrations of the everyday ups and downs of the people working together to create something new and beautiful."

== In popular culture ==
The book is parodied in Tim Wilson's 1999 song "It Takes a Village to Raise a Nut".
