= TSTC Waco Airport =

Airport in Texas

TSTC Waco Airport (formerly James Connally AFB)
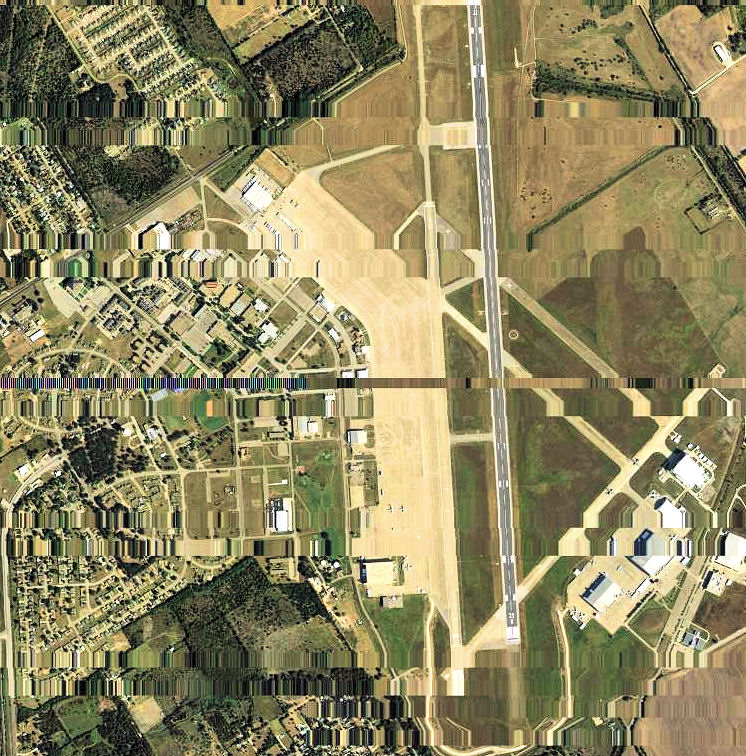
- USGS 2006 orthophoto
- IATA: CNW; ICAO: KCNW; FAA LID: CNW

Summary
- Airport type: Public
- Owner: Texas State Technical College
- Serves: Waco, Texas
- Elevation AMSL: 470 ft (140 m)
- Coordinates: 31°38′16″N 097°04′27″W

Map
- Location of airport in Texas

Runways
Direction	Length		Surface
Direction	ft	m	Surface
17L/35R	8,600	2,621	Asphalt
17R/35L	6,291	1,917	Concrete

Statistics (2022)
- Aircraft operations: 57,138
- Based aircraft: 28
- Source: Federal Aviation Administration

TSTC Waco Airport (IATA: CNW, ICAO: KCNW, FAA LID: CNW) is a public use airport located eight nautical miles (9 mi, 15 km) northeast of the central business district of Waco, a city in McLennan County, Texas, United States. Before 1968, it was known as James Connally Air Force Base. The airport is owned by Texas State Technical College. It is included in the National Plan of Integrated Airport Systems for 2021–2025, which categorized it as a general aviation facility.

The facility is currently used as an industrial airpark operated by Texas State Technical College System for their aviation programs, and is noted for being the largest airport in the United States owned by an educational institution.

== History ==
=== Military Use ===
The airport opened May 5, 1942, as Waco Army Air Field and was the headquarters of the Army Air Force Central Instructors' School during World War II. It was deactivated after the war in 1945 but was reactivated in 1948 as a pilot training base under the Air Training Command. It was named for Colonel James T. Connally who had been killed in Japan in 1945. The airport was initially called Connally Air Force Base but the name evolved to also include his first name.

In 1957, the base became a support facility for the headquarters of Twelfth Air Force (12 AF) located in nearby Waco and concurrently concentrated on providing navigator flight training under the cognizance of the Air Training Command.

In 1968, as part of a nationwide reduction in air force bases and naval air stations to stay within congressional funding limits while continuing to prosecute the war in Vietnam, James Connally AFB was closed. All navigator training was consolidated at Mather Air Force Base, California, and the 12th Air Force was relocated to Bergstrom Air Force Base in Austin, Texas. At this point, the facility was conveyed to the State of Texas by the General Services Administration (GSA).

=== Civilian Use ===
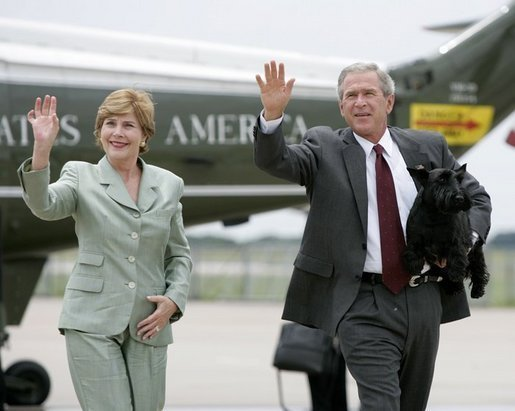
George W. Bush, Laura Bush, and Barney at the airport

The airport and the base facilities were used as a technical school while General Dynamics remained as a tenant performing modification work on various military aircraft. The General Dynamics facility was later closed.

Electrospace Systems opened a hangar at the facility; its operations were later sold to Chrysler and renamed Chrysler Technologies Airborne Systems. Chrysler subsequently sold the operation to Raytheon which renamed the facility Raytheon Aircraft Integration Systems. In 2002, Raytheon sold the facility to L-3 Communications and it is currently known as L-3 Communications Platform Integration Division.

During his presidency, George W. Bush flew in and out of the airport on Air Force One during visits to his home at the Prairie Chapel Ranch. On these trips, the president would typically fly on a Boeing VC-137 (until its retirement in 2001) or a C-32, due to the minimum runway length requirements of the primary presidential transport aircraft, the VC-25.

In 1991, TSTI was renamed Texas State Technical College (TSTC).

== Facilities and aircraft ==
TSTC Waco Airport covers an area of 2,200 acres (890 ha) at an elevation of 470 feet (143 m) above mean sea level. It has two runways: 17L/35R is 8,600 by 150 feet (2,621 x 46 m) with an asphalt surface; 17R/35L is 6,291 by 80 feet (1,917 x 23 m) with a concrete surface.

For the 12-month period ending December 31, 2022, the airport had 57,138 aircraft operations, an average of 156 per day: 75% general aviation, 24% military, 1% air taxi, and <1% commercial. At that time, there were 28 aircraft based at this airport: 22 single-engine, 2 multi-engine, and 4 helicopter.

== See also ==
- List of American Balloon Squadrons
- List of airports in Texas
