= Willow (cat) =

Pet cat owned by the Biden family

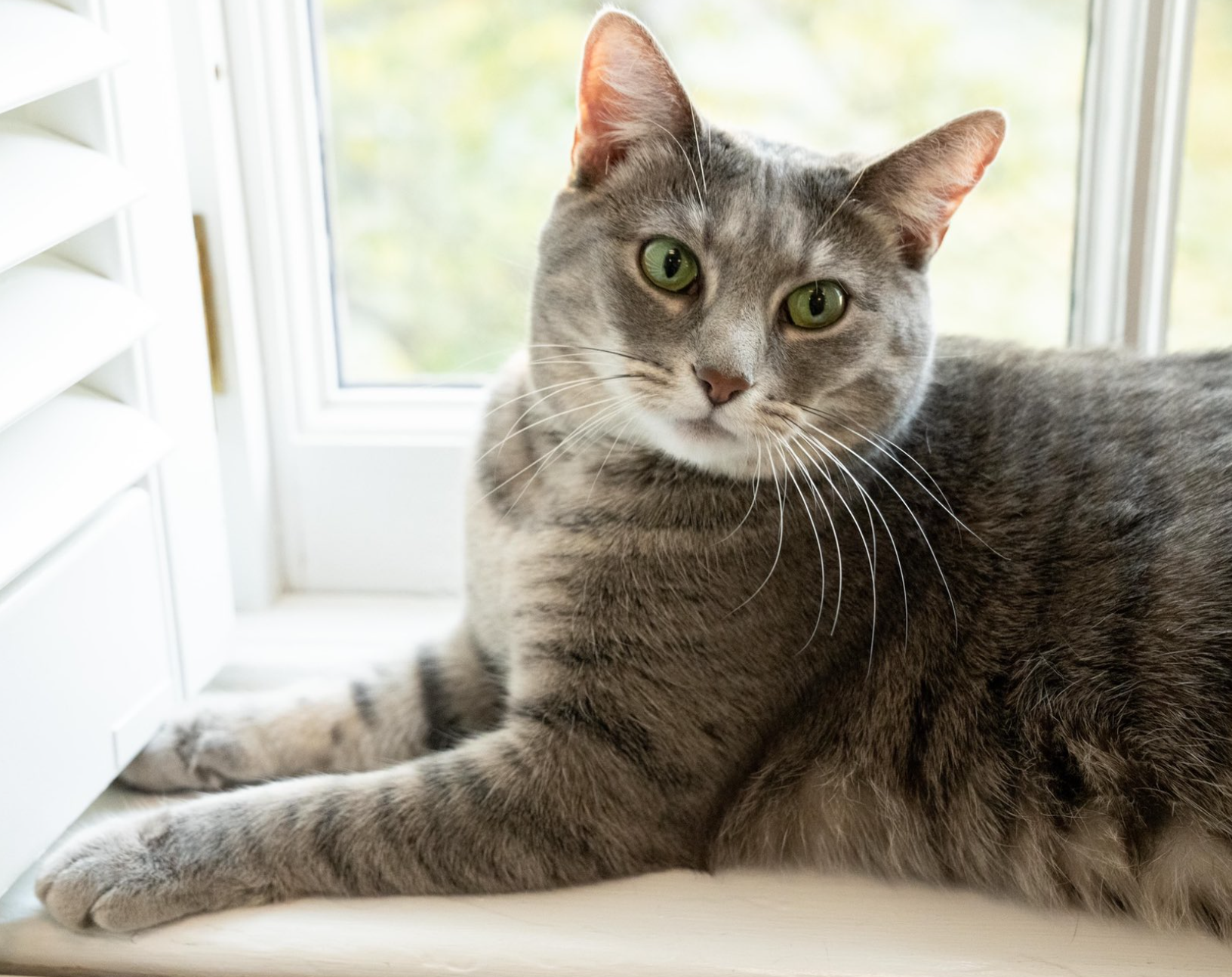
- Willow in 2022
- Species: Domestic cat
- Breed: Domestic short-haired cat
- Sex: Female
- Born: January 3, 2020 (age 6); Western Pennsylvania, U.S.
- Occupation: Former United States presidential pet, First Cat of the United States
- Years active: 2021–2025
- Term: January 28, 2022 – January 20, 2025
- Predecessor: India
- Owner: Biden family
- Appearance: Tabby cat with light green eyes, striped light and dark grey fur
- Named after: Willow Grove, Pennsylvania

Willow (born January 3, 2020) is an American tabby domestic short-haired cat owned by former president Joe Biden and first lady Jill Biden. Formerly a farm cat, she was adopted by the Biden family from Rick Telesz as part of a campaign promise to adopt a cat into the First Family and is named after Jill Biden's hometown of Willow Grove, Pennsylvania. Willow is the first cat to live in the White House since India, who was owned by President George W. Bush and First Lady Laura Bush.

== Biography ==
Willow is a former farm cat that was born in Western Pennsylvania, and was formerly owned by Rick Telesz, a farmer in Volant, Lawrence County, Pennsylvania. She has green eyes. Biden has stated that "[Willow] has no limits" and that "in the middle of the night she climbs up and lays on top of [his] head".

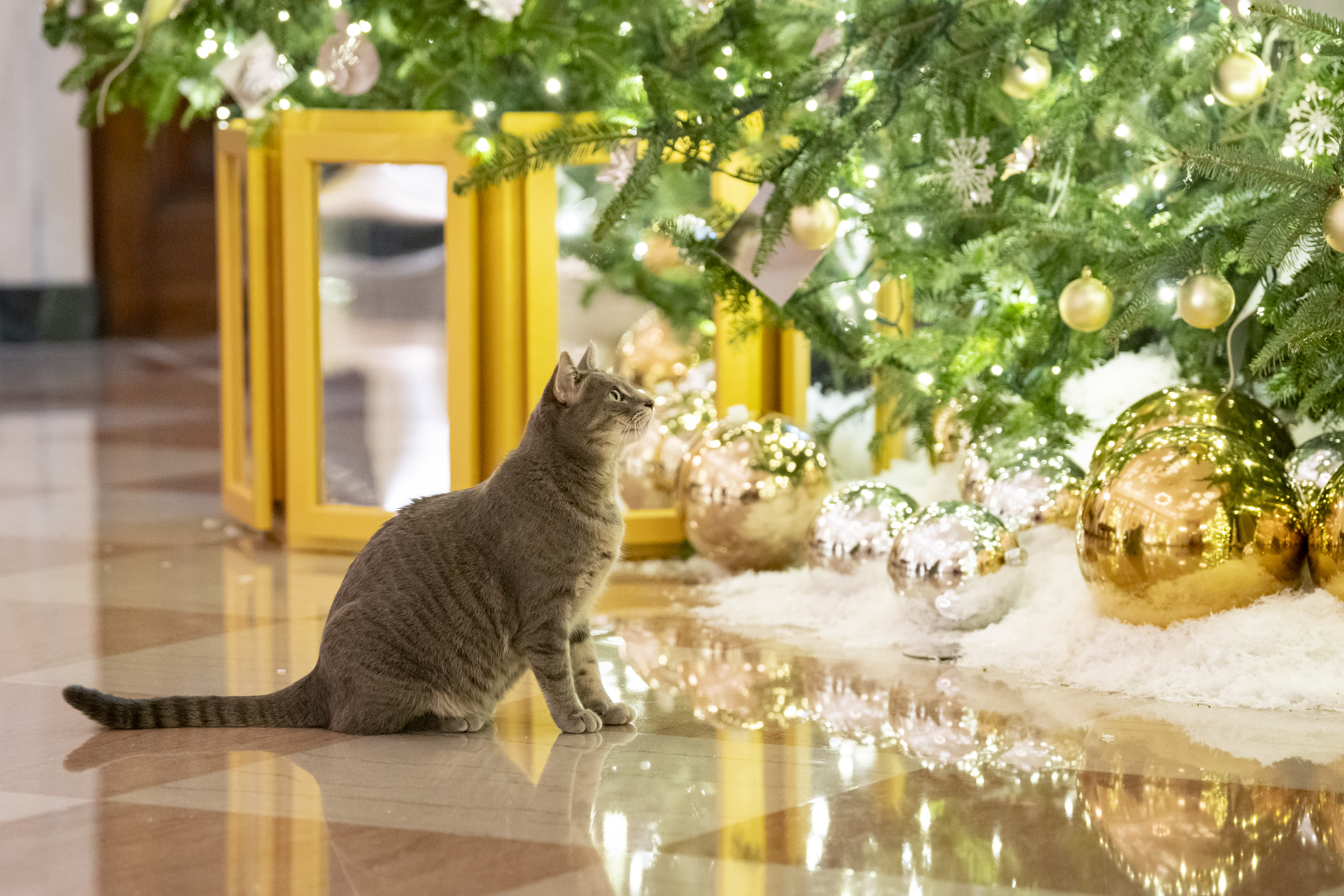
Willow overlooking Christmas decorations in the White House Cross Hall on December 22, 2022

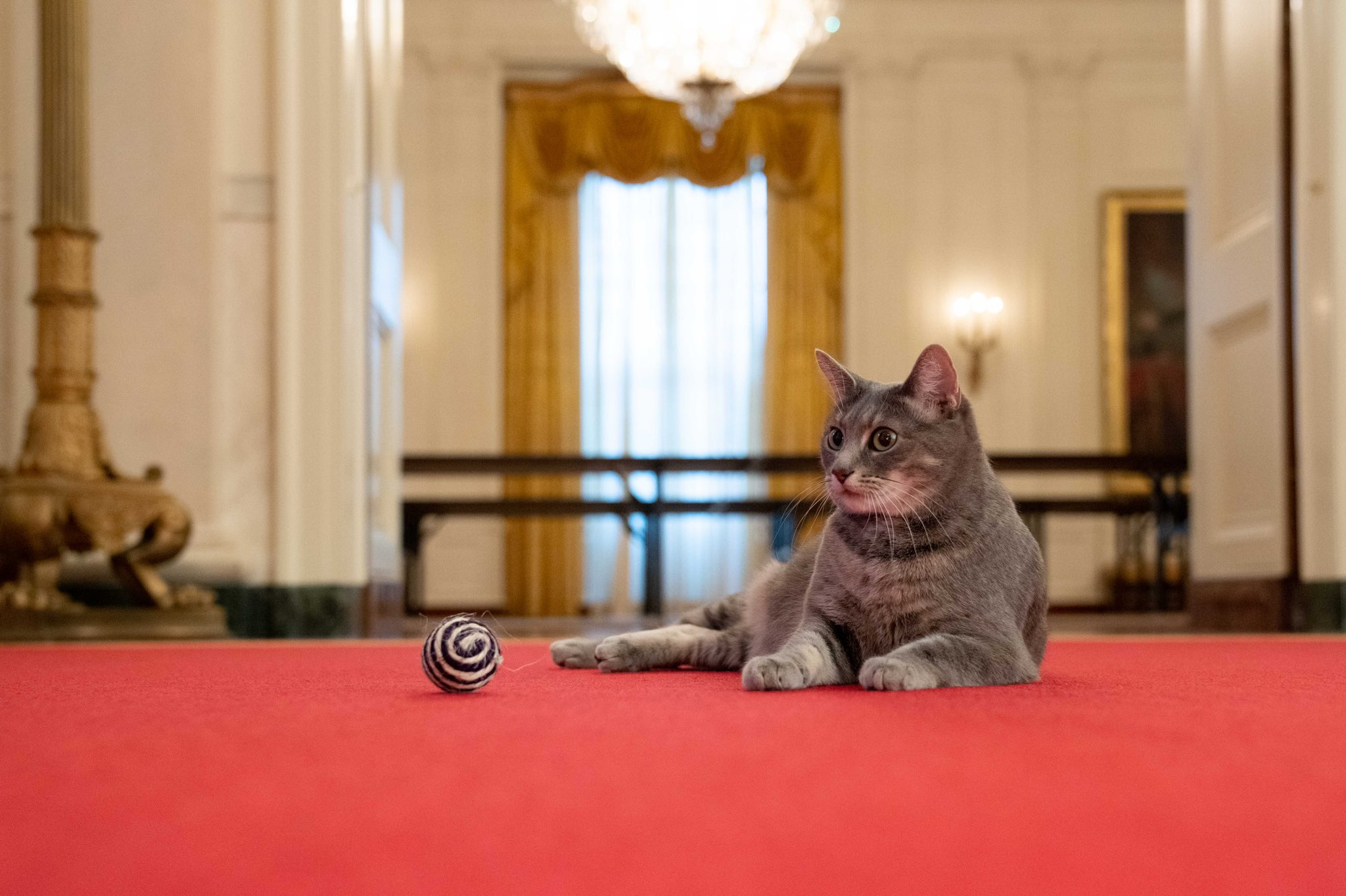
Willow in the White House.

Jill Biden first met Willow during a campaign speech at the farm where she resided and she immediately bonded with her. In an interview Jill stated that the cat had, between then and her adoption by the Bidens, been living with a foster family, and that she had grown attached to the cat. Rick Telesz, Willow's former owner, claimed that he received a phone call where he was informed that Jill wanted to adopt Willow from him.

Willow's adoption was part of a campaign promise to adopt a cat into the First Family, and after being so, was named Willow Biden, after Jill's hometown of Willow Grove, Pennsylvania.

Willow was adopted in February 2021, but only came to live in the White House in 2022 because of concerns that she would not get along with the Biden family's German Shepherd Major, and lived with Jill Biden's press secretary Michael LaRosa for a time. Her arrival was announced in January 2022 after much previous speculation. The dog reportedly had biting issues and was sent to live with friends of the Biden family in Delaware.

Willow is the subject of a picture book written by Jill Biden in 2024.

== See also ==
- United States presidential pets
- List of individual cats
- Larry

Honorary titles
Preceded by India (George W. Bush's black cat) (January 4, 2009)	United States presidential cat January 28, 2022 – January 20, 2025	Succeeded by vacant
