= C. Fred's Story =

1984 children's book by Barbara Bush

C. Fred's Story: A Dog's Life
- Author: Barbara Bush
- Published: 1984

C. Fred's Story: A Dog's Life is a 1984 children's book by then Second Lady of the United States Barbara Bush recounting the adventures of her and her husband George H. W. Bush's pet spaniel, C. Fred. named after their longtime friend and George’s business partner C. Fred Chambers The book was published by Doubleday and was reprinted ten times. Writer Bob Greene described the book as "one of the major titles on the spring list of Doubleday and Company".

George Bush was vice president of the United States at the time of the book's publication and the dog recounts Bush's career as he moved from Washington D.C. to China to Houston, Texas and back to Washington.

Historian Katherine A.S. Sibley wrote that the book has been interpreted as a "subtle way to get to know the second family" in addition to supporting Barbara Bush's activism in advancing childhood literacy. George H. W. Bush's biographer Curt Smith wrote that the book cast Barbara Bush in a "sympathetic, down-home, dog and child loving light" and that it led to a "bond over the next third of a century between Mrs. Bush and America that was improbable, even phenomenal".

== See also ==
- Millie's Book (1990)
- Dear Socks, Dear Buddy (1998)
- Marlon Bundo's A Day in the Life of the Vice President (2018)
