= India (cat) =

Cat owned by US presidential Bush family

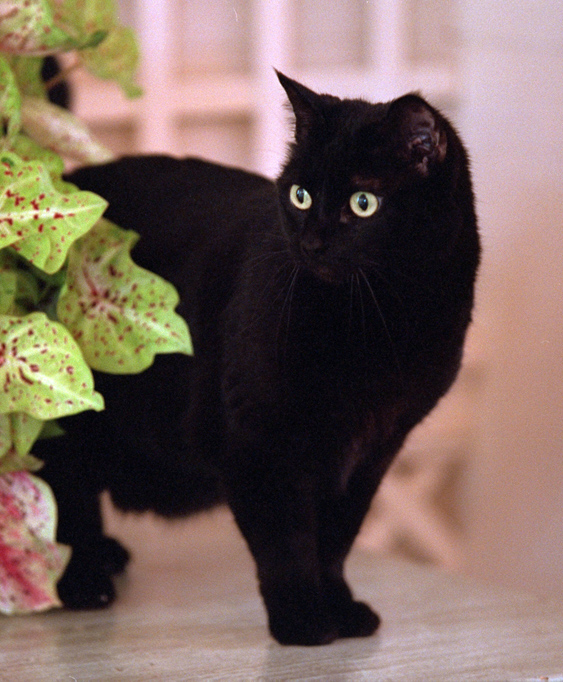
- India in 2001
- Species: Cat
- Breed: American Shorthair
- Sex: Female
- Born: July 13, 1990
- Died: January 4, 2009 (aged 18); White House, Washington, D.C., U.S.
- Predecessor: Socks
- Successor: Willow
- Owners: George W. Bush and Laura Bush
- Named after: Rubén Sierra

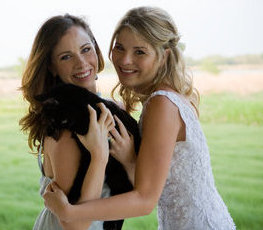
Barbara and Jenna Bush with India, 2008

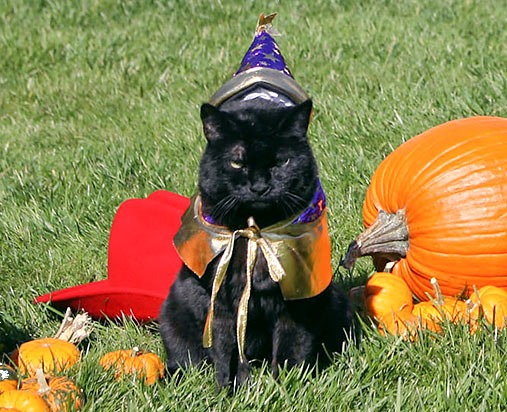
India the Cat in a Halloween costume, 2007

India "Willie" Bush (July 13, 1990 – January 4, 2009) was a female solid black American Shorthair cat owned by former U.S. President George W. Bush and First Lady Laura Bush. She lived with the Bush family for almost two decades.

== Biography ==
The Bushes acquired India, a solid black, female American Shorthair, in late 1991 or 1992 when their twin daughters Barbara and Jenna Bush were nine years old. India remained with George and Laura Bush once their daughters left for college. The cat moved with the Bushes to the White House from the Texas Governor's Mansion in Austin in early 2001 following Bush's inauguration as president.

Despite living at the White House with the First Family, India was overshadowed in the media by the Bushes' higher-profile Scottish Terriers, Barney and Miss Beazley. However, she was seen in the "Barneycam" videos produced by the White House staff around Christmas time, her first appearance being Where in the White House is Miss Beazley?, where she was referred to as "Willie". The dogs received significantly more media attention from the White House press corps during the Bush presidency.

India made an appearance, again as "Willie", in the March 2008 Architectural Digest in the East Sitting Hall of the White House.

India died at the White House at the age of 18 on January 4, 2009, just 16 days before Bush finished his presidency. In a press release, a spokesperson for the First Lady said that the family was "deeply saddened by their cat's death", and went on to say "India was a beloved member of the Bush family for almost two decades. She will be greatly missed."

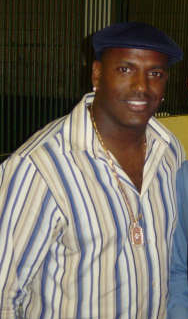
The cat's namesake was Texas Ranger Rubén "El Indio" Sierra, who was with the club when George W. Bush was the principal owner of the baseball club.

== Controversy in India ==
There was some controversy reported in India as some people were upset with the cat's name. In July 2004, demonstrators in the city of Thiruvananthapuram in Kerala denounced the cat's name as an insult to the nation of India, and burned an effigy of President Bush in protest. The Bushes did not change the cat's name in response to the demonstrations, as their cat had been named after the baseball player Rubén Sierra, who was nicknamed "El Indio" during his time with the Texas Rangers when Bush owned the team. The name "India" had reportedly been given to the family cat by their daughter Barbara.

== See also ==
- United States presidential pets
- List of individual cats

Honorary titles
Preceded by Socks (Bill Clinton’s tuxedo cat)	United States presidential cat January 20, 2001 – January 4, 2009	Succeeded by Willow (Joe Biden's short-haired tabby) (January 28, 2022)
