= It takes a village =

Proverb about raising children

"It takes a village to raise a child" is a proverb that means that an entire community of people must provide for and interact positively with children for those children to experience and grow in a safe and healthy environment.

== Attributions ==
The proverb is of unknown origin. In 2016, National Public Radio researched the origin of the proverb but was unable to pinpoint them, although some academics said the proverb embodies the spirit of several African cultures. The Dictionary of Modern Proverbs found no evidence of African origin of the proverb outside of some general sayings regarding communal cooperation.

== In book titles ==
- It Takes a Village by Jane Cowen-Fletcher, published in 1994
- It Takes a Village: And Other Lessons Children Teach Us, by Hillary Clinton, published in 1996
