= Betty Currie =

American government official

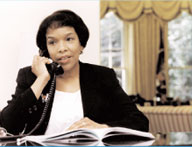
- Currie in 1999

Personal Secretary to the President
- In office January 20, 1993 – January 20, 2001
- President: Bill Clinton
- Preceded by: Patty Presock
- Succeeded by: Ashley Estes

Personal details
- Born: Betty Grace Williams; November 10, 1939 (age 86) Edwards, Mississippi, U.S.
- Party: Democratic
- Spouse: Bob Currie

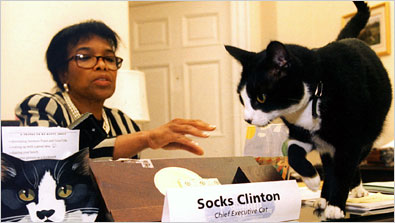
Currie with the Clintons' cat Socks

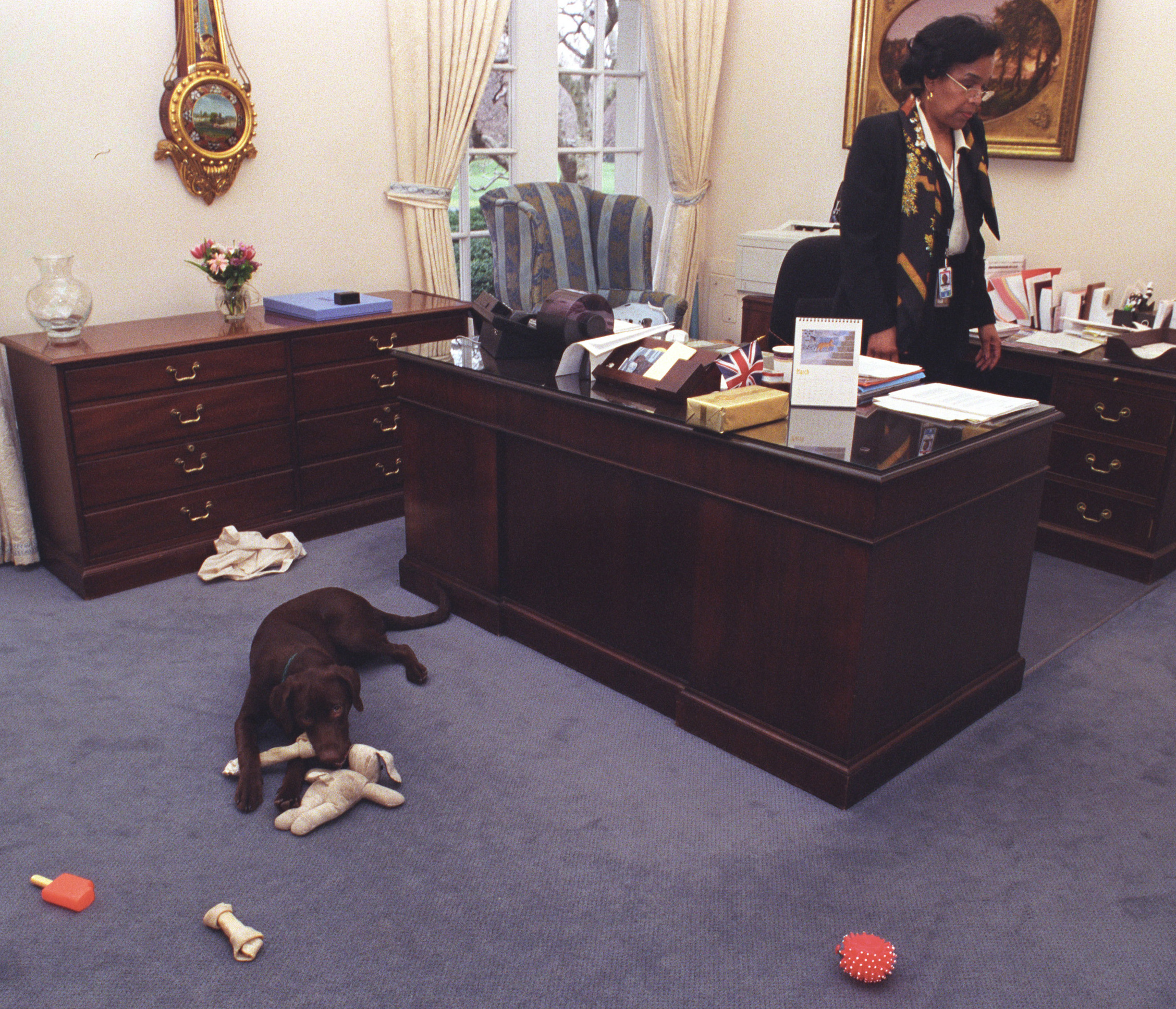
The Clintons' dog Buddy plays in-front of Currie's desk in 1998.

Betty Grace Currie (née Williams; born November 10, 1939) is an American government official who served as the personal secretary for Bill Clinton during his tenure as president of the United States. She became well known as a figure in the Lewinsky scandal for her alleged handling of gifts given to Monica Lewinsky by President Clinton.

== Early life and education ==
Currie was born in Edwards, Mississippi, and moved to Waukegan, Illinois, as a child. She graduated from Waukegan High School.

== Career ==
After leaving high school, she worked in the clerical field at the Naval Station Great Lakes in Illinois. She later moved to Washington, D.C., and worked at the United States Department of the Navy, the United States Postal Service, United States Agency for International Development, Peace Corps, and the United States Department of Health and Human Services.

Currie's rise in the government bureaucracy began when Joseph Blatchford became Peace Corps director in 1969 and needed a new secretary. "The job was a crucial one. It had 10,000 people spread out over 68 countries, and I needed a reliable, efficient person," he says. "I didn't ask if she was a Republican or Democrat. I wasn't interested because she was so good." Currie stayed with Blatchford when he moved to ACTION, the federal agency that ran the Peace Corps, and she stayed there through three directors, Blatchford, Balzano, and Brown. Her association with the Peace Corps has continued with her appointment to the board of directors of the National Peace Corps Association in 2006.

After initially retiring from government service, she met John Podesta, who encouraged her to return in 1984 to run offices for the Walter Mondale 1984 presidential campaign and Michael Dukakis 1988 presidential campaign. She later joined the Clinton campaign, where she worked with James Carville in the "War Room" in Little Rock, Arkansas.

After Clinton's election to the presidency, Currie served as his personal secretary during both of his terms. She still keeps in touch with the Clinton family, and donated $750 to the Hillary Clinton 2008 presidential campaign.

=== Lewinsky scandal ===
Currie testified in front of the grand jury responsible for the perjury investigation in relation to Clinton's statement in the Paula Jones case. Currie testified on January 28, May 7, and May 14, 1998. Lewinsky had testified that Currie had arranged a meeting at Lewinsky's apartment to pick up gifts given to her by Clinton, showed up at her Watergate apartment and said, "I believe you have something for me." Currie denied this charge and claimed that Lewinsky had arranged the meeting. Regardless of who instigated the meeting, Currie took the gifts in question home and stored them under her bed. The gifts included, among other things, a hat pin, two brooches, a blanket, a marble bear figurine, T-shirt from Martha's Vineyard, and Walt Whitman's Leaves of Grass; the poetry book was of interest as Bill had given a copy to Hillary also. Lewinsky gave Clinton about 30 gifts. The gifts were picked up after Jones' lawyers had subpoenaed them.

It was also revealed that Currie had asked Clinton's friend Vernon Jordan to help Lewinsky find a job in New York on December 8, 1997.

Currie also testified that Clinton had recently called her in to work on a Sunday, on January 18, 1998, and pointedly said to her, regarding Lewinsky and himself, "We were never alone, right?" among other leading questions. This, added to similar incidents involving other potential witnesses, led to Clinton's subsequent impeachment charge of obstruction of justice.

Currie was not one of the four witnesses who gave video depositions during the Senate trial. During the scandal, it was also reported by The Washington Post that Currie was receiving spiritual counseling from Jesse Jackson.

Currie was portrayed by Rae Dawn Chong in Impeachment: American Crime Story.

=== Later career ===
She was appointed to the Alcohol Beverage Board of St. Mary's County Maryland, serving at her first meeting on April 10, 2008.

In December 2008, Currie returned to Washington, answering phones for the co-chairman of President-elect Barack Obama's transition, John Podesta.

== Personal life ==
Currie has retired and lived in St. Mary's County, Maryland, with her husband Robert Currie until he passed away in 2023. She has since moved back to Arlington, Virginia. She has a grown daughter. Socks, Chelsea Clinton's White House cat, lived with her from the time she left the White House after President Clinton finished his presidential run in 2001, remaining for eight years until he was euthanized after a long battle with cancer in February 2009.
