= Dear Socks, Dear Buddy =

1998 children's book by Hillary Clinton

Dear Socks, Dear Buddy: Kids' Letters to the First Pets
- Author: Hillary Rodham Clinton
- Language: English
- Publisher: Simon & Schuster
- Publication date: November 17, 1998
- Media type: Print (Hardcover)
- Pages: 208
- ISBN: 0-684-85778-2
- Preceded by: It Takes a Village: And Other Lessons Children Teach Us (1996)
- Followed by: An Invitation to the White House: At Home with History (2000)

Dear Socks, Dear Buddy: Kids' Letters to the First Pets is a 1998 children's book written by First Lady of the United States Hillary Rodham Clinton. It concerns the two pets that lived in the White House during the Clinton administration, Socks the cat and Buddy the dog.

== Description ==
The book includes more than 50 letters written to the First Pets by children and more than 80 photographs of Socks and Buddy. Examples of questions that letters asked include, "Who do you like best? Mr. Clinton? Mrs. Clinton or Chelsea?" and, "How do you like being a dog, Buddy? I like being a person." Socks was also asked if he was allowed to watch MTV and Buddy was asked if he ever got petted by the Spice Girls.

The book also includes several sections of text by Clinton discussing the two pets' habits, as well as the rivalry between them. Clinton also provided a history of the previous pets that had lived in the White House. The text also dispensed some advice on caring for pets and told parents to encourage children to express themselves through writing.

The last chapter of the book is titled "A Note on Saving America's Parks and Treasures".

== History ==
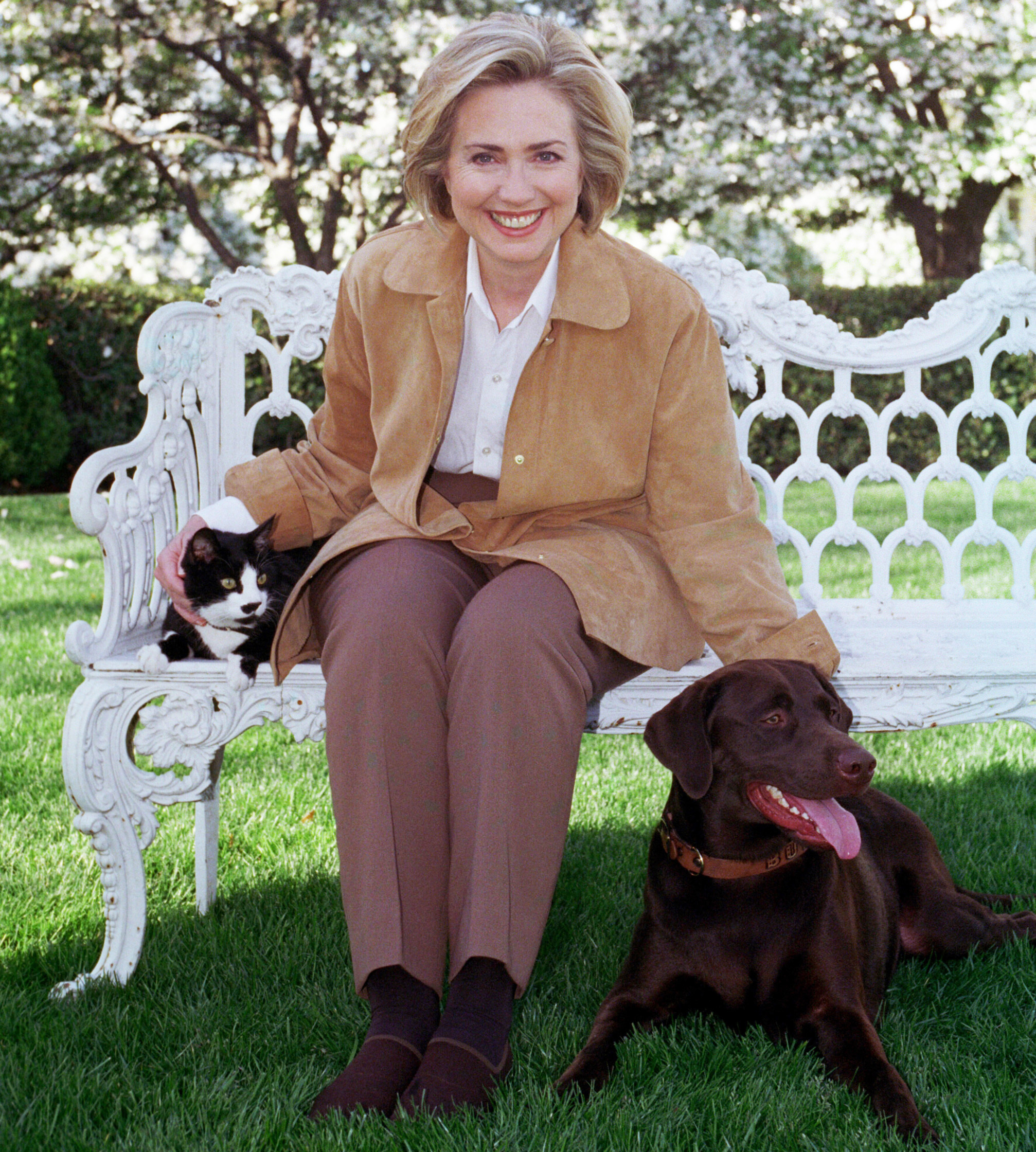
The First Lady with Socks and Buddy in 1999

The idea for the book originated with Clinton's publisher, Simon & Schuster, who were interested in a follow-up to Clinton's best-selling 1996 volume It Takes a Village. It also followed prior First Lady Barbara Bush's popular 1990 effort Millie's Book, about the prior White House dog. Plans for Dear Socks, Dear Buddy were announced in June 1998 and it was stated that Linda Kulman, a reporter based in Washington, would assist Clinton in the writing. Book magazine would subsequently characterize Kulman's role as that of a ghostwriter. However, in his memoir Even This I Get To Experience, Norman Lear, who Bill Clinton has acknowledged he had been of friend of since 1981, alleged that he and his son Ben wrote the book and that it was a product of them putting "our imaginations together;" However, this claim is unverified, with Kulman also acknowledged to be Hillary's collaborator on the book in a June 1998 Los Angeles Times article.

The book had a first printing put at somewhere between 400,000 and 500,000 copies. Its actual sales were around 350,000 copies. The book did not sell as well as It Takes a Village had, in part because the nature of the book was different and in part because Clinton did not engage in the same level of promotional activity for it. The book came out as the Lewinsky scandal turned into the impeachment of Bill Clinton, which contributed to Clinton's lessened effort in promoting the book.

== Proceeds ==
Clinton received no advance for writing the book. All of her proceeds from book sales and related publishing rights were donated to the National Park Foundation, the official charity of America's National Park Service. The publisher said it would donate some of its proceeds to the foundation as well.

The foundation was given possession of the copyright to the book, which simplified the tax aspects related to awarding profits to the foundation, thus eliminating some complexities that Clinton had encountered in donating the proceeds of It Takes a Village.

== See also ==
- C. Fred's Story (1984)
- Millie's Book (1990)
- Marlon Bundo's A Day in the Life of the Vice President (2018)
