= Socks the Cat Rocks the Hill =

SNES video game

- Preliminary cover art featuring Bill Clinton and Socks
- Developer: Realtime Associates
- Publishers: Kaneko (1993, Cancelled); Second Dimension (2018)
- Platforms: Super NES; Sega Genesis
- Release: Super NES: WW: February 1, 2018
- Genre: Platforming
- Mode: Single-player

Socks the Cat Rocks the Hill is a platform video game developed by Realtime Associates for the Super Nintendo Entertainment System. The game stars Socks, the real-life presidential pet cat of the Clinton family during Bill Clinton's tenure in office. Originally scheduled for release in 1993, Socks the Cat experienced delays until it was ultimately cancelled due to the closure of publisher Kaneko's U.S. branch. A prototype copy eventually entered the hands of private collectors; following a successful Kickstarter campaign, the ROM image was released to the public in 2018.

Set in Washington D.C., Socks the Cat Rocks the Hill follows the title character as he makes his way past spies, politicians, and the news media to warn the Clinton family of a stolen nuclear missile launch device. The game makes heavy use of political satire, including bosses designed as caricatures of former U.S. presidents and other political figures. Nintendo reportedly liked the game despite their censorship policies during the era which condemned games with political content. The political satire was also praised by contemporary critics, although the game was otherwise found to be average.

== Synopsis ==
The game begins with Socks observing foreign spies stealing a nuclear missile launch unit in the basement of a foreign embassy. He embarks on a journey through eleven stages through landmarks in the Washington D.C. area like The Pentagon to return to the Oval Office in the White House and alert the Clinton family. Throughout the game, Socks must overcome the likes of foreign spies, politicians, the United States Secret Service, and the news media. The bosses are caricatures of political figures, such as Gerald Ford, Jimmy Carter, and Ross Perot. In one situation, Socks must push Millie the dog, pet of former president George H. W. Bush, out the front door to avoid Arab terrorist felines. Also, Richard Nixon calls in bomb raids and Ted Kennedy is seen driving a car on a bridge.

== History ==
Socks the Cat Rocks the Hill features caricatures of political figures, such as Richard Nixon

Kaneko originally planned two entirely different games to feature Socks, one for the Super NES to be developed by Realtime Associates, and the other by an undisclosed developer for the Genesis. The SNES and Genesis games were both occasionally referred to as Socks the Cat Rocks the House in some early publications; however, this title would later refer to the Genesis game only. The "Socks the Cat" license was not owned by the Clinton family, but rather a fan club known as the Presidential Socks Partnership. Kaneko purchased the license from the fan club, with some of the profits given to The Humane Society of the United States and the Children's Defense Fund, one of Hillary Clinton's favorite charities.

Socks the Cat was first unveiled and demonstrated by Kaneko on June 2, 1993, at the Consumer Electronics Show in Chicago. The first release window provided was for late 1993, but was repeatedly delayed, pushing its release into mid-1994. Shortly before its scheduled release, Socks the Cat was canceled due to the closure of Kaneko's U.S. division. Although Nintendo's censorship policies during the late 1980s and early 1990s condemned games that had "subliminal political messages or overt political statements", Nintendo reportedly liked the game. Former Realtime Associates employees have stated the game was finished. One former developer, David Warhol, stated the game "was very irreverent...maybe it's better it didn't come out after all!"

Some time after its cancellation, a prototype copy was sold by a former Kaneko employee to video game collector Jason Wilson. In 2011, a five-minute video was uploaded to YouTube showing gameplay from the cartridge, giving proof of the game's existence. In 2012, Wilson sold the game to collector Tom Curtin for the same amount as a "decent used car". The sale was made in part because Curtin wished to release the game. He acquired the rights to the "Socks the Cat" trademark in 2015 and planned to launch a Kickstarter crowdfunding campaign to fund a release of the game. The campaign was launched on October 10, 2016 and finished 110% funded on November 8, 2016, the same day as the 2016 US presidential election (in which Hillary Clinton was the Democratic nominee). The campaign anticipated a 2017 release; the game finally released on February 1, 2018.

== Reception ==
Reception

Review scores
Publication	Score
Electronic Gaming Monthly	5.8/10 (Note: Electronic Gaming Monthly's individual scores were 7, 6, 6, 5, and 5.)
Nintendo Power	3.2/5 (Note: Nintendo Power's individual review scores were 3.4, 3.2, 3.1, and 3.1.)

Although never fully released at the time of development, Socks the Cat Rocks the Hill was reviewed by multiple publications who generally saw it as an average platformer albeit with excellent boss design and political satire. Nintendo Power found the boss characters to be humorous but criticized the poor controls. GamePro also praised the bosses and the satire, but were more critical with the flat graphics and poor sound. They provided scores of 3.0 for graphics, 2.5 for sound, 3.5 for controls, and 3.5 for "fun factor" (out of 5). Nintendo Power believed poor controls made the game challenging, but GamePro found the game easy and thought the controls "take practice but prove effective." Electronic Gaming Monthly dubbed it "a cute run-and-jump, claw the enemies game."
