= Buddy (Bill Clinton's dog) =

Chocolate-colored Labrador Retriever

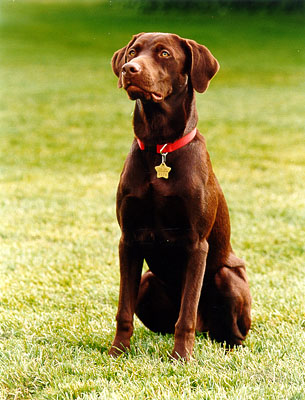
- Breed: Labrador Retriever
- Sex: Male
- Born: August 7, 1997; Federalsburg, Maryland, U.S.
- Died: January 2, 2002 (aged 4); Chappaqua, New York, U.S.
- Cause of death: Hit by a car
- Occupation: First Dog of the United States
- Years active: 1997–2002
- Known for: Being the pet of the First Family of the United States
- Owner: Clinton family
- Appearance: Brown fur

Buddy (August 7, 1997 – January 2, 2002), a male chocolate-colored Labrador Retriever, was one of two pets kept by the Clinton family while Bill Clinton was President of the United States. The Clintons' other pet was a cat named Socks.

== Life ==
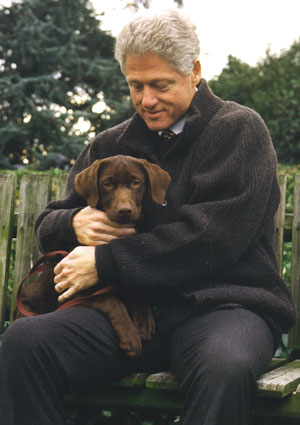
Bill Clinton and Buddy on December 5, 1997

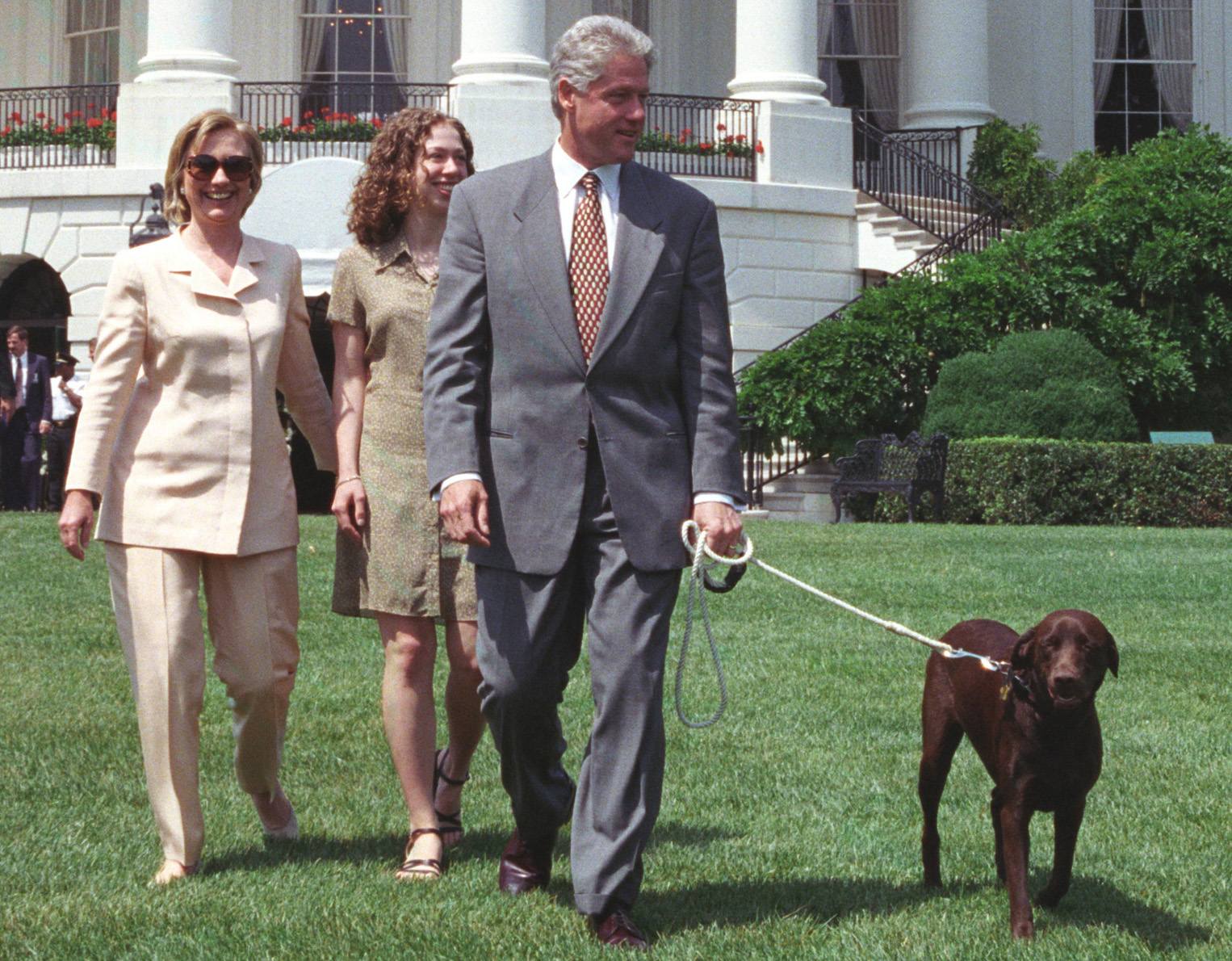
Buddy being walked by the Clintons on the White House lawn in 1998

Clinton adopted Buddy as a three-month-old puppy from Caroline County, Maryland, in December 1997. He named him after his great-uncle, Henry Oren "Buddy" Grisham, who had died the previous June and whom Clinton often cited as a major influence on his life. Socks did not get along with Buddy, who was frisky, so the White House had to keep the two in separate quarters. Since this arrangement would be no longer possible in the Clintons' smaller home in New York, Socks was left under the care of Bill Clinton's secretary, Betty Currie.

== Death ==
According to a police report, Buddy was killed by a car while "playfully chasing a contractor" who had left the Clinton home in Chappaqua, New York, on January 2, 2002. The Clintons were not home at the time of the accident; their home was being watched by Secret Service agents. The agents rushed Buddy to an animal hospital where he was pronounced dead.

In June 2002, Clinton acquired another chocolate Labrador whom he named "Seamus".

== Cultural references ==
First Lady Hillary Clinton wrote a children's book called Dear Socks, Dear Buddy: Kids' Letters to the First Pets in 1998. It included excerpts from more than 50 letters written to the First Pets by children and more than 80 photographs of Socks and Buddy.

Buddy was a central character in Rick Cleveland's 2005 one-man show My Buddy Bill, relating the writer's fictional friendship with Bill Clinton, which began when both men discovered their common interest in dogs.

== See also ==
- United States presidential pets
- List of individual dogs
- List of Labrador Retrievers

Honorary titles
Preceded by Millie (George H. W. Bush's; Springer Spaniel) (January 20, 1993)	White House pet dog December 1997 – January 20, 2001	Succeeded by Barney (George W. Bush's; Scottish Terrier)
