= Millie's Book =

1990 children's book by Barbara Bush

Millie's Book: As Dictated to Barbara Bush
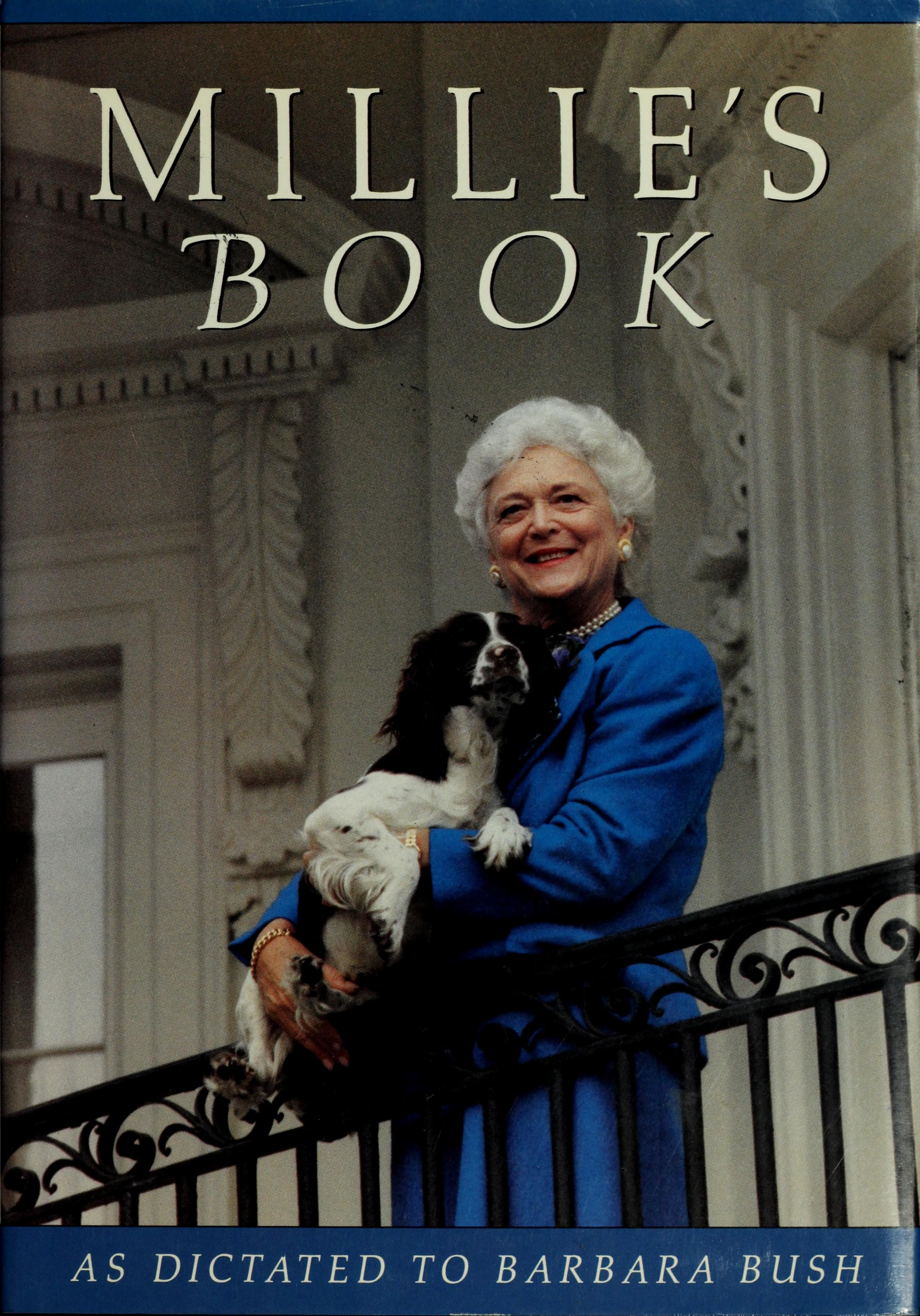
- Author: Barbara Bush
- Genre: Children's literature
- Published: 1990

Millie's Book: As Dictated to Barbara Bush is a 1990 children's book by Millie the English Springer Spaniel, as dictated to by Barbara Bush. After-tax proceeds from book sales were donated to the Barbara Bush Foundation for Family Literacy.

The book reached number one on The New York Times Best Seller list (nonfiction) in 1990, and spent 23 weeks on Publishers Weekly's hardcover best seller list. In 1991, Millie's Book was recognized by Guinness World Records as the "best-selling book by a canine author".

== See also ==
- C. Fred's Story, 1990 children's book Barbara Bush
- Dear Socks, Dear Buddy, 1998 children's book by Hillary Clinton
- Marlon Bundo's A Day in the Life of the Vice President, 2018 children's book by Charlotte Pence
