= Barbara Feinman Todd =

American journalist, ghostwriter, and lecturer

Barbara Feinman Todd is an American journalist, ghostwriter, and lecturer. She worked as a journalist at the The Washington Post. She was a lecturer at Georgetown University, the first director of undergraduate journalism, an associate dean at the university, and an emeritus professor of the practice.

== Early life and education ==
Feinman was born about 1960. She attended Occidental College before transferring to the University of California, Berkeley, where she obtained a degree in creative writing in 1982.

== Career ==
Feinman became a copy aide at The Washington Post. In 1986, Feinman was working as a researcher for Bob Woodward for his book "Veil: The Secret Wars of the CIA, 1981–1987". Feinman also carried out research for Carl Bernstein's memoir "Loyalties" and also for Ben Bradlee's memoir. Feinman ghostwrote memoirs for Hanan Ashrawi and Morry Taylor. In 1994, she co-wrote "A Women's Place: The Freshmen Women who Changed the Face of Congress" with Marjorie Margolies-Mezvinsky.

Feinman ghostwrote significant parts of Hillary Clinton's memoir "It Takes a Village". In 1997, she was at the center of controversy about the book when the press found out she had not been given credit.

Feinman became a lecturer at Georgetown University about 1992 teaching in the English department. She built up the university's journalism offerings from one course to a minor and a master's degree program. Feinman would go on to become the first director of undergraduate journalism.

In 2008, she was an Associate Dean. Feinman was later appointed professor of the practice emeritus.

In 2017, she published her own memoir, Pretend I’m Not Here.

== Critical reception ==
Of her memoir Pretend I'm not Here, USA Today said "this short engaging memoir... is worth reading and possibly a boon for hygiene. After you're done reading it, you want to take a shower."

Hippocampus magazine said "Serious writers of nonfiction, essayists and biographers, deadline journalists and narrative historians, will derive benefit from this deftly written memoir of literary collaboration and political shenanigans inside the Beltway."

Of the book, Book Reporter said "Feinman Todd offers authentic portraits that go beyond the carefully polished public personas that are the standard fare of the Washington publicity factory. At its heart, [it's] is a funny and forthcoming story of a young woman in a male-dominated world trying to find her own voice while eloquently speaking for others."

== Books ==
=== Author ===
- Pretend I'm Not Here: How I Worked with Three Newspaper Icons, One Powerful First Lady, and Still Managed to Dig Myself Out of the Washington Swamp (William Morrow, 2017)

=== Co-author ===
- Margolies-Mezvinsky, Marjorie and Barbara Feinman. A Women's Place: The Freshmen Women who Changed the Face of Congress. (co-writer)

=== Ghostwriter ===
- It Takes a Village (1996) Hillary Clinton (ghostwriter)
- Veil: The Secret Wars of the CIA (1987) Bob Woodward (ghostwriter)
- A Good Life Ben Bradlee (ghostwriter)
