= Socks (cat) =

Cat belonging to Bill Clinton and family

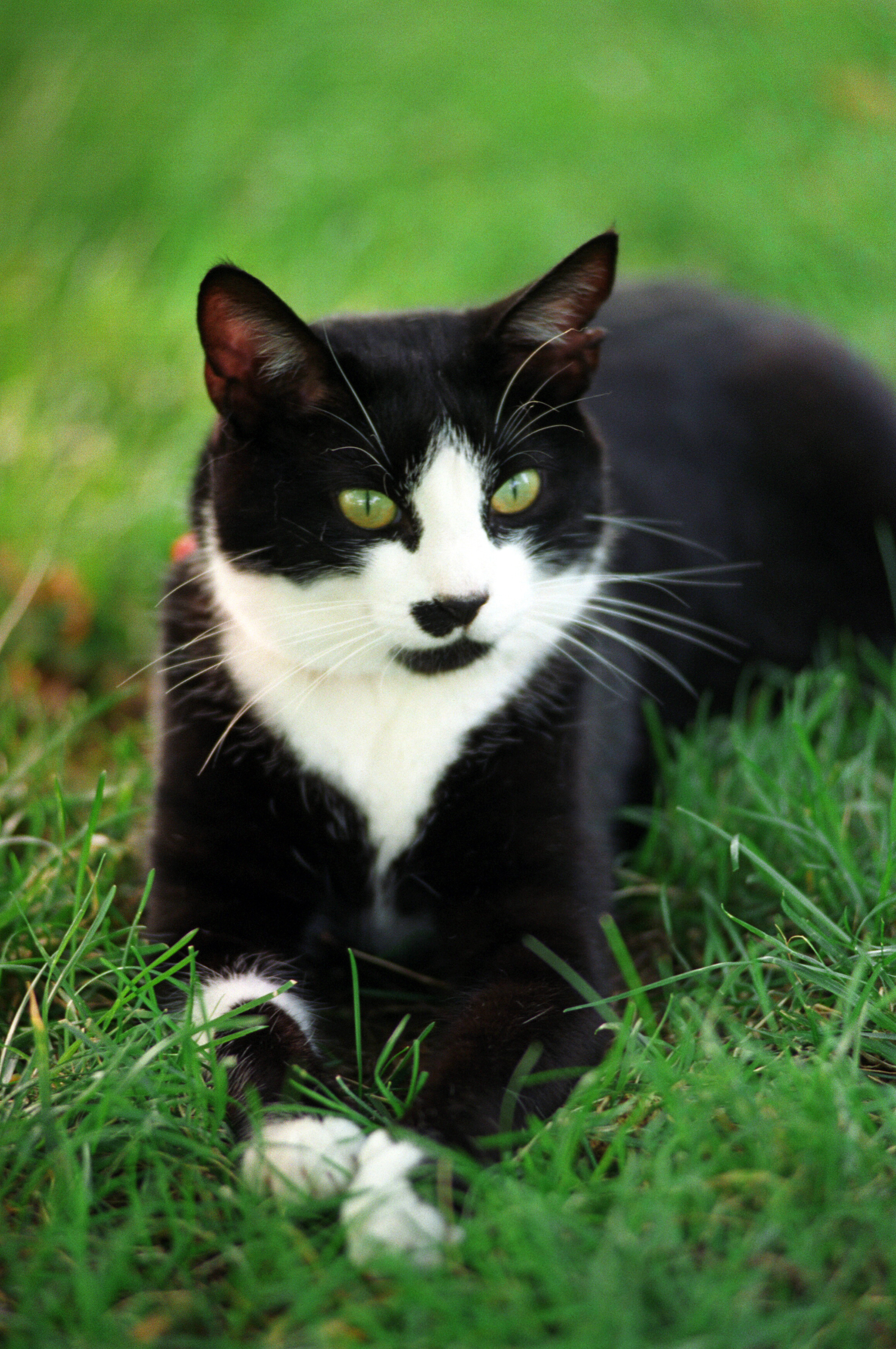
- Socks in 1994
- Other names: First Cat, First Cat of the United States
- Species: Cat
- Breed: Domestic short-haired cat
- Sex: Male
- Born: c. 1989; Little Rock, Arkansas, U.S.
- Died: February 20, 2009 (aged 19 or 20); Hollywood, Maryland, U.S.
- Cause of death: Euthanasia due to jaw cancer.
- Occupation: First Cat of the United States (1993 – 2001); First Cat of Arkansas (1991 – 92)
- Predecessor: Cleo and Sara
- Successor: India
- Owners: Clinton family (1991 – 2001); Betty Currie (2001 – 2009)
- Appearance: Black-and-white tuxedo
- Socks's voice Socks' meow Recorded c. 1993 – c. 2001

Socks (c. 1989 – February 20, 2009) was the pet cat of the Clinton family, the first family of the United States from 1993 to 2001. An adopted stray, he was the pet of the Clintons during the administration, and after President Bill Clinton left office, was given to his then-secretary Betty Currie. Socks was first adopted by the Clinton family in 1991 after he jumped into the arms of Chelsea Clinton.

Following Bill Clinton's win at the 1992 United States presidential election, Socks became a media sensation, in which he was a favorite to both staff and visitors of the White House, and was often taken to schools and hospitals. He himself appeared on an episode of the sitcom Murphy Brown in 1993, where he gets inadvertently kidnapped from the White House during a press dinner.

Socks' likeness continued making appearance, in which he was portrayed on an illustrated book, the then-cancelled Kaneko video game Socks the Cat Rocks the Hill (1993), and as a Muppet in Larry King Live. Socks was the mascot for the White House website's kids' page and featured in Hillary Clinton's children's book Dear Socks, Dear Buddy: Kids' Letters to the First Pets (1998), of which the latter's proceeds were given to the National Park Foundation.

After the Clintons left the White House in 2001, Socks was adopted by Currie, which was primarily due to tensions between him and chocolate Labrador Retriever dog Buddy that began in 1997, which Socks never tolerated. By the administration's conclusion, he received hundreds of letters each month. While living with Currie, he continued making appearances to animal-based charities and other events until his death from euthanasia due to jaw cancer in 2009. Socks was 19 or 20 years old at the time of his death.

== Biography ==
=== 1989–1993: Birth and adoption ===
Socks was likely born in early 1989, based on a veterinarian's estimate that he would have turned 20 in early 2009. A tuxedo cat, he was originally a stray, adopted by the Clintons in 1991 after he jumped into the arms of Chelsea Clinton leaving her piano teacher’s house in Little Rock, Arkansas. He was found with his sibling, Midnight, who was later adopted by another family.

His name was inspired by his white paws, which resembled those of the title character of the Beverly Cleary novel Socks. Socks became a media sensation after Bill Clinton's win at the 1992 United States presidential election, in which he told the press to "leave the cat alone". Photographers followed Socks on the lawn of then-presidential elect Clinton's mansion, with them reportedly luring him close to their camera with catnip.

=== 1993–2001: Bill Clinton's presidency ===
When Bill Clinton became president, Socks moved with the family from the governor's mansion to the White House and became the principal pet of the First Family in Clinton's first term. For safety concerns, Socks was put on a leash when outdoors. He became a favorite to both staff and visitors, including foreign heads of state, and was often taken to schools and hospitals. In 1996 and for the remainder of the Clinton administration, Socks served as a mascot for the White House website's kids' page. During his announcement of the Next Generation Internet Program in that year, President Clinton stated, "When I took office, only high energy physicists had ever heard of what is called the World Wide Web. Now even my cat has its own page."

In 1997, Indiana Representative Dan Burton, then the chairman of the House Oversight Committee, once publicly questioned the use of White House staff, postage, and stationery to answer mail addressed to the cat. In addition, chocolate Labrador Retriever dog Buddy was adopted by the Clintons that year. This led to tensions between him and Socks, who was known for hissing as documented in multiple photographs. Although they spent over three years together in the White House, Socks never tolerated Buddy. Upon leaving the presidential office in 2001, President Clinton later lamented, "I did better with the Palestinians and the Israelis than I've done with Socks and Buddy." During the Clinton administration, Socks received hundreds of letters, cards, and photographs each month, which were sent back with photographs of the cat and his pawprint.

=== 2001–2007: Betty Currie years ===
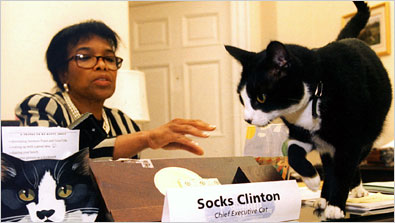
An undated photo of Betty Currie and Socks as he walks on her desk.

When the Clintons left the White House in 2001, Clinton allowed his secretary Betty Currie to take Socks to her home in suburban Virginia. The primary reason for Socks moving in with Currie was due to continuing tensions with Buddy, with Socks developing a relationship with Currie after discovering her dish of butterscotch and willingness to cuddle. Additionally, Currie lost her own pet and asked the Clinton family if she could adopt Socks.

The cat quickly adjusted to Currie's house, with the latter stating it's "safe for a cat to walk around" compared to the White House. He also appealed to Currie's husband Bob, who wasn't fond of and was allergic to cats, and stated he had a nice personality and was smart. Socks spent the majority of his time sitting or sleeping in a chair in Currie's office, and Buddy would die within a year, being hit by a car in 2002.

Socks continued making public appearances after President Clinton left office, including career days at schools close to Washington and being a regular participant at the St. Mary's County Animal Welfare League's animal fair until 2008. He also supported animal-related charities, signing photographs of himself with his paw print to raise funds. In 2002, Socks visited LIttle Rock to lead the city's Christmas parade, in which he rode a 1967 Ford Mustang previously owned by Bill Clinton. In 2007, he visited Fisher House, a Ronald McDonald-type house for military families, at Andrews Air Force Base.

=== 2008–2009: Declining health and death ===
In June 2008, Socks was reported to be still living with Currie and her husband in Hollywood, Maryland, about 60 miles from Washington, but had a thyroid condition, hair and weight loss, and kidney disease. According to Currie, she stated Socks was fascinated by the possibility of the Clintons returning to the White House as Hillary Clinton, who later became Senator, ran for a presidential election. In August, he participated in National Dog Day in Solomons. Socks began losing weight in November 2008, and by December, was reported to be in failing health, apparently suffering from cancer.

On February 20, 2009, Socks died from euthanasia at the Notch Veterinary Clinic in Hollywood, Maryland, after suffering from cancer located in his jaw. Currie states that his condition worsened throughout the week and wouldn't eat for two days. A veterinarian said he was either 19 or 20 at the time of his death. Bill and Hillary Clinton released a joint statement through the William J. Clinton Foundation, which said that they were grateful for Socks' happiness and enjoyment to them, Chelsea, cat lovers, and children, thanking Currie for taking care of Socks in his final years. Socks was later cremated, and Time held an obituary of him in its milestones section. In March 2009, during a private ceremony, Socks' ashes were spread in the west flower garden of Bill Clinton's former Arkansas mansion.

== Cultural references ==
Socks was featured in multiple cultural references throughout Bill Clinton's presidency. His first cultural appearance was on the illustrated book Socks Goes to Washington: The Diary of America's First Cat, written by Michael O'Donoghue and Jean-Claude Suares, and published in 1993. In December 1993, Socks played himself in the sitcom Murphy Brown episode "Sox and the Single Girl," in which he is inadvertently kidnapped from the White House during a press dinner.

On April 1, 1994, Socks made an appearance in Muppet form on Larry King Live, where he gave Kermit the Frog a tour of the White House. That year, artist Phillip Grace created a chair portrait of Hillary Clinton and Socks. After being purchased in Chicago and given to the Clintons, it became on display in the gifts section of Bill Clinton's presidential museum when it opened in 2004, though it has been rotated out of public view.

An adventure video game based on Socks was designed by Kaneko for Super NES and Sega Genesis platforms under the title Socks the Cat Rocks the Hill in 1993. It depicts him crossing obstacles including spies and corrupt politicians to warn the Clintons of nuclear threat. However, it was never released due to concerns that the video game was too partisan and Kaneko's US branch shutting down. Despite its cancellation, Socks the Cat Rocks the Hill was nearly completed and received reviews from several video game publications. The game was later released in 2018 as an unlicensed Super NES cartridge.

In 1997, First Lady Hillary Clinton carried a Socks-shaped minaudière to the year's inaugural ball. Designed by Judith Leiber, famous for her whimsically shaped, rhinestone-encrusted evening bags, it is currently on display at the Amsterdam Museum of Bags and Purses. In 1998, Hillary Clinton, with ghostwriting from Linda Kulman, wrote a children's book called Dear Socks, Dear Buddy: Kids' Letters to the First Pets in 1998, which contained letters to Socks and Buddy from children. Proceeds for the book went to the National Park Foundation, the official charity of America's National Park Service. Posthumously, a bracelet featuring a portrait of Socks is sold at the Clinton Presidential Library.

== Gallery ==
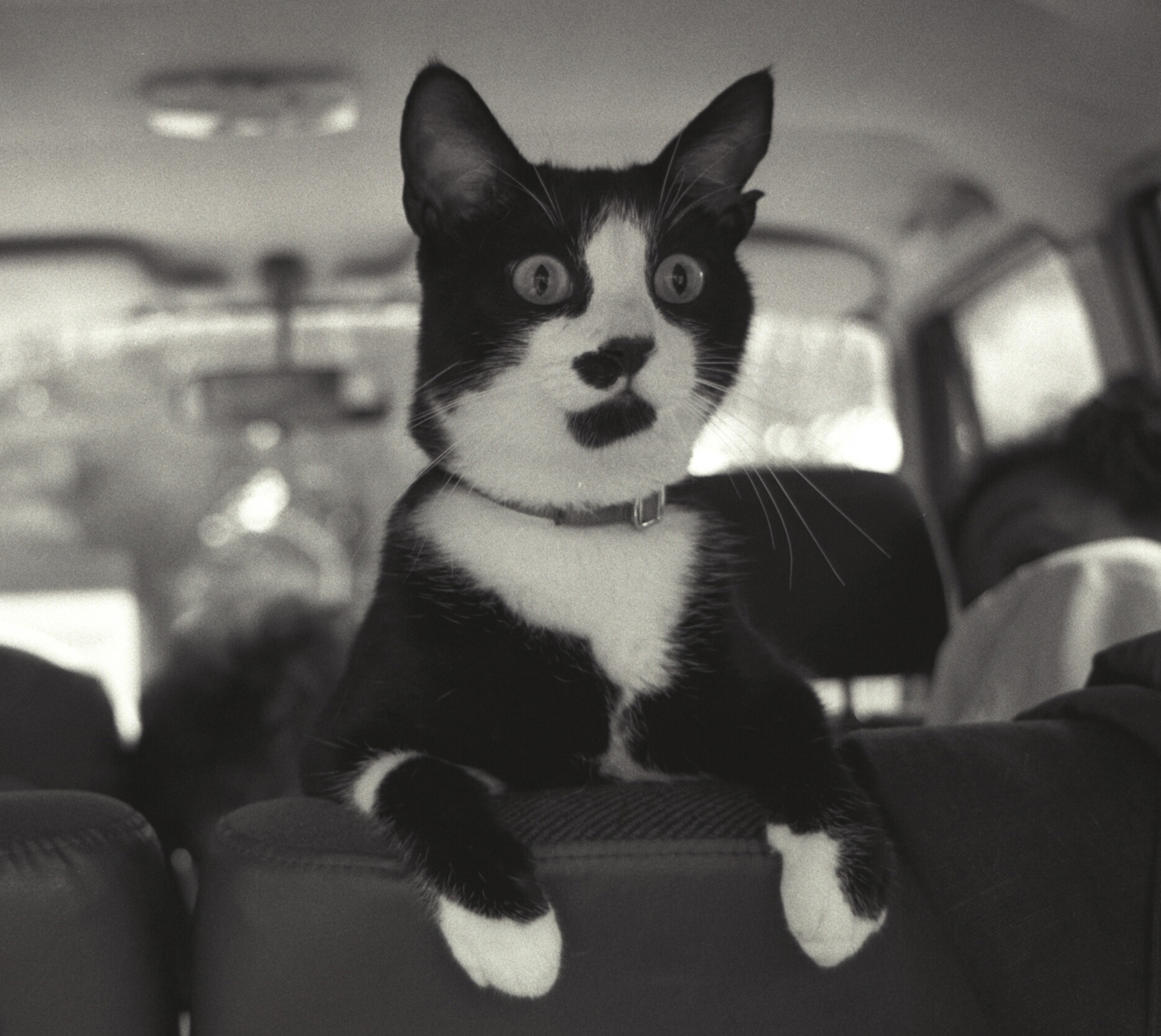
Socks perching on the backseat of a van, 1993

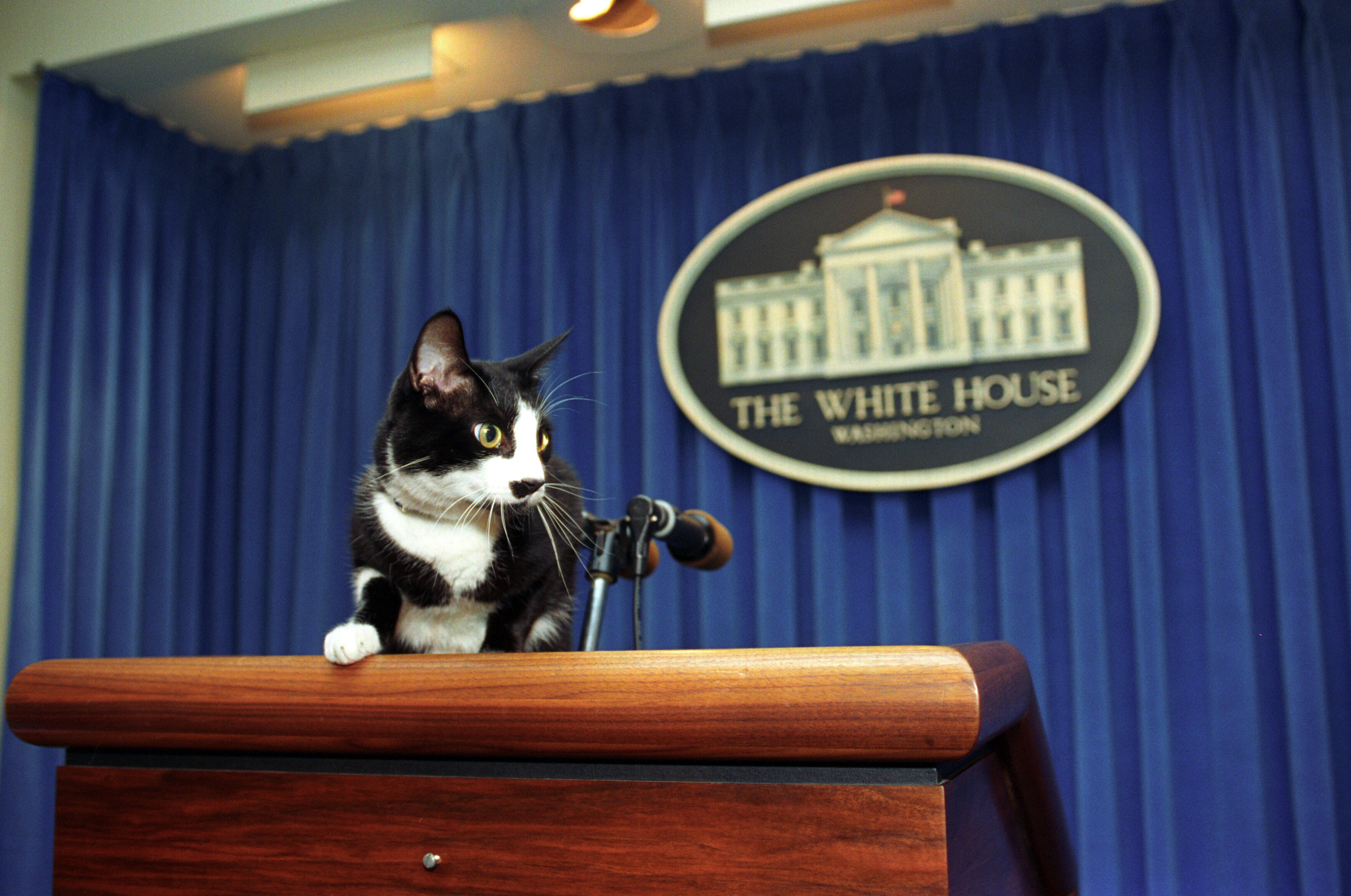
Socks at the lectern in the White House Press Briefing Room, 1993

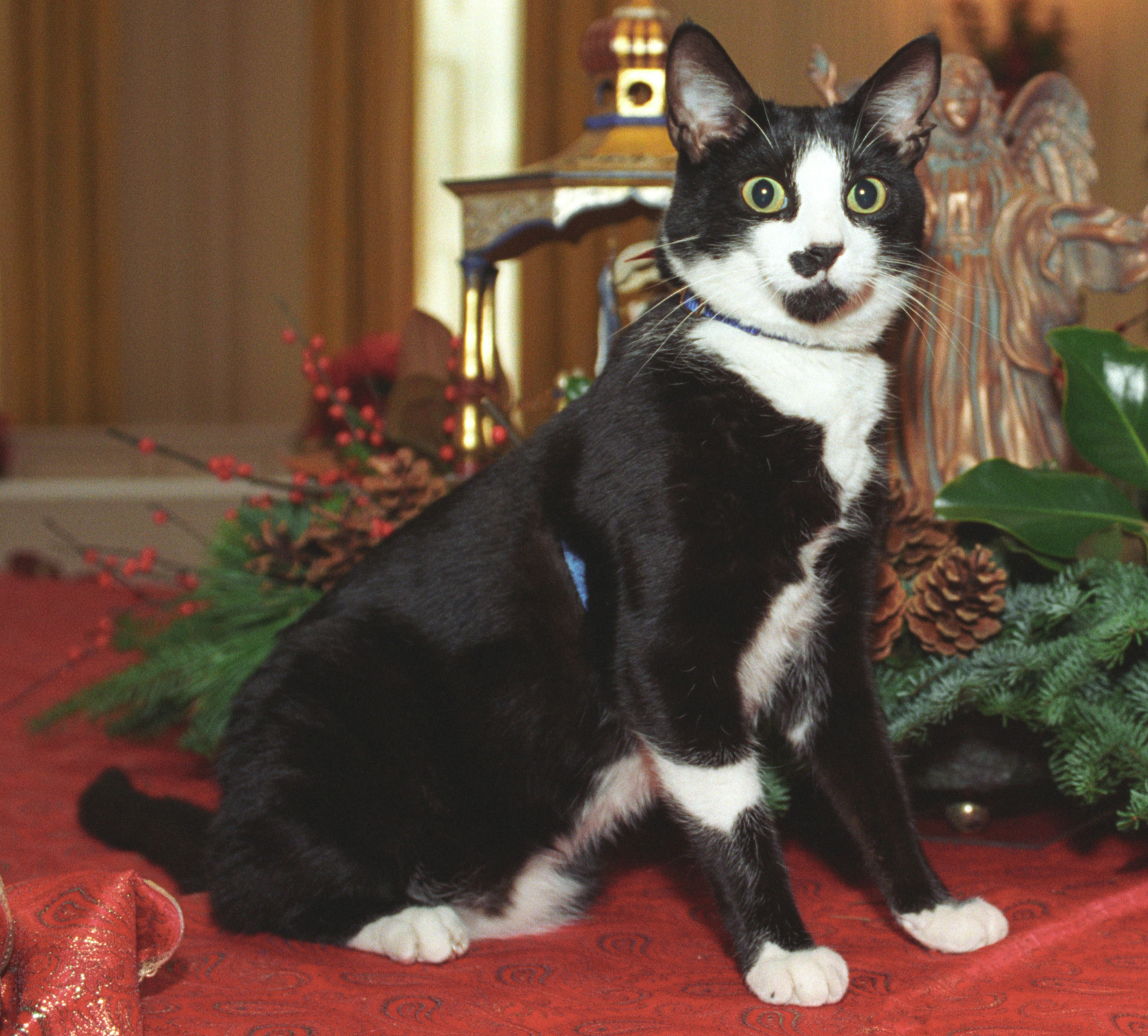
Socks near the Christmas decorations in the White House, 1993

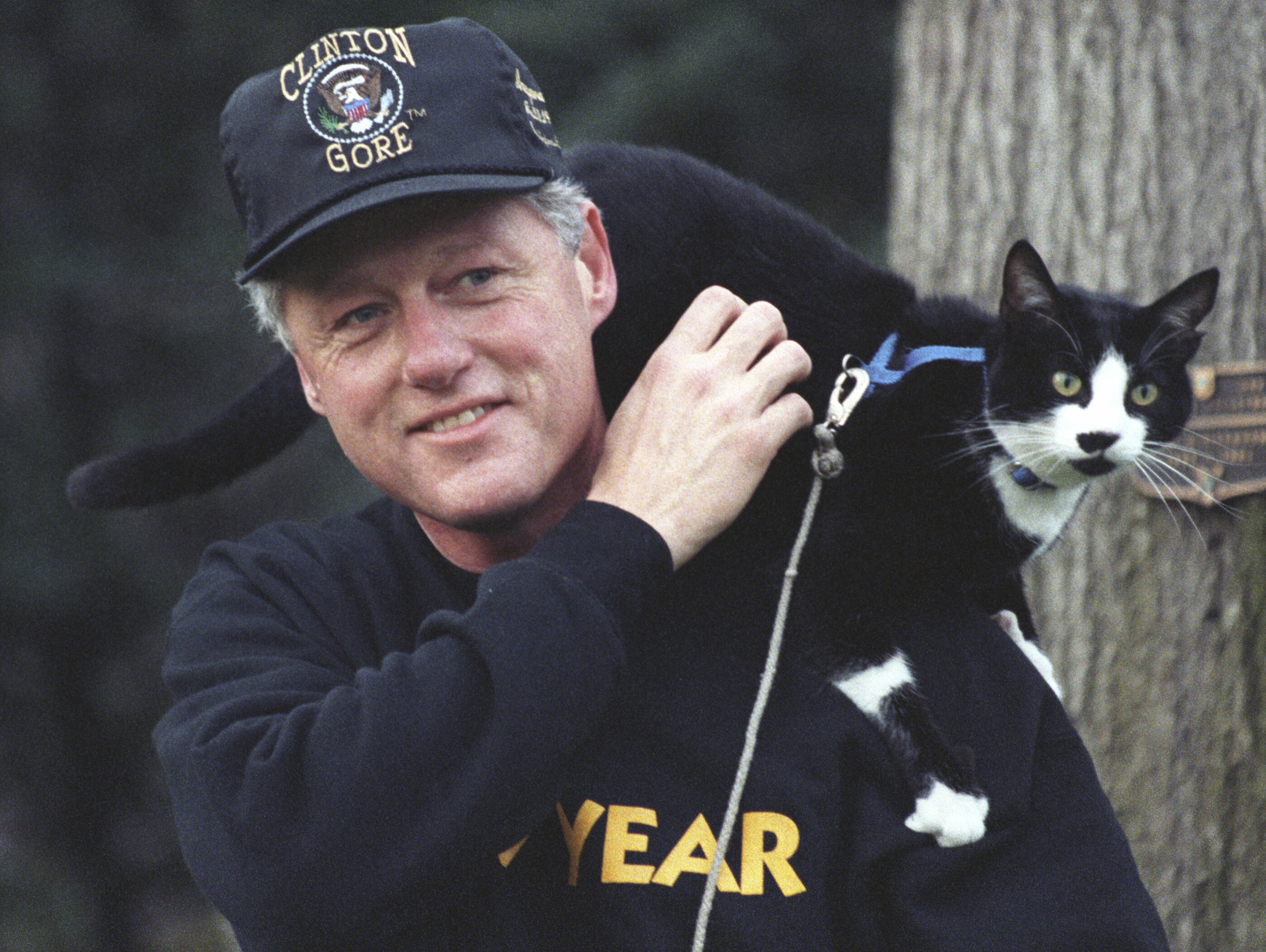
Socks perching on President Clinton's shoulder, 1993

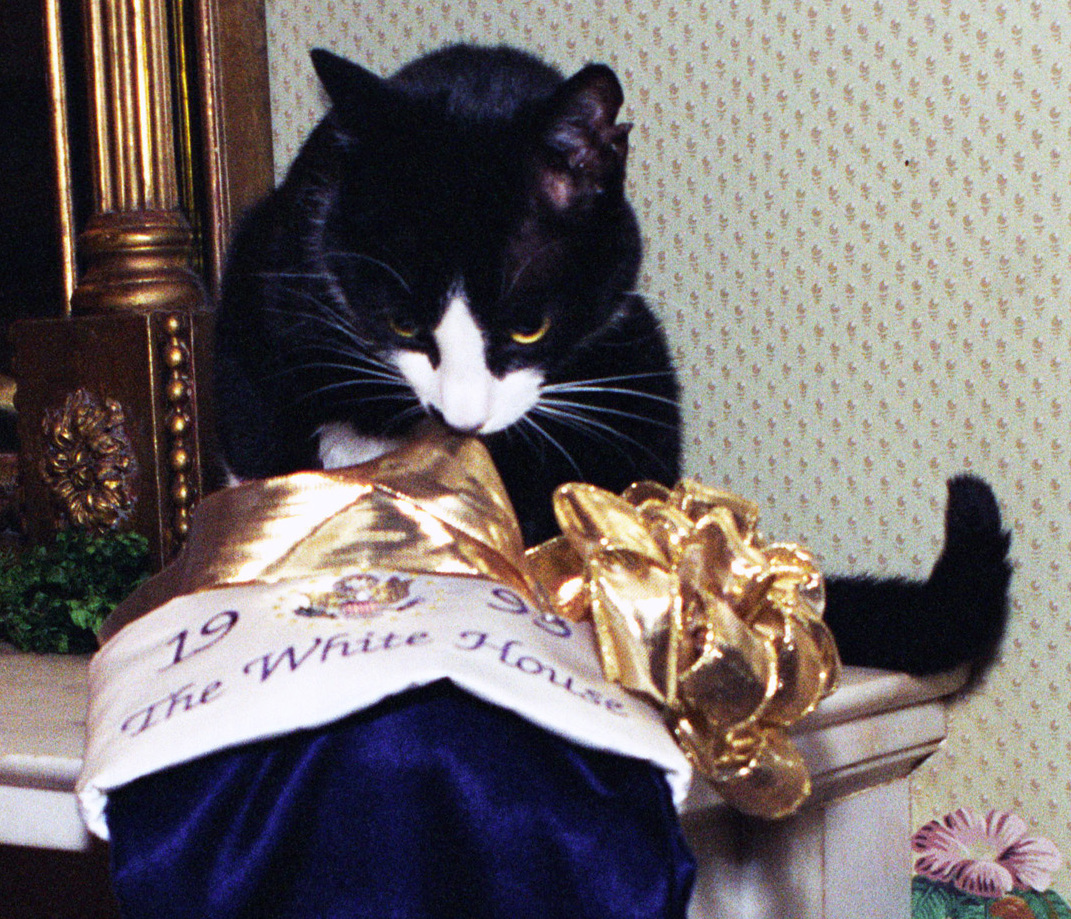
Socks peeking into his Christmas stocking, 1993

Socks sitting at the Resolute desk in the Oval Office, 1994

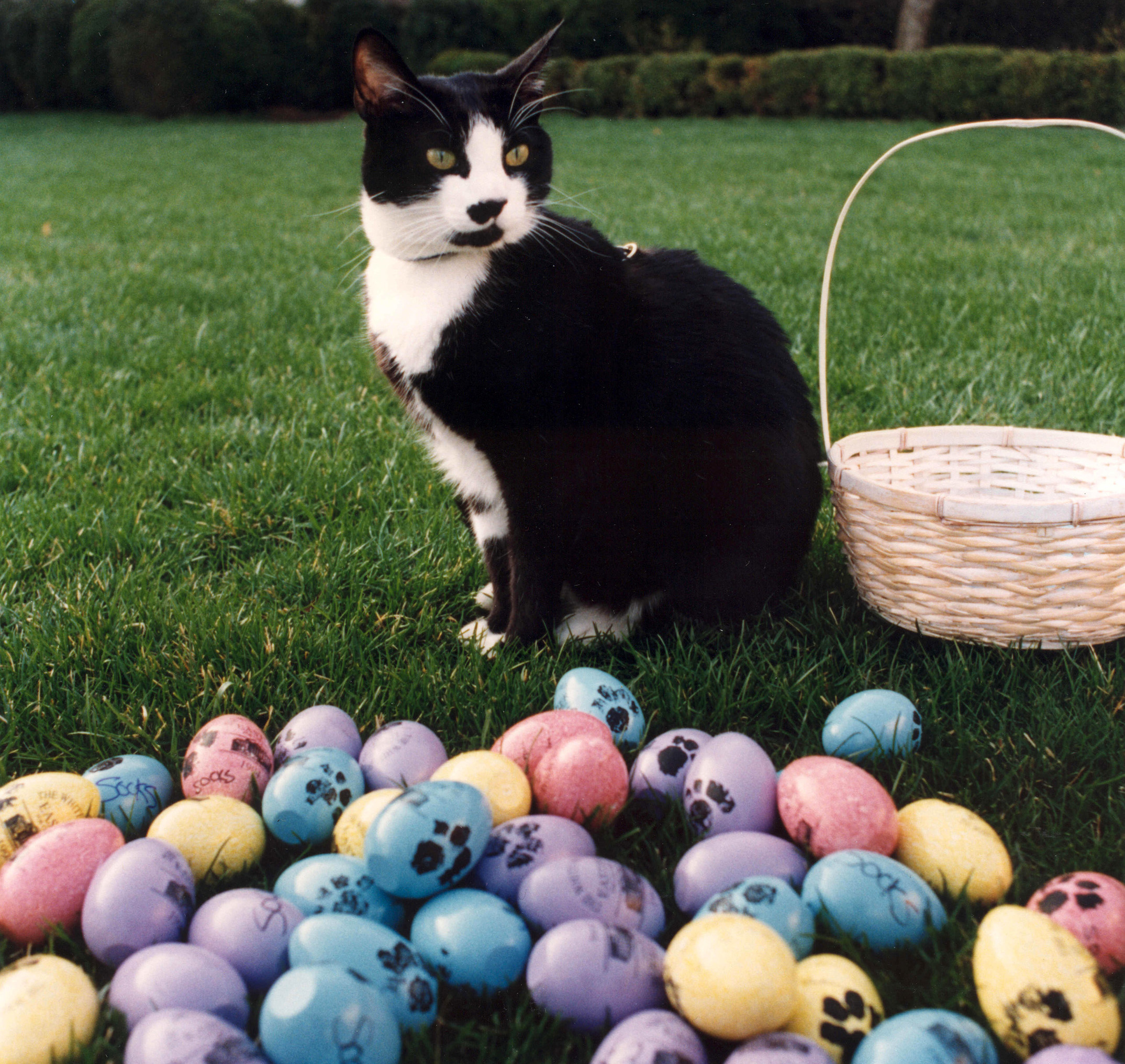
Socks with Easter eggs, 1994

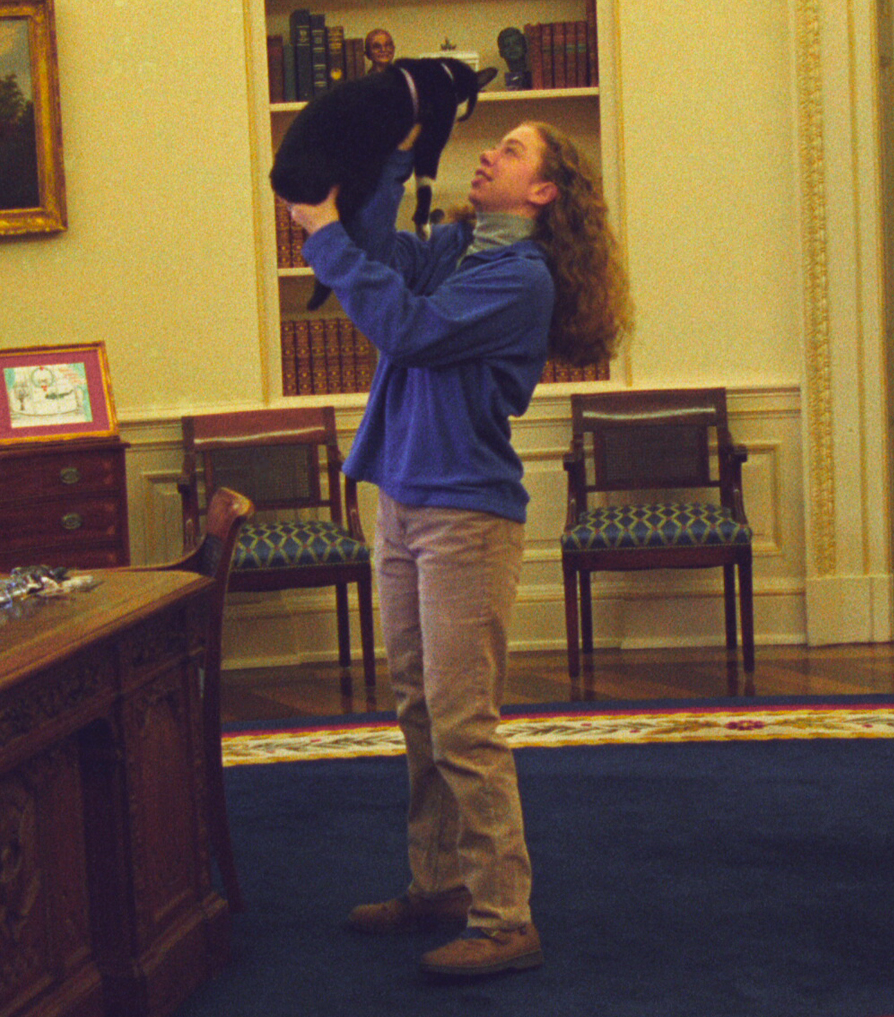
Chelsea Clinton playing with Socks in the Oval Office, 1994

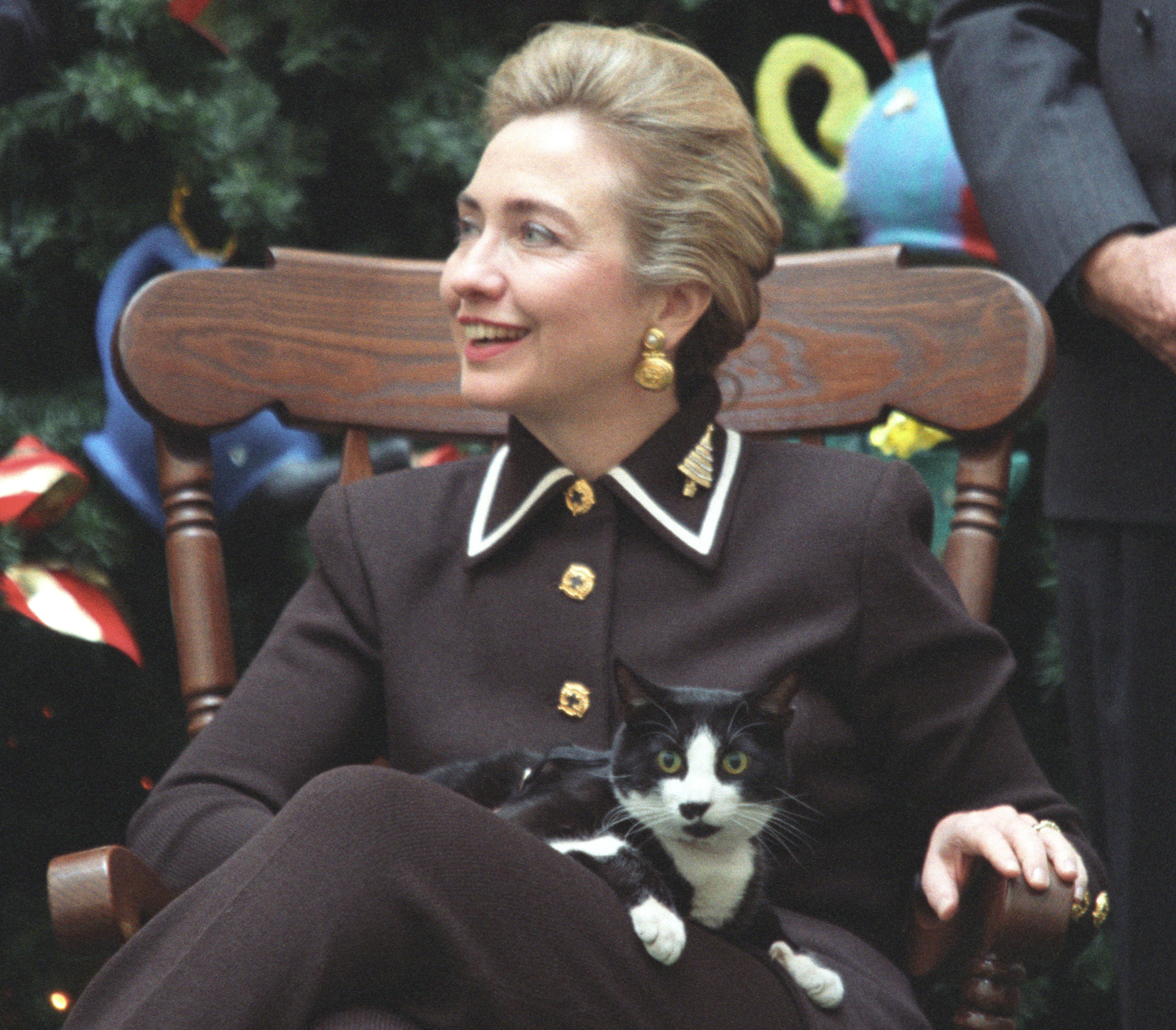
Socks sitting in Hillary Clinton's lap, 1995

President Clinton and Hillary Clinton playing with Socks, 1997

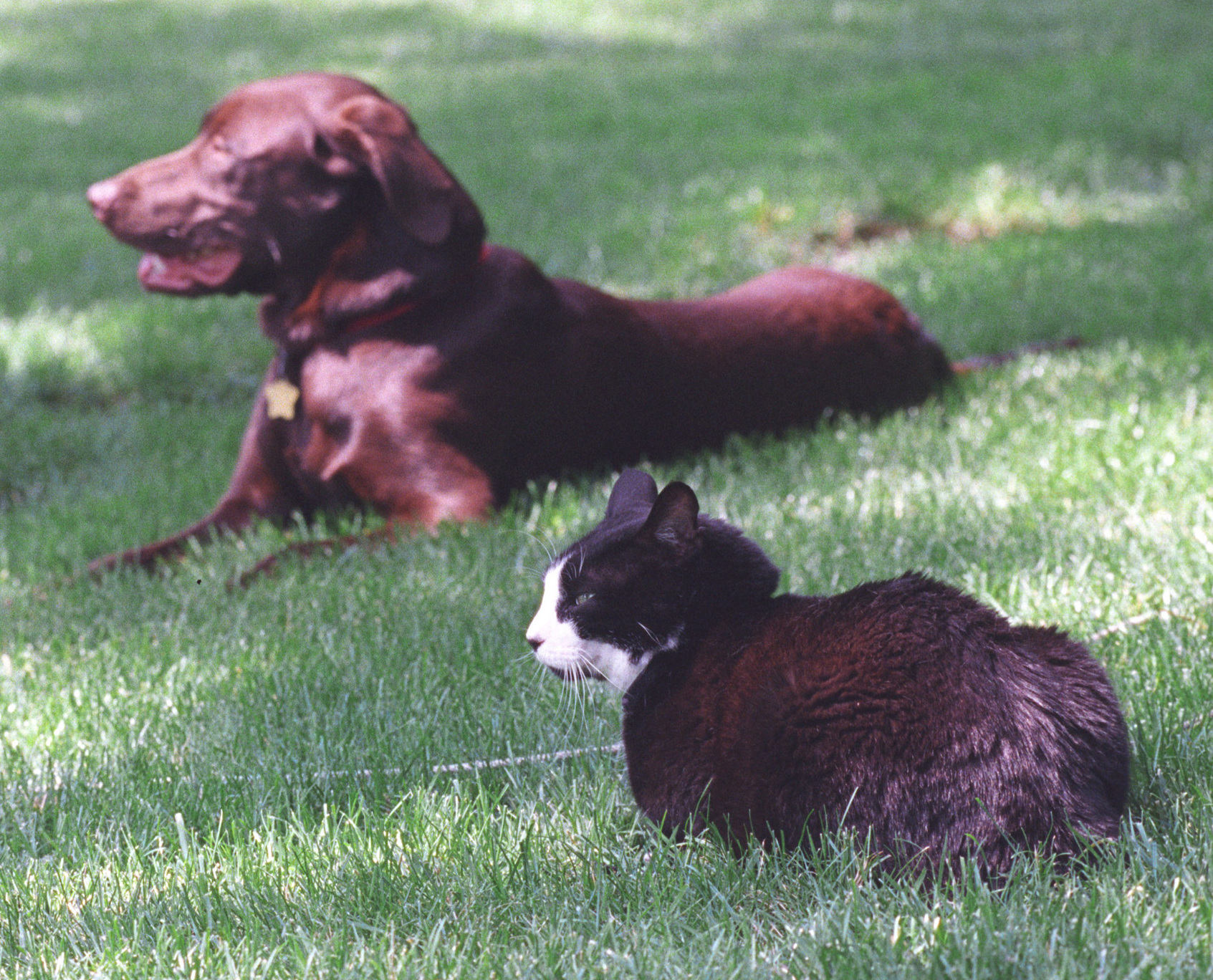
Socks and Buddy on the grass at the White House, 1998

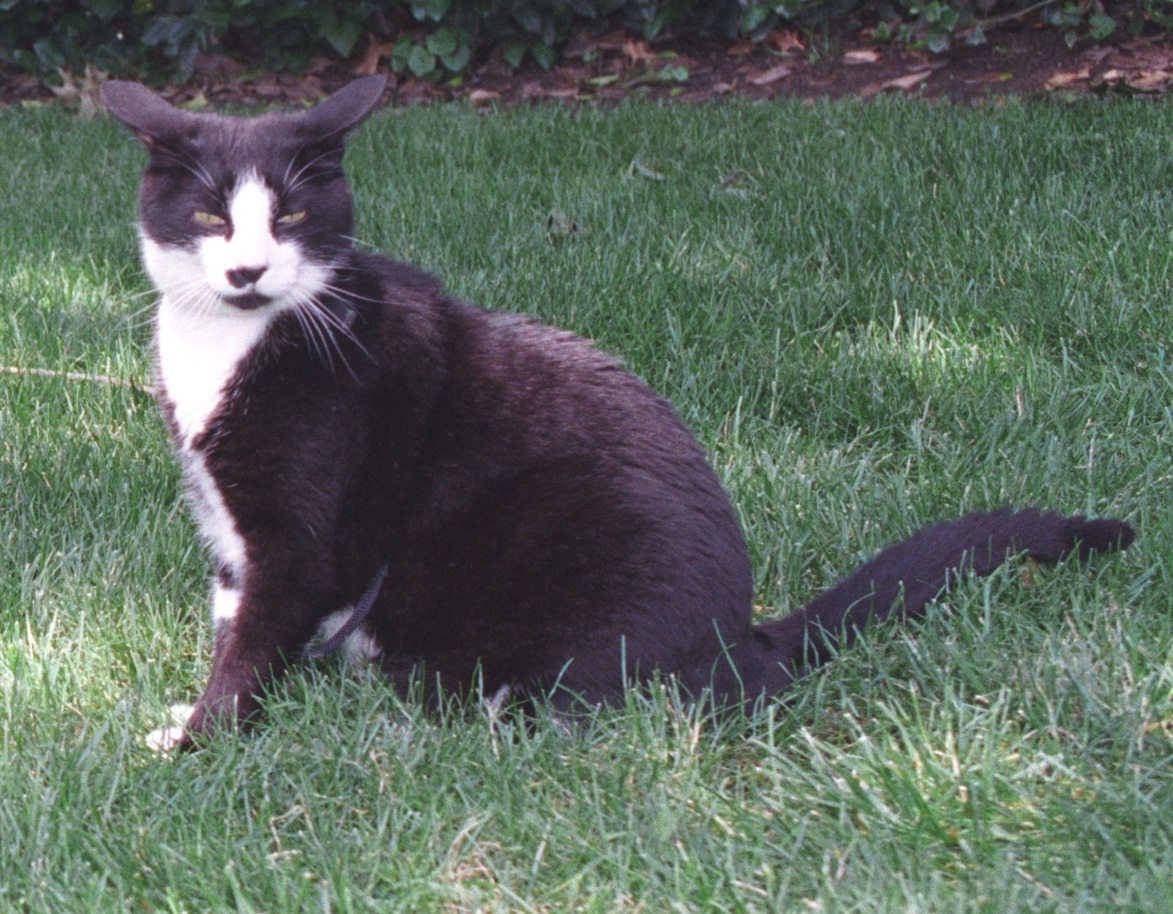
Socks the Cat on the grass at the White House, 1998

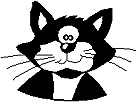
A likeness of Socks hosted on the children's version of the White House website

== See also ==
- United States presidential pets
- List of individual cats

Honorary titles
Preceded by Cleo and Sara (Ronald Reagan's tortoiseshell cats)	United States presidential cat January 20, 1993 – January 20, 2001	Succeeded by India (George W. Bush's; Black cat)
