= Presidential pets =

Presidential pets may refer to:

- United States presidential pets
- List of Taiwanese presidential pets
- List of Czech presidential pets
- Russian presidential pets
  - Pets of Vladimir Putin
  - Dorofei (2004–2014), cat owned by former president Dmitry Medvedev
- Indonesian presidential pet
  - Bobby Kertanegara, cat owned by president Prabowo Subianto
