= Spot Fetcher =

Pet dog of U.S. President George W. Bush

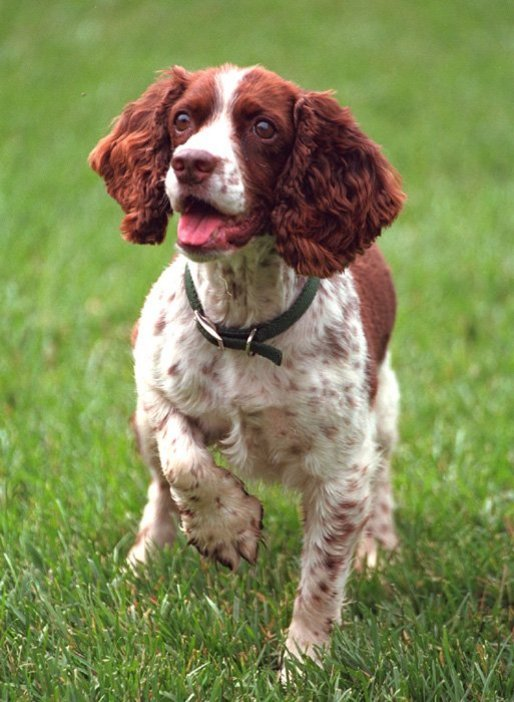
- Species: Canis familiaris
- Breed: English Springer Spaniel
- Sex: Female
- Born: March 17, 1989
- Died: February 21, 2004 (aged 14)
- Cause of death: Euthanasia
- Known for: Pet of First Family of the United States
- Owner: George W. Bush
- Parents: Tug Farish (sire); Millie (dam)
- Named after: Scott Fletcher

Spot "Spotty" Fetcher (March 17, 1989 – February 21, 2004) was U.S. President George W. Bush's dog. She was an English Springer Spaniel, named after Scott Fletcher, a baseball player with the Major League Baseball team Texas Rangers, a team George W. Bush owned before becoming Governor of Texas in 1994.

Born in the White House, she was the daughter of Millie, who had belonged to President George H. W. Bush and First Lady Barbara Bush. Her father was Tug Farish from Lane's End Farm in Kentucky, better known for its thoroughbred horse breeding program.

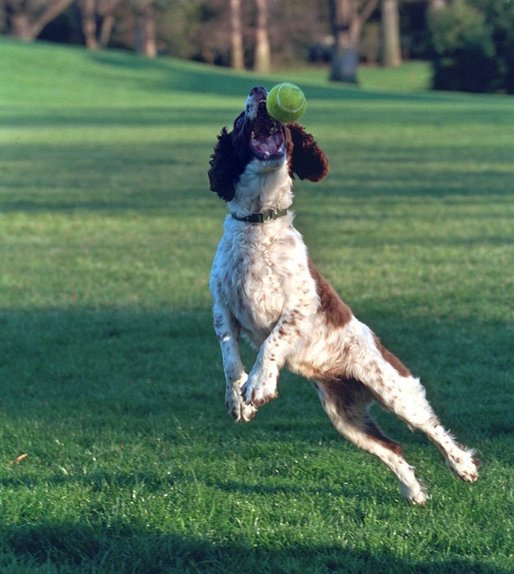
Spot catching a ball

She was euthanized after suffering a series of strokes. She was 14 years old.

Spot is the only presidential pet to have lived in the White House under two presidents, the two being George H. W. Bush and his son, George W. Bush.

George had a dog at the time of her death, Barney, who became a popular figure for the US, and later another dog, Miss Beazley, who was born eight months after Spot's death.

== See also ==
- United States presidential pets
- List of individual dogs

Honorary titles
Preceded by Buddy; Bill Clinton's; Labrador Retriever	White House pet dog January 20, 2001–January 20, 2009; Served alongside: Barney	Succeeded by Bo; Barack Obama's; Portuguese Water Dog
