= List of Taiwanese presidential pets =

Presidents of the Republic of China (Taiwan) have often kept pets while in office.

In addition to traditional pets, this list includes some animals normally considered livestock or working animals that have a close association with presidents or their families; occasionally the animals were given to the presidents from foreign dignitaries.

President	Pet(s)
Chiang Kai-shek	Hsiao-hei (小黑) – Poodle; Pai-lang (白朗) – Mongrel; was granted military rank.; Pu-lang (布朗) – German Shepherd dog
Yen Chia-kan	
Chiang Ching-kuo	
Lee Teng-hui	Around 30–40 Golden Retrievers; 6 cats; 1 herd of Angora goats
Chen Shui-bian	Honey – Maltese; Yung-ko (勇哥) – Taiwan Dog; Chen also publishes political commentary using Yung-ko as an alias.; Yi-kou (伊寇) – Shiba Inu
Ma Ying-jeou	Ma Hsiao-jeou (馬小九) – Mongrel
Tsai Ing-wen	Think Think (想想) and Ah Tsai (阿才) – two cats; Bella, Bunny, and Maru – three retired guide dogs; Lele (樂樂) – Jack Russell Terrier; retired search and rescue dog
Lai Ching-te	Banban (斑斑), an adopted stray dog with an amputated leg

== See also ==
- Canadian Parliamentary Cats
- Chief Mouser to the Cabinet Office, United Kingdom
- Hermitage cats in Saint Petersburg, Russia
- Pets of Vladimir Putin
- Paddles, First Cat of New Zealand
- Tibs the Great
- Pets of British royalty
- United States presidential pets
