= Pets of Vladimir Putin =

Vladimir Putin, the current president of Russia, has owned many dogs over time. His fondness for the species has led to dogs becoming a notable political gift in Russian diplomatic relations.

== List of dogs ==
When Putin took office, the Putin family had two poodles, Tosya and Rodeo. They reportedly stayed with his ex-wife Lyudmila after their divorce.

=== Konni (1999–2014) ===
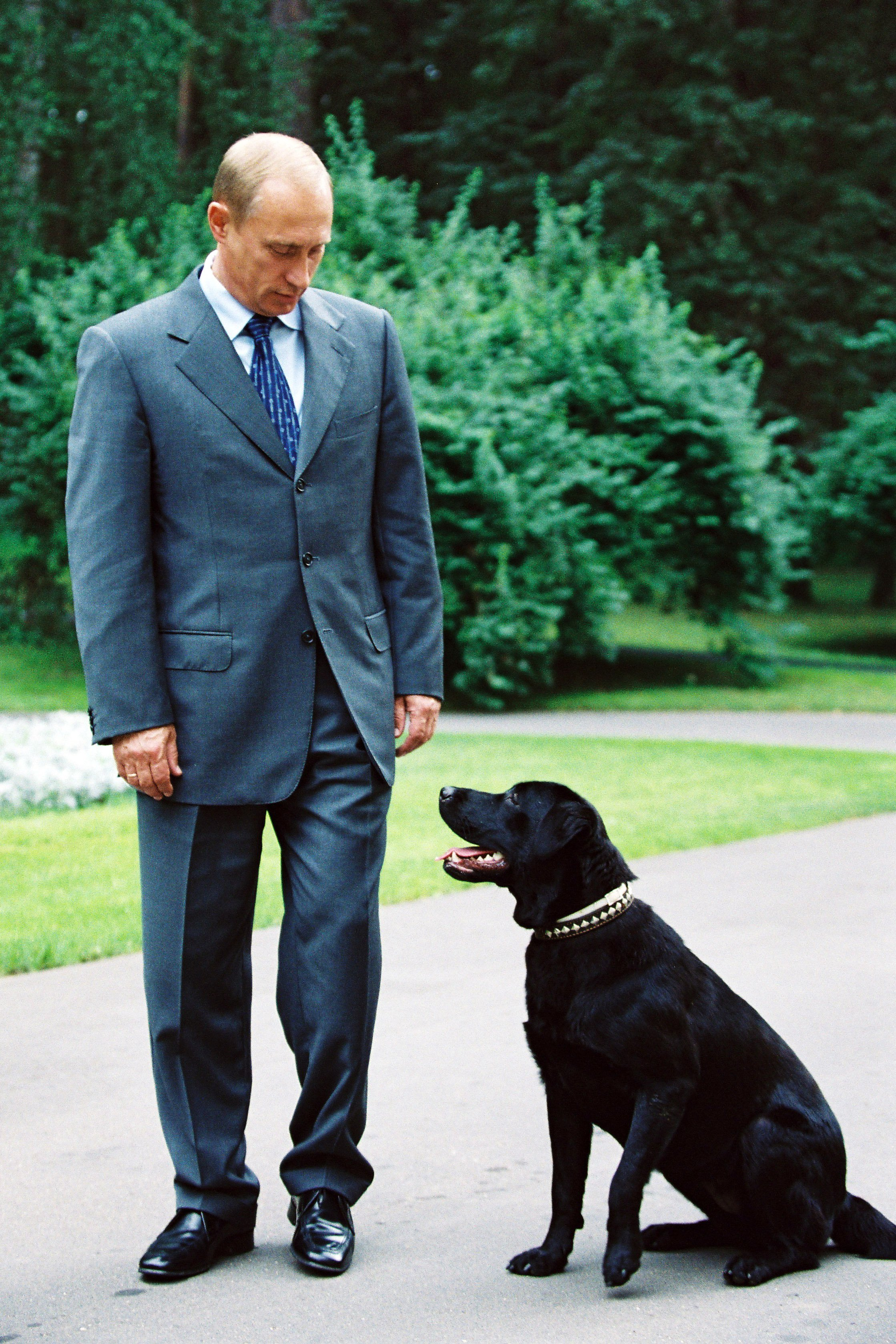
Putin with Konni in 2001

Konni (1999–2014) was a female black Labrador Retriever. Konni was born in 1999 and presented to Putin in December 2000. Konni was often seen at Putin's side, and was sometimes allowed to attend meetings when he greeted world leaders during visits to Russia.

During a meeting with Angela Merkel, German Chancellor at the time, in 2007 in Putin's home in Sochi, Konni attended the meeting. Merkel, who was bitten by a dog in 1995, was seen freezing up as Konni sniffed her. Merkel later stated of the incident that: "He's afraid of his own weakness. Russia has nothing, no successful politics or economy. All they have is this". Putin himself said in 2016 to the German newspaper Bild, that he had no intention of scaring Merkel and that he had apologized to her.

Putin was being updated on the progress of the Russian Global Navigation Satellite System (GLONASS) in 2007 when he inquired whether he would be able to buy a device hooked into GLONASS that would allow him to keep track of his dog, Konni. The collar was demonstrated on Konni on 17 October 2008, thus making Konni the first recipient of a GLONASS-enabled pet collar.

=== Buffy (2010–present) ===
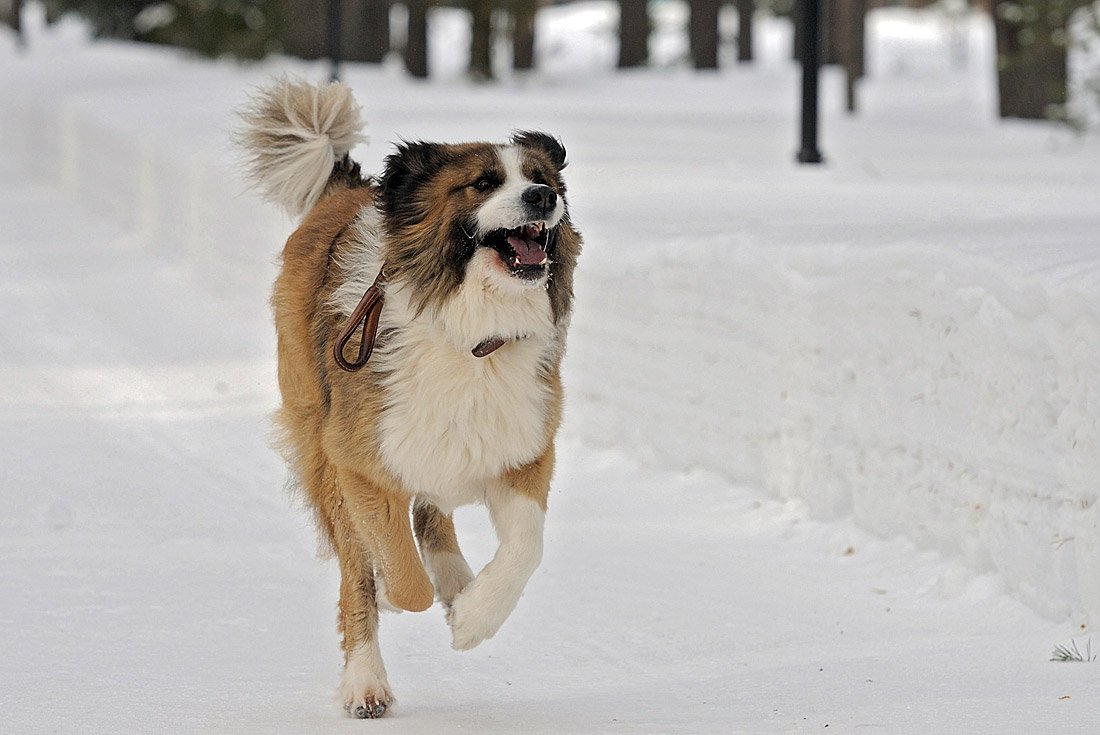
Buffy in 2013

Buffy, a caramel and white Bulgarian male 10-week-old shepherd Karakachan dog, was given to Putin during a visit to Bulgaria in November 2010 by Bulgarian Prime Minister Boyko Borisov. The name 'Buffy' was chosen by a five-year-old boy during a nationwide competition.

=== Yume (2012–2025) ===
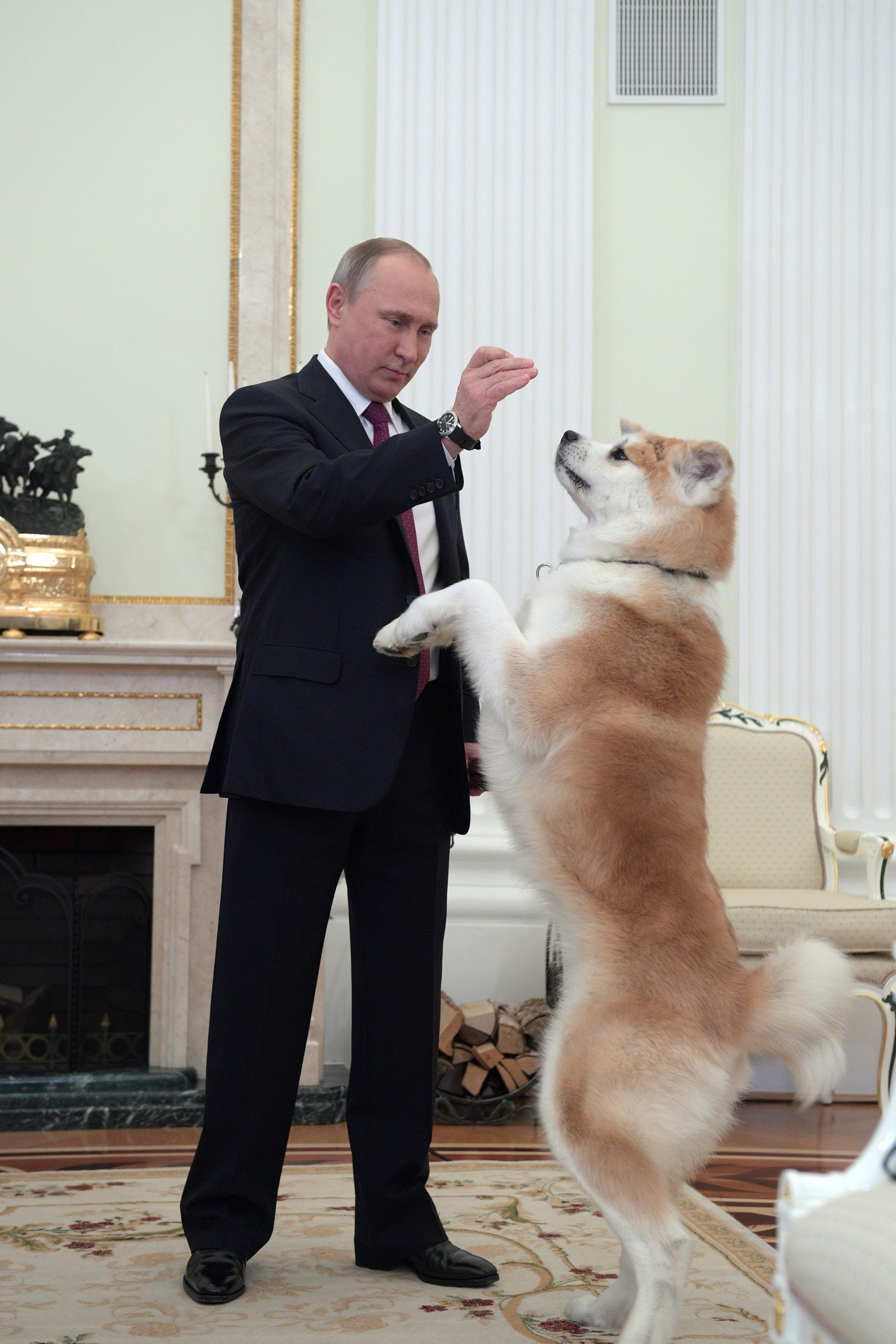
Putin with Yume in 2016

Yume, a 3-month-old female Akita puppy, arrived in Moscow from Tokyo, Japan, in July 2012, as the Akita Prefecture's gift to show gratitude for assistance from Russia after the 2011 Tōhoku earthquake and tsunami. 'Yume' means 'dream' in Japanese.

In 2016, the Japanese government offered Putin a male Akita puppy as a companion for Yume, but this gift was declined. Yume died of old age in 2025.

=== Verny (2017–present) ===
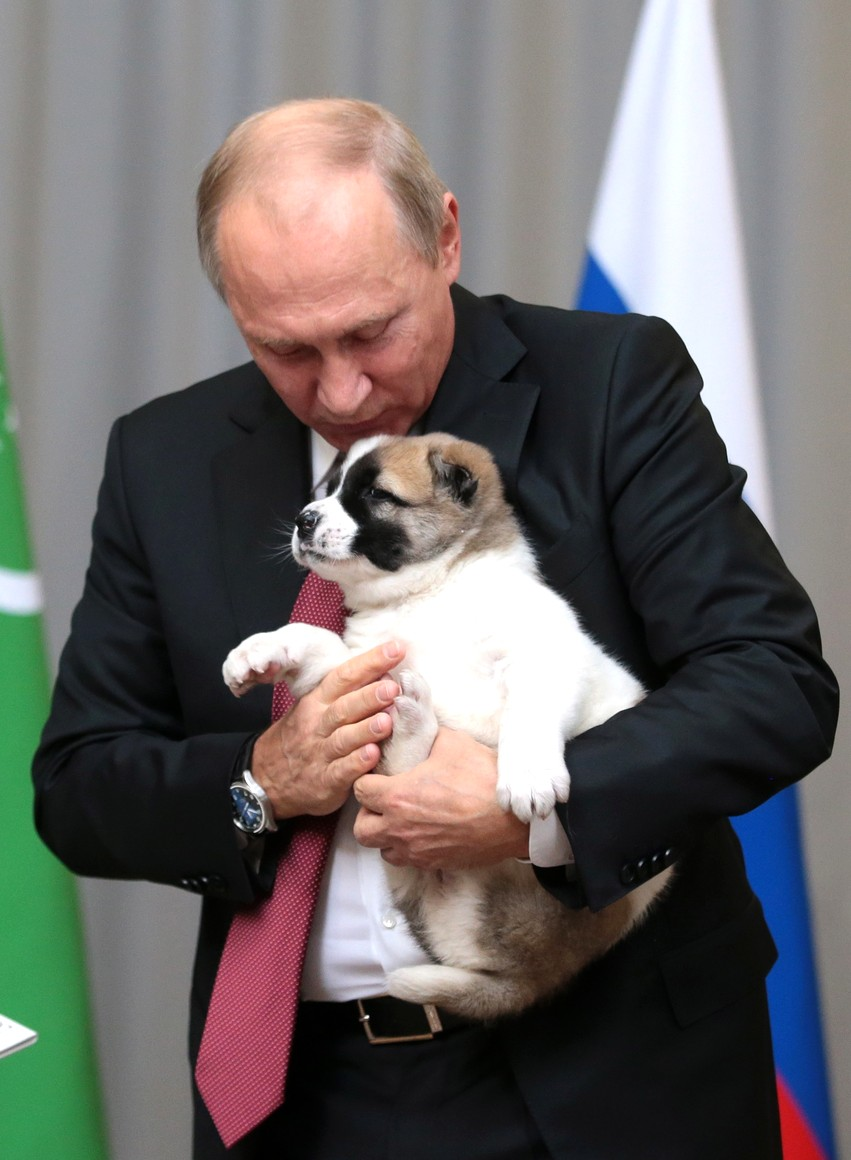
Putin with Verny as a puppy in 2017

Verny was a 65th birthday gift from Gurbanguly Berdimuhamedow, president of Turkmenistan, during a meeting in Sochi in October 2017. The puppy is an Alabai, a top Turkmen-bred variety of the Central Asia shepherd dog. 'Verny' means 'faithful' or 'loyal' in Russian.

=== Pasha (2019–present) ===
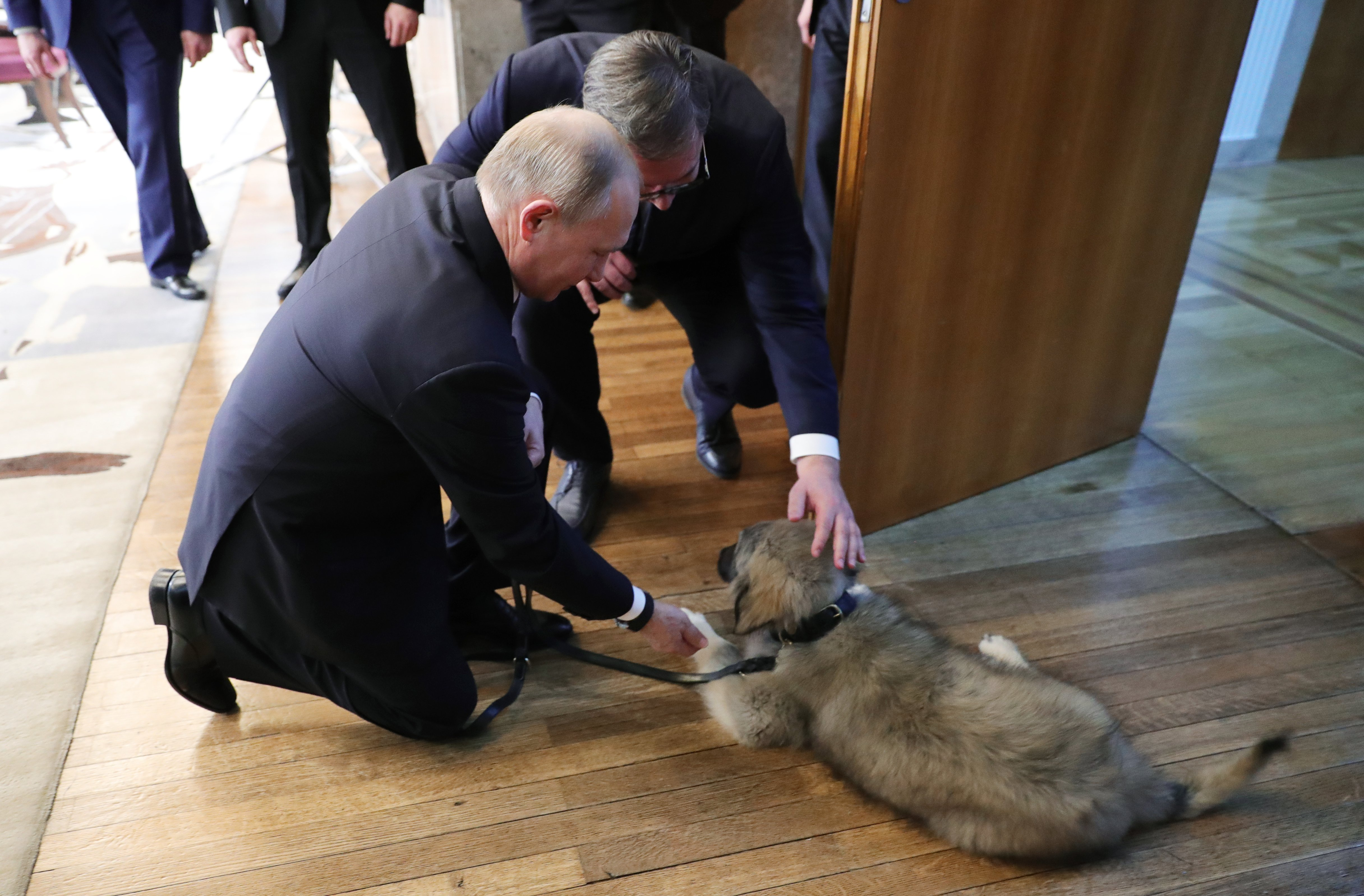
Vučić presenting Putin with Pasha in 2019

Pasha (Serbian Cyrillic: Паша) is a Šarplaninac puppy that was given to Vladimir Putin from Serbian president Aleksandar Vučić during an official visit in January 2019.

=== Unknown (2024–present) ===
Two seemingly adult dogs of the North Korean Pungsan breed were given to Vladimir Putin by Kim Jong Un on a visit Putin made to Pyongyang in June 2024. This shows the growing view among international diplomats that canines represent a suitable gift for the Russian head of state. However, Vladimir Putin has rejected these gifts on occasion, making Kim Jong-Un's gift especially significant for the geopolitical relationship between Russia and North Korea since he accepted the gift.

== See also ==
- List of individual dogs
- Canadian Parliamentary Cats
- Chief Mouser to the Cabinet Office, United Kingdom
- Hermitage cats in Saint Petersburg, Russia
- Tibs the Great
- Cats of former Taiwanese President Tsai Ing-wen
- United States Presidential Pets
- Pets of British royalty
