= Millie (dog) =

Pet English Springer Spaniel of Barbara and George H. W. Bush

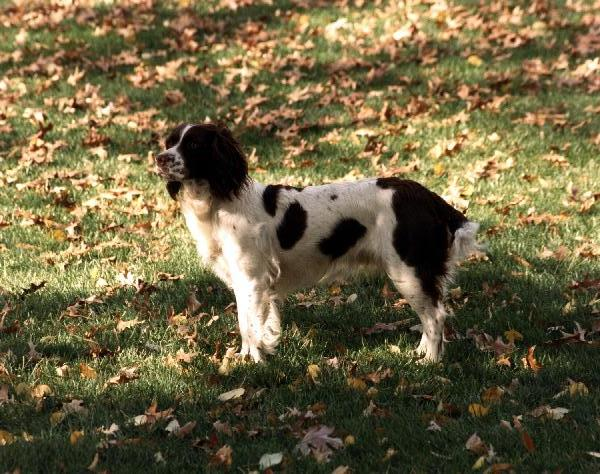
- Species: Canis lupus familiaris
- Breed: English Springer Spaniel
- Sex: Female
- Born: January 12, 1985
- Died: May 19, 1997 (aged 12); Kennebunkport, Maine, U.S.
- Known for: Pet of the First Family of the United States
- Predecessor: Rex
- Successor: Buddy
- Owner: George H. W. Bush
- Offspring: Ranger, Spot Fetcher
- Appearance: Brown and white fur

Mildred "Millie" Kerr Bush (January 12, 1985 – May 19, 1997) was the pet English Springer Spaniel of Barbara and George H. W. Bush. She was named for Mildred Caldwell Kerr, a long-time friend of the Bushes, which is also the name of Kerr's granddaughter, Millie Kerr.

Millie was referred to as "the most famous dog in White House history." Bush mentioned her in a speech during his 1992 bid for re-election, saying "My dog Millie knows more about foreign affairs than these two bozos" in reference to opposition candidates Bill Clinton and Al Gore.

Millie is credited as the author of Millie's Book, which was released in August 1990 and reached No. 1 on the New York Times bestseller nonfiction list that same year. In 1989, Millie gave birth to a litter of six puppies with the assistance of U.S. Army veterinarian Stephen Caldwell, including Spot Fetcher and Ranger, who became President George H. W. Bush's dog. Ranger was euthanized in April 1993 due to cancer. Spot would later become another presidential pet when George W. Bush moved into the White House.

Millie was portrayed in an episode of Murphy Brown as well as an episode of Wings and Who's the Boss?. Millie also made a cameo appearance in The Simpsons 1996 episode "Two Bad Neighbors" in a scene where the former President Bush is jogging with some of his new neighbors.

Millie died of pneumonia in 1997 at age 12 at the Bush Compound in Kennebunkport, Maine.

A dog park in Houston, Texas is named after Millie.

== See also ==
- Sully (dog), a dog owned by Bush later in life
- United States presidential pets
- List of individual dogs

Honorary titles
Preceded by Rex (Ronald Reagan's; Cavalier King Charles Spaniel)	White House pet dog January 20, 1989 – January 20, 1993	Succeeded by Buddy (Bill Clinton's; Labrador Retriever) (December 1997)
