= Scott Fletcher (baseball) =

American baseball player (born 1958)

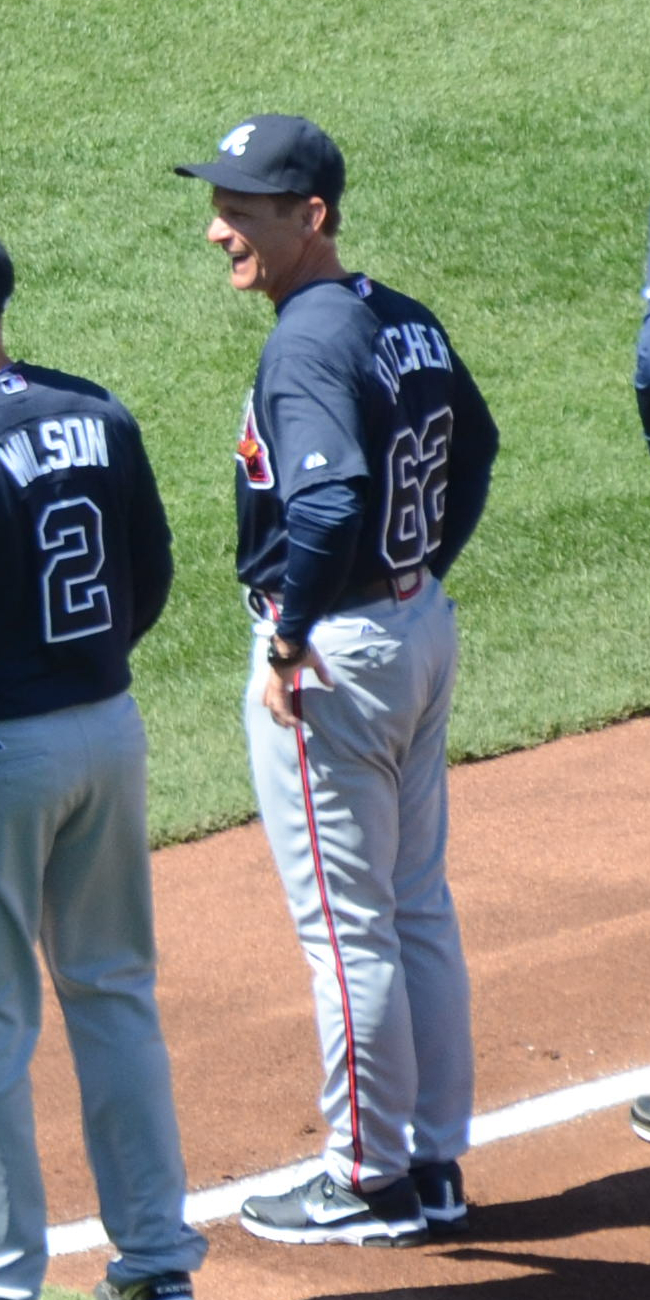
- Fletcher as coach for the Atlanta Braves in 2012
- Shortstop / Second baseman
- Born: July 30, 1958 (age 68); Fort Walton Beach, Florida, U.S.
- Batted: Right Threw: Right

MLB debut
- April 25, 1981, for the Chicago Cubs

Last MLB appearance
- September 29, 1995, for the Detroit Tigers

MLB statistics
- Batting average: .262
- Home runs: 34
- Runs batted in: 510
- Stats at Baseball Reference

Teams
- Chicago Cubs (1981–1982); Chicago White Sox (1983–1985); Texas Rangers (1986–1989); Chicago White Sox (1989–1991); Milwaukee Brewers (1992); Boston Red Sox (1993–1994); Detroit Tigers (1995)

Scott Brian Fletcher (born July 30, 1958) is an American former professional baseball player who played shortstop and second base in Major League Baseball from 1981 to 1995. Fletcher is related to Michael Barrett, who also played for the Chicago Cubs. One of his daughters is sportscaster Brooke Fletcher. Former MLB infielder Gordon Beckham and current MLB infielder Jake Cronenworth are his sons-in-law. Fletcher graduated from Wadsworth High School in Wadsworth, Ohio, in 1976.

== Playing career ==
Fletcher was signed by the Chicago Cubs in the 1979 amateur draft and made his major league debut with the team in 1981. After two years in a limited role, the Cubs traded Fletcher to their intercity rival, the Chicago White Sox in 1983. With the emergence of Ozzie Guillén in 1985, Fletcher was traded to the Texas Rangers at the end of the 1985 season. In 1986 he hit .300 (15th best in the American League) for the Rangers and was named the American League Player of the Month for July. In 1988, Fletcher became the first professional athlete in the Dallas/Fort Worth area to earn more than $1 million a year. After a slow start to the 1989 season, which saw him bat only .239 through 83 games, Fletcher was traded back to the Chicago White Sox at the trade deadline. Fletcher would split the remaining seasons of his career with the White Sox, Milwaukee Brewers, Boston Red Sox, and Detroit Tigers. He retired in 1995.

When reflecting on Fletcher's playing career, Bill James noted that Fletcher "didn't do anything exceptionally well" and that he mainly "filled a slot", though he ranked him the 85th best shortstop of all time.

== Coaching career ==
After retiring in 1995, Fletcher became the manager for the minor league Charleston RiverDogs in 1997. He later became an assistant coach at Emory University from 1999 to 2004. Fletcher became the Colorado Rockies' infield coordinator in 2009. He was hired as an assistant hitting coach to Greg Walker on October 21, 2011. Fletcher left the Braves at the end of the 2014 season. Fletcher served as a minor league instructor for the Detroit Tigers from 2015 to 2020, before working within the KBO League's SSG Landers organization.

== Legacy ==
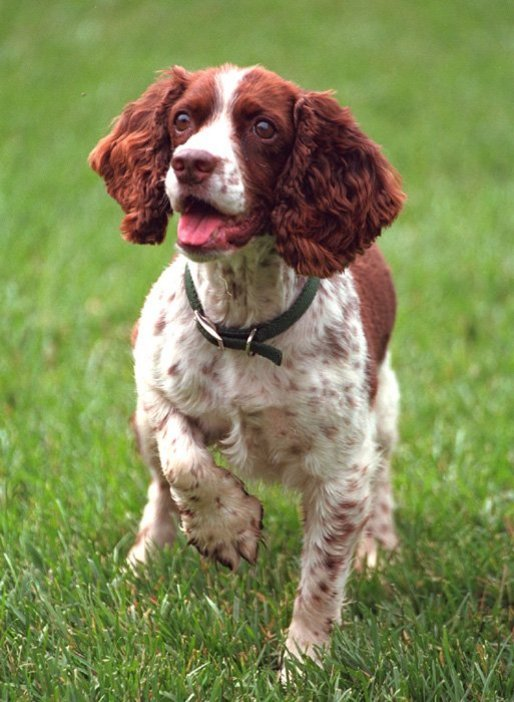
George W. Bush named his dog Spot Fetcher after Fletcher.

George W. Bush named his dog Spot Fetcher after Fletcher while Bush was the owner of the Texas Rangers. The dog, an English Springer Spaniel, remained with the Bushes throughout George W. Bush's term as Governor of Texas (1995–2000) but died in 2004 during Bush's first term as US President.
