= Rancho del Cielo =

President Ronald Reagan's ranch and vacation home

- "Reagan Ranch" "Western White House"
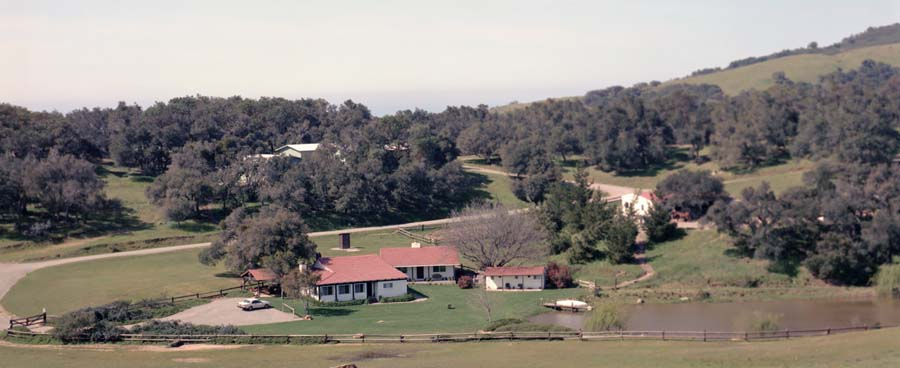

- Location within California
- 34.530478°N 120.075932°W
- Location: Santa Ynez Mountains, Santa Barbara County, California

History
- Built: 1872
- Original use: Vacation home of Ronald and Nancy Reagan

Site notes
- Elevation: 2,240 feet (680 m)
- Area: 688 acres (278 ha)
- Architectural styles: California ranch and Adobe
- Owner: Young America's Foundation
- Website: yaf.org/ronaldreagan/

Rancho del Cielo is a ranch located atop the Santa Ynez Mountain range northwest of Santa Barbara, California. For more than 20 years, it was the vacation home of Ronald and Nancy Reagan.

The 688-acre (278 ha) ranch's Spanish name translates to Sky's Ranch or Heaven's Ranch in English. In 1974, Reagan's family purchased the ranch, and he himself frequented the ranch throughout his presidency. The ranch is currently owned and operated by the Young America's Foundation.

== History ==
The ranch was originally named Rancho de los Picos after José Jesús Pico, a descendant of Santiago de la Cruz Pico who arrived with the Anza Expedition in 1776, who homesteaded it and built the original adobe house in 1871. The Pico family owned the ranch until 1941, when Joe, one of Jose Pico's sons, sold it to Santa Barbara County surveyor Frank Flournoy for $6,000 (equal to $131,300 today). In turn, he sold the ranch to Ray and Rosalie Cornelius, who then purchased additional land for the property.

Ronald Reagan's family owned a ranch in the Santa Monica Mountains that was much closer to their home in Bel Air, Los Angeles. The Reagans sold that ranch to a movie company and it is now part of Malibu Creek State Park. The Reagans then bought the ranch from the Corneliuses for about $527,000 in 1974 (equal to approximately $3,569,468.28 in 2026 adjusted for inflation) when his second term as governor of California was nearing an end. The estate contains a pond called Lake Lucky, stables and a barn for horses, and a 1,500 ft² (139 m²) house furnished with 1970s-style furniture. The ranch is located in a remote area on the crest of the Santa Ynez Mountains overlooking the Gaviota Coast. The nearest highway on the ocean side of the mountains is U.S. Route 101, with Solvang, California being the nearest community on the inland side of the mountains.

Reagan spent vacations during his presidency at the ranch, which became known as the Western White House. He signed the Economic Recovery Tax Act of 1981 at the ranch and at various times hosted British prime minister Margaret Thatcher, Queen Elizabeth II and Soviet leader Mikhail Gorbachev. Due to its connection to Reagan, Rancho del Cielo has also been called the "Reagan Ranch". After leaving the presidency in 1989, the Reagans moved to a home in Bel Air, but kept the ranch as a retreat.

Because of his Alzheimer's disease, Reagan last visited the ranch in 1995. Nancy last visited in 1998, before selling the property to the Young America's Foundation, a conservative group which preserves it today as "a living monument to Reagan's ideas, values, and lasting accomplishments." Although the ranch is closed to the public, the foundation offers students and supporters the opportunity to visit the property.

== Burials ==
After Reagan left office, his Cavalier Rex lived to the age of 13 with the Reagan family before being euthanised after developing an enlarged heart due to mitral valve disease. He is interred at Rancho del Cielo.

== In popular culture ==
The ranch appears in the 127th episode of California's Gold.

== Gallery ==
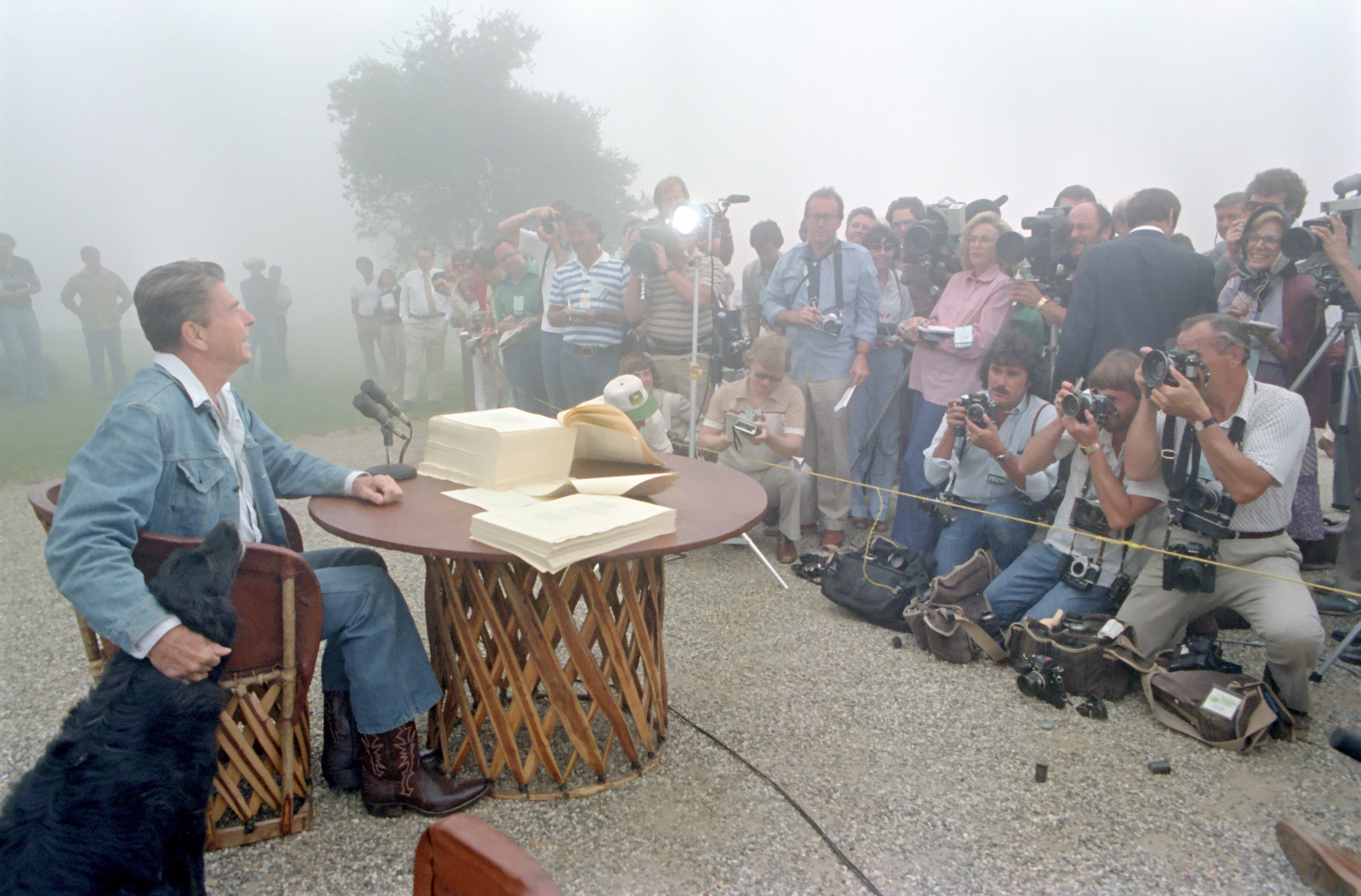
President Reagan signing the Economic Recovery Tax Act of 1981 in front of the press

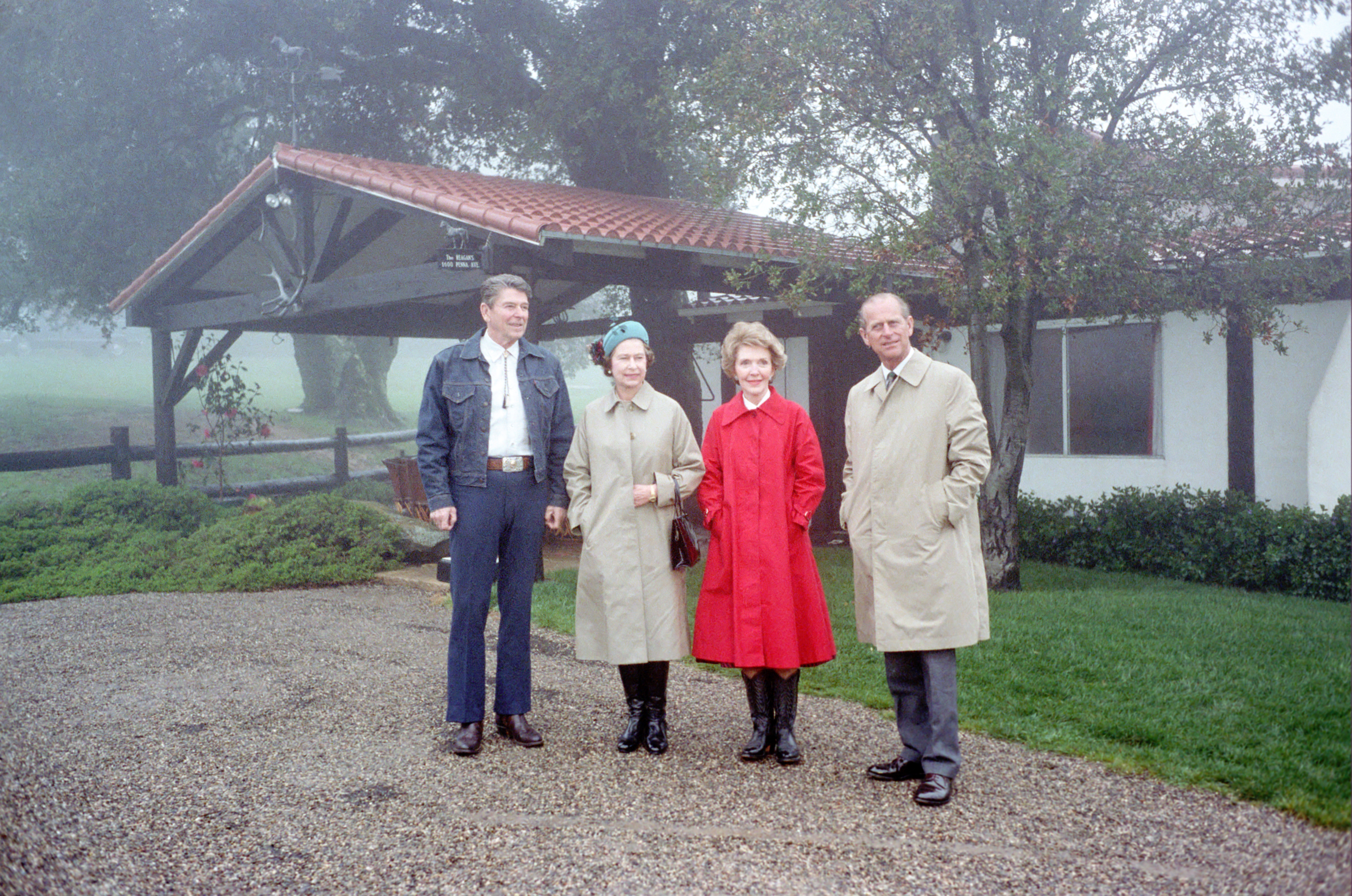
The Reagans with Elizabeth II and Prince Philip, Duke of Edinburgh, 1983

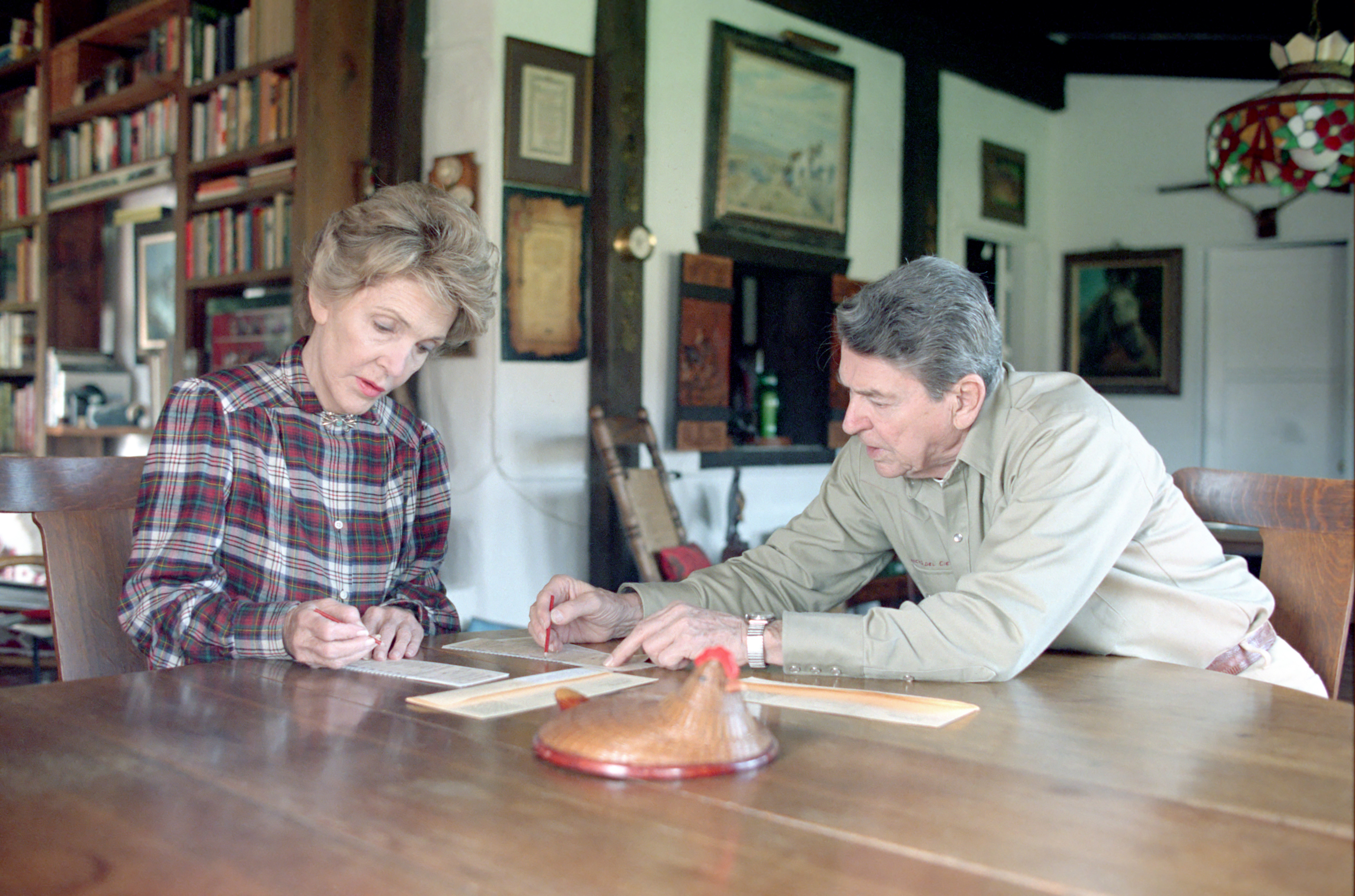
Ronald and Nancy in the dining room, 1988

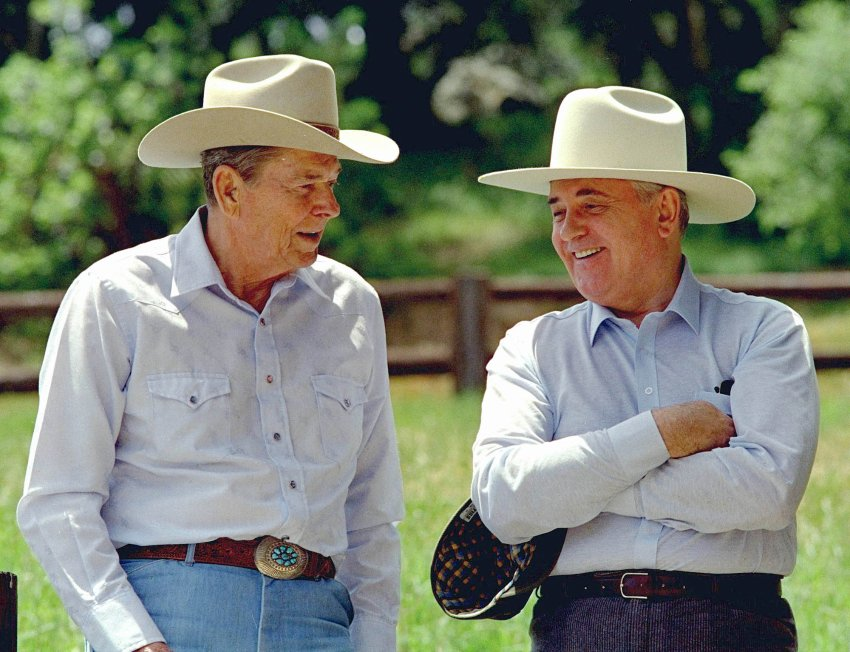
Gorbachev a year after the fall of the Soviet Union visiting former president Reagan, both in western wear, 1992

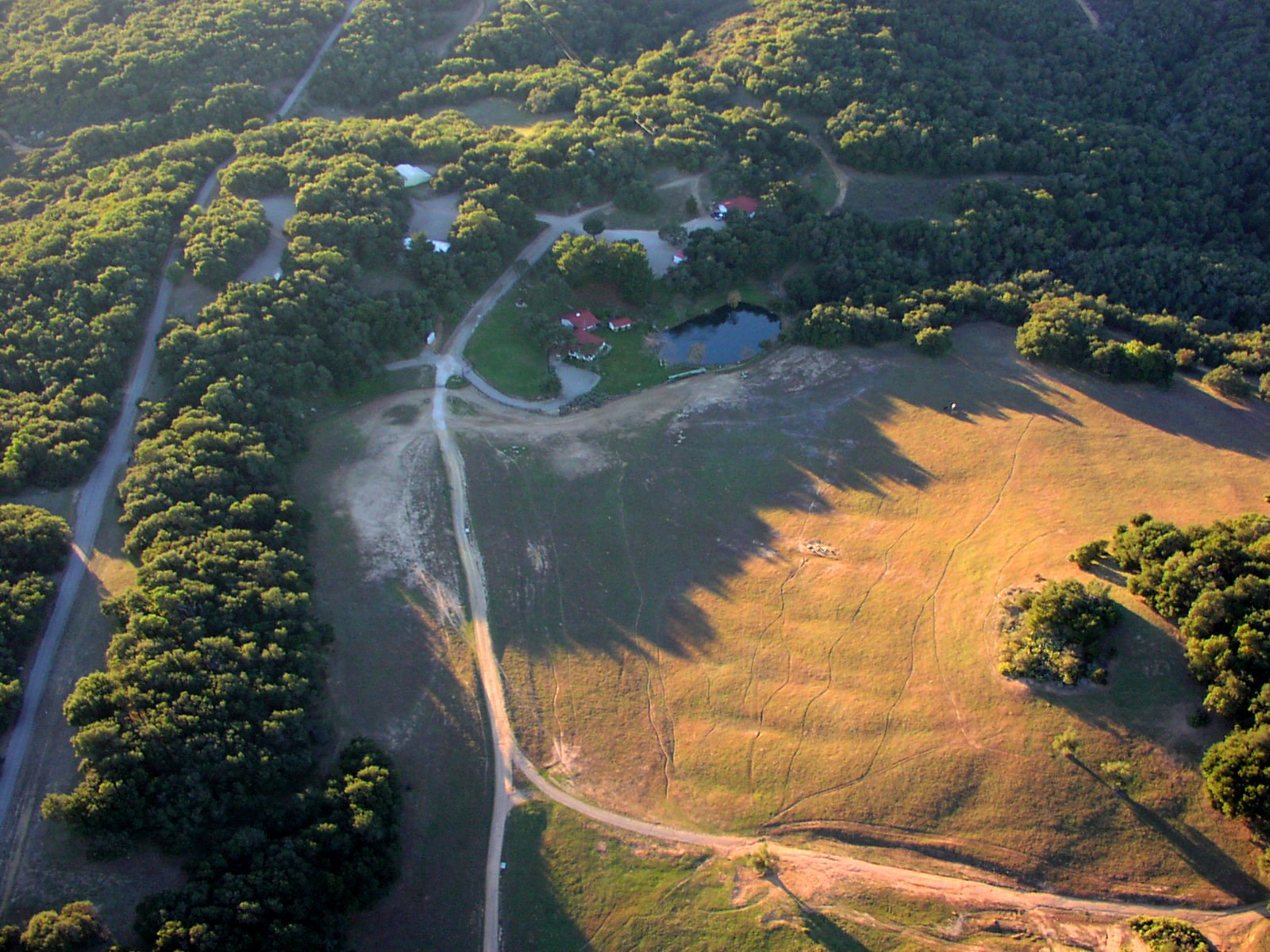
Aerial view of the ranch with Lake Lucky on the bottom right side, 2009

== See also ==
- List of residences of presidents of the United States
