= Rex (Ronald Reagan's dog) =

Pet of the First Family in the 1980s

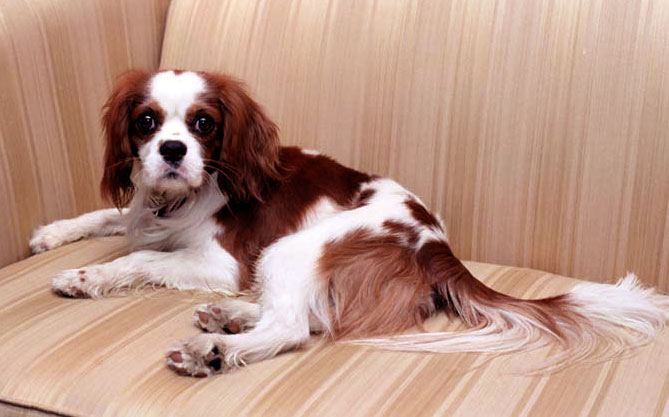
- Rex in 1986
- Species: Canis familiaris
- Breed: Cavalier King Charles Spaniel
- Sex: Male
- Born: December 16, 1984; Greenwich, Connecticut, U.S.
- Died: August 31, 1998 (aged 13); Santa Barbara, California, U.S.
- Cause of death: Euthanasia
- Resting place: Rancho del Cielo
- Nationality: American
- Known for: Pet of the First Family of the United States
- Predecessor: Lucky
- Successor: Millie
- Owners: Ronald Reagan and Nancy Reagan
- Appearance: Blenheim (Ruby and white fur)
- Named after: Rex Scouten

Rex (December 16, 1984 – August 31, 1998) was a Cavalier King Charles Spaniel owned by Ronald Reagan and his wife Nancy during his second term as President of the United States.

== Early life ==
Rex was bred by dog breeder Irene Murphy of Greenwich, Connecticut. His registered name was Martlet-Or Worcester. Conservative commentator William F. Buckley, Jr. purchased littermate brother Freddy from the breeder and later arranged for President Reagan to purchase one-year-old Rex and give Rex as a Christmas present to his wife Nancy on December 6, 1985. The White House's previous canine occupant, the Reagans' Bouvier des Flandres named Lucky, had grown too large and had been moved to Reagan's Rancho del Cielo estate in California the preceding Thanksgiving. Rex was named after Rex Scouten, White House Chief Usher. One of Rex's first acts that week was helping to throw the switch that lit the National Christmas Tree.

== Residency at the White House ==
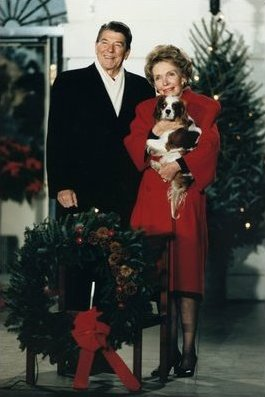
Rex with the Reagans at Christmas

Rex lived in the White House from that Christmas until Reagan left office in 1989, once gaining headlines when he underwent a tonsillectomy at an undisclosed veterinary hospital. Rex was treated to a lavishly decorated doghouse built by the Washington Children's Museum, which included framed portraits of Ronald and Nancy and red window draperies. It was designed by Theo Hayes, and actress Zsa Zsa Gabor reportedly conducted a dedication ceremony for the new structure.

Nackey Loeb, wife of publisher William Loeb III, advised the Reagans to hire a dog trainer for Rex, as she felt it was detrimental to Nancy Reagan's image to have the dog pull her around in front of the press. The President responded to Loeb, stating that Rex was still young and got easily excited when helicopters land on the White House lawn to the extent that "he believes Marine I is his personal dog basket". Rex was ultimately seen as being calmer than his predecessor Lucky, who is remembered for dragging Nancy Reagan across the White House lawn, while Rex was seen as being better behaved.

Reportedly, Rex took a disliking to the Lincoln Bedroom in the White House. Thought to possibly be haunted by the ghost of Abraham Lincoln, the dog would refuse to enter the room and sometimes would stand outside and bark through the doorway.

Rex's high-profile led in part to the sudden popularisation of the breed in America in the years following Reagan's presidency.

== Later life and legacy ==
As a leaving gift when Reagan departed, Rex was given a dog house resembling the White House, complete with a patch of carpet from Camp David.

After Reagan left office, Rex lived to the age of 13 with the Reagan family before being euthanised after developing an enlarged heart due to mitral valve disease. He is interred at Rancho del Cielo.

== See also ==
- United States presidential pets
- List of individual dogs

Honorary titles
Preceded by Lucky (Ronald Reagan's; Bouvier des Flandres)	White House pet dog December 6, 1985 – January 20, 1989	Succeeded by Millie (George H. W. Bush's; English Springer Spaniel)
