= Dorofei =

Cat who belonged to former Russian President Dmitry Medvedev

Dorofei (or Dorotheus Russian: Дорофей) (2004–2014) was a rare Neva Masquerade (Siberian breed) cat with blue eyes belonging to former Russian President Dmitry Medvedev and his wife Svetlana Medvedeva. Dorofei took over the title of First Pet from Vladimir Putin's black labrador Koni, when Medvedev was inaugurated on 7 May 2008.

== Early life ==
Dorofei was born in 2004. The Neva Masquerade breed comes from Saint Petersburg, however Dorofei was bred by the Great Hunter breeding company in Moscow. Svetlana Medvedeva bought Dorofei from the breeders as a kitten, and took him back to Saint Petersburg. Neva Masquerades with a good pedigree can cost up to twenty thousand Russian rubles.

Noviye Izvestiya reported that Dorofei once got into a fight with a cat belonging to Mikhail Gorbachev, who was Medvedev's neighbour. Dorofei lost the fight, and was put onto antibiotics for a month to help heal the injuries he sustained in the fight, and was also castrated to prevent a repeat incident. It was reported by Reuters that in the lead up to Medvedev's inauguration, the Russian media shied away from investigating his history, so they focused on Dorofei instead.

== In Kremlin ==
Russian media reported that Dorofei was a rather tough character, being independent and not following protocol. In June 2008, Russia issued a new non-currency banknote to delegates at the International Economic Forum in St. Petersburg, featuring Dorofei on one side and a famous local cat on the other side.

In November 2008, when Medvedev met with Taro Aso at the APEC meeting in Peru, Medvedev gave the Japanese Prime Minister a radio-controlled flying Doraemon toy for his son. It was reported at the same time that in Tokyo the idea of a cartoon film featuring the joint adventures of Doraemon and Dorofei were being discussed, in what the Japanese called an important step of rapprochement between Japan and Russia.

In July 2009, the US president Barack Obama and his wife met with Dorofei in Gorki during their visit to Russia.

== Death ==
On 4 February 2015, it was reported by Russian news source Sobesednik.ru that Dorofei had died along with President Vladimir Putin's dog, Konni.
