= Think Think and Ah Tsai =

Cats belonging to Tsai Ing-wen

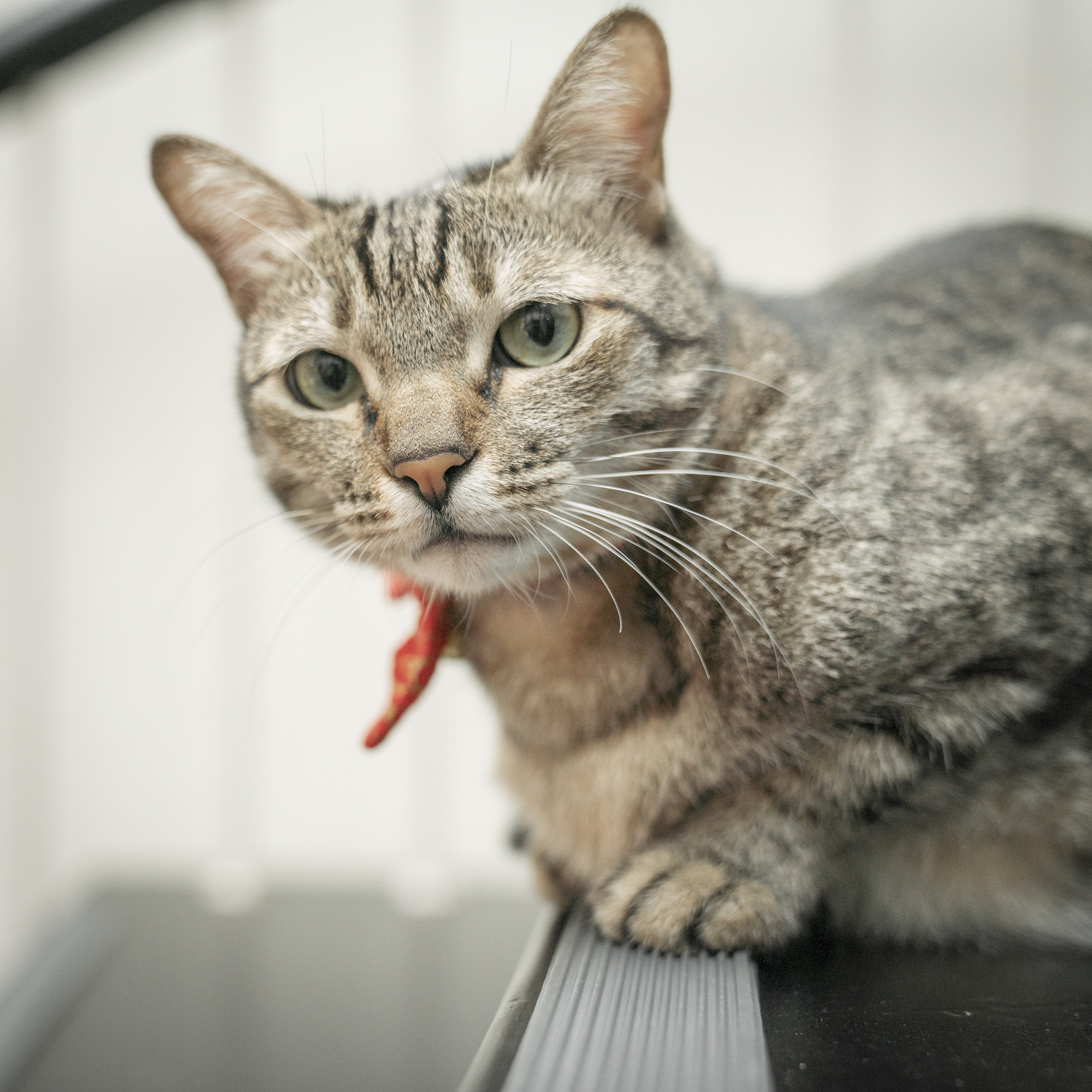
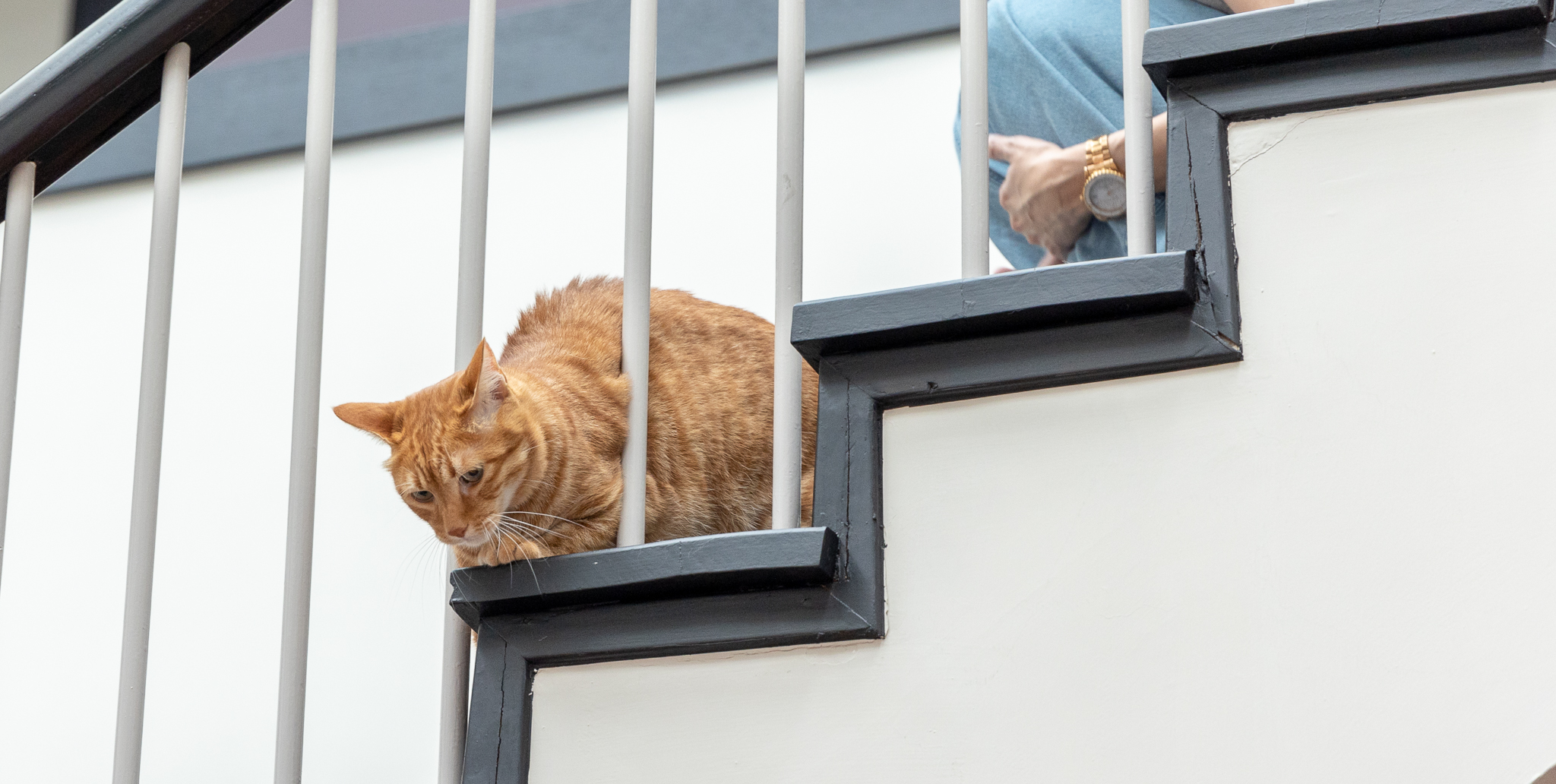
- Think Think Ah Tsai
- Other names: Xiangxiang, Cookie; Acai
- Species: House cats
- Breed: Tabby
- Sex: Female; Male
- Born: Taiwan
- Notable role: Companionship, election support
- Known for: Presidential cats
- Owner: Tsai Ing-wen
- Residence: Official Residence of the President (2016–2024)

Think Think (Chinese: 想想; pinyin: Xiǎngxiǎng) and Ah Tsai (阿才; Ācái) are two cats belonging to the former president of Taiwan, Tsai Ing-wen. Think Think is a female gray tabby, while Ah Tsai is a male ginger tabby. During Tsai’s presidency the cats became well-known public figures through social-media posts and election campaigning. Tsai later also adopted several dogs.

== Origins ==
Think Think was adopted by Tsai in 2012, after being brought to her as a homeless kitten by Democratic Progressive Party (DPP) legislator Hsiao Bi-khim. Hsiao had found the kitten on a muddy road by a railway station near Hualien after Typhoon Saola. Tsai named the kitten after "Thinking Taiwan" (Chinese: 想想論壇), an education foundation she was working on at the time.

Ah Tsai (meaning 'talent') was a farm cat and a gift from a friend during Tsai's presidential campaign. The cat was found near a pineapple field in Taitung County in eastern Taiwan.

Prior to her election as president, Tsai lived in a modest apartment with the two cats. Think Think was originally skinny, covered in mud and suffering from skin diseases but soon recovered under Tsai's care. Tsai has said that the cats generally get along well with each other but do fight occasionally.

== Public profile and media ==
During her presidency Tsai regularly posted social-media updates featuring the cats, which proved popular. During the COVID-19 pandemic in Taiwan, one post discouraged April Fools’ Day pranks involving false rumours about the pandemic, Tsai appeared with one of the cats and wrote that humour was fine “but we can’t make jokes about the pandemic, to avoid breaking the law.” When baseball resumed after partial lifting of lockdown restrictions, she posted a photo of herself watching a game at home with one of the cats. Images of the cats also appeared in the post-pandemic tourism hashtag #ThisAttackComeFromTaiwan alongside Taiwanese landscapes and bubble tea.

In 2019 Tsai posted pictures of Ah Tsai watching the Animal Channel and featured both cats in a Valentine’s Day message. Ahead of the 2020 election she urged supporters to ignore “fake news” about the cats’ health, stating they were fine. In July 2020 she visited the Hsinchu Animal Protection Education Park and encouraged citizens to adopt stray animals rather than buy pets.

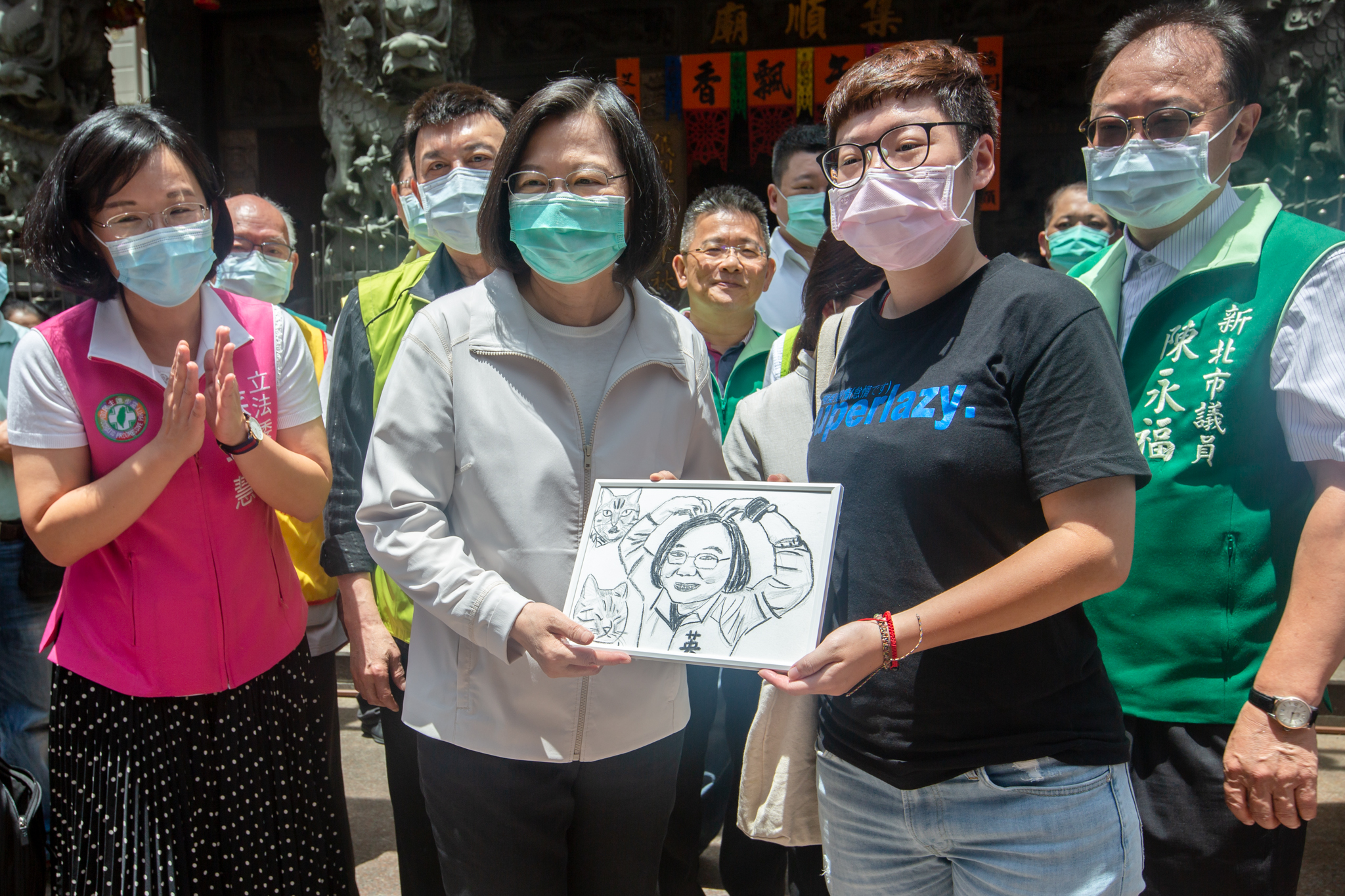
Tsai being presented with a picture of herself and her two cats.

Shortly after Tsai’s 2016 election a Xinhua article by PLA officer Wang Weixing criticised her as a single woman and therefore “emotional” and “erratic,” the piece provoked an outcry over sexism and was quickly withdrawn. Taiwanese activist magazine New Bloom described her as “an unorthodox politician… a female academic who loves cats and supports gay rights”. Gideon Rachman of the Financial Times noted that Tsai was one of two recent “cat-lovers” to rise to power (the other being Poland’s Jarosław Kaczyński).

In June 2016, while in Miami, Tsai met Taiwanese pitcher Wei-Yin Chen, who gave her feeding bowls for the two cats (and for the three dogs she was about to adopt).

== Election campaigns ==
=== 2015–2016 ===
Think Think and Ah Tsai featured prominently in Tsai’s 2015–2016 presidential campaign, in which the press sometimes called her “Cat Woman”. Cat-related Facebook posts received far more engagement than policy posts (likes up to 50 percent higher). A World Animal Day post of Ah Tsai receiving a vaccination attracted nearly 30,000 likes. The campaign produced the animated film Cat in a Paper Carton – Think Think, the cats also appeared in the policy book Light up Taiwan.

Young supporters especially liked the cats. A 2015 Chinese New Year video showed a grey tabby struggling in Tsai’s arms. Campaign material transformed Tsai and the cats into anime characters speaking Taiwanese Hokkien rather than Mandarin.

Davina Tham of the Taipei Times argued that Tsai personified Taiwanese attitudes toward women in power, citing the 2016 comic Presidential Slave to Cats (by “Stupid Sheep”) and Wei Tsung-cheng’s Conqueror of the Seas. After the election victory, Chunghwa Post issued a special stamp featuring people of diverse backgrounds together with a dog and a cat, it was the first Taiwanese stamp not to show the national flag.

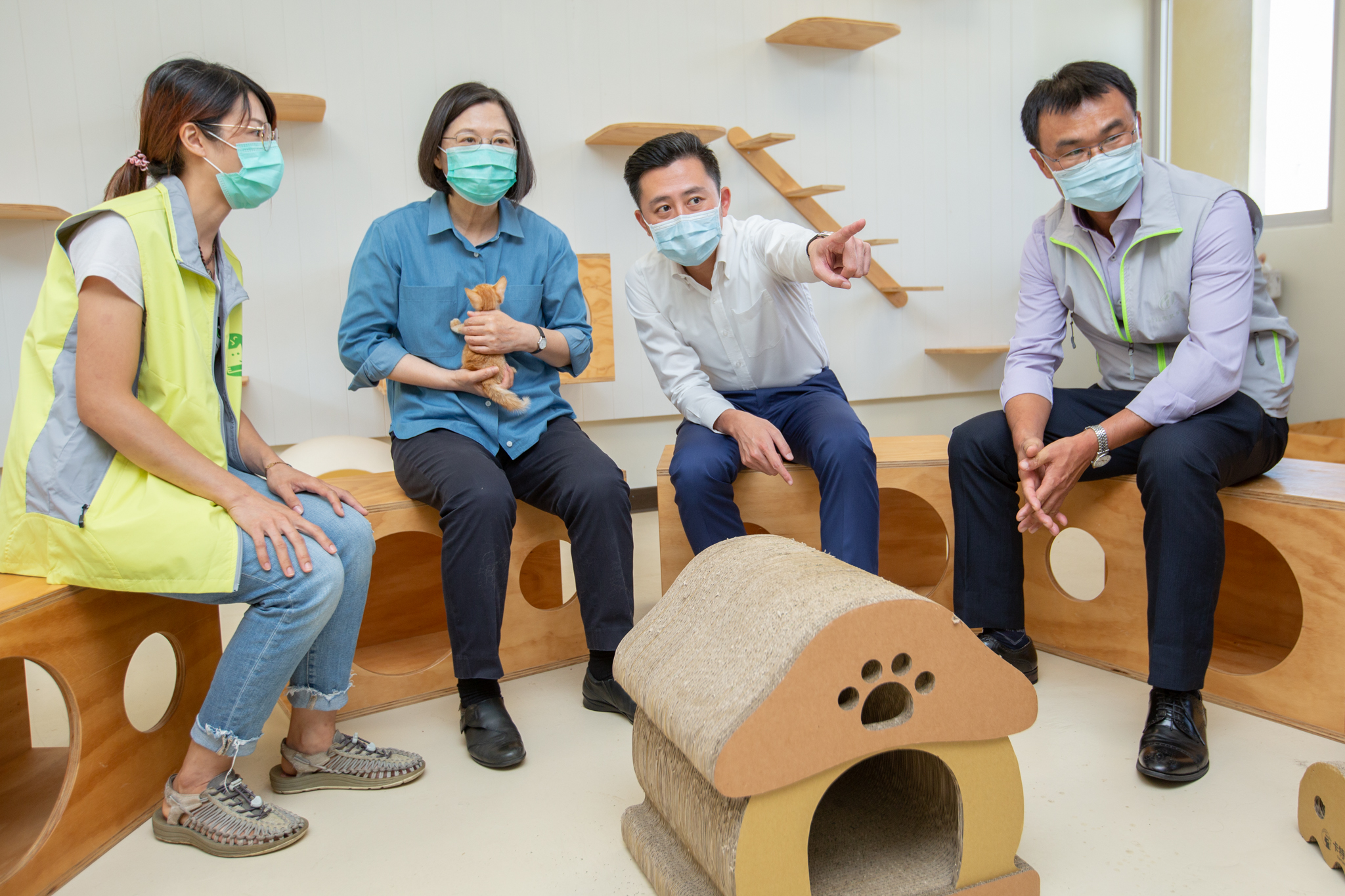
Tsai visiting the Hsinchu Animal Protection Education Park in July 2020

=== 2020 ===
The re-election campaign again used both cat and dog imagery, including videos of Tsai with the two cats and three dogs. Taiwan News called one of the cats the “purrfect” running mate, supporters wore “slave to cats” T-shirts, and a campaign store offered selfies with the dogs.

Tsai appeared in pink cat ears in a DPP rally advertisement shared by Freddy Lim. Other material included a Taiwan-shaped pillow and a hot-sauce pun on her “Hot Taiwanese Girl” nickname. The Chinese Communist Party mocked a cosplay “magic girls” avatar she posted, but observers such as the ABC’s Bill Birtles noted that the “cute” style coexisted with a harder political edge, the New Daily called her Taiwan’s “Iron Cat Lady”.

Other candidates also used animal or anime imagery (e.g., Han Kuo-yu with his Shiba Inu, Lii Wen with mussel-wing props). Digital Minister Audrey Tang described the trend as a “coming out” of digital subcultures. After Tsai’s re-election the Hong Kong Cat Society congratulated her, calling the victory “a win for cats”.

== Feline culture in Taiwan ==
Cats are popular pets in Taiwan and their numbers have risen rapidly in recent years. The world’s first cat café, “Cat Flower Garden”, opened in Taipei in 1998, by 2016 a dedicated “Cathy Hotel” also existed. The Taiwanese cat-café concept later spread to Japan and elsewhere. The former mining town of Houtong is known as a “cat village” that attracts tourists with its large population of free-roaming cats.

== Other presidential pets ==
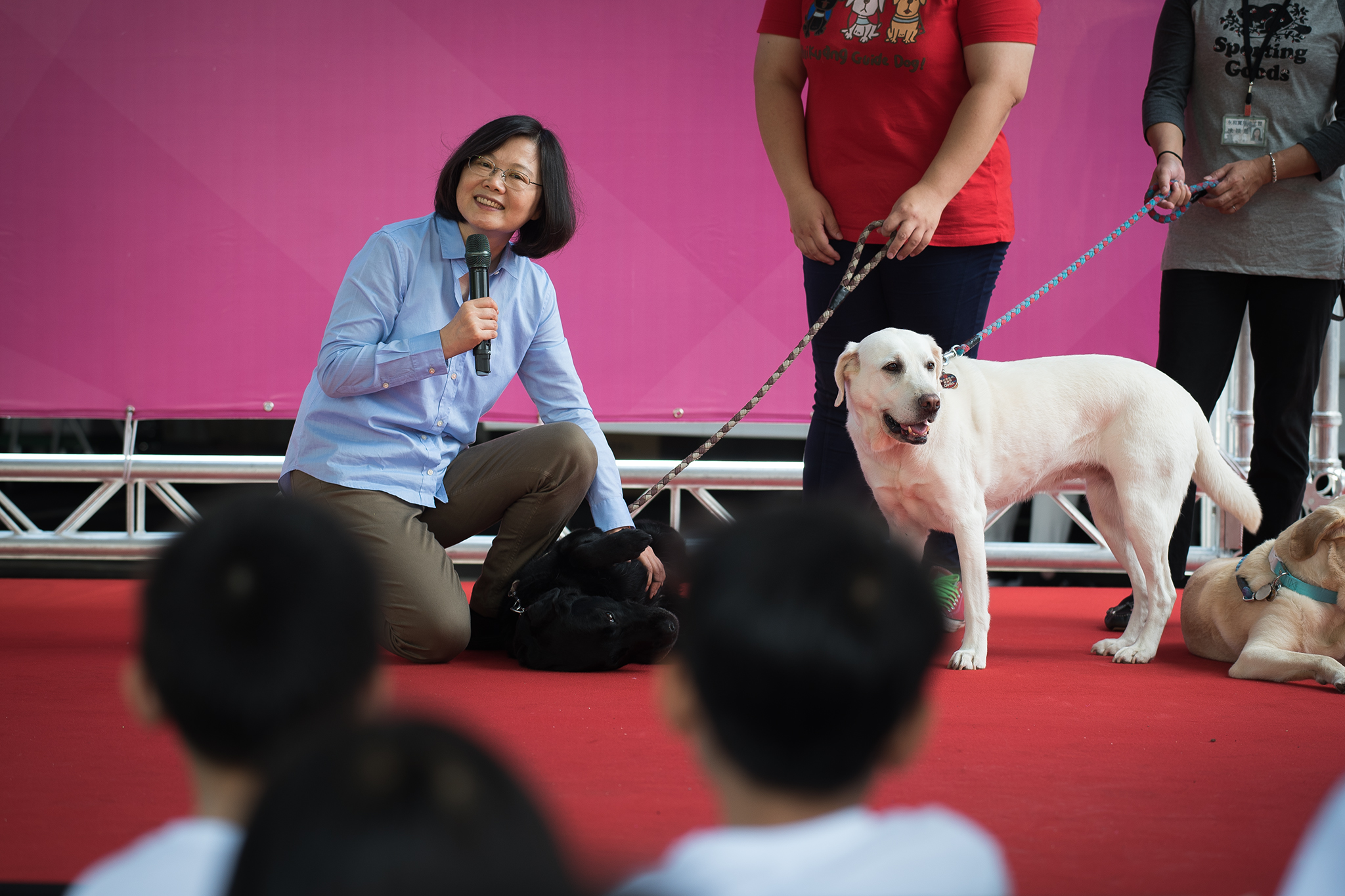
Tsai introducing the dogs to children at the Yongyou Residence Children's Club in 2017.

After her 2016 inauguration Tsai announced she would adopt three retired guide dogs once she moved into the official residence. Asked about possible conflict with the cats, she replied that the dogs “are very well trained and they can definitely get along with the cats”. Some commentators drew political parallels: Alex Lo in the South China Morning Post suggested the adoption was a positive sign for cross-strait relations, portraying Taiwanese as “cat people” and mainland Chinese as “dog people”. The Straits Times dismissed speculation of a “civil war” between the cats and dogs.

Tsai adopted the dogs (Bella, Bunny and Maru) in October 2016 at a ceremony organised by the Huikuang Guide Dog Foundation, where she pledged to improve accessibility for visually impaired people and their guide dogs. She described Bella as her favourite, Bunny as “elegant” and Maru as “timid”. Bella died in September 2023 and Maru in August 2024. Tsai later adopted two further dogs, Lele and Pineapple.

== See also ==
- List of Taiwanese presidential pets
- List of individual cats
