= Parliament Hill cat colony =

Former colony of stray cats in Ottawa

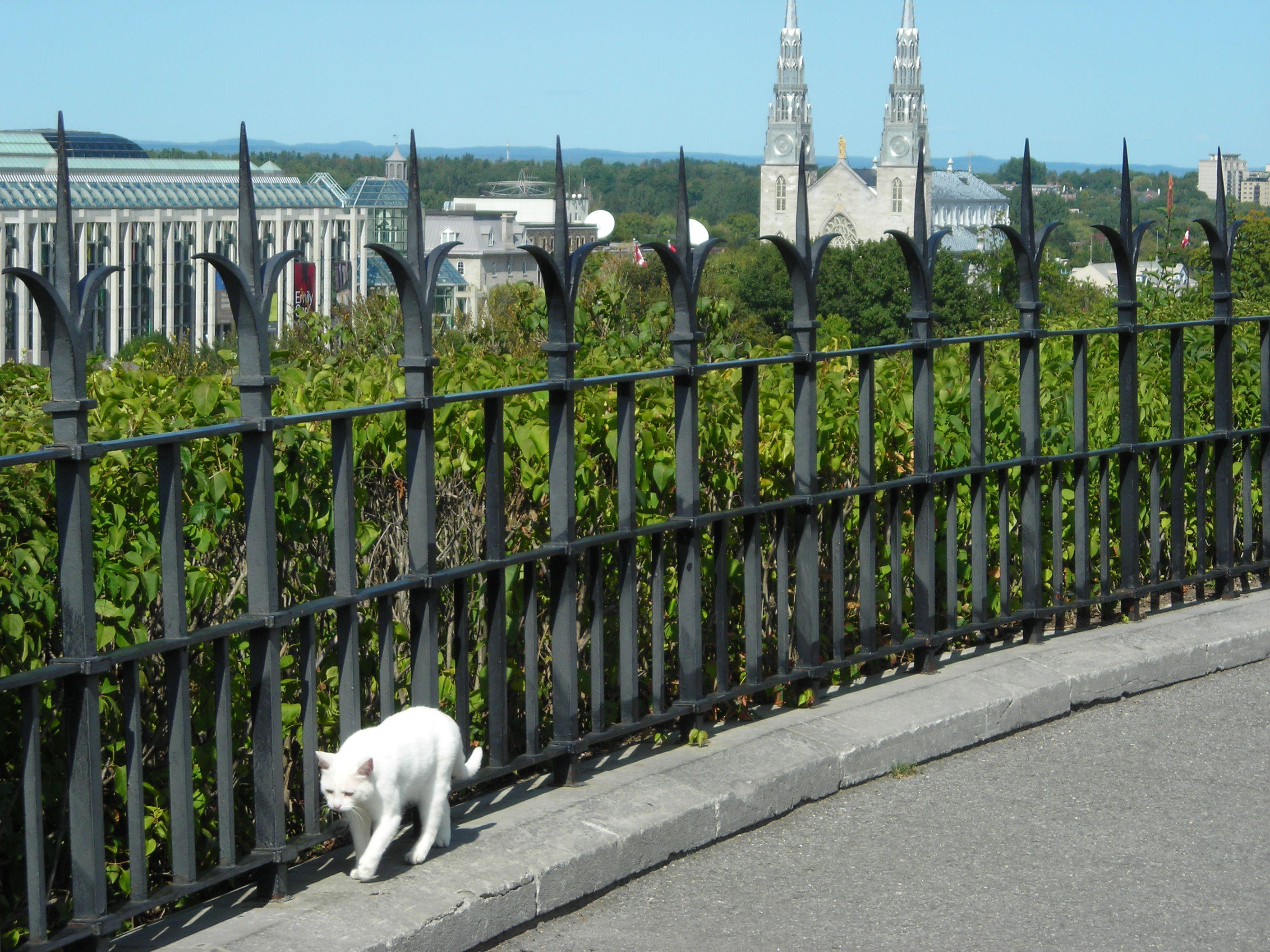
Thumbelina, one of the strays

The Parliament Hill cat colony was a group of stray cats living on Parliament Hill in Ottawa, Ontario, Canada, in a cat sanctuary set aside for them. The care of the cats and maintenance of the sanctuary was carried out by volunteers, and the effort was funded by donations. The colony was closed in January 2013 after the remaining cats were adopted into homes.

== History ==
Cats were brought into Parliament in 1924 to deal with a "mild plague of rats and mice in the basement of the then brand-new Centre Block." The numbers of rodents soon fell, but when the unneutered cats began to multiply, they were banished to the outdoors in the same year. Cats were employed in the Parliament Building to control the rodent population until 1955 when they were replaced by chemicals.

Mrs. Mabbs was one of several char ladies (cleaners) who brought bags of food for the cats and birds as early as the 1930s. Groundskeepers also fed the cats at various locations on the grounds until 1970, when Irène Desormeaux began feeding the cats at the location where the colony became established. She was joined by René Chartrand (born in 1921 in Hull, Quebec) in the mid-1980s, who took over when Desormeaux died in 1987.

In 1997, other volunteers joined to help Chartrand in the effort, including Brian Caines. In 2003, Klaus Gerken joined the team, and along with Caines, organized a team of other volunteers. That same year, Chartrand received the Heroes for Animals Award from the Humane Society of Canada "recognizing Rene's lifetime achievement in caring for animals" over sixteen years at the cat sanctuary. One of his contributions was the construction of shelters in the colony.

Gerken began to document the activities at the cat sanctuary on a blog in 2005, where he kept a list of resident cats and drop-offs. Chartrand retired from the sanctuary for health reasons in 2008 and died on December 7, 2014.

== The colony ==
The cat sanctuary was located west of the Centre Block and the statue of Alexander Mackenzie. The fence surrounding the colony was no obstacle to the cats and they were free to roam the grounds. Chartrand built the first set of cold weather shelters in the mid-1980s. The second set of structures were built in 1997, and resembled the houses of European settlers along the St. Lawrence. In winter the cats survived in their lodgings by grouping together for warmth. Raccoons, groundhogs, pigeons, and squirrels also partook of the benefits formally intended for the cats.

In 2003, when there were approximately 30 cats, the estimated annual cost of the colony was $6000. The cats received free inoculations and care from the local Alta Vista Animal Hospital. Purina, a pet care company, also donated food. The cats were spayed or neutered in the last ten to fifteen years of the sanctuary's operation, and the population slowly tapered off. Cats that were dropped off or found their way there were usually taken to the Ottawa Humane Society. As a result of this policy, by late 2012, only four cats remained. The last living cat from the colony was adopted in 2013 and named Coal. The cat was diagnosed with salivary gland cancer at 16 years of age. His owner started a fundraiser in 2024 to pay for his treatment and it went into remission. Coal died on July 8, 2025.

== Decline and closure ==
Pierre Berton said that in good weather, some 300 visitors a day found their way to the cat sanctuary. Journalists arrived, some from as far away as Venezuela, "and television crews turn up to record the political cat phenomenon, if not for posterity, at least for a few fleeting moments on the tube". Local dignitaries also visited the sanctuary. Former prime minister "Pierre Trudeau, who enjoyed his walks, used to wander by. Brian Mulroney always waved from his limousine window". Stephen Harper and Laureen Harper had some contact with the sanctuary volunteers, and Members of Parliament were known to drop by from time to time, among them former Deputy Prime Minister Herb Gray.

In 2013, the four remaining cats were adopted to homes, and in January 2013 the sanctuary closed at the volunteers' request. The structures were demolished by Public Works and Government Services Canada on January 12, 2013.

== In popular culture ==
Artist Gwendolyn Best created a number of paintings of the cats, which were exhibited at Ottawa's Orange Art Gallery in 2013. Some of her paintings are featured in an annual Cats of Parliament Hill calendar.

== Gallery ==
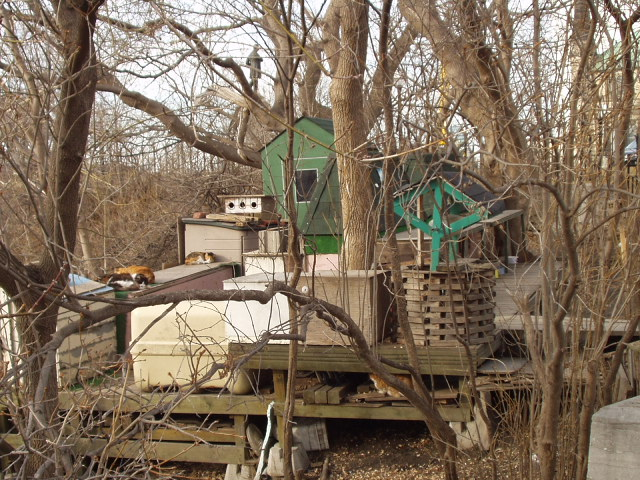
Cats napping outside their house

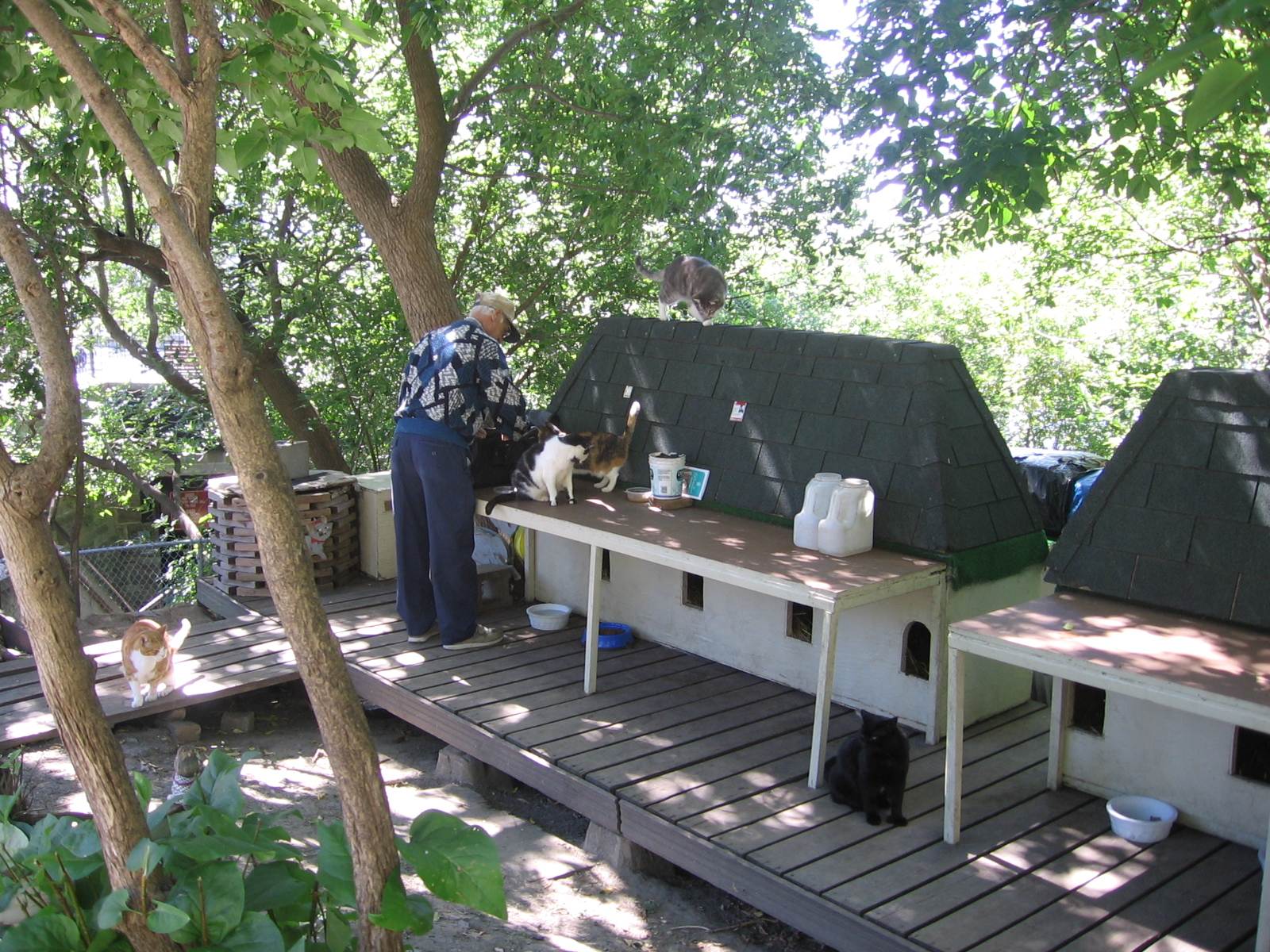
René Chartrand caring for the cats

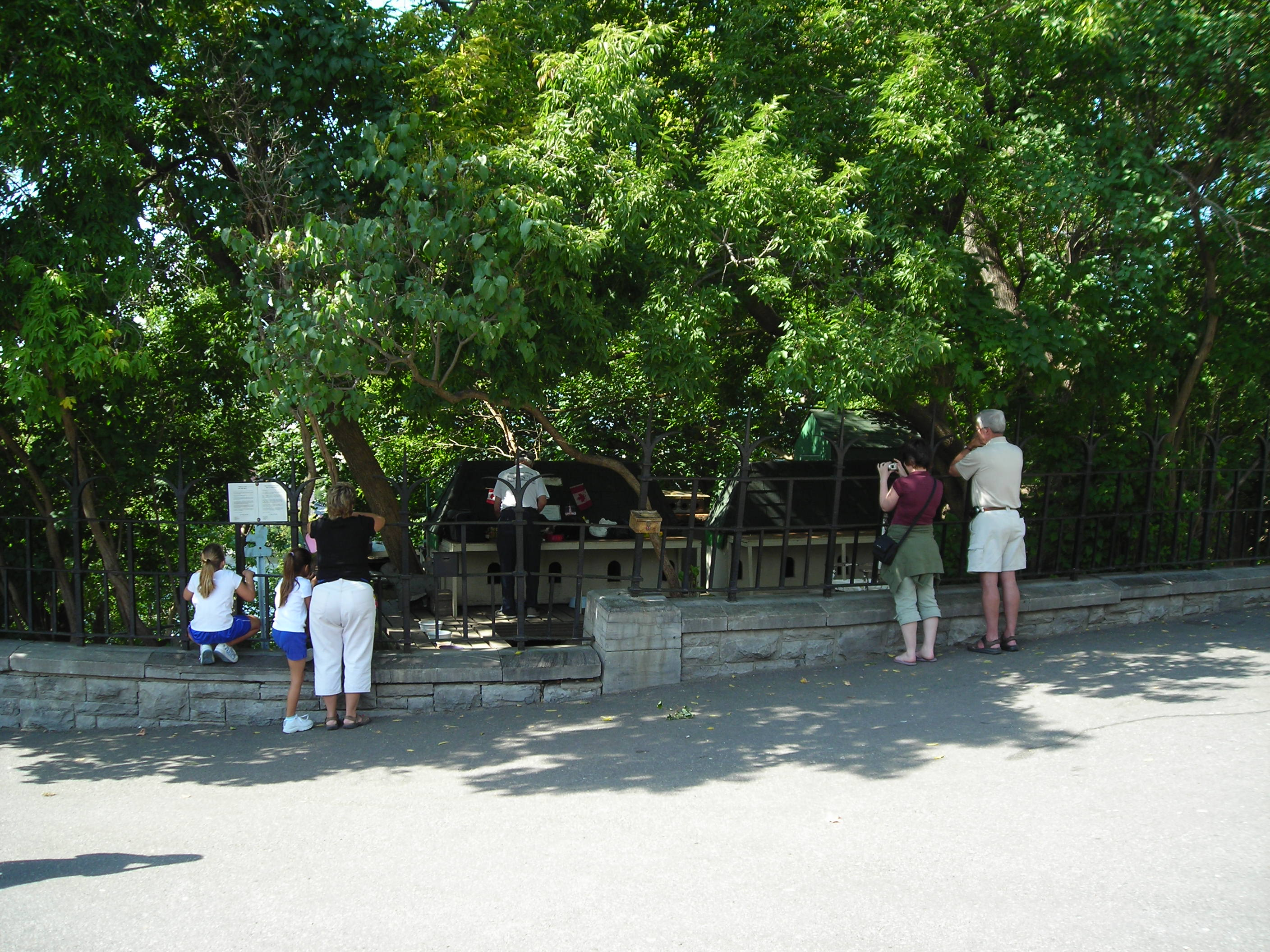
The sanctuary as seen from the grounds

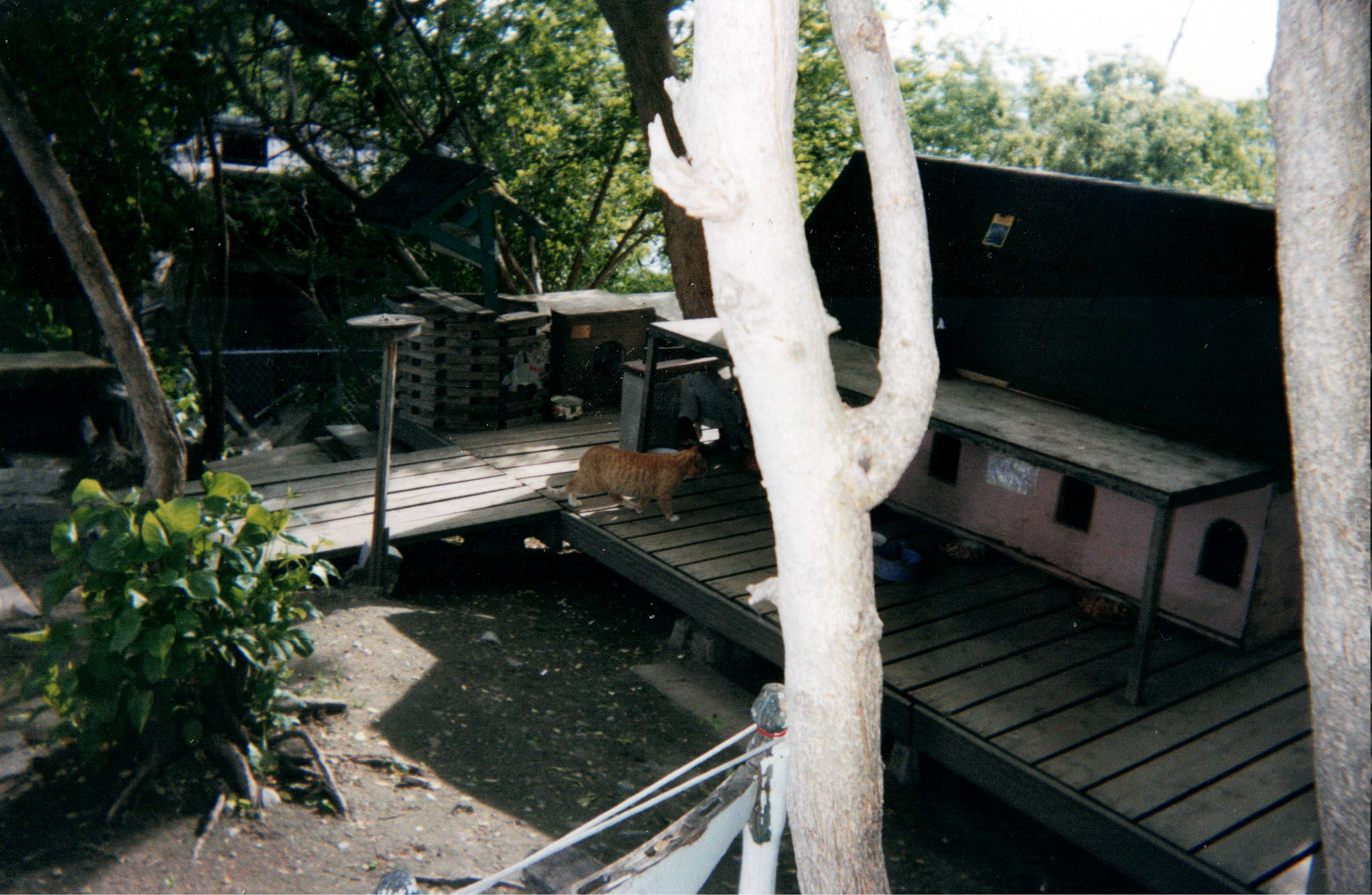
Cat Complex

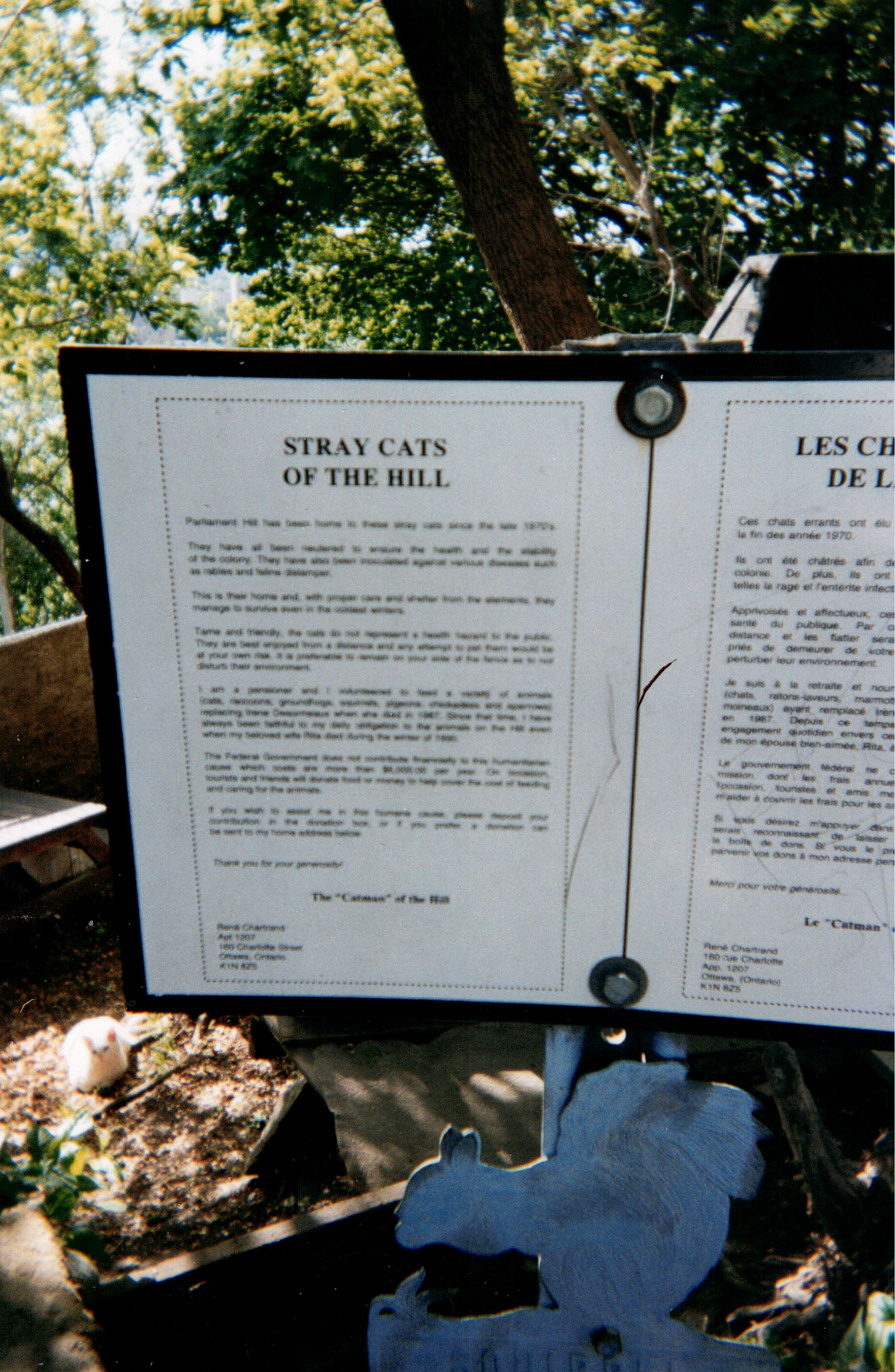
"Stray Cats Of The Hill" history plaque

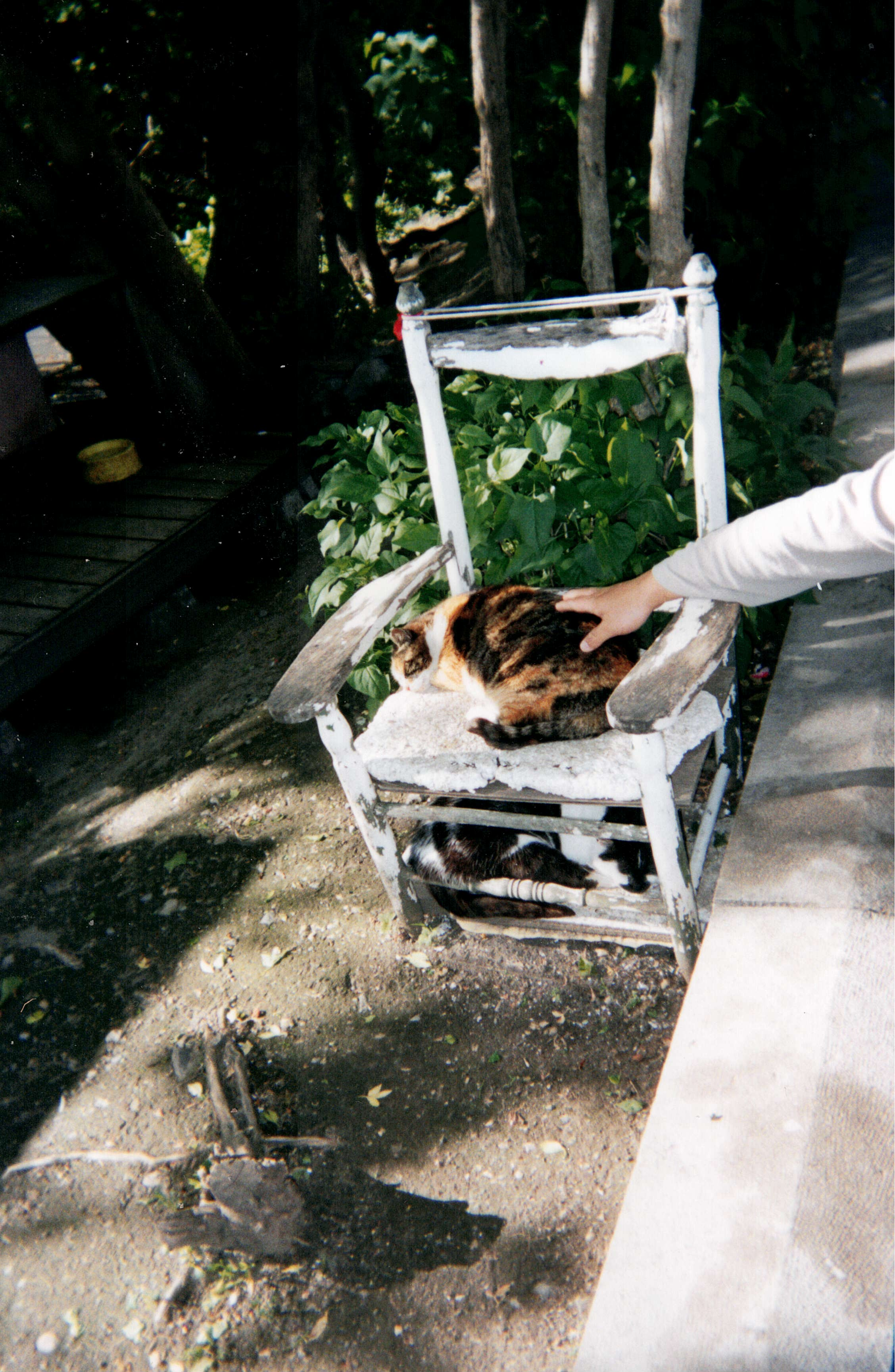
Cat Nap Sunning Chair

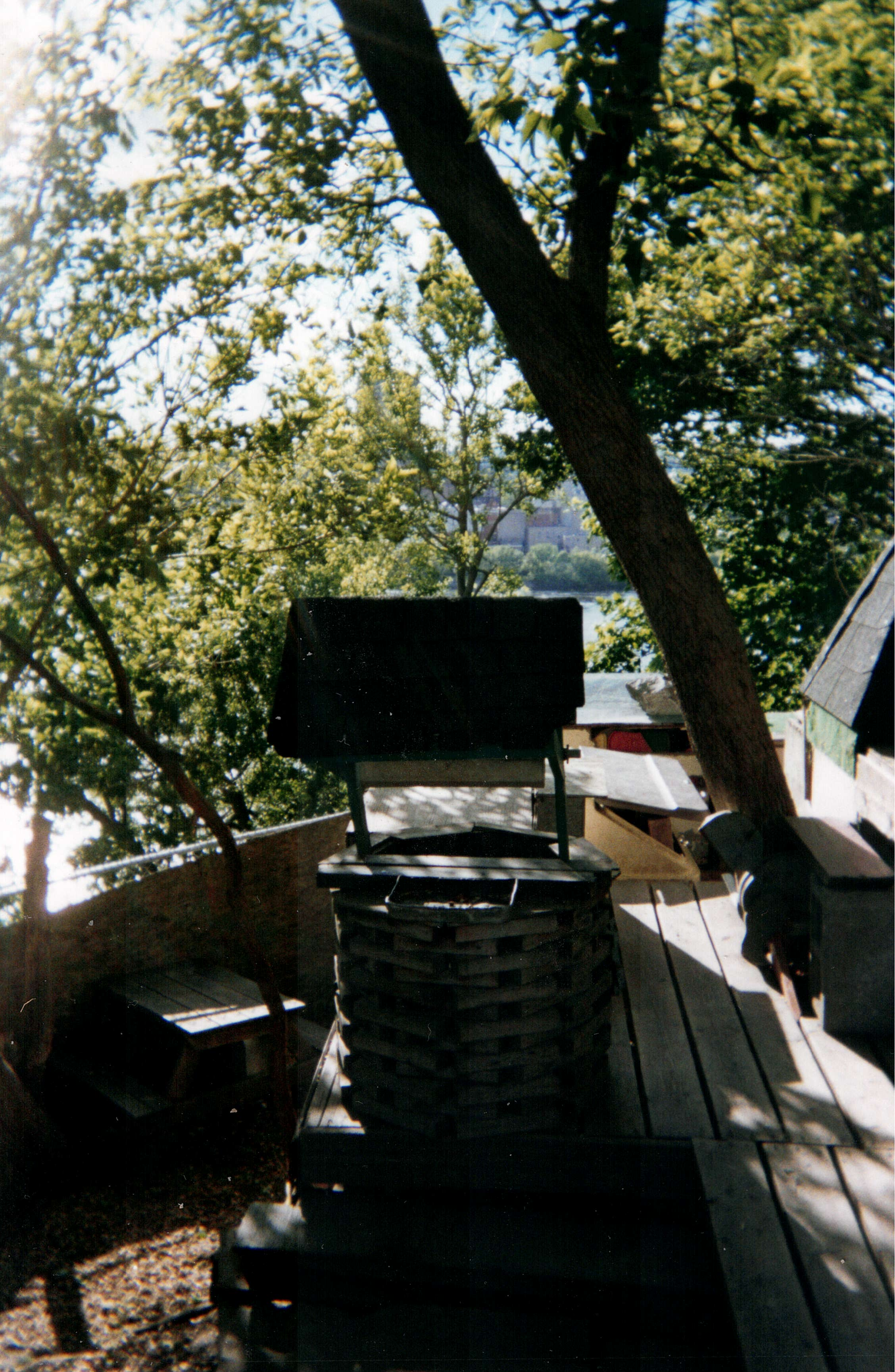
Enclosure

== See also ==
- Trap–neuter–return
- List of individual cats
