= Seiko Noda =

Japanese politician (born 1960)

- 野田 聖子
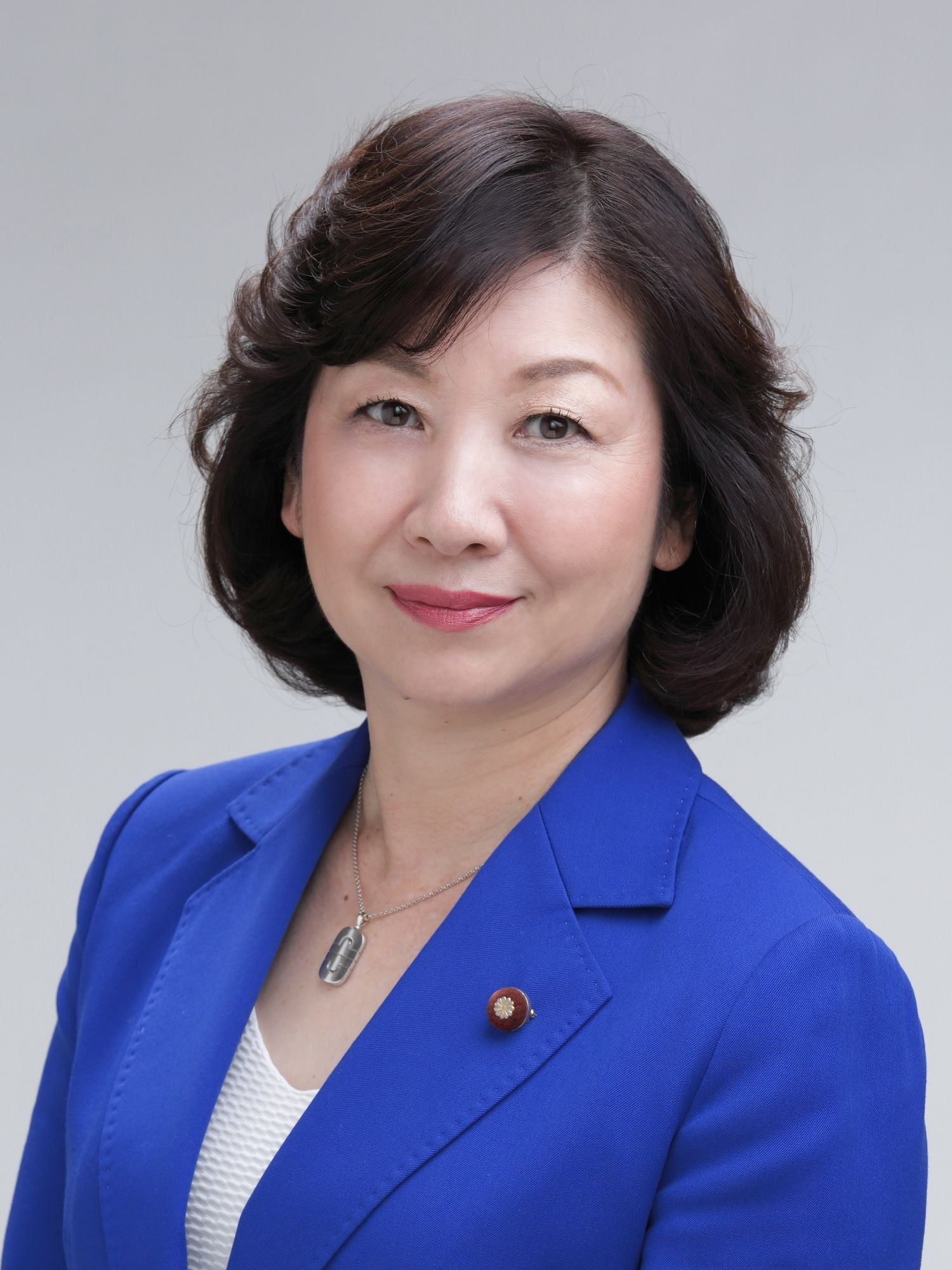
- Official portrait, 2017

Minister-in-charge of Measures against Declining Birthrate
- In office 4 October 2021 – 10 August 2022
- Prime Minister: Fumio Kishida
- Preceded by: Tetsushi Sakamoto
- Succeeded by: Masanobu Ogura

Minister for Internal Affairs and Communications
- In office 3 August 2017 – 2 October 2018
- Prime Minister: Shinzo Abe
- Preceded by: Sanae Takaichi
- Succeeded by: Masatoshi Ishida

Minister of Posts and Telecommunications
- In office 30 July 1998 – 5 October 1999
- Prime Minister: Keizō Obuchi
- Preceded by: Shozaburo Jimi
- Succeeded by: Eita Yashiro

Member of the House of Representatives
- Incumbent
- Assumed office 19 July 1993
- Preceded by: Akira Ōno
- Constituency: Former Gifu 1st (1993–1996); Gifu 1st (1996–2009); Tōkai PR (2009–2012); Gifu 1st (2012–present)

Member of the Gifu Prefectural Assembly
- In office April 1987 – 4 February 1990

Personal details
- Born: 3 September 1960 (age 66) Kitakyushu, Fukuoka, Japan
- Party: Liberal Democratic
- Spouses: Yōsuke Tsuruho (m. 2001; div. 2006) Fuminobu Noda (m. 2011)
- Children: 1
- Relatives: Uichi Noda (grandfather)
- Education: Sophia University
- Website: Official website

Seiko Noda (野田 聖子, Noda Seiko; born 3 September 1960) is a Japanese politician who served as Minister-in-charge of Measures against Declining Birthrate from October 2021 to August 2022. A member of the Liberal Democratic Party, she previously served as Minister for Internal Affairs and Communications from 2017 to 2018 under Shinzo Abe. Noda has been a member of the House of Representatives since 1993. She is a self-described conservative and was a candidate in the 2021 Liberal Democratic Party Leadership Election, however she was eliminated in a run-off, placing fourth in the first round.

== Early life ==
She was born in now Kitakyushu, Fukuoka. Her grandfather, Uichi Noda (1903–1997) was a Vice Minister of Finance, and was later elected as a member of the House of Representatives serving as Minister of Construction and Director General of the Economic Planning Agency. She was born Seiko Shima, but before entering politics she was officially adopted by her grandfather and took his name.

While enrolled at Futaba Academy (雙葉学園) Secondary School in the Tokyo suburb of Denenchofu. She moved to the United States and attended Jonesville High School in Jonesville, Michigan, for one year and graduated. In 1983, she graduated from the Sophia University (上智大学 jōchi daigaku) Foreign Language Department with a major in Comparative cultural studies, and took a job with the Imperial Hotel.

== Political career ==
In 1987, she campaigned for a Gifu Prefectural Assembly seat and won. With interest she watched the battle occurring at that time over the introduction of sales tax between the LDP and Socialist Party (the Socialist Party doubled their number of seats in the 1989 elections). She was impressed by the sudden popularity of the women's voice of the Socialist Party's Takako Doi, and gained a sense of urgency and self-awareness as a politician, thus deciding to take aim at national issues.

In the 39th lower house general elections of 1990, she was unable to gain endorsement from the LDP, and lost in the former Gifu 1st District. In the 40th lower house general elections of 1993, she ran again under the slogan "An LDP lady in the lower house" and won (at the time there were no female LDP lower house members). She was re-elected for the fifth time in the September 2005 snap election.

Following the 1993 elections, the Hosokawa Cabinet took leadership and the LDP had slipped to the minority, so she began her lower house career as a member of the opposition party. In the second Hashimoto Cabinet she was inaugurated as Vice Minister of Posts (November 7, 1996). In the Obuchi Cabinet formed on July 30, 1998, she was selected as Minister of Posts and Telecommunications, at 37 becoming the youngest post-war cabinet minister ever (a title formerly held by Kakuei Tanaka who was selected at age 39). After becoming minister, Prime Minister Obuchi called her "the future candidate for female Prime Minister". She also gained the attention of LDP Secretaries General Hiromu Nonaka and Makoto Koga. In 1999, she became LDP Diet Countermeasure Committee Vice-chair and House Steering Committee Program Director. As the program director position often goes to a promising young Diet member, and being the first woman to be selected, she became well known. In 2000, she served as LDP Policy Research Council Deputy Chairman, and First Vice-Secretary General.

In 2001, she married Yōsuke Tsuruho (鶴保庸介 b. 1967) of the Conservative Party, and instead of a reception held a "New Year's Get-Together" in January 2002 at the Imperial Hotel (their common-law marriage dissolved in 2007). In a turning point of her 10-year career as Diet member, she quit the Kōmura faction in December 2003. It is thought that this was to break free from the restraints of the faction and widen her potential support base. They separated in 2007.

She and her husband put their common-law marriage to practical use by leading the movement of the "joint male and female-planned society". She is a proponent of the right of women to keep their family name after marriage. This is despite her husband taking a position against the idea at the time the law enabling it was established. She puts first priority on children's issues, and is also actively involved in issues such as prohibition of child prostitution/pornography and support for the developmentally disabled (a member of the non-partisan "Association of Diet Members That Value Support for the Developmentally Disabled", which established the Support for Developmentally Disabled Act on November 24, 2001).

Her interests include reading and watching movies, karaoke, and using the computer. As a lover of Japanese sake, she serves as President of the "Sake-Loving Female Diet Members Club" (Secretary-General Yuko Obuchi), and an advisor to the Sake Manufacturers' Association. Her mail magazine is called "Catherine's Report," Catherine being the name of her French Bulldog. It is said that she got the dog during the difficult times of her infertility treatment on the advice of Diet member Seiko Hashimoto.

Noda was appointed as State Minister in charge of Consumer Affairs by Prime Minister Yasuo Fukuda on August 1, 2008. In the Cabinet of Prime Minister Taro Aso, appointed on September 24, 2008, Noda retained her post.

On 5 September 2021, Noda announced her intentions to run for the Liberal Democratic leadership in the 2021 election. On 4 October 2021, she was appointed to the new Cabinet by Prime Minister Fumio Kishida. She was given the portfolios of Minister for Promoting Dynamic Engagement of All Citizens, Minister of State for Measures for Declining Birthrate, Minister of State for Regional Revitalization, Minister of Loneliness, Minister in charge of Women's Empowerment and Minister of State for Gender Equality.

On 10 August 2022, Noda was dismissed from her ministerial position because of ties to the Unification Church. Her dismissal was part of a wider purge by the Kishida administration following the assassination of Shinzo Abe and increasing media scrutiny of LDP officials' close ties with the church. Former Bank of Japan official Masanobu Ogura was appointed as her replacement.

== Policies and accomplishments ==
Noda herself acknowledges that she is a mainstream conservative, in the sense that she believes in upholding the spirit of the constitution, and the core principles of the LDP. She also says that the fortunes of the nation depend on the valuing its people (she uses the term "talent"), and that developing and nurturing this talent is essential. Like many of her colleagues in the LDP, she is affiliated with the openly revisionist Nippon Kaigi.

=== Postal Privatization Bill ===
In 2005, she gained attention by voicing opposition to the postal privatization proposal pushed by Prime Minister Koizumi, an issue that dominated headlines that year.

Because of her opposition to the introduction of the Japan Post privatization bill on April 27, 2005, she is considered to be at the forefront of the anti-privatization group, but in response she explained "I'm just saying that the current Takenaka plan is useless" and that she is not opposed to the concept of privatization. She maintains that the bill would be a "direct hit on the people's way of life", pointing out that the United States, the model of deregulation, still keeps it under government control. She further criticizes the bill as a "mere wedge of confrontation".

She has consistently opposed and criticized the bill from the time of introduction. She took part in the Diet protest against privatization held on June 14, 2005, by the Nationwide Special Post Office Postmaster Women's Association (Chiyoe Takada, president), reaffirming her position on the issue. At the vote on the bill at the same Diet session, despite a call for party unity by the LDP, she indicated her opposition to the bill. She was criticized by the Postmaster's Association and others for her opposition, labeled a classic postal politician (receiving political contributions from loyal postal workers).

On July 5, 2005, at the regular session of the lower house she placed her vote of opposition to the bill, which passed by five votes but failed to pass the upper house vote. Her husband Tsuruho deferred to the judgment of his mentor Toshihiro Nikai and voted for the bill at the upper house vote, but announced his intention to leave Nikai's New Faction at a Diet news conference on August 19, 2005. As for the reason, he stated that "as a husband, naturally I must support my wife," and that he didn't want to cause a distraction to Party Affairs Director Nikai, who also serves as Secretariat Chief of the Party Election Task Force Headquarters. In addition, he added that, "everything I've voted against were those that hinted to reform opposition advocacy, and I have doubts about and the words and actions of the prime minister."

At the luncheon of the Foreign Correspondents' Club of Japan on July 6, she spoke about postal privatization and the declining birthrate problem, in English. When asked about the future of the postal privatization bill, she expressed her hope that it will be stopped, adding (in English), "I don't know [if there will be political confusion], but one thing I can tell is, Mr. Koizumi is no longer dynamite." The nearly 100 reporters and correspondents responded to the bold statement with a round of applause.

Upon learning that Noda and other LDP members who voted against the bill would not receive party endorsement in the September 2005 elections, on August 10, 2005, the LDP Gifu Prefecture branch association held a joint meeting, and revised association rules to allow support for a candidate not officially endorsed by the LDP. Kazuyoshi Kaneko, who supported the bill, voiced opposition to the decision, but another stated that "The association is united against the bill. It is the Diet representatives who answer to the voice of the region." Following the breakup of the lower house, at the first election strategy meeting on August 12 the association officially decided to support postal reform opponents Noda, Takao Fujii, and Keiji Furuya, and announced that association members who supported the candidates fielded by LDP headquarters would be disposed of.

Koizumi kept Noda and other privatization opponents off of the LDP ticket. He sent Yukari Sato as an "assassin" candidate against Noda. Running as an independent, Noda won the election in what was described in the press as a war between two "madonna" candidates. Noda later returned to the LDP.

Following the snap elections in which Koizumi won a mandate on privatization with the LDP gaining an overwhelming majority, Noda changed her stance. Noting that "...I understand (the LDP's success in the Sept. 11 House of Representatives election) was the voice of the people saying that privatization had to be sped up..." she voiced her intention to vote for the proposal.

=== Women retaining their name after marriage ===
As chair of the Ruling Party Female Diet Member Policy Proposal Committee's "Project Team on the System to Optionally Keep Separate Names After Marriage", on November 5, 2001, after receiving the agreement of Hiromu Nonaka, Kōichi Katoo, Yūko Obuchi and 45 others (including Noda), the proposal for the System to Optionally Keep Separate Names After Marriage was submitted. An LDP "Committee to Realize the Right To Keep Separate Names in Exceptional Cases" was formed and gained great attention. This was because Sadanori Yamanaka, who stood in opposition with the comment "As long as I live I will never "realize" this (law)", was made chief advisor. A proposal was submitted by the committee on July 24, 2002. On February 22, 2005, she took part in a non-partisan Diet member "Emergency Diet Meeting on the Right To Keep Separate Names". Out of concern that it might not gain unanimous agreement of all party members as generally required, she said that she was "tempted to pushing the bill as a non-partisan proposal".

=== Declining birthrate issue ===
Having taken eight external fertilization treatments in three years and undergone infertility treatment while a Diet member, Seiko turned her attention to the declining birthrate issue. In the fall of 2002 she expressed her intention to focus on the issue. In regards to the plan of the Koizumi administration, she criticized it as being "10 points out of a possible 100". Coming from friction with her husband over external fertilization treatments, the difficulties of commuting to the hospital as a Diet member, and having experienced the pain of miscarriage, Seiko published "I want to give birth" in December 2004 through Shinchōsha after even considering publishing out of her own pocket. The following year in May 2005 she published "Who is taking away the future - taking on the declining birthrate" through Kodansha. Seiko disputed comments within the party like "women don't have babies because they have chosen careers instead" with data on high birthrates in places where women often work, such as western nations. Taking on the issues of the declining birthrate, the aging of Japan, and population decrease, she proposed countermeasures to increase the population while criticizing the traditional values of fellow party members. In 2010 Noda was able to conceive a child through vitro fertilization at the age of 50 using an egg donor from the United States. Noda had tried adopting but hit a wall after being told that being 50, she had to consider the future of the child. She has said that an egg donor was the last resort for her.

== Yakuza allegations ==
In 2011 Noda married Kimura Fuminobu after the two met at a Korean restaurant in Kyoto. In September 2017 Shūkan Bunshun and Shukan Shincho alleged that Noda's husband was a former Yakuza member with the Aizukotetsu-kai, citing Metropolitan police records. In August 2018 Shūkan Bunshun and Asahi Shimbun reported that Noda was pressured by her husband to arrange a meeting between a private cryptocurrency company and the Financial Services Agency. Noda denied the allegations and sued for defamation seeking a total of 22,000,000 Yen (US$162,000) in damages. The case was elevated to the Supreme Court of Japan, where Shūkan Bunshun's reporting was judged to be factually correct and the case was dismissed. The ruling stated that there were "reasonable grounds" to believe that the arranged meeting took place.

== Books written ==
=== Self-authored ===
- Dec 1987 『アイアム聖イング』 (I am Seeing) 海越出版社、ISBN 4-906203-52-3
- Jun 1994 『改革という美名の下で』 (Under the pretext of reform), 海越出版社、ISBN 4-87697-188-9
- Feb 1996 『国民のみなさまにお伝えしたいこと ホンネで語る政治学』 (Things I want to get across to the people - politics spoken with sincerity), PHP研究所、ISBN 4-569-55017-7
- Dec 2004 『私は、産みたい』 (I want to give birth) 新潮社、ISBN 4-10-472901-9
- May 2005 『だれが未来を奪うのか 少子化と闘う』 (Who is taking away our future - fighting the declining birthrate), 講談社、ISBN 4-06-212833-0

=== Co-authored ===
- Oct 2001 『ポストITは日本が勝つ！ トップランナー7人の提言』 (Japan will win the post-IT era! - proposals of seven leading figures), （杉山知之編）、アスキー、ISBN 4-7561-3918-3
- Mar 2005 『よくわかる改正児童買春・児童ポルノ禁止法』 (Easy-to-understand guide to the revised child prostitution/pornography law), （森山眞弓と共編）ぎょうせい、ISBN 4-324-07587-5

== Related links ==
- Politics of Japan
- Cabinet of Japan

Political offices
Preceded by Shozaburo Jimi	Minister of Posts and Telecommunications; 1998–1999	Succeeded by Eita Yashiro
Preceded by Fumio Kishida	Minister of State for Science and Technology; 2008–2009	Succeeded by Naoto Kan
Preceded by Shinya Izumi	Minister of State for Food Safety; 2008–2009	Succeeded by Mizuho Fukushima
New title	Minister of State for Consumer Affairs; 2009	Succeeded by Mizuho Fukushima
Preceded by Sanae Takaichi	Minister for Internal Affairs and Communications; 2017–2018	Succeeded by Masatoshi Ishida
Preceded by Masaji Matsuyama	Minister of State for Gender Equality; 2017–2018	Succeeded by Satsuki Katayama
Preceded by Tamayo Marukawa	Minister of State for Gender Equality; 2021–2022	Succeeded by Masanobu Ogura
Preceded by Tetsushi Sakamoto	Minister of State for Measures against Declining Birthrate; 2021–2022	Succeeded by Masanobu Ogura
Preceded by Tetsushi Sakamoto	Minister of State for Regional Revitalisation; 2021–2022	Succeeded by Naoki Okada
Party political offices
Preceded by Hiroyuki Hosoda	Chairman of the General Council, Liberal Democratic Party; 2012–2014	Succeeded by Toshihiro Nikai
Preceded by Tomomi Inada	Executive Acting Secretary General, Liberal Democratic Party; 2020-2021	Succeeded by Hiroshi Kajiyama
