= Teacup dog =

Smaller than average dog

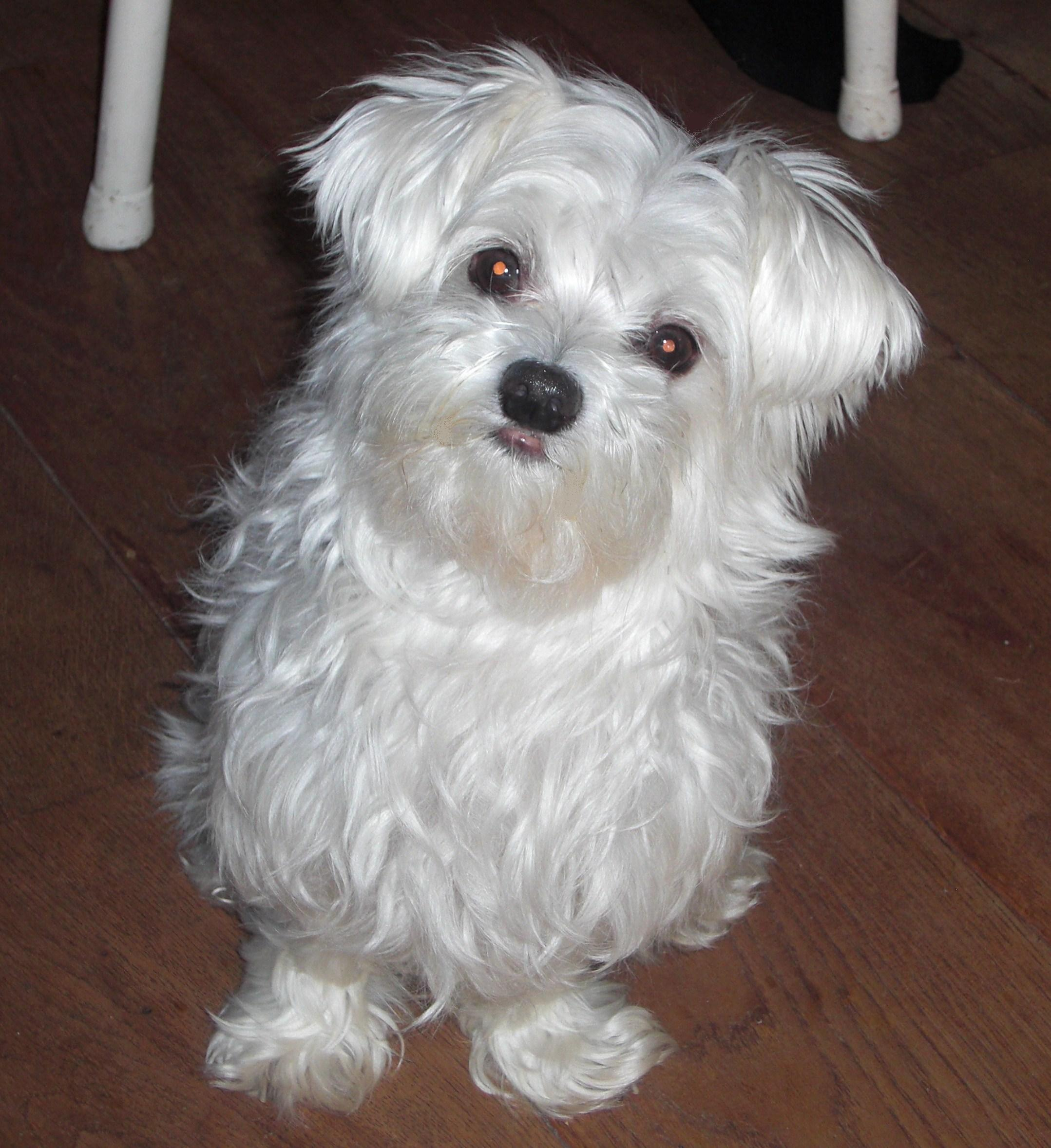
A Maltese dog, one of many breeds with a "teacup" variety

A teacup dog, also called a pocket dog, tiny dog, and micro dog, is a dog that is smaller than a typical dog of that breed. Many teacup dogs come from already small breeds. The term comes from the fact that the dogs are so small that they can, in theory, fit in a teacup. As "teacup" is a descriptor and not a breed, the Royal Kennel Club and American Kennel Club do not recognize any teacup breeds or note teacup dogs on their registers.

Many breeders discourage the breeding of teacup dogs for health reasons. Teacups are frequently produced by breeding runts together, or by inbreeding, leading to a variety of health problems.

== Description ==
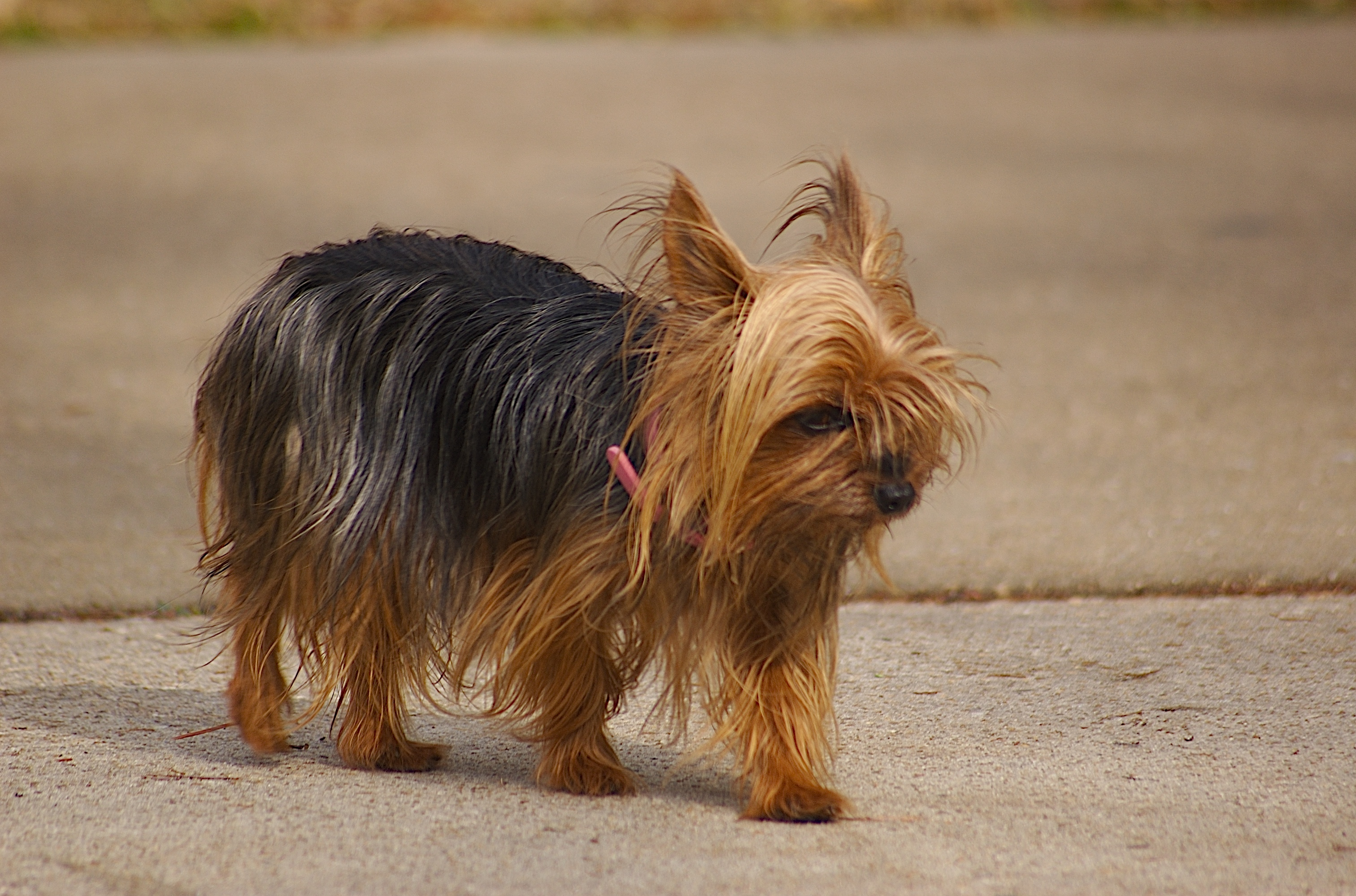
Teacup Yorkshire Terrier

"Teacup" is largely a marketing term used to describe a dog smaller than the standard for its breed. As such, no exact size is specified, though they often weigh under 5 lb (2.3 kg). Teacup Yorkshire terriers, for example, weight 2 to 3 lb (0.91 to 1.36 kg), in constrast to the standard 7 lb (3.2 kg) for the breed. Teacups are produced by breeding together two runts.

Some breeds may have variations called "teacup". There exist "teacup" versions of Chihuahuas, Yorkshire terriers, poodles, and Maltese. Most teacup dogs are members of already very small breeds.

No "teacup" varieties are recognized by the Royal Kennel Club or the American Kennel Club, and the breeding of such dogs is discouraged.

== Health concerns ==
A brachycephalic dog skull. Though not all teacup dogs are brachycephalic, many are, and in general they are bred for large skulls.

Multiple health issues are associated with runts and teacup dogs. They may suffer from hypoglycaemia (low blood sugar); portosystemic shunts; periodontitis and gingivitis (due to the small jaw leading to problems with tooth growth); tracheal collapse; degenerative mitral valve disease; and hypothermia. Diseases and conditions that regular-sized dogs usually survive can prove fatal in teacup breeds, due to the teacups being smaller and weaker.

Teacups also have fragile bones, which can be accidentally broken while playing. Luxating patella and Legg-Calvé-Perthes disease are two large concerns for teacups due to this. It is estimated that 30% of the teacups in South Korea have some kind of leg disability.

Newborn Yorkshire terriers. Teacup puppies often have to be delivered via Caesarian section.

Teacup dogs are bred to retain juvenile characteristics in adulthood. The large size of the skull can cause hydrocephaly and moleras. While the latter condition is most associated with Chihuahuas, it often occurs in teacup Yorkshire terriers as well. The condition arises because the growth of cranial bone often stops early in teacup dogs. Many teacup dogs belong to brachycephalic breeds, such as pugs and French bulldogs, and the health issues associated with those breeds may be aggravated by the teacup size. Teacup puppies often get stuck in the mother dog's birth canal due to both their large heads and the mother's weakness, necessitating Caesarian sections, though even with such intervention the mother may still die.

Their small size can lead to problems with the dosage of certain medications such as flea treatment as most flea treatments and other anti-parasite medications are only labeled as suitable for use in dogs over 5 lbs (2 kg). Vets must use very small needles and pills, both supplies that can be scarce, when treating teacup dogs.

== Ethical concerns ==
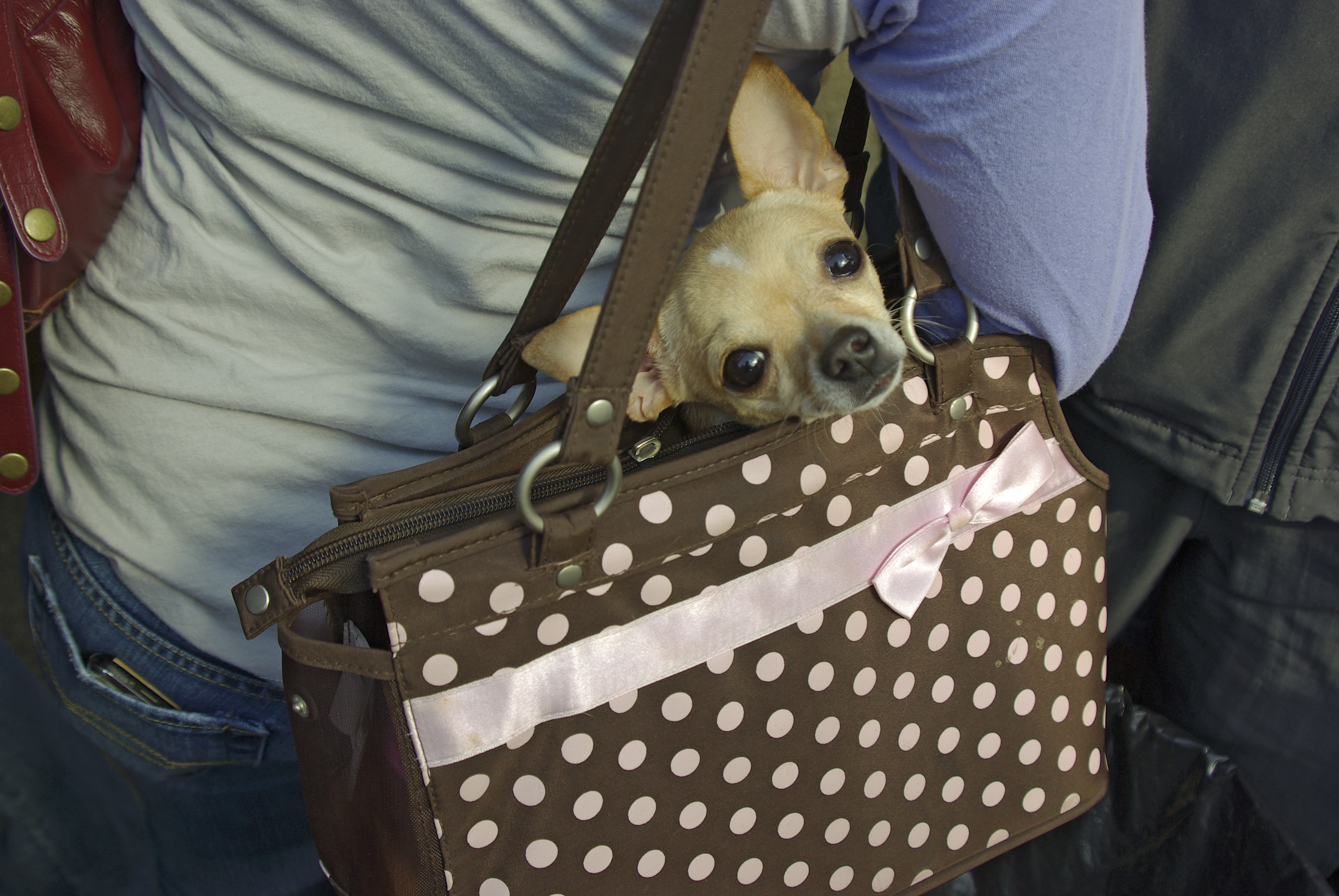
A chihuahua in a purse. Teacup dogs are small enough to be carried in purses, and their name comes from the alleged ability to fit in a teacup.

The health concerns regarding teacup dogs are so massive that organizations like the British Veterinary Association have taken action to discourage potential owners from buying such dogs. Some veterinarians consider the use of "teacup" in puppy advertisements to be a "red flag" that a breeder is untrustworthy. The Royal Society for the Prevention of Cruelty to Animals has criticized the practice, saying that the dogs are bred for appearance first and health second.

In addition to the associated health concerns, ethical concerns exist over the costs of these dogs. Typically, underweight dogs are usually sold for cheaper prices, or even for free on the condition that they be neutered. Teacups, in contrast, are not only bred to be underweight, but are often sold at higher prices due to their size, with their breeders claiming that the small size makes them more valuable. Teacup Pomeranians, for example, can sell for as much as $25,000 USD. However, prices can vary by region; in India, for example, prices for teacup dogs start at $250.

A chihuahua in a hat. Teacup dogs are sometimes dressed up by their owners.

Concern also exists over the conditions teacup dogs are kept in. Many are allegedly sourced from South Korean puppy mills, and puppies that exceed teacup size before they are sold may be euthanized by the breeder. At one such mill, raided by Gyeonggi police in 2023, as many as 300 dogs were crammed into a single room, and an alleged 50 dogs died each month. While teacups usually come from breeding two runts together, some breeders may ensure small stature by forcing the mother into premature delivery or by starving puppies.

Another concern is that teacup dogs are viewed as living fashion accessories rather than animals. Some owners may dress up their dogs or spray them with perfume in an attempt to "cutify" them further, which can be disastrous for the animal's well-being. This view may also lead to the owner properly exercising or socializing the dog. Concerns have been raised over the abandonment of teacup dogs after they go out of style. Teacup dogs are often carried in purses, but, as author Madeline Bernstein writes:

If a six-ounce dog pees and poops its weight in a $1,500 Louis Vuitton purse, the dog may transform from a best friend to a pest, from the best accessory to a defective one, and then he's shown the door.

== Uses ==
A 3-month-old Pomeranian puppy. The appeal of teacup dogs comes from their lifelong resemblance to puppies.

The main appeal of teacup dogs comes from their cute appearance. Teacup dogs resemble puppies even in adulthood. This is due to both their small stature, and their often large skulls and eyes, which resemble human babies and make the dogs look unthreatening. Unlike a human baby, a teacup dog remains "cute" for several years, and requires less work to take care of; therefore some owners may view them as substitutes for actual children. Teacup dogs are well suited to life in apartments, as they are small and produce less waste than other dogs.

The Teacup Dogs Agility Association is a dog agility organization open to dogs less than 20 inches tall. There is no specification for breeds. The obstacles are scaled down in size compared to typical agility competitions, so as to be safer for teacup dogs. Small dogs may not do as well in standard agility competitions due to their paws being too small for judges to see.

== Popularity ==
Teacup dogs are popular pets in the United States, South Korea, and the United Kingdom. In the English-speaking world, interest in small dogs arose in the 2000s, popularized by celebrities like Britney Spears, Jessica Simpson, and Paris Hilton, the latter of whom owned a chihuahua described as "Hilton's best friend and definitely her best accessory." In the 2020s, as the trend faded in the west, teacup dogs became fashionable in South Korea due to endorsements from K-pop stars such as S.Coups and Jennie. The pet culture of nearby Japan is also cited as a reason for the South Korean rise in interest.

During the COVID-19 Pandemic in 2020, Google searches related to the sale of teacup dogs (such as "teacup dog prices") increased, linked to the larger trend of people acquiring new pets during the quarantine.

== See also ==
- Designer dog
- Dwarf cat
- Mexican lap dog, the smallest dog breed to ever exist
- Miniature pig
- Neoteny
- Toy dog
