= Molera =

Soft spot in the skull of Chihuahuas

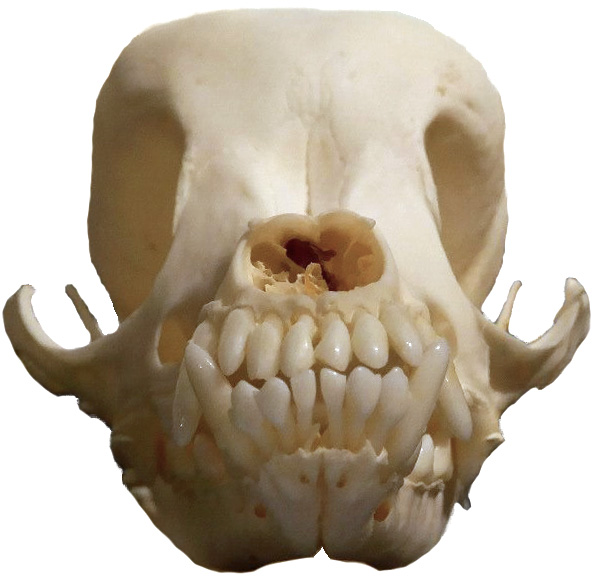
Chihuahua skull. Chihuahuas are particularly prone to moleras.

A molera (also known as a fontanel, from the Spanish mollera) is a "soft spot" on the top of a small dog's skull. It is the equivalent to the bregmatic or anterior fontanelle in human babies, but unlike most mammals, a molera persists into maturity. Historically it has been very common amongst Chihuahuas, and is also seen in other small dog breeds, such as the Yorkshire terrier. Moleras are linked to several health problems, such as hydrocephalus and ventriculomegaly, Chiari-like malformation and syringomyelia.

== Description ==
Fontanelles are fibrous, membrane-covered gaps that lie between the skull bones and at the intersection of the cranial sutures. The cranial sutures are the junctions between cranial (or skull) bones. The fontanelles serve as the major sites of bone expansion during post-natal skull growth which accommodates the enlarging brain. The Chihuahua likely has a molera because of neuroparenchymal disproportion (i.e. a proportionally big brain for the skull). This is likely because there is premature closure of the skull base cranial sutures (brachycephaly due to craniosynostosis). To accommodate the developing brain there is increased growth of the skull bone in a parallel plane giving the dog a characterised domed or "apple-headed" appearance.

== Breed prevalence ==
The interior fontanelle of a human infant. Most mammals lack fontanelles in adulthood. Dogs with moleras are exceptions to this rule.

Most toy dogs are born with moleras that close by adulthood. Breeds known to have moleras in adulthood include Chihuahuas, Maltese, Yorkshire terriers, Lhasa Apsos, pugs, Pekingese, English bulldogs, and miniature dachsunds. Chihuahua are especially notable, because their molera was once used as a mark of purity when judging the breed. The Chihuahua breed standards for both the American Kennel Club and Canadian Kennel Club both allow moleras, so long as the skull is "apple domed". The condition is also common in teacup dogs, toy dogs that are bred for even smaller size, as their craniums often stop growing before the hole can close.

Though little is known about the prevalence of moleras in wild canines, there is one known instance of a raccoon dog with severe hydrocephalus, which was discovered to have an open fontanelle.

== Effect on health ==
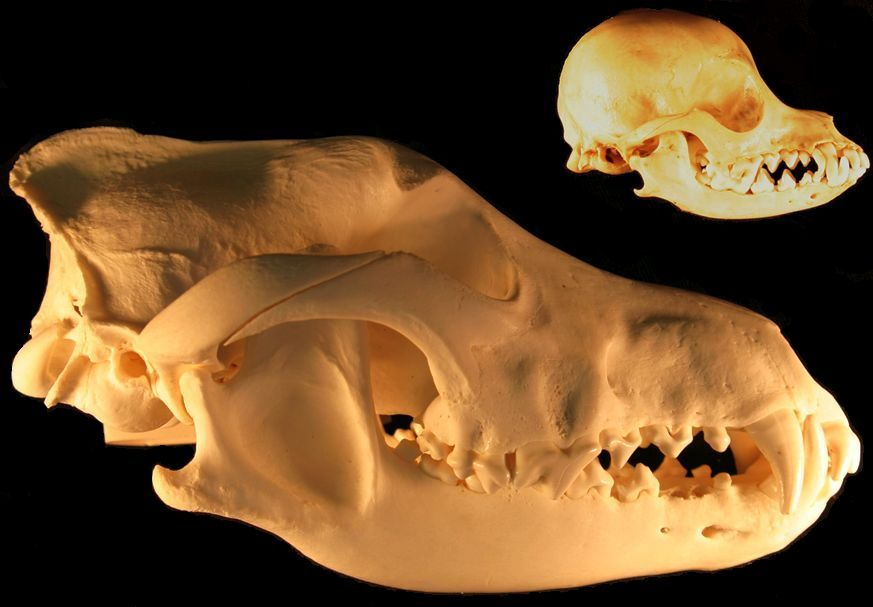
The skull of a grey wolf (bottom) versus the skull of a Chihuahua (top). The wolf is the ancestor of all domestic dogs, including Chihuahuas.

A molera does not necessarily cause health issues on its own, as the brain can be protected by its surrounding membranes. However, moleras are considered a "prerequisite" to syringomyelia (fluid filled cavities in the spinal cord), and is also linked to ventriculomegaly (i.e. enlargement of the lateral ventricles) and craniocervical junction abnormalities.

Moleras are comorbid with brachycephaly. Moleras appear in dome-shaped craniums, and are wider in extreme cases of brachycephaly. In Chihuahuas, these two conditions are especially linked to low body weight.

=== Breed club statements ===
Breed clubs have made statements regarding the health effects of moleras. The Chihuahua Club of America says that there is no link between moleras and hydrocephalus, citing several veterinarians and claiming that a well cared for Chihuahua will not have any of the associated health problems. The American Maltese Association concedes that a molera can occur with hydrocephaluls, but that it is not guaranteed, and that the biggest threat to a dog with an open molera is accidental injury.
