= Japanese Chin =

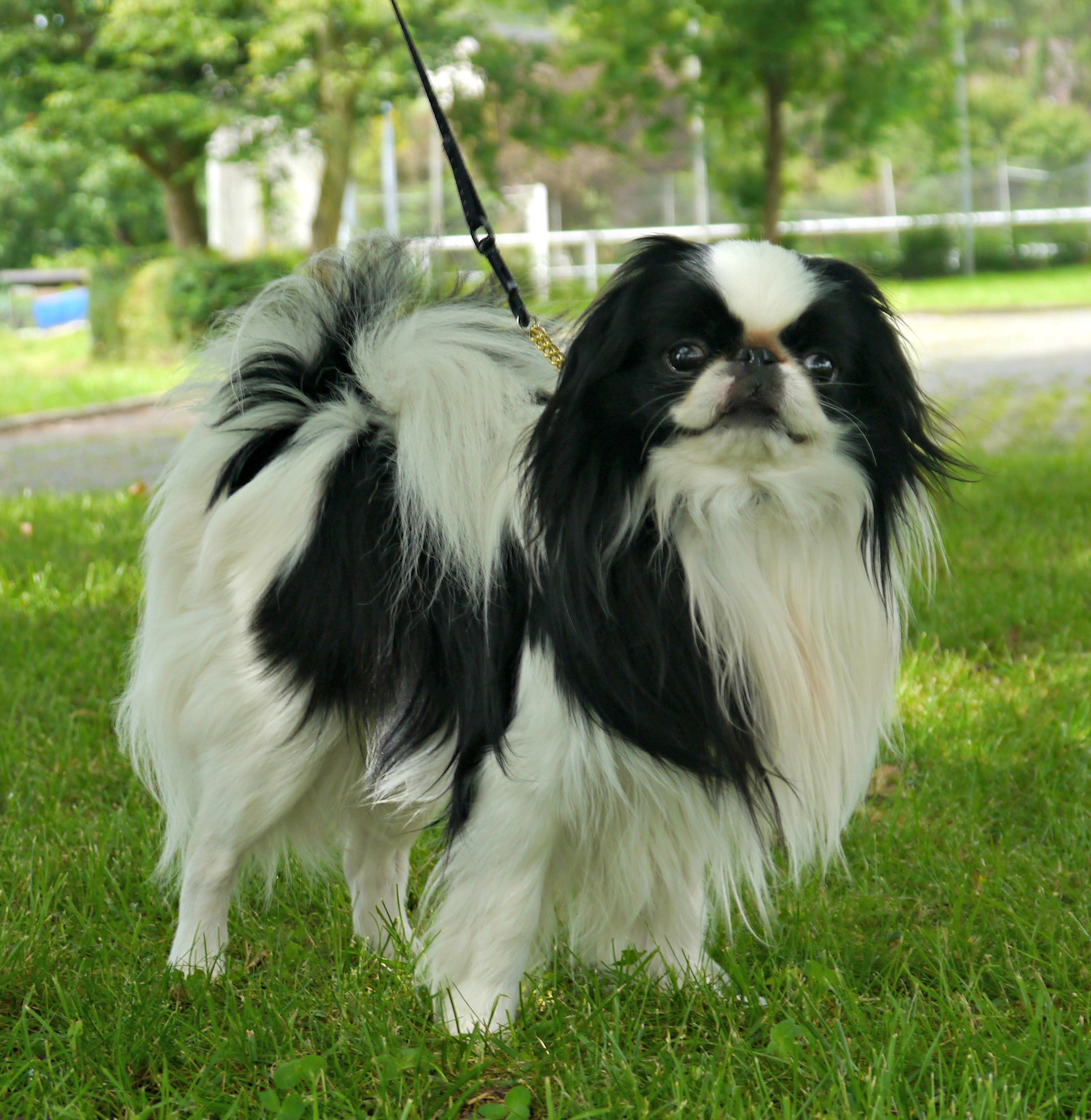
- An adult male Japanese Chin. A fully mature Chin's coat is long and full.
- Other names: Japanese Spaniel
- Common nicknames: Chin
- Origin: Japan
Kennel club standards
- Japan Kennel Club: standard
- Fédération Cynologique Internationale: standard

The Japanese Chin (Japanese: 狆, chin), also known as the Japanese Spaniel, is a toy dog breed from Japan, being both a lap dog and a companion dog, with a distinctive heritage.

== History ==
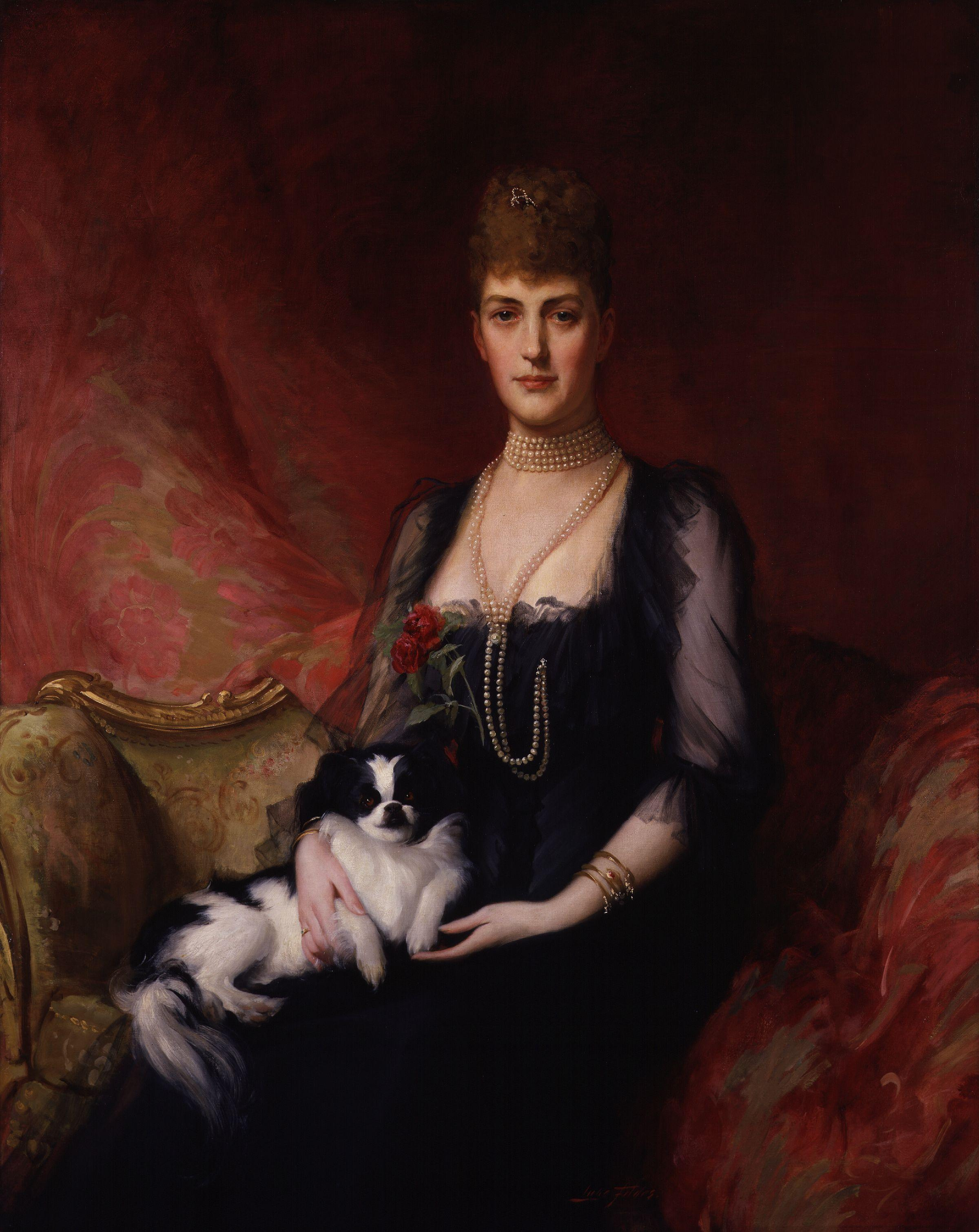
Alexandra of Denmark with her Japanese Chin, named Punch, original painted 1893.

While most believe that the source breed for the Japanese Chin originated in China, the route by which the Chin arrived in Japan is a widely debated topic. One story claims that the dogs were given to the Japanese royalty in AD 732 as gifts brought by Kim Jangson (金長孫), an envoy from the kingdom of Silla on the Korean peninsula. Others maintain that they were given as gifts to the Empress of Japan as early as the middle of the sixth century or by the seventh century. Still others claim that the Chin first arrived in Japan around the year AD 1000.

In 1613, the Japanese Chin was brought to England. In 1853 one was acquired by American naval officer, Matthew Calbraith Perry. Since 1868 they have been lap dogs to ladies of the upper class and today are companion dogs.

== Appearance ==
The Japanese Chin stand about approximately 25 cm (10 in) in height at the withers for male dogs, with bitches being slightly taller. The Fédération Cynologique Internationale gives no weight requirement for the Chin. Its distinctive expression is characterized by a large rounded broad head, large wide-set dark eyes, a very short broad muzzle, ear feathering, and evenly patterned facial markings.

=== Coat and color ===
Japanese Chin are very cat-like in both appearance and traits. Most dogs have two types of hair in their coat: an under and over coat. However, the Japanese Chin only has an over coat. An adult coat can take up to two years to completely grow in and can be either black and white, red and white (including all shades of sable, lemon, or orange), or tricolour (black and white with reddish tan points) As of 11 November 2011, the colors not listed in the breed standard are grounds for disqualification in competitions.

The dogs have a dot or a line on their forehead, which is believed in Japanese history to be the touch of Buddha.

== Temperament ==
Japanese Chins enjoy walks and are moderately active dogs, but are also suitable for living in smaller spaces, such as flats. They are also described as stubborn, and are recommended to not be let off leash outdoors.

Japanese Chins are bred for royalty, and thus is a breed that is reported as charming, fun, and entertaining for their owners. The breed is temperamental.

Japanese Chins can also present symptoms of separation anxiety. However, they can be trained to not be anxious when left alone through crate training.

== Health ==
A 2024 UK study found a life expectancy of 12.5 years for the breed compared to an average of 12.7 for purebreeds and 12 for crossbreeds.

Common health issues in the Japanese Chin include luxating patellas (slipping kneecaps), cataracts, and early-onset heart murmurs.

== See also ==
- List of dog breeds
- Companion Group
- Toy Group
