= Hirofumi Hirano =

Japanese politician

- 平野 博文
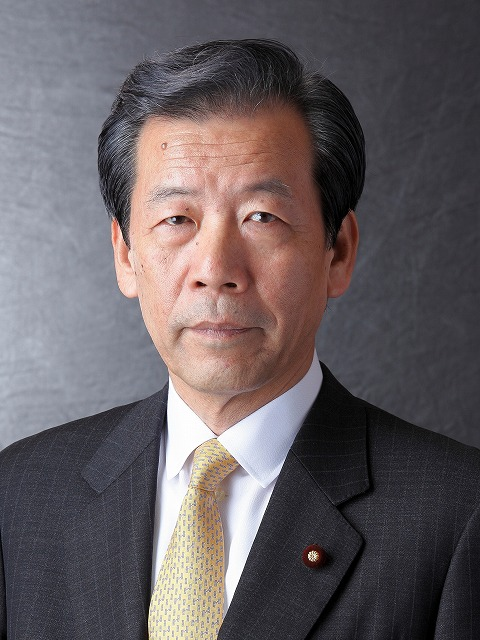
- Official portrait, 2012

Chief Cabinet Secretary
- In office 16 September 2009 – 8 June 2010
- Prime Minister: Yukio Hatoyama
- Preceded by: Takeo Kawamura
- Succeeded by: Yoshito Sengoku

Minister of Education, Culture, Sports, Science and Technology
- In office 13 January 2012 – 1 October 2012
- Prime Minister: Yoshihiko Noda
- Preceded by: Masaharu Nakagawa
- Succeeded by: Makiko Tanaka

Member of the House of Representatives
- In office 19 December 2014 – 14 October 2021
- Preceded by: Multi-member district
- Succeeded by: Hiroshi Nakatsuka
- Constituency: Kinki PR (2014–2017); Osaka 11th (2017–2021)
- In office 21 October 1996 – 16 November 2012
- Preceded by: Constituency established
- Succeeded by: Nobuhisa Ito
- Constituency: Osaka 11th

Personal details
- Born: 19 March 1949 (age 77) Katsuragi, Wakayama, Japan
- Party: CDP (since 2020)
- Other political affiliations: Independent (1996–1998); DPJ (1998–2016); DP (2016–2018); DPP (2018–2020)
- Education: Chuo University

Hirofumi Hirano (平野 博文, Hirano Hirofumi; born 19 March 1949) is a Japanese politician of the Constitutional Democratic Party of Japan and a former member of the House of Representatives in the Diet (national legislature). He is a native of Katsuragi, Wakayama and he started working for Panasonic Corporation in 1971 after graduating from Chuo University. He was elected to the House of Representatives for the first time in 1996 as an independent. He was the Chief Cabinet Secretary in the Yukio Hatoyama administration. He represented the 11th District of Osaka Prefecture from 1996 until 2012, and again from 2014 to 2021.

Political offices
Preceded by Takeo Kawamura	Chief Cabinet Secretary of Japan; 2009–2010	Succeeded by Yoshito Sengoku
Preceded by Mizuho Fukushima	Minister of State for Consumer Affairs and Food Safety (acting); 2010	Succeeded by Satoshi Arai
Preceded by Mizuho Fukushima	Minister of State for Social Affairs and Gender Equality (acting); 2010	Succeeded by Kōichirō Genba
House of Representatives (Japan)
New constituency	Representative for Osaka's 11th district 1996–2021	Succeeded by Hiroshi Nakatsuka
