= Hiroshi Nakatsuka =

Japanese politician

- 中司 宏
- Official portrait, 2026

Minister of State for Regulatory Reform
- Incumbent
- Assumed office 17 September 2026
- Prime Minister: Sanae Takaichi
- Preceded by: Minoru Kiuchi

Secretary-General of the Japan Innovation Party
- In office 12 August 2025 – 16 September 2026
- Leader: Hirofumi Yoshimura
- Preceded by: Ryohei Iwatani
- Succeeded by: Shibata Takumi

Member of the House of Representatives
- Incumbent
- Assumed office 1 November 2021
- Preceded by: Hirofumi Hirano
- Constituency: Osaka 11th

Member of the Osaka Prefectural Assembly
- In office April 2015 – 5 October 2021
- Constituency: Hirakata City
- In office April 1987 – July 1993
- Constituency: Hirakata City

Mayor of Hirakata
- In office April 1995 – September 2007
- Preceded by: Kazuo Ōshio
- Succeeded by: Osamu Takeuchi

Personal details
- Born: 11 March 1956 (age 70) Hirakata, Osaka, Japan
- Party: Ishin (since 2020); One Osaka (since 2015)
- Other political affiliations: LDP (until 1995); Independent (1995–2015)
- Education: Waseda University
- Website: Hiroshi Nakatsuka website

Hiroshi Nakatsuka (中司 宏, Nakatsuka Hiroshi; born 11 March 1956) is a Japanese politician of the Japan Innovation Party, who serves as the Minister of State for Regulatory Reform since September 2026. He has also served a member of the House of Representatives since 2021. He is the first member of his party to enter the cabinet of the government.

== Early years ==
Born on 1 March 1956, Nakatsuka was born in Hirakata, Osaka Prefecture. He began his career at Sankei Shimbun following his graduation from Waseda University's First School of Humanities.

== Political career ==
In 1987, Nakatsuka ran for the Osaka Prefectural Assembly and was elected. As a member of the Osaka Prefectural Assembly, he belonged to LDP.

In 1993, Nakatsuka resigned as a member of the Osaka Prefectural Assembly. He run as a LDP candidate in the 1993 general election but lost.

=== Mayor of Hirakata ===
In 1995, Nakatsuka ran for mayor of Hirakata and was elected to mayor for the first time.

In 2007, Nakatsuka resigned as mayor after being arrested and indicted by the Special Investigation Department of the Osaka District Public Prosecutors Office in connection with the bid-rigging allegations mentioned later.

In 2011, Nakatsuka ran for mayor of Hirakata in an attempt to make a comeback, but he was defeated.

=== Member of the Osaka Prefectural Assembly ===
In 2015, Nakatsuka ran for the Osaka Prefectural Assembly and won. After the election, he joined One Osaka.

In 2019, he was re-elected in the Osaka Prefectural Assembly election.

=== Member of the House of Representatives ===
In 2020, Nakatsuka became the head of Ishin's Osaka 11th district branch to run in next general election.

In October 2021, Nakatsuka resigned as an Osaka Prefectural Assembly member and ran for Osaka 11th in the 2021 general election. As a result of election, he defeated CDP incumbent Hirofumi Hirano and gain the seat.

In the 2024 general election, Nakatsuka defeated LDP's Saya Ōtsuji and hold the seat.

On 12 August 2025, Nakatsuka became the Secretary-General of the Japan Innovation Party.

In the 2026 general election, Nakatsuka defeated LDP candidate and hold the seat.

On 17 September 2026, Nakatsuka was appointed as minister of state for regulatory reform. He became the first member of his party to enter the cabinet under the Liberal Democratic Party–Japan Innovation Party coalition.

== Scandal ==
=== Bid-rigging ===
In 2007, the Special Investigation Department of the Osaka District Public Prosecutors Office launched a compulsory investigation into suspected government-involved bid-rigging (kansei dango) related to the 2005 tender for the construction of Hirakata City's Second Waste Disposal Plant (a restricted general competitive bidding process).

On 31 July 2007, Nakatsuka was arrested and indicted by the Special Investigation Department on charges of obstructing a public auction/tender, along with an Osaka Prefectural Police assistant inspector and executives from Obayashi Corporation, the firm that won the contract. Following these events, he resigned as Mayor of Hirakata on 10 September of the same year.

On 28 April 2009, the Osaka District Court sentenced him to one year and six months in prison, suspended for three years. While Nakatsuka appealed immediately, the Osaka High Court dismissed the appeal in November 2010. The Supreme Court subsequently rejected his final appeal in February 2013, thereby finalizing his guilty verdict.
