= Osaka 11th district =

Legislative district of Japan

Osaka 11th District
- Parliamentary constituency for the Japanese House of Representatives
- Numbered map of Osaka Prefecture single-member districts
- Prefecture: Osaka
- Proportional District: Kinki
- Electorate: 398,982

Current constituency
- Created: 1994
- Seats: One
- Party: Innovation
- Representative: Hiroshi Nakatsuka
- Municipalities: Hirakata and Katano

Osaka 11th district (大阪府第11区, Osaka-fu dai-ju-ikku or simply 大阪11区, Osaka-ju-ikku) is a single-member constituency of the House of Representatives in the national Diet of Japan located in Osaka Prefecture.

== List of representatives ==
Election	Representative	Party	Notes
1996	Hirofumi Hirano	Independent	
2000	Hirofumi Hirano	Democratic	
2003	Hirofumi Hirano	Democratic	
2005	Hirofumi Hirano	Democratic	
2009	Hirofumi Hirano	Democratic	
2012	Nobuhisa Ito	Restoration	
2014	Yukari Sato	Liberal Democratic	
2017	Hirofumi Hirano	Independent	
2021	Hiroshi Nakatsuka	Innovation	
2024	Hiroshi Nakatsuka	Innovation	
2026	Hiroshi Nakatsuka	Innovation	

== Election results ==
2026
Party	Candidate	Votes	%	±%
Ishin	Hiroshi Nakatsuka (Incumbent)	113,436	49.4	▼6.2
LDP	Naotaka Matsumoto	41,809	18.2	▼10.5
Centrist Reform	Noriatsu Murakami	38,540	16.8	
Sanseitō	Satomi Yamaoka	21,753	9,5	
JCP	Manabu Kitao	14,310	6.2	▼9.5
Registered electors		393,359		
Turnout			59.73	▲4.75
Ishin hold				

2024
Party	Candidate	Votes	%	±%
Innovation	Hiroshi Nakatsuka (Incumbent)	115,411	55.57	▲10.88
Liberal Democratic	Saya Otsuji (Endorsed by Komeito)	59,557	28.67	▼1.16
JCP	Manabu Kitao	32,733	15.76	New
Registered electors		394,545		
Turnout		207,701	54.98	▼5.59
Ishin hold				

2021
Party	Candidate	Votes	%	±%
Innovation	Hiroshi Nakatsuka	105,746	44.69	
Liberal Democratic	Yukari Sato (Incumbent-Kinki PR block)	70,568	29.83	
CDP	Hirofumi Hirano (Incumbent)	60,281	25.48	New
Registered electors		398,749		
Turnout			60.57	▲7.54
Ishin gain from CDP				

2017
Party	Candidate	Votes	%	±%
Independent	Hirofumi Hirano (Incumbent-Kinki PR block)	76,144	36.72	
Liberal Democratic	Yukari Sato (Incumbent) (elected by Kinki PR block)	69,366	33.45	
Innovation	Nobuhisa Ito (Incumbent-Kinki PR block)	61,859	29.83	New
Registered electors		400,367		
Turnout			53.03	▼3.01
Independent gain from LDP				

2014
Party	Candidate	Votes	%	±%
Liberal Democratic	Yukari Sato	73,931	34.56	
Democratic	Hirofumi Hirano (elected by Kinki PR block)	61,216	28.62	
Innovation	Nobuhisa Ito (Incumbent) (elected by Kinki PR block)	58,321	27.26	New
Communist	Tomoyuki Miwa	20,449	9.56	
Registered electors		390,435		
Turnout			56.04	
LDP gain from Ishin				

2012
Party	Candidate	Votes	%	±%
Restoration	Nobuhisa Ito	93,763	40.34	New
Democratic	Hirofumi Hirano (Incumbent)	67,756	29.15	
Liberal Democratic	Nobuko Iwaki	51,110	21.99	
Communist	Tomoyuki Miwa	19,823	8.53	
Turnout				
Restoration gain from Democratic				

2009
Party	Candidate	Votes	%	±%
Democratic	Hirofumi Hirano (Incumbent)	156,002	59.54	
Liberal Democratic	Nobuko Iwaki (Incumbent-Kinki PR block)	70,309	26.83	
Communist	Kyoko Yamashita	30,680	11.71	
Happiness Realization	Akira Yamauchi	5,041	1.92	New
Turnout				
Democratic hold				

2005
Party	Candidate	Votes	%	±%
Democratic	Hirofumi Hirano (Incumbent)	121,328	48.11	
Liberal Democratic	Nobuko Iwaki	98,613	39.11	
Communist	Kyoko Yamashita	32,230	12.78	
Turnout				
Democratic hold				

2003
Party	Candidate	Votes	%	±%
Democratic	Hirofumi Hirano (Incumbent)	116,834	58.31	
Independent	Masumi Ogawa	47,385	23.65	New
Communist	Kyoko Yamashita	27,557	13.75	
Independent	Nobuaki Yoshitake	8,599	4.29	New
Turnout				
Democratic hold				

2000
Party	Candidate	Votes	%	±%
Democratic	Hirofumi Hirano (Incumbent)	120,895	55.47	
Liberal Democratic	Kazutaka Tsuboi	59,803	27.44	
Communist	Kyoko Yamashita	37,255	17.09	
Turnout				
Democratic hold				

1996
Party	Candidate	Votes	%	±%
Independent	Hirofumi Hirano	97,294	48.59	
Liberal Democratic	Masumi Ogawa	64,535	32.23	New
Communist	Takako Kichise	38,403	19.18	New
Turnout				
