= Gifu 1st district =

Legislative district of Japan

Gifu 1st District
- Parliamentary constituency for the Japanese House of Representatives
- Numbered map of Gifu Prefecture single-member districts
- Prefecture: Gifu
- Major settlements: Gifu

Current constituency
- Created: 1994
- Party: LDP
- Representative: Seiko Noda

Gifu 1st district (Gifu-ken dai-ikku) is a single-member electoral district for the House of Representatives, the lower house of the National Diet of Japan. It is located in Gifu Prefecture and covers the capital city Gifu. In September 2023 the district had 334,642 eligible voters. In 2012 they were 325,090.

Before the electoral reform of 1994, Western Gifu including Gifu City had formed the five-member Gifu 1st district. In the last pre-reform House of Representatives election of 1993, representatives included top-elected Iwao Matsuda for the Renewal Party, third-ranking Seiko Noda for the Liberal Democratic Party and fourth-ranking Socialist Kazō Watanabe. These three representatives were the main contestants of the new single-member 1st district in the 1996 election. Noda won and held on to the seat in subsequent elections. In 2005, she was a postal privatization rebel, but defended the seat against "assassin" candidate Yukari Satō. Noda returned to the party in 2006.

In the landslide Liberal Democratic defeat of 2009, Noda lost the seat to Democrat Masanao Shibahashi and only remained in the House via the Tōkai proportional block. In the landslide Democratic defeat of 2012, Noda regained the district at low turnout.

== List of representatives ==
| Representative | Party | Dates | Notes |
|---|---|---|---|
| Seiko Noda | LDP | 1996–2005 | |
| Seiko Noda | Independent (postal privatization rebel) | 2005–2009 | Returned to the LDP in 2006, re-elected in the Tōkai block |
| Masanao Shibahashi | DPJ | 2009–2012 | Failed re-election in the Tōkai block |
| Seiko Noda | LDP | 2012– | Incumbent |

== Election results ==
2026
| Party | Candidate | Votes | % | ±% |
|---|---|---|---|---|
| LDP | Seiko Noda | 90,249 | 55.8 | ▼11.7 |
| Centrist Reform | Manabu Hattori | 36,657 | 22.7 | |
| Sanseitō | Mayura Narui | 26,146 | 16.2 | |
| JCP | Junko Hatano | 8,658 | 5.4 | ▼27.1 |
| Turnout | | 161,710 | 50.13 | ▼1.46 |
| LDP hold | | | | |

2024
| Party | Candidate | Votes | % | ±% |
|---|---|---|---|---|
| LDP | Seiko Noda | 100,226 | 67.5 | ▲5.0 |
| JCP | Toru Yamakoshi | 48,325 | 32.5 | ▲26.6 |
| Turnout | | | 48.67 | ▼3.64 |
| LDP hold | | | | |

2021
| Party | Candidate | Votes | % | ±% |
|---|---|---|---|---|
| LDP | Seiko Noda | 103,805 | 62.5 | ▼2.0 |
| CDP | Keisuke Kawamoto | 48,629 | 29.3 | |
| JCP | Toru Yamakoshi | 9,846 | 5.9 | |
| Reform Future Party | Masamitsu Tsuchida | 3,698 | 2.2 | |
| Turnout | | | 52.31 | ▲1.83 |
| LDP hold | | | | |

2017
| Party | Candidate | Votes | % | ±% |
|---|---|---|---|---|
| LDP | Seiko Noda | 103,453 | 64.5 | ▲7.0 |
| Independent | Rie Yoshida | 43,688 | 27.2 | |
| Independent | Taisuke Hattori | 8,113 | 5.1 | |
| Happiness Realization | Noriko Nohara | 5,124 | 3.2 | |
| Turnout | | | 50.48 | ▲4.44 |
| LDP hold | | | | |

2014
| Party | Candidate | Votes | % | ±% |
|---|---|---|---|---|
| LDP | Seiko Noda | 82,434 | 57.5 | ▲7.5 |
| Democratic | Rie Yoshida | 38,402 | 26.8 | ▼3.2 |
| JCP | Shizuka Ōsuga | 22,647 | 15.8 | ▲8.8 |
| Turnout | | | 46.04 | ▼11.83 |
| LDP hold | | | | |

2012
| Party | Candidate | Votes | % | ±% |
|---|---|---|---|---|
| LDP | Seiko Noda | 90,164 | 49.9 | +5.4 |
| Democratic | Masanao Shibahashi | 54,254 | 30.0 | −20.0 |
| Tomorrow | Tamiko Kasahara (endorsed by New Party Daichi | 21,294 | 11.8 | new |
| JCP | Masanori Suzuki | 12,687 | 7.0 | +2.6 |
| Happiness Realization | Noriko Nohara | 2,179 | 1.2 | new |
| Turnout | | | 57.90 | ▼12.09 |
| LDP gain from Democratic | | | | |

2009
| Party | Candidate | Votes | % | ±% |
|---|---|---|---|---|
| DPJ | Masanao Shibahashi | 111,987 | 50.0 | +33.1 |
| LDP | Seiko Noda (won proportional seat) | 99,500 | 44.5 | +1.7 |
| JCP | Masanori Suzuki | 9,832 | 4.4 | new |
| HRP | Kazue Ozawa | 2,508 | 1.1 | new |

2005
| Party | Candidate | Votes | % | ±% |
|---|---|---|---|---|
| Independent | Seiko Noda | 96,985 | 42.8 | −8.6 |
| LDP | Yukari Satō (won proportional seat) | 84,189 | 35.9 | new |
| DPJ | Masanao Shibahashi | 38,349 | 16.9 | new |
| JCP | Satoru Ogawa | 9,970 | 4.4 | new |

2003
| Party | Candidate | Votes | % | ±% |
|---|---|---|---|---|
| LDP | Seiko Noda | 92,717 | 51.4 | −0.9 |
| DPJ | Makoto Asano | 71,649 | 39.7 | new |
| JCP | Ritsuko Kinoshita | 15,951 | 8.8 | −2.4 |

2000
| Party | Candidate | Votes | % | ±% |
|---|---|---|---|---|
| LDP | Seiko Noda | 100,425 | 52.3 | +15.2 |
| DPJ | Kazō Watanabe | 56,751 | 29.6 | +12.0 |
| JCP | Ritsuko Kinoshita | 21,523 | 11.2 | +1.0 |
| SDP | Jirō Toda | 11,171 | 5.8 | new |
| LL | Kiyosuke Mamiya | 1,975 | 1.0 | new |

1996
| Party | Candidate | Votes | % | ±% |
|---|---|---|---|---|
| LDP | Seiko Noda | 70,799 | 37.1 | N/A |
| NFP | Iwao Matsuda | 66,892 | 35.1 | N/A |
| DPJ | Kazō Watanabe | 33,640 | 17.6 | N/A |
| JCP | Ritsuko Kinoshita | 19,509 | 10.2 | N/A |
