= Yukari Sato =

Japanese economist and politician

Yukari Satō
- 佐藤 ゆかり
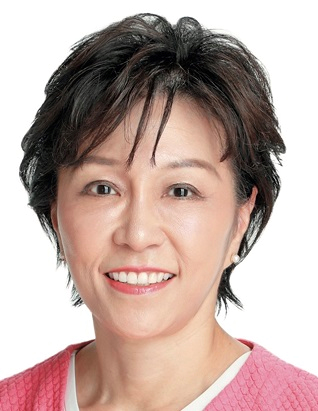
- Official portrait, 2019

Member of the House of Representatives
- In office 15 December 2014 – 14 October 2021
- Preceded by: Nobuhisa Itō
- Succeeded by: Multi-member district
- Constituency: Osaka 11th (2014–2017); Kinki PR (2017–2021)
- In office 11 September 2005 – 21 July 2009
- Constituency: Tōkai PR

Member of the House of Councillors
- In office 26 July 2010 – 21 November 2014
- Preceded by: Multi-member district
- Succeeded by: Masashi Adachi
- Constituency: National PR

Personal details
- Born: 19 August 1961 (age 65) Setagaya, Tokyo, Japan
- Party: Liberal Democratic
- Relatives: Shunichi Matsumoto (uncle); Katsuhiko Yokomitsu (cousin)
- Education: Columbia University; New York University
- Website: http://www.satoyukari.jp (in Japanese)

Yukari Satō (佐藤 ゆかり, Satō Yukari; born 19 August 1961) is a Japanese economist and former politician of the Liberal Democratic Party.

== Early life and education ==
A native of Setagaya, Tokyo, Satō received a bachelor's degree in political science from Columbia University, a master's degree in international affairs from Columbia University, and a Ph.D. in economics from New York University. She also studied abroad in the University of Paris (Nanterre) and the Graduate Institute of International and Development Studies in Geneva. She began her economic career in 1998 as an economist at Nikko Citigroup Securities, and then worked for JPMorgan Securities and finally as chief economist at Credit Suisse First Boston in Japan.

While being economist in the financial industry, Sato also served as a member of the Industrial Structure Council of the Ministry of Economy, Trade and Industry (METI), a member of the Working Group on Taxation Problems of the Ministry of Finance (MOF), an advisor to LDP’s committee on fiscal reconstruction, as well as providing policy recommendations to members of the Bank of Japan’s Policy Board, and other ministries, including the Cabinet Office, of the Japanese government.

== Political career ==
Satō was elected to the House of Representatives for the first time in 2005, as part of a group of candidates of Liberal Democratic Party (LDP) hand-picked by Prime Minister Junichiro Koizumi. Sato was sent to the constituency of Seiko Noda, the Gifu 1st district, with Noda having left the LDP after opposing Koizumi's plan to privatize Japan Post. Noda prevailed in the district, but Sato won a seat through the proportional representation list.

Sato and Noda publicly made amends prior to the 2009 general election, in which Sato was assigned to run for a different seat, the Tokyo 5th district. In the wake of the overwhelming victory of the Democratic Party of Japan (DPJ) in the 2009 general elections, Sato also lost the race in the Tokyo 5th district, but was elected to the House of Councillors in 2010. After serving almost five years in the House of Councillors, LDP sent Sato back to the House of Representatives to run for the Osaka 11th district in the 2014 general election, in which she won.

In December 2012, Sato was appointed to the Parliamentary Vice-Minister for Economy, Trade and Industry, to formulate the growth policy for “the Abenomics,” at the time Prime Minister Shinzo Abe took over the government from DPJ. In October 2018, Sato was appointed as the State Minister for Internal Affairs and Communications, to handle Japan’s telecommunications policy in such cutting-edge areas as 5G, IoT, big data, and artificial intelligence (AI), as well as broadcasting and the Japan Post group.

During her time in the Diet (national legislature), Sato also served on many committees and held several party offices, including:

- Vice Chairman, LDP Committee on Science, Technology and Innovations
- Vice Chairman, LDP Committee on Small and Medium-sized Enterprise Policies
- Vice Chairman, LDP Committee on Tourism Nation Building
- Deputy Chairman, LDP Committee on Foreign Affairs and Economic Pact Agreements (EPAs)
- Chairman, Special Committee on Consumer Problems of the House of Councillors
- Chairman, LDP Members’ Association to Consider Japan’s Prosperity in Global Society
- Parliamentary Vice-Minister of Economy, Trade and Industry
- Deputy Secretary-General of LDP
- Deputy Chairman, LDP Policy Board in the House of Councillors
- Minister of State for Economic, Fiscal and Finance Policy of LDP's Shadow Cabinet
- Vice-Chairman, Committee on Organizations Involved with Public Finance, Finance and Securities of LDP
