= Toy dog =

Dog type

Toy dog traditionally refers to a very small dog or a grouping of small breeds of dog. A toy dog may be of any of various dog types. Types of dogs referred to as toy dogs may include spaniels, pinschers and terriers that have been bred down in size. Not all toy dogs are lap dogs.

== Small dogs ==
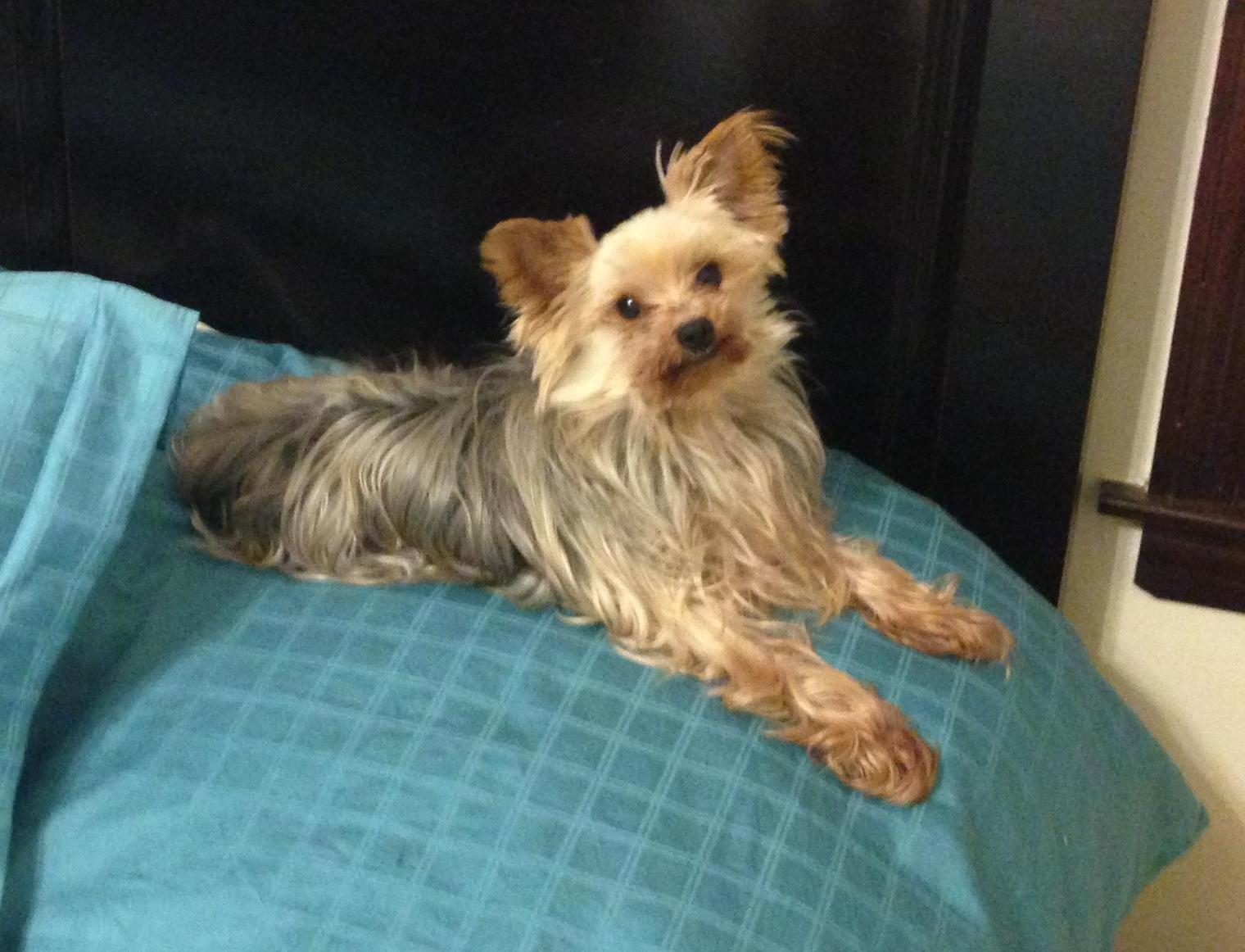
The Yorkshire Terrier is one of the most popular of the toy breeds.

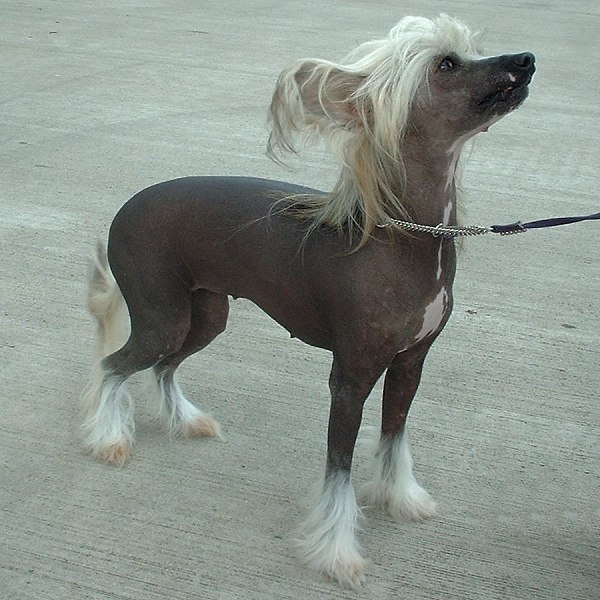
The Chinese Crested Dog is a hairless toy breed.

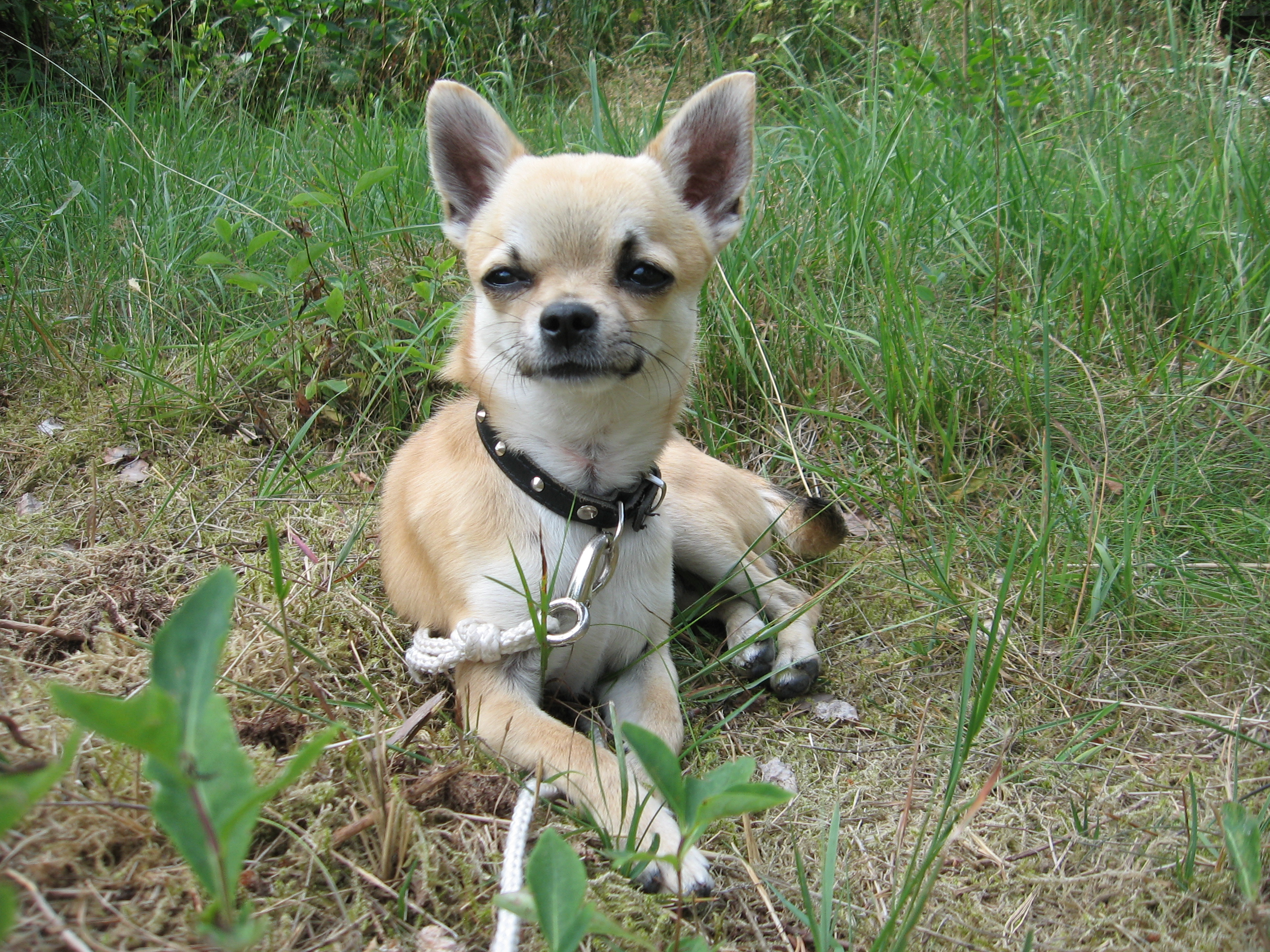
Chihuahua

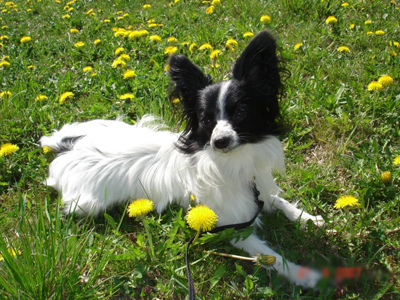
Papillon

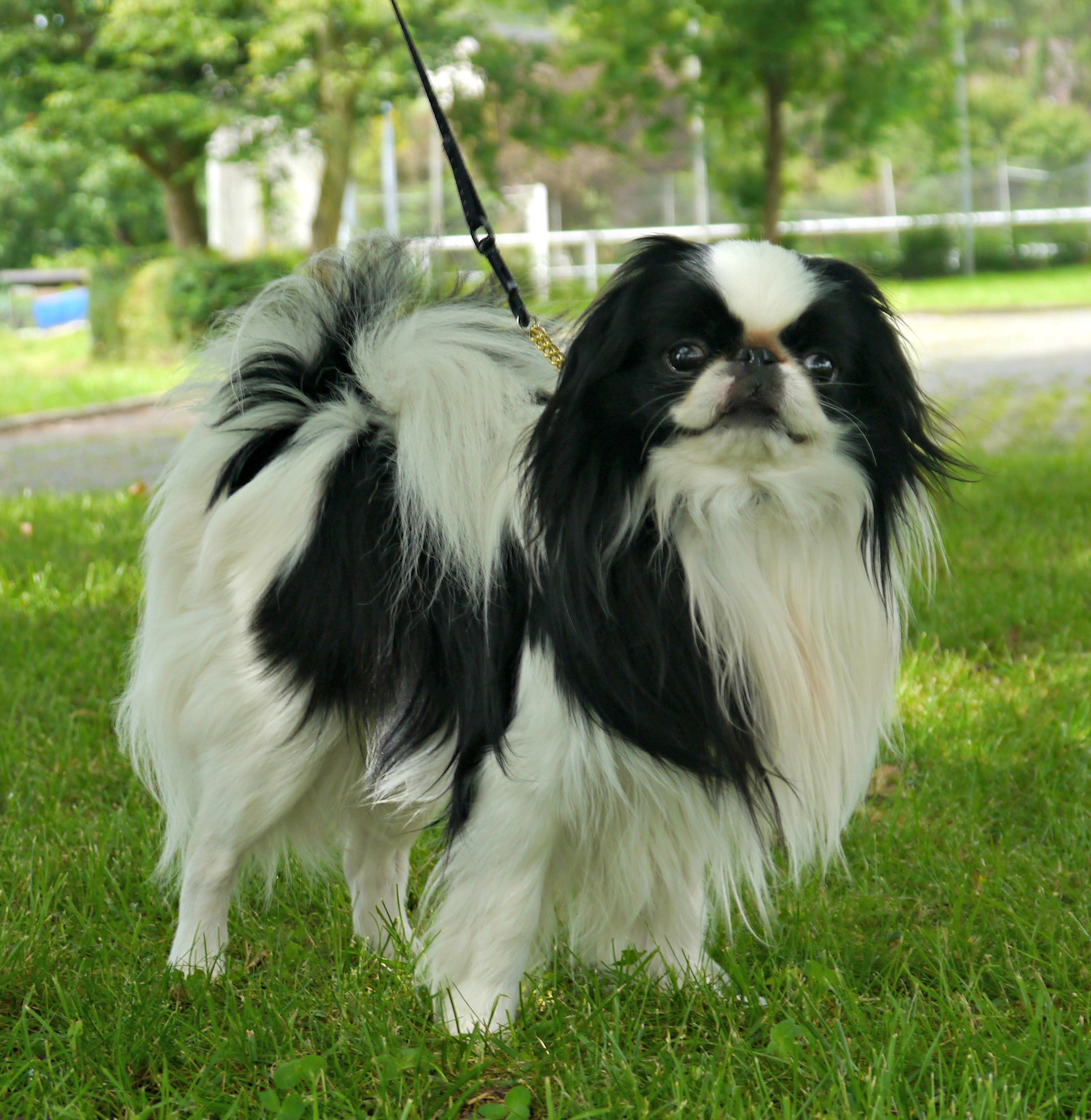
Japanese Chin

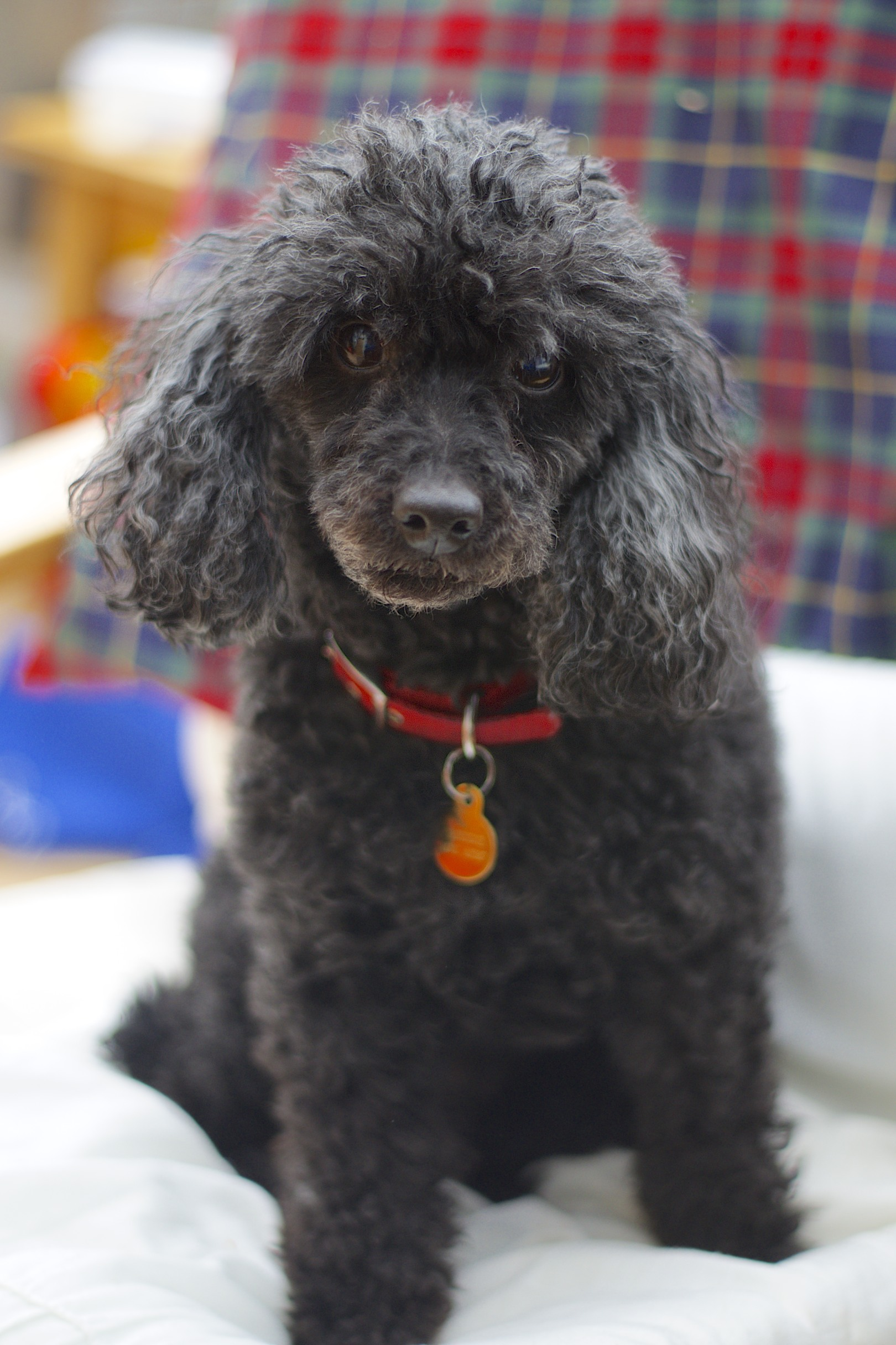
Toy Poodle

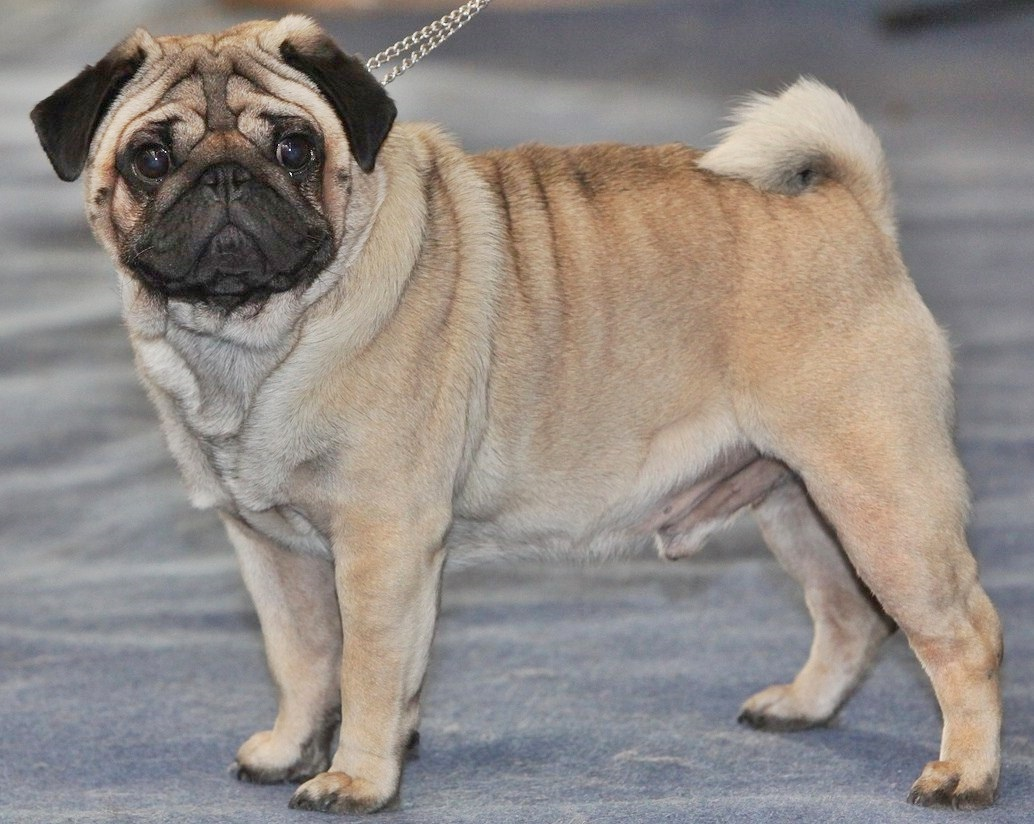
Pug

Dogs found in the toy group of breed registries may be of the very ancient lapdog type, or they may be small versions of hunting dogs or working dogs, bred down in size for a particular kind of work or to create a pet of convenient size. In the past, very small dogs not used for hunting were kept as symbols of affluence, as watchdogs, and for the health function of attracting fleas away from their owners. Dogs that are especially small for their breed are also known as teacup dogs.

== Breeds ==
Most major dog clubs in the English-speaking world have a toy group, under one exact name or another, in which they place breeds of dog that the kennel club categorizes as toy, based on size and tradition. The Kennel Club (UK), the Canadian Kennel Club, the American Kennel Club, the Australian National Kennel Council, and the New Zealand Kennel Club all have a group named "Toy", although they may not all categorise the same breeds in this category. The United States has a second major kennel club, the United Kennel Club (UKC, originally formed for hunting and working breeds, though general today), and it does not recognize such a group; instead, small dogs are placed with larger dogs of their type, or into a UKC's "Companion Dog" group. As of September 2008, the American Kennel Club began debating whether or not to change the name of their "Toy" group to "Companion", in order to emphasise that dogs are not playthings, but the name change was resisted by traditionalists.

The breeds in the "Companion and Toy" category of the Fédération Cynologique Internationale are:

- Bichon Frisé
- Bichon Havanais, Havanese
- Bolognese
- Boston Terrier
- Bouledogue Français, French Bulldog
- Caniche, Poodle
- Cavalier King Charles Spaniel
- Chihuahueño, Chihuahua
- Chin, Japanese Chin
- Chinese Crested Dog
- Coton de Tuléar
- Epagneul Nain Continental, Continental Toy Spaniel, with sub-types Papillon and Phalène
- Griffon Belge
- Griffon Bruxellois, Brussels Griffon
- King Charles Spaniel
- Kromfohrländer
- Lhasa Apso
- Maltese
- Pekingese
- Petit Brabançon, Small Brabant Griffon
- Petit Chien Lion, Löwchen, Little Lion Dog
- Pug
- Russkiy Toy, Russian Toy Terrier, Russian Toy Dog
- Shih Tzu
- Tibetan Spaniel
- Tibetan Terrier

Small or toy-sized breeds not classified by the FCI in its toy group include:

- Affenpinscher
- Australian Silky Terrier
- Italian Greyhound
- Miniature Pinscher
- Dwarf German Spitz: Pomeranian
- Volpino Italiano
- Yorkshire Terrier
- Xoloitzcuintle

Member kennel clubs of the Fédération Cynologique Internationale and non-member clubs may use slightly different nomenclature, depending on the country. The term toy is only used to group dogs for show purposes.

Some breeds without FCI recognition are recognised by The Kennel Club of Great Britain (UK), by the Canadian Kennel Club (Can), or by the American Kennel Club:

- Chihuahua (Long Coat) (UK, Aus, NZ, Can)
- Chihuahua (Smooth Coat) (UK, Aus, NZ)
- Chihuahua (Short Coat) (Can)
- Mi-Ki (US)
- Toy Fox Terrier (US)
- Toy Manchester Terrier (Can, US)

The major national kennel club for each country will have its own list of breeds that it recognizes as Toy. In addition, some new or newly documented rare breeds may be awaiting approval by a given kennel club. Some new breeds may currently be recognized only by their breed clubs. Some rare new breeds have been given breed names, but may only be available from the breeder or breeders who are developing the breed, and may not yet be recognized by any kennel club.

In addition to the major registries, there are a plethora of sporting clubs, breed clubs, and internet-based breed registries and businesses in which dogs may be registered in whatever way the owner or seller wishes.

== See also ==
- List of toy terriers
- Teacup dog
