= French Bulldog =

French breed of dog

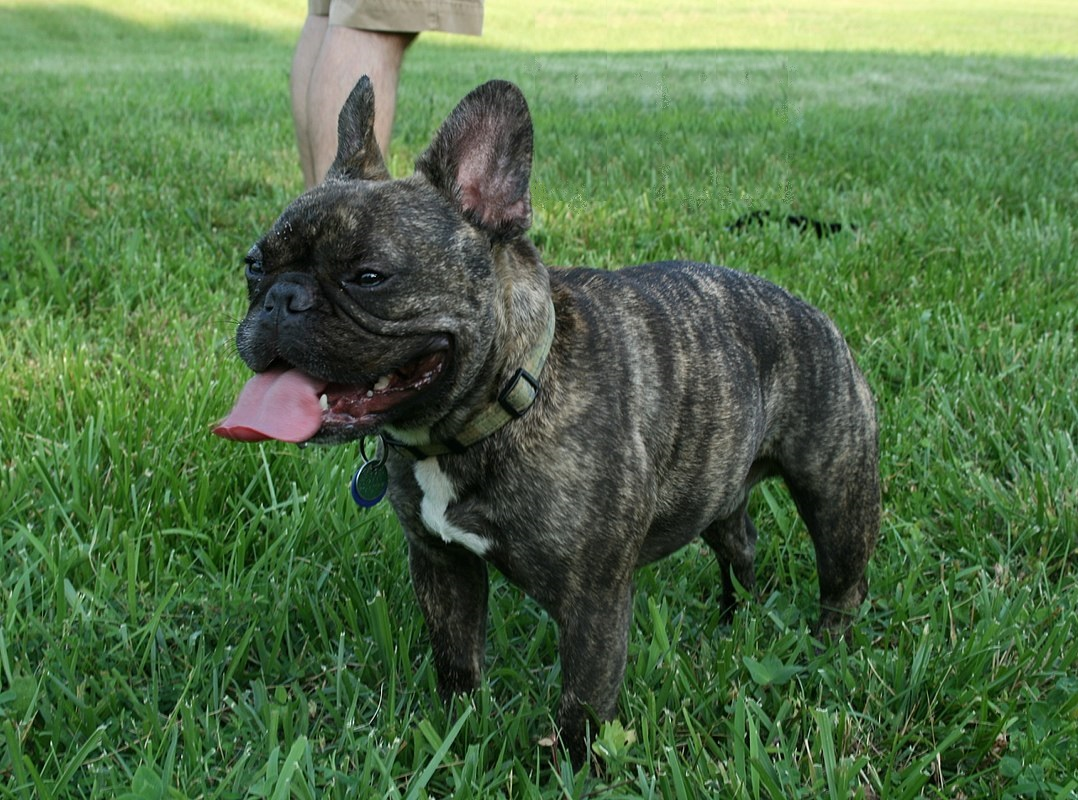
- Other names: Bouledogue Français
- Origin: France
Traits
| Height | Males | 27–35 cm (11–14 in) |
| | Females | 24–32 cm (9.4–12.6 in) |
| Weight | Males | 9–14 kg (20–31 lb) |
| | Females | 8–13 kg (18–29 lb) |
Kennel club standards
- Société Centrale Canine: standard
- Fédération Cynologique Internationale: standard

The French Bulldog (French: Bouledogue Français) is a French breed of companion dog or toy dog. It appeared in Paris in the mid-nineteenth century, apparently the result of cross-breeding of Toy Bulldogs imported from England and local Parisian ratters. It is commonly kept as a pet and is among the most frequently registered dogs in a number of countries including Australia, the United Kingdom, and the United States. The breed is susceptible to various health problems due to being bred for its distinctive flat face and skin wrinkles.

== History ==
From the beginning of the nineteenth century, bulldogs were bred in the United Kingdom for purposes other than traditional blood sports such as bull-baiting, which were banned in 1835. By the middle of the century there were miniature bulldogs, most weighing around 7–11 kg (15–24 lb).

At the same time, lace workers from Nottingham who were displaced by the Industrial Revolution began to settle in Normandy, France. They brought a variety of dogs with them, including Toy Bulldogs. The dogs became popular in France and a trade in imported small Bulldogs was created, with breeders in England sending over Bulldogs that they considered to be too small, or with faults such as ears that stood up. By 1860, there were few Toy Bulldogs left in England, such was their popularity in France.

The small Bulldog type gradually became thought of as a breed, and received a name, the Bouledogue Français. This French version of the English name is also a contraction of the words boule ('ball') and dogue ('mastiff'). The dogs were highly fashionable and were sought after by society ladies and Parisian prostitutes alike, as well as creators such as artists, writers, and fashion designers. The artists Edgar Degas and Henri de Toulouse-Lautrec are thought to have French Bulldogs in their paintings. However, records were not kept of the breed's development as it diverged further away from its original Bulldog roots. As it changed, terrier stock had been brought in to develop traits such as the breed's long straight ears.

=== Depictions in nineteenth-century paintings ===
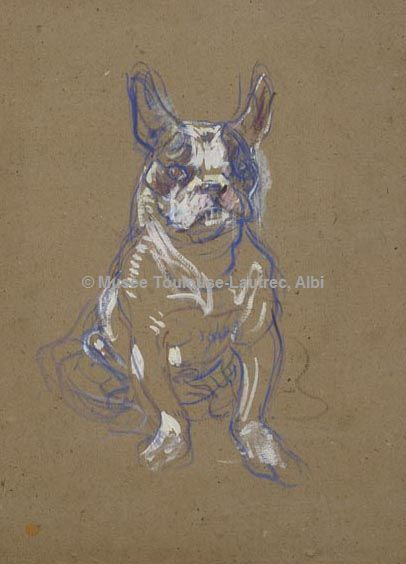
Toulouse-Lautrec: Bouboule, Bull-dog de madame Palmyre, à la souris, 1897

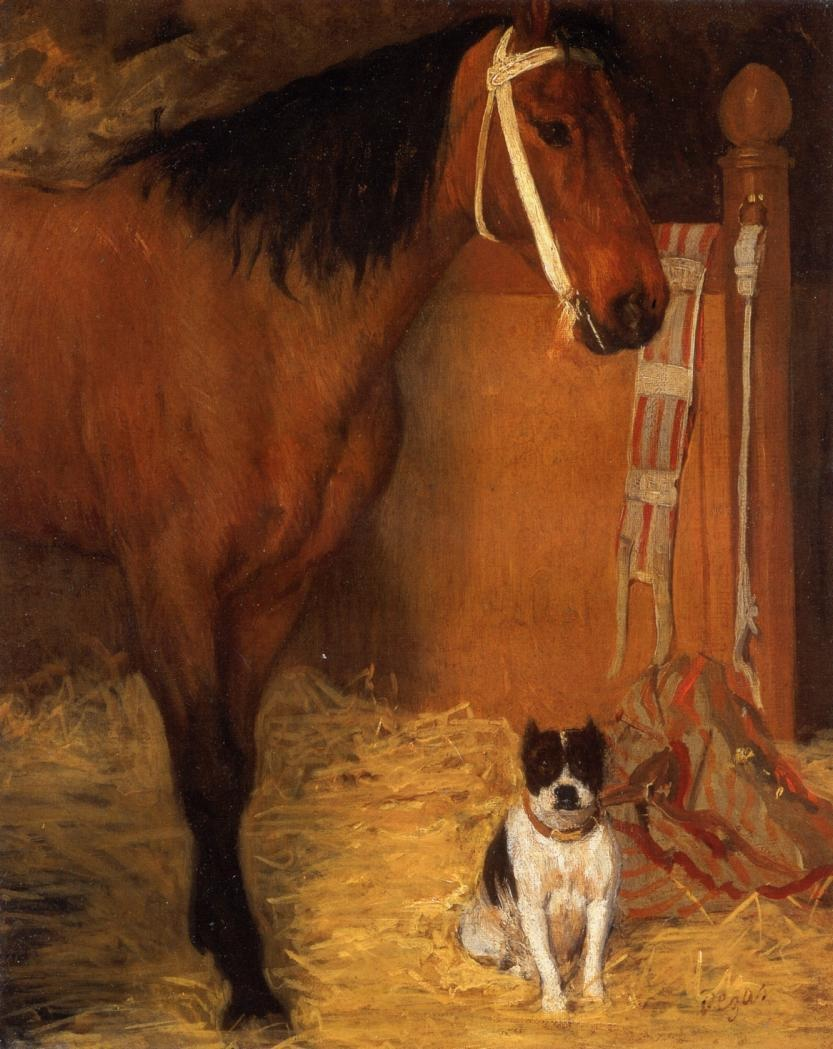
A l'écurie, cheval et chien, Edgar Degas, about 1861

Toulouse-Lautrec

Toulouse-Lautrec

=== Breed clubs and modern recognition ===
Americans had been importing French Bulldogs for a while, but it was not until 1885 that they were brought over in order to set up an American-based breeding program. They were mostly owned by society ladies, who first displayed them at the Westminster Kennel Club Dog Show in 1896. In the following year, the judge at the dog show, George Raper, only chose winners with "rose ears"—ears that folded at the tip, as with the standard for Bulldogs. The ladies formed the French Bull Dog Club of America and created a breed standard which preferred the "erect bat ear" type.In the early 20th century, the breed remained in vogue for high society, with dogs changing hands for up to $3,000 and being owned by members of influential families such as the Rockefellers and the J. P. Morgans. The American Kennel Club recognized the breed quickly after the breed club was formed, and by 1906 the French Bulldog was the fifth most popular dog breed in America.

This new Bulldog breed arrived for the first time in England in 1893, with English Bulldog breeders in an uproar as the French imports did not meet the new breed standards in place by this time, and they wanted to prevent the English stock from crossbreeding with the French. The Kennel Club initially recognized them as a subset of the existing Bulldog breed rather than an entirely new breed. Some English breeders in this period bred the French Bulldogs in order to resurrect the Toy Bulldog. On 10 July 1902, at the house of Frederick W. Cousens, a meeting was held to set up a breed club in order to seek individual recognition for the French breed. The adopted breed standard was the same one which was already in use in America, France, Germany and Austria. Despite opposition from Miniature Bulldog (the new breed name for the Toy Bulldog) and Bulldog breeders, in 1905, the Kennel Club changed its policy on the breed and recognized them separate from the English variety, initially as the Bouledogue Français, then in 1912 as the French Bulldog.

Today the French Bulldog is commonly kept as a pet: in 2020, it was the second-most registered dog in the United Kingdom, and the fourth-most in the United States. They were rated the third-most popular dog in Australia in 2017. In 2019, in the United Kingdom, the French Bulldog had a total of 33,661 registered dogs. By comparison, the Labrador Retriever had over 36,700 dogs and the Cocker Spaniel fewer than 22,000. In 2013, the American Kennel Club (AKC) ranked the French Bulldog as the 10th most popular breed in the United States, enjoying a sharp rise in popularity from 54th place a decade before, in 2003. In 2023, the French Bulldog overtook the Labrador as the most popular breed of dog as ranked by the AKC. Before 2023, Labradors had held the top spot for 31 years. Most recently, the American Kennel Club has found the French Bulldog to be the most popular dog breed in 2024.

==== Historic photographs ====
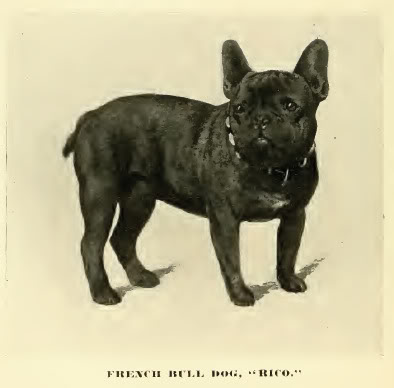
1890

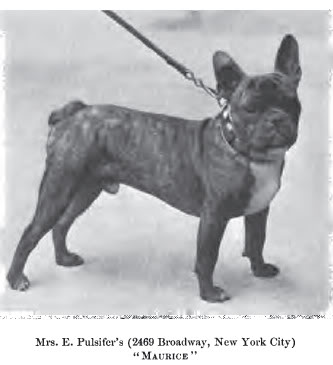
1901, Maurice in New York City

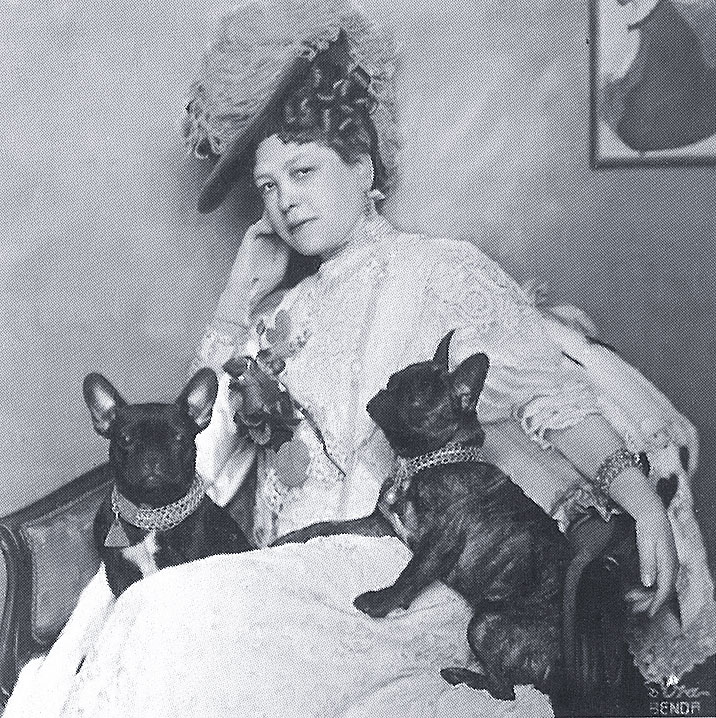
1908, Anna Sacher

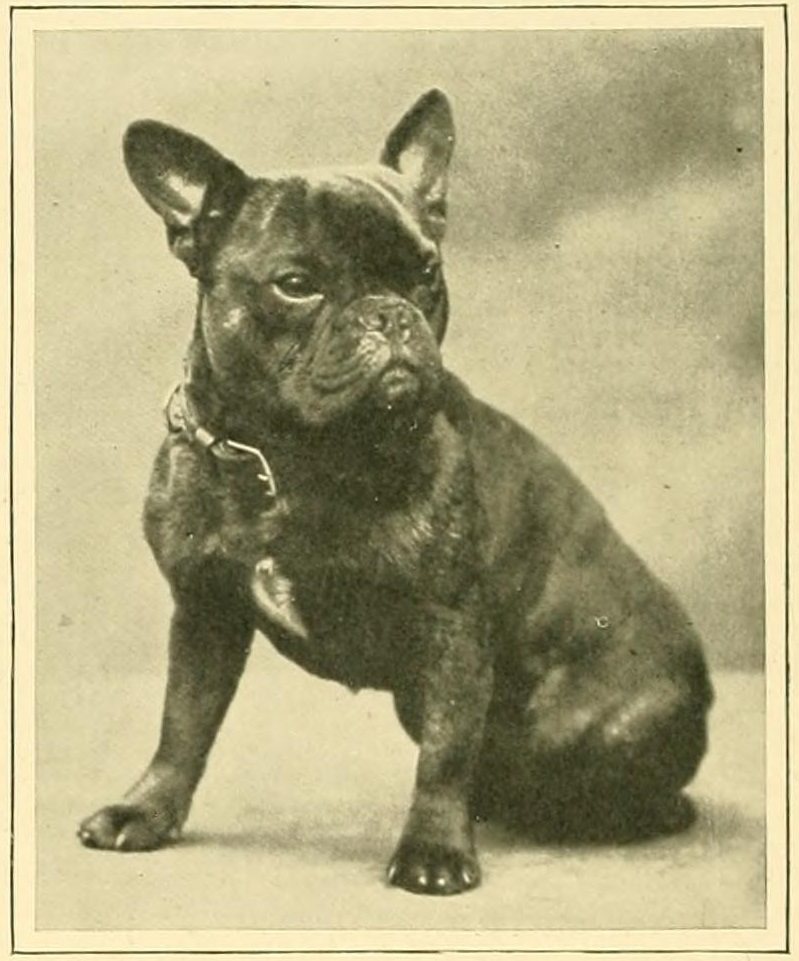
1911, Ch. Stanmore Argus

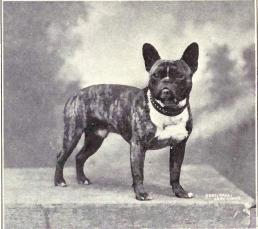
1915

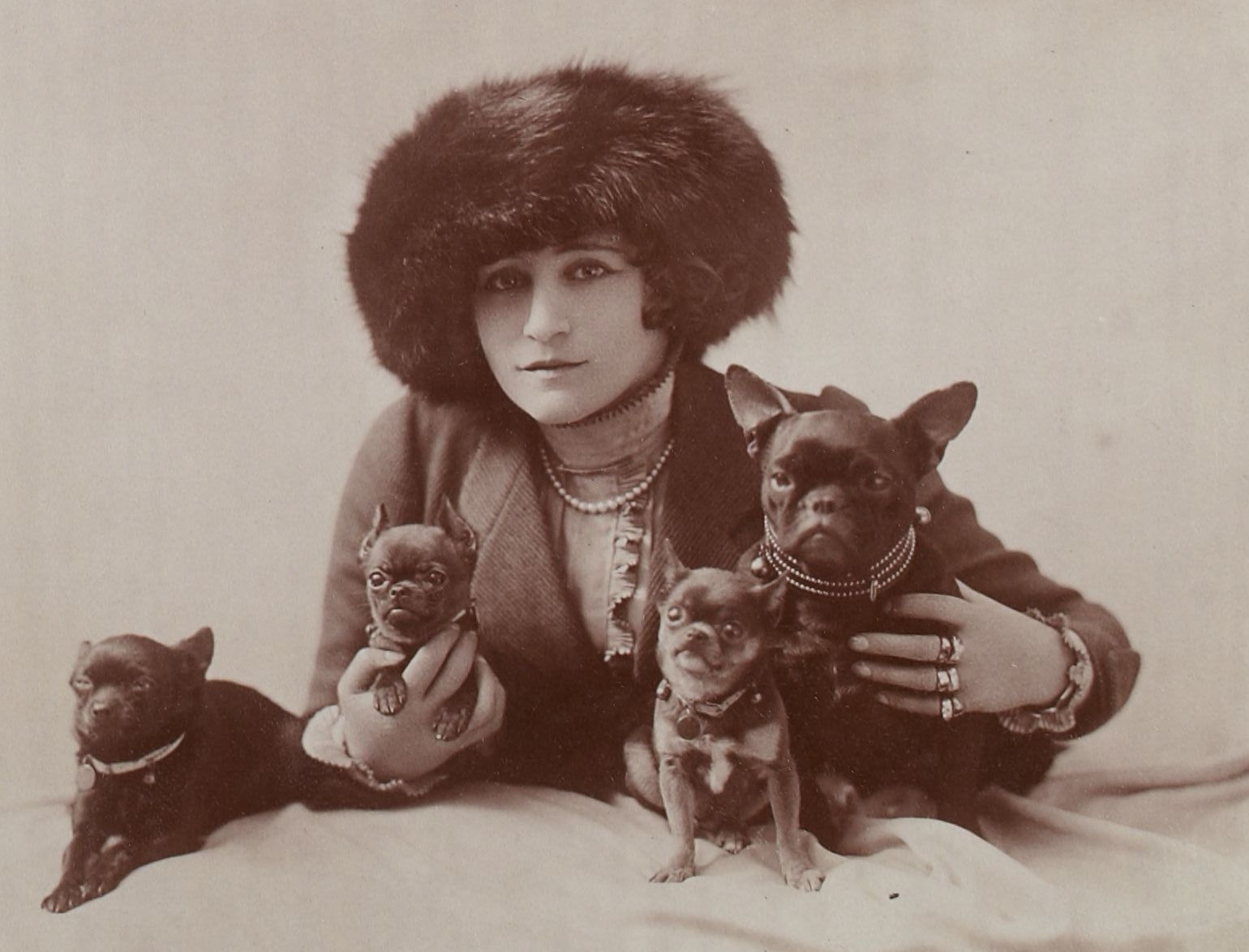
Between 1910 and 1914, Colette with four French Bulldogs

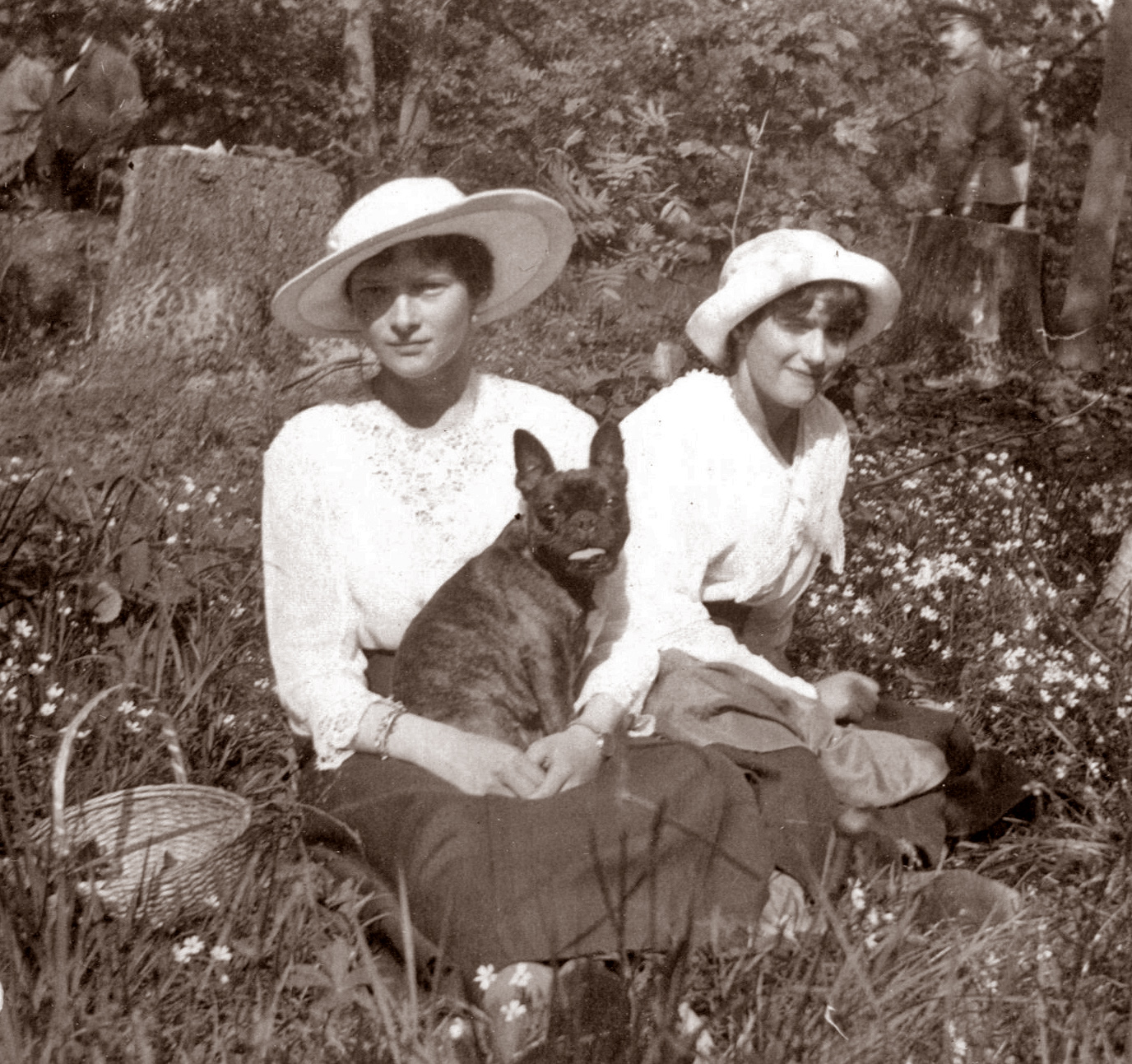
1917 with Grand Duchesses Tatiana and Anastasia Nikolaevna of Russia

== Description ==
The American Kennel Club standard for the French Bulldog states that it should be muscular, with a soft and loose coat forming wrinkles.

The AKC Standard weight for a French Bulldog is at maximum 28 pounds (13 kg). The head of a French bulldog should be square shaped and large, with ears that resemble bat ears. French bulldogs are a flat-faced breed. Eyes that are AKC Standard approved for French Bulldogs are dark, almost to the point of being black; blue eyed French bulldogs are not AKC approved. The coat of a French bulldog should be short haired and fine and silky. Acceptable colors under the breed standard are the various shades of brindle, fawn, cream or white with brindle patches (known as "pied"). The fawn colors can be any shade. The most common colors are brindle, then fawn, with pieds being less common than the other colors. The breed clubs do not recognize any other colors or patterns.

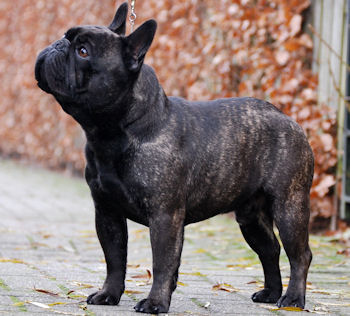
Brindle

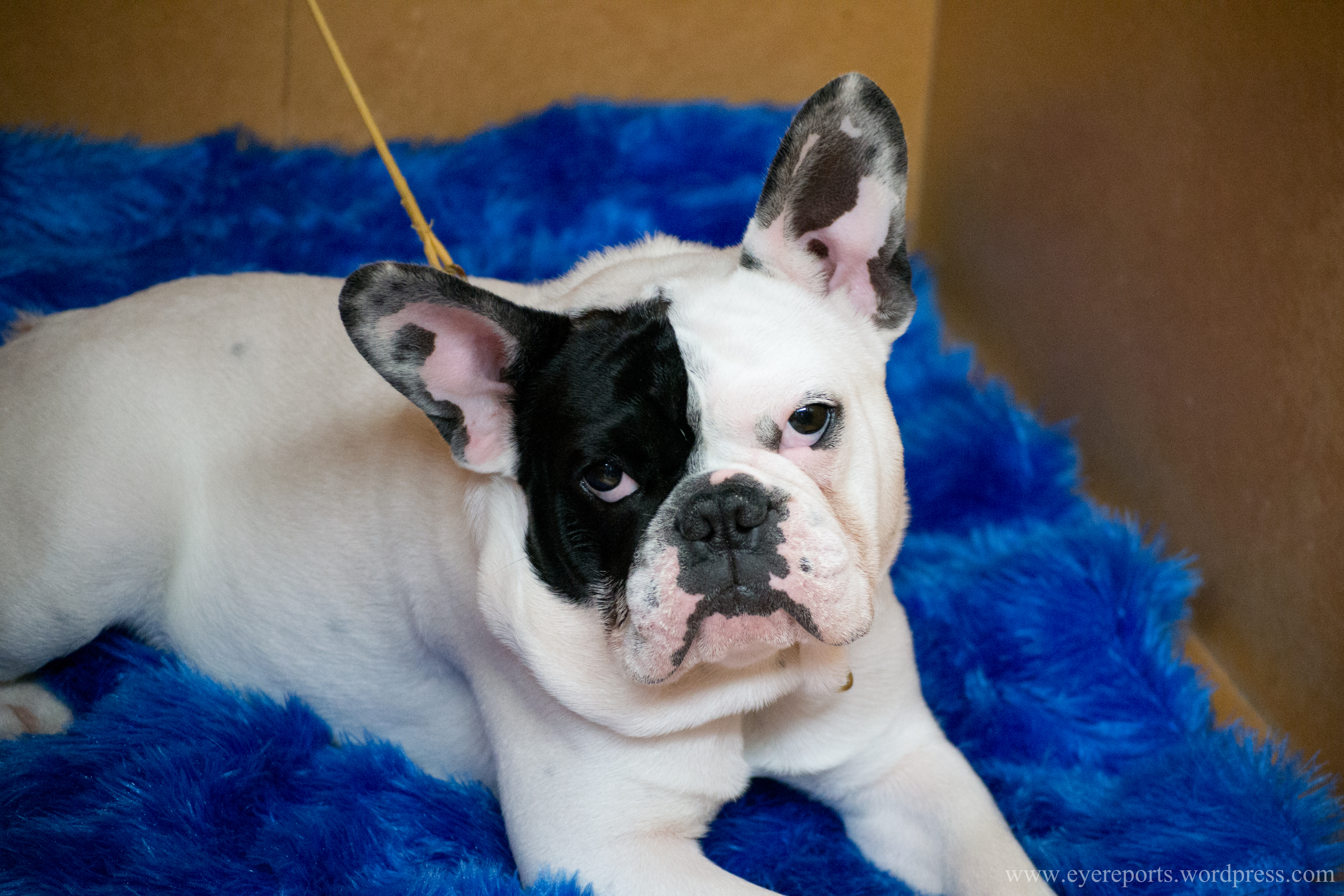
Pied

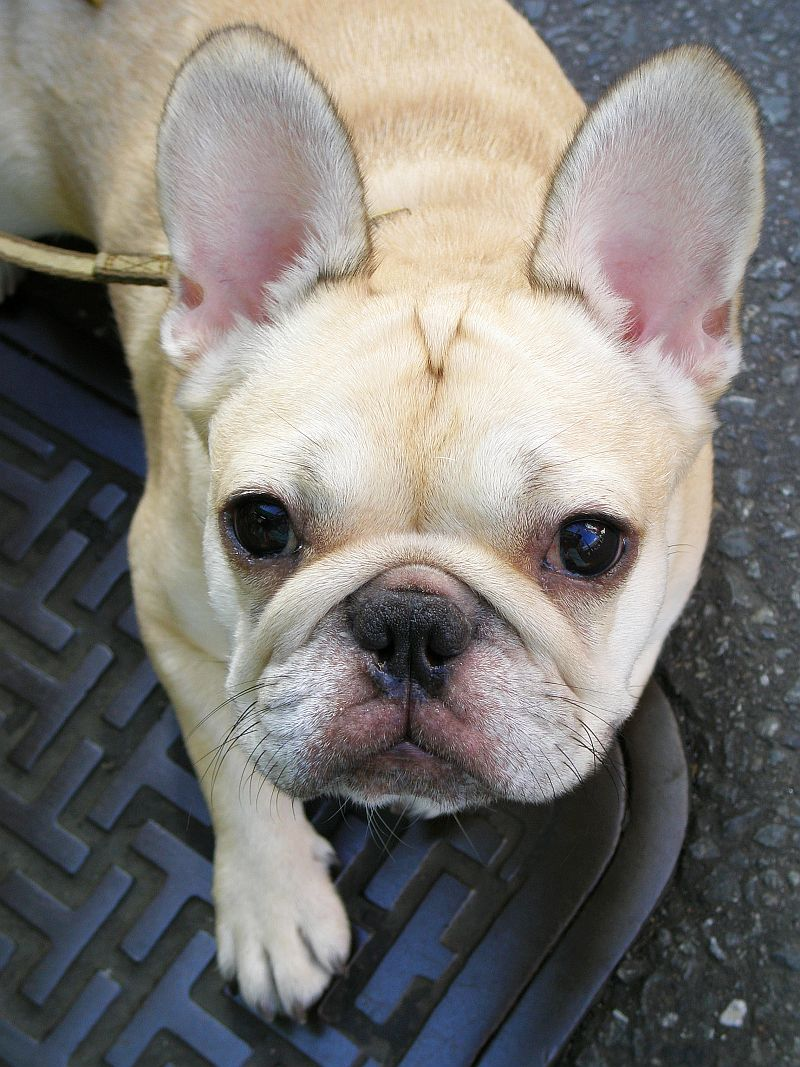
Cream

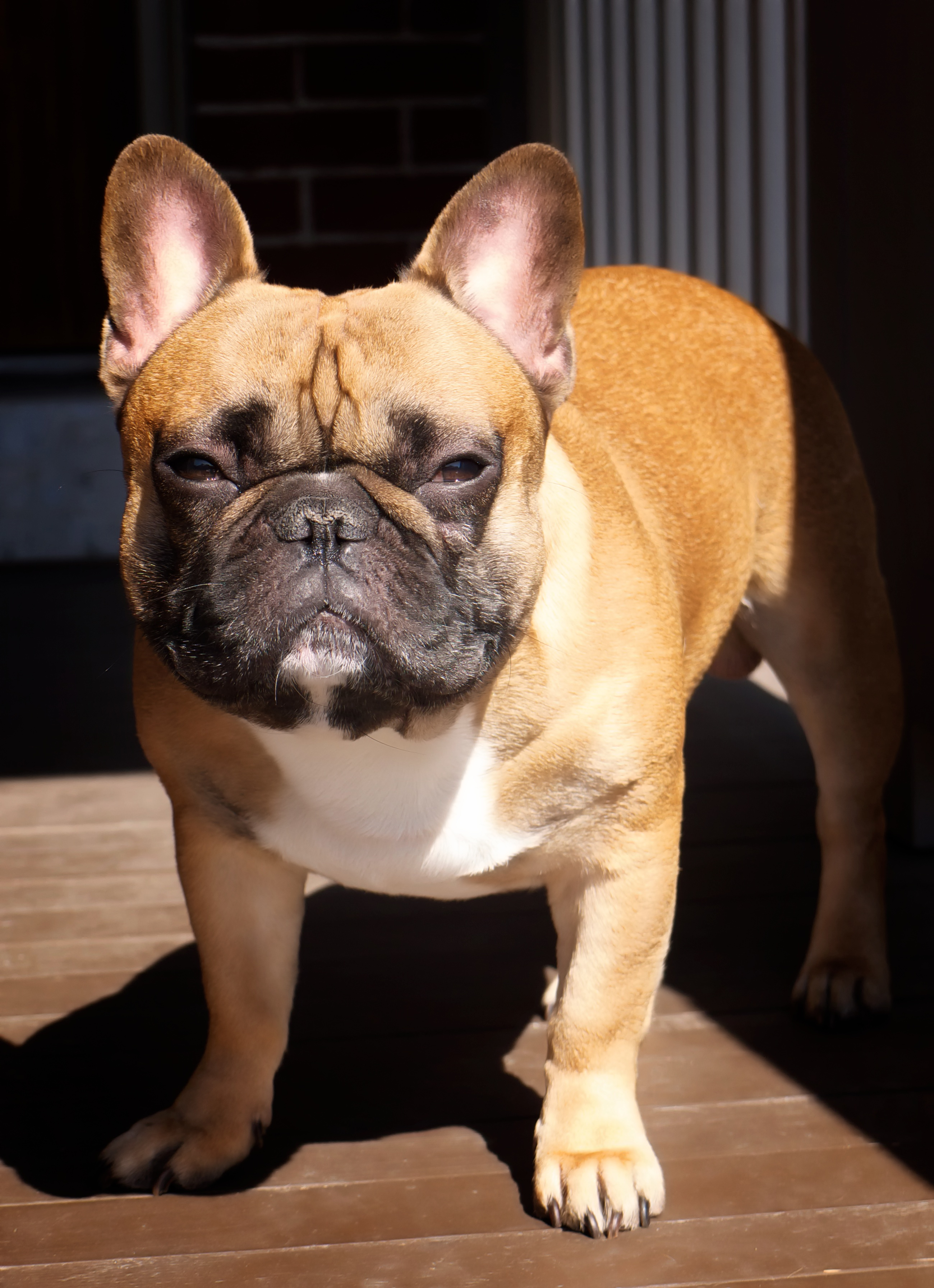
Fawn

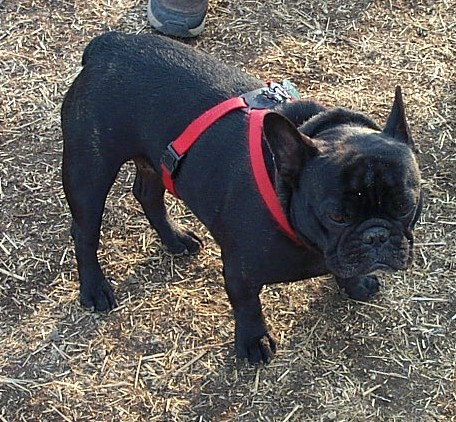
Black

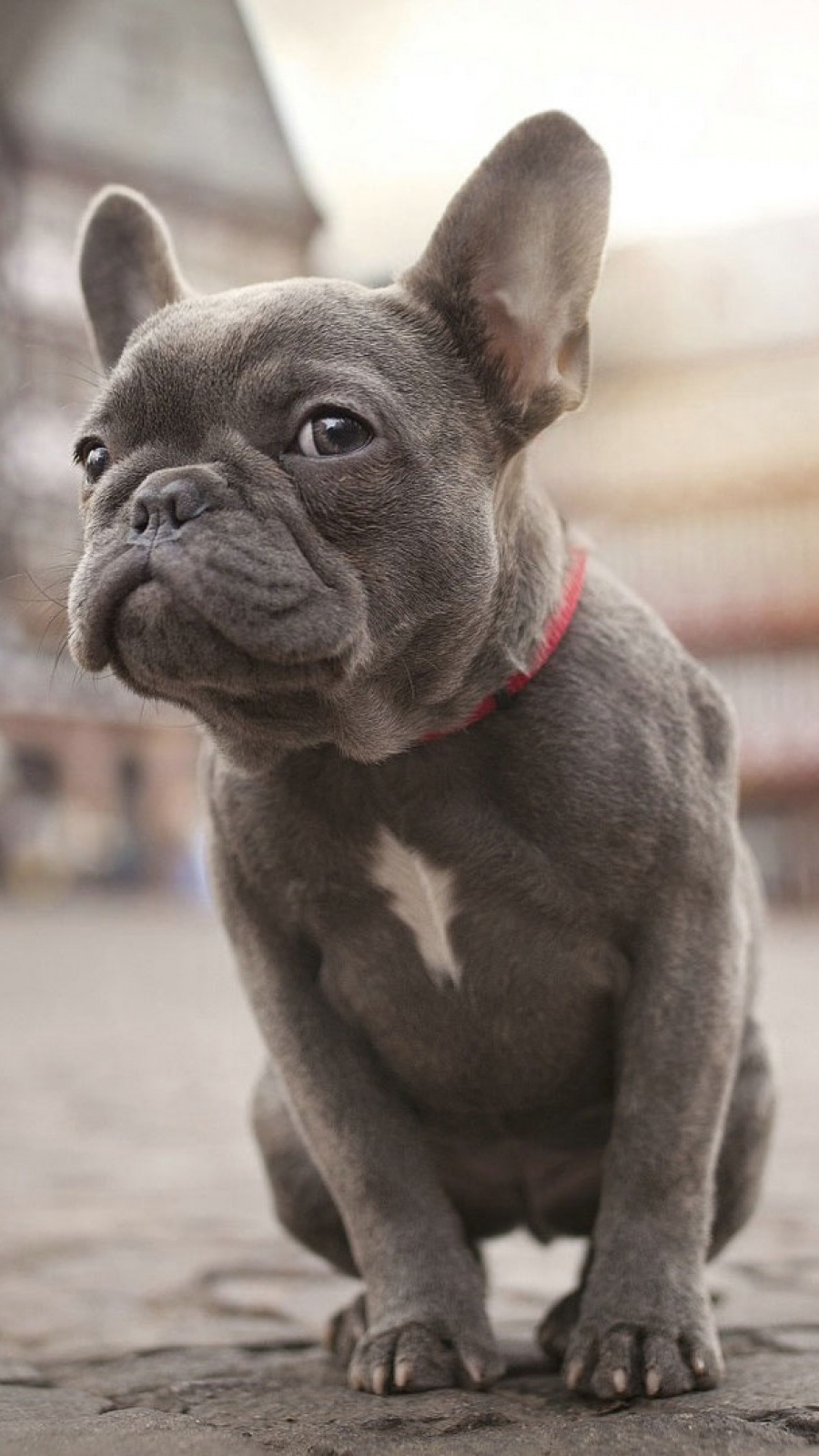
Blue

== Health ==
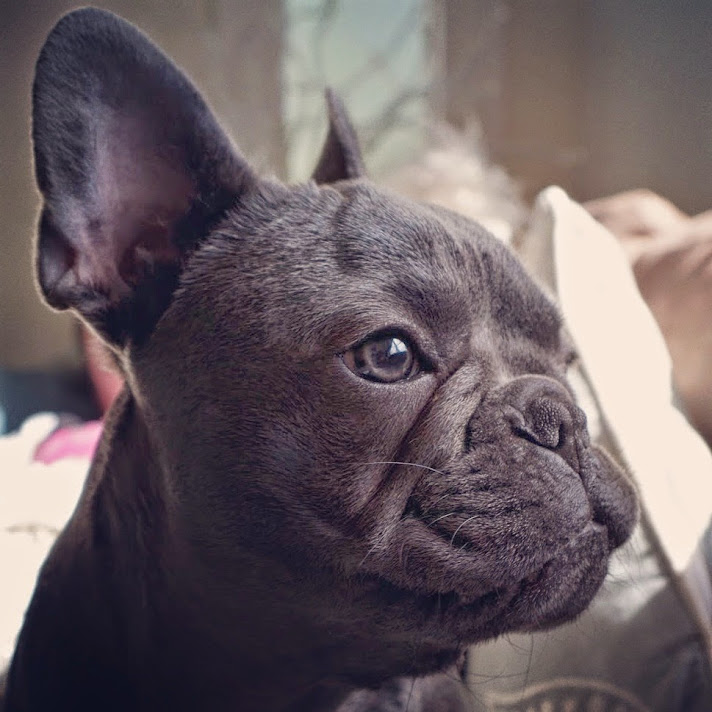
Closeup of the French Bulldog's brachycephalic face

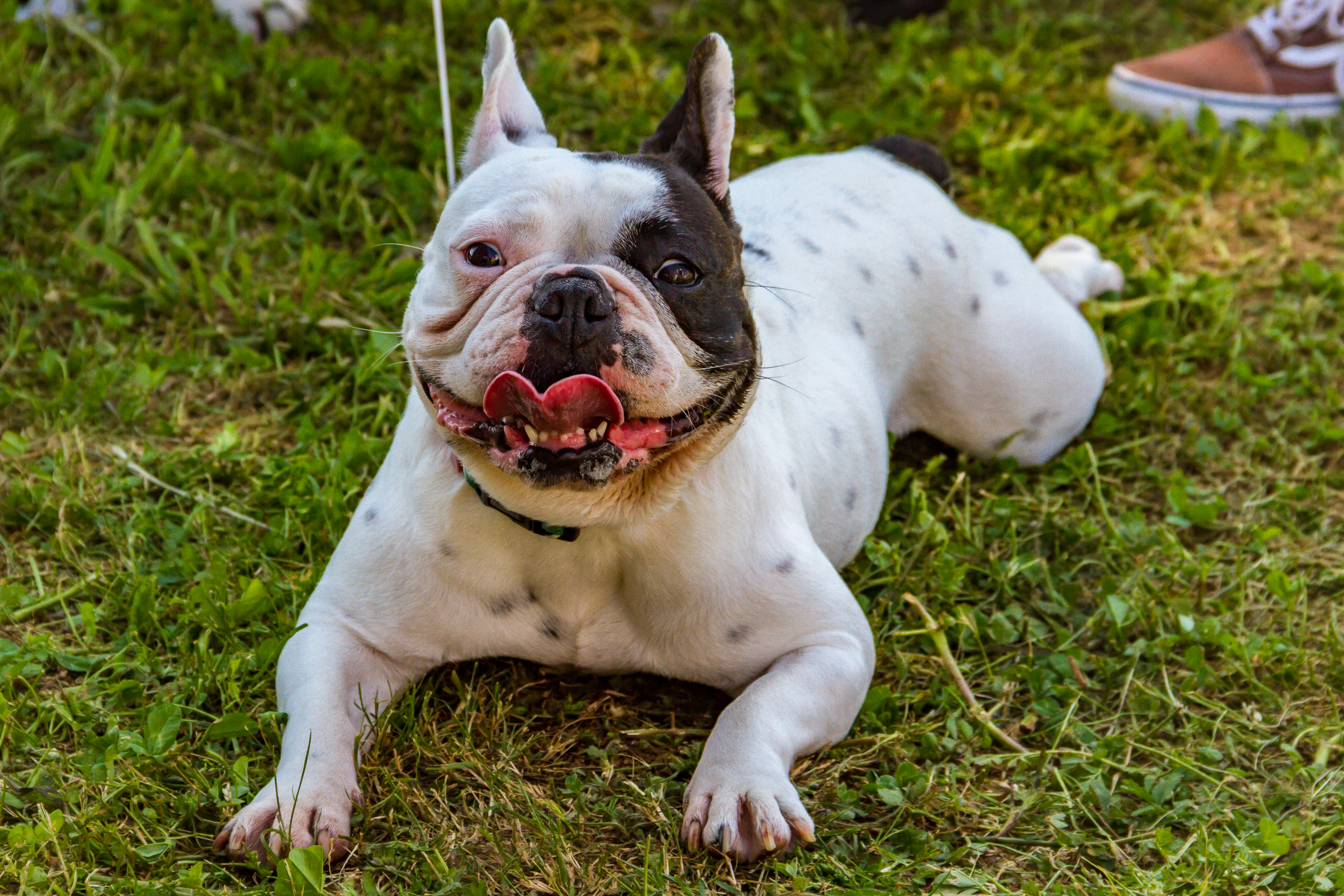
French Bulldog at rest, panting

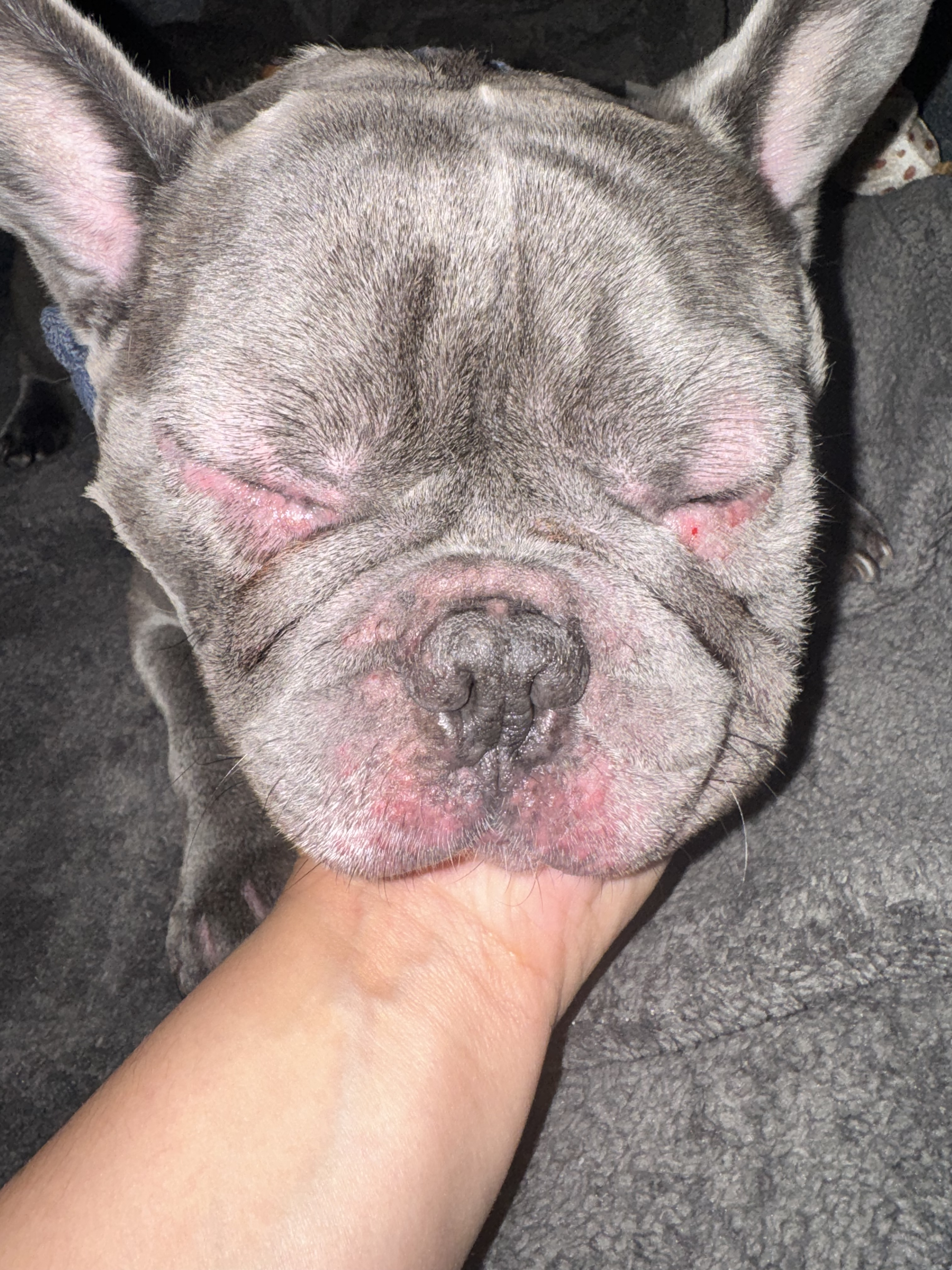
A close up of a KCS (Keratoconjunctivitus Sicca/Dry Eye) flareup in a blue french bulldog.

A study in the UK comparing French Bulldogs to the general canine population found that of 43 common conditions, the French Bulldog had significantly higher prevalence for almost half (20/43) and a significantly lower prevalence for a quarter (11/43). Stenotic nares had an occurrence rate of 42 times the general population, brachycephalic obstructive airway syndrome was 30 times more prevalent, aural discharge was 14 times more prevalent, skin fold dermatitis was 11 times more prevalent, and dystocia was 9 times more prevalent.

In 2013, a UK medical study reviewed the health of 2,228 French Bulldogs under veterinary care in the UK. The study found that 1612 (72.4%) of these French Bulldog had at least one recorded health issue: The most common disorders recorded were ear infections (14.0%), diarrhea (7.5%) and conjunctivitis (3.2%). Skin problems were the most commonly reported group of disorders (17.9%).

Despite these challenges, the popularity of French Bulldogs continues to rise, emphasizing the importance of addressing their health issues.

=== Brachycephaly ===
The shortened snout and pushed in face of the French Bulldog is known as brachycephaly. Brachycephaly results in deformation of the upper airway tract and leads to obstruction of breathing. Effects of brachycephaly are stridor, stertorous breathing, emesis, skin fold dermatitis, brachycephalic airway obstructive syndrome, exophthalmos, pharyngeal gag reflex, cyanosis, and laryngeal collapse. Other issues arising from brachycephaly are risk of complications whilst under anaesthesia, and hyperthermia — with the latter caused due to an inability to effectively reduce body temperature via panting. French Bulldogs are banned by several commercial airlines due to the numbers that have died while in the air.

=== Life expectancy ===
A study of the deaths of 30,563 dogs of different breeds in the United Kingdom in 2016–2020 found the French Bulldog to have a life expectancy at birth of 4.53 years, the lowest by a large margin of all breeds in the study, which found an average for all dogs of 11.23 years. This same study indicates that the low life expectancy for French Bulldogs is possibly influenced by the increasing number of French Bulldogs present in the UK, increasing from 2,771 KC registered individuals in 2011 to 39,266 individuals in 2020, skewing the general population to be very young on average and biasing the data. A Japanese study of pet cemetery data found the French Bulldog to have a life expectancy of 10.2 years, the lowest of all breeds in the study. (Note: The Japanese study reviewed cemetery data which is unlikely to have any records of still-births and altricial deaths whilst a veterinary clinic likely would have some data on these.) A 2024 UK study found a life expectancy of 9.8 years for the breed compared to an average of 12.7 for purebreeds and 12 for crossbreeds.

=== Birth and reproduction ===
French Bulldogs frequently require Caesarean section to give birth, with over 80% of litters delivered this way.

A UK study identified French Bulldog bitches to be 15.9 times more likely to experience dystocia.

=== Orthopaedics ===
French Bulldogs are prone to having congenital hemivertebrae (also called "butterfly vertebrae").

A review of more than 200,000 patients in the UK found that French Bulldogs had a noticeably higher occurrence of patellar luxation with the French Bulldog having an odds ratio of 5.4.

=== Other conditions ===
A French study found that 45% of French Bulldogs presenting with a neurological condition had Hansen type I intervertebral disk herniation, with the study concluding that the French Bulldog is prone to the condition.

A UK study found the French Bulldog to be more likely to suffer from thoracic vertebral malformations than other breeds.

A British study found demodicosis to be more prevalent in the French Bulldog than other breeds. The overall prevalence in French Bulldogs was 1.3% compared to the overall rate of 0.17%. The prevalence in dogs under the age of 2 years was 1.9% compared to 0.48%.

The French Bulldog is one of the most commonly affected breeds for hereditary cataracts.

The French Bulldog is also prone to skin allergies (in addition to the demodicosis called out above) that often result in excessive licking of the paws, watery eyes, ear infections, sneezing, or vomiting.

== Other sources ==
- Lynch, Don (1992). Titanic: An illustrated history. New York, NY: Hyperion. ISBN 978-1-56282-918-6.
- French Bulldog (Report). Breed standards. London, UK: The Kennel Club – via thekennelclub.org.uk.
