= Bolonka =

Russian Tsvetnaya Bolonka
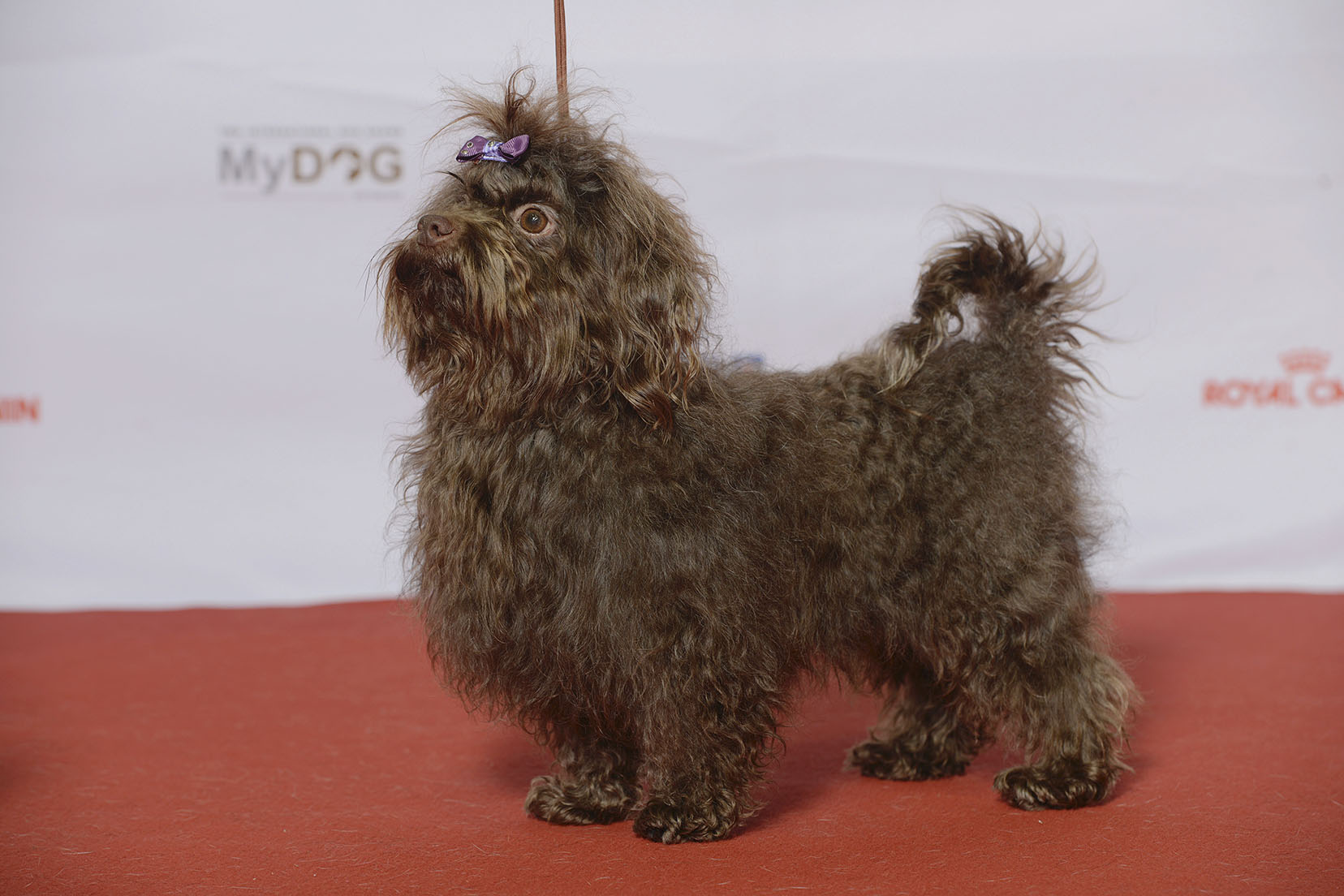
- Russian Tsvetnaya Bolonka
- Other names: Bolonka Zwetna, Franzuskaya Bolonka, Russian Lapdog
- Origin: Russia
Traits
Height	Males	22–27 centimetres (8.7–10.6 in)
	Females	18–24 centimetres (7.1–9.4 in)
Weight	Males	3.5–5 kilograms (7.7–11.0 lb)
	Females	2–4 kilograms (4.4–8.8 lb)
- Coat: Curly or wavy
- Color: Black, Brown, Gray, Red, Wolf-Gray (Tsvetnaya/Zwetna); White (Franzuskaya)
- Litter size: 1–3

The Russian Tsvetnaya Bolonka (Russian: русская цветная болонка), also known as the Bolonka Zwetna in Germany, or known simply as a Bolonka is a rare toy breed of the Bichon type, developed in Moscow and Saint Petersburg, Russia, from the ancestors of smaller dogs such as the Bichon Frise, Toy Poodle, Shih Tzu, Pekingese and French Bolognese. They include the white variety, the Franzuskaya Bolonka. The name of the breed means French lap dog (franzuskaja = French, Bolonka = lap dog, French Bichon).

== Etymology ==
"Tsvetnaya Bolonka" is translated as "Russian Colored Lapdog". The Russian Tsvetnaya Bolonka has several different nicknames. In Germany, the dogs have been known as Bolonka Zwetna or Deutscher Bolonka since the 1980s. The Tsvetnaya and the Zwetna have the same bloodlines; however, the Nordic Kennel Union officially recognizes the Russkaya Tsvetnaya and not the Zwetna. In the Czech Republic, the breed is called the Barevny Bolonsky Psik (Bolognais color). Sometimes they are mistakenly called Bolognese. The common name of the breed in all countries is Bolonka (plural: Bolonki). The Franzuskaya (French) Bolonka is the white variety.

== History ==
The Russian Tsvetnaya Bolonka had its beginnings as far back as the early 18th century. Louis XIV of France presented Russian Tsvetnaya Bolonki as gifts to the Russian nobility. Later, the ancestors of the Russian Tsvetnaya Bolonka migrated to Russia with Napoleon’s army and they were known as the French Bolonka. Russia was never known for its toy breeds, partly because of its environment and its economic need for working dogs. Smaller breeds were considered superfluous and unnecessary, even more so during the Soviet Regime. During this time, dogs were not imported to Russia, so breeds were developed by selections from existing breeds. Being unable to import dogs from outside of Russia, the Russian Tsvetnaya Bolonka was developed by localized breeding through dog lovers in Moscow and Leningrad, who looked to the ancestors of smaller dogs such as the Bichon Frise, Toy Poodle, Shih Tzu, Pekingese and French Bolognese, with a view to creating a toy-sized lap dog that would have the right temperament for apartment living. Since 1966, they have been called the Russian Tsvetnaya Bolonka. Interest in the specific breed of Russian Tsvetnaya Bolonka revived after the fall of the Iron Curtain.

Similarly, through the connection between the Russian and French aristocracy in the 18th and 19th centuries, a dog similar to the Bichon Frise or Bolognese of today was brought to Tsarist Russia. These little white dogs were favorites of the fashionable ladies of the period in both countries. After the Russian Revolution, the Russian dogs were isolated from the French dogs. The little dogs began to be taken seriously as a native Russian breed in the 1950s, and grew in popularity. Export of the dogs was strictly regulated. In 1978, a breeding pair of Franzuskaya Bolonka was sent as a diplomatic gift from the Soviet Union into the GDR. From these and a few others, the white Franzuskaya Bolonka began to be developed as a breed in Germany in the 1980s. Eventually it was recognized by the VDF (Verband für das Deutsche Hundewesen) as a variation of the Italian Bolognese. This was at the same time as the coloured variety was being developed, the Russian Tsvetnaya Bolonka (bunte Schoßhündchen, Bolonka Zwetnaya, Deutscher Bolonka). These dogs are not yet recognized, although they have active breed clubs in several countries.

== Appearance ==
Russian Tsvetnaya Bolonki are 18 – 27 cm high at the withers and 2-4 or 5 kg in weight. The Russian Tsvetnaya Bolonka body formation resembles a square, with a long coat that has big wavy curls. The Russian Tsvetnaya Bolonka is moderately boned and should never appear fine-boned. The Franzuskaya Bolonka is white, while the Tsvetnaya Bolonka and Zwetna Bolonka are black, brown, gray, red or wolf-gray. The breed is known for its soft, wavy to curly coat in a variety of colors. They have ears that are neither too long nor too short. Male Russian Tsvetnaya Bolonki have a distinct beard and moustache that sets them apart from their female counterparts. Russian Tsvetnaya Bolonki tails are supposed to have the tip touching the back. Similar to other Bichon breeds, Russian Tsvetnaya Bolonki do not shed. Daily brushing of the coat helps to prevent matting. If a Russian Tsvetnaya Bolonka's coat gets severely matted, it may develop a hematoma. Russian Tsvetnaya Bolonki are considered suitable for people with allergies, as they are bred to be hypoallergenic. Breeds that do not shed are more likely to be hypoallergenic, since the dog's dander and saliva stick to the hair and are not released into the environment. The frequent trimming, brushing, and bathing required to keep the Russian Tsvetnaya Bolonka looking its best removes hair and dander and controls saliva. How hypoallergenic a particular dog is for a particular person may vary with the individual dog and the individual person.

== Temperament ==
The Russian Tsvetnaya Bolonka is even-tempered, very intelligent, friendly to all, and should never be shy or show aggression in any way. The Russian Tszvetnaya Bolonka was specifically developed as a companion dog and is prized for its sociable, easy-going and affectionate temperament. Its specimens will avoid exuberant games and will not appreciate any extent of physical abuse during playing. The Russian Tsvetnaya Bolonka usually perceives all unfamiliar people as potential playmates and without timely socialization, it can grow into an inappropriate greeter. However, this breed was bred with strong tendency to defend its territory and its favorite humans, so it can become a fairly good watchdog. The Russian Tsvetnaya Bolonka will not be able to apply to necessary aggression when the situation calls for it, and should not be tasked with the responsibilities of a guardian.

== Recognition ==
Russian Tsvetnaya Bolonki are popular in Germany. The white version, the Bolonka Franzuska, was recognised by the VDH (German national kennel club) as a variation of the Bolognese. The fact that Russian Tsvetnaya Bolonki are not recognized stems from the lack of a national kennel club in Russia, after the fall of Communism. Without an active national club, the Fédération Cynologique Internationale will not recognize the Russian dogs; in addition, there have been reports of irregularities in record keeping since in present-day Russia. In January 2013, the Nordic Kennel Union officially accepted the Russkaya Twvetnaya Bolonka and not the Bolonka Zwetna, and since then it has been allowed to participate in dog shows in the NKU member countries: Denmark, Norway, Sweden and Finland. The American Kennel Club (AKC) added the Russian Tsvetnaya Bolonka to the Foundation Stock Service Program in 2015 and assigned the breed to the Toy Group; in 2026 the AKC fully recognized the breed. Russian Tsvetnaya Bolonki are considered the rarest of the Bichon type.

== Gallery ==
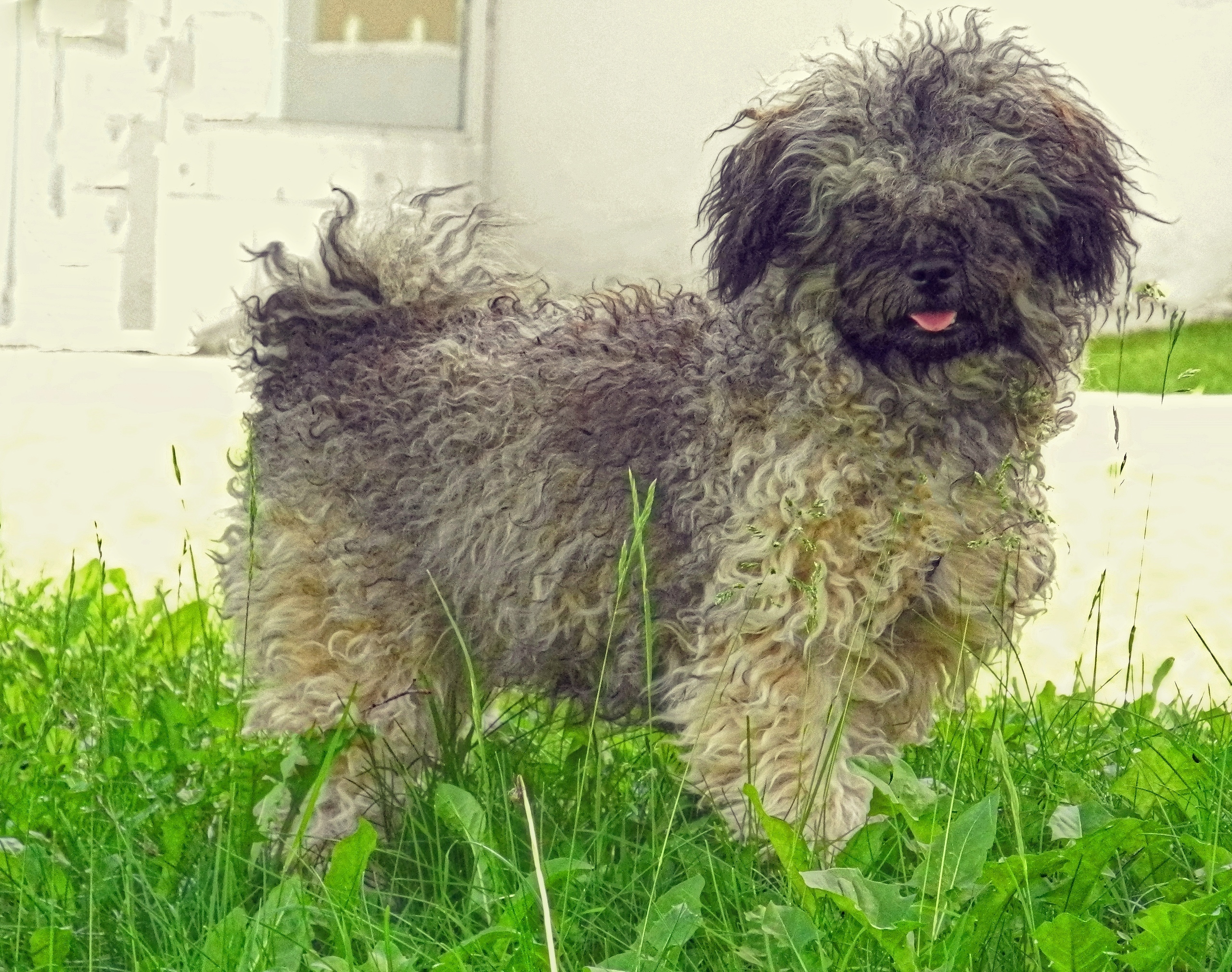
A wolf-gray Russian Tsvetnaya Bolonka

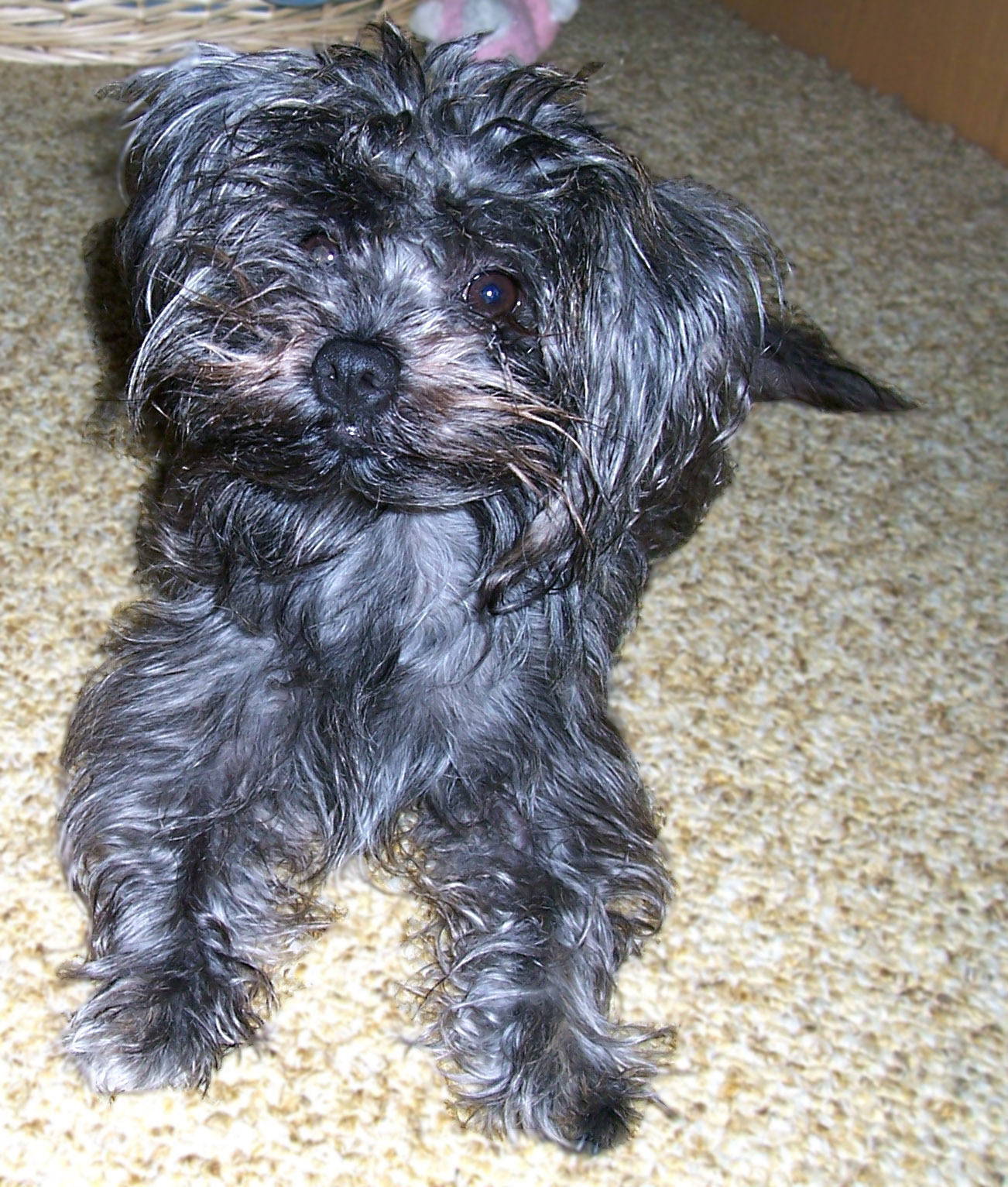

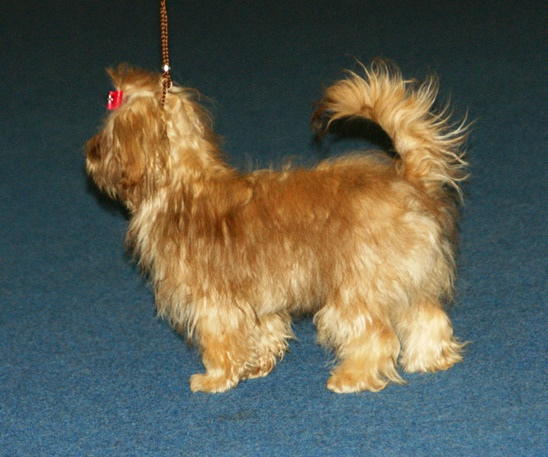
A red Russian Tsvetnaya Bolonka female

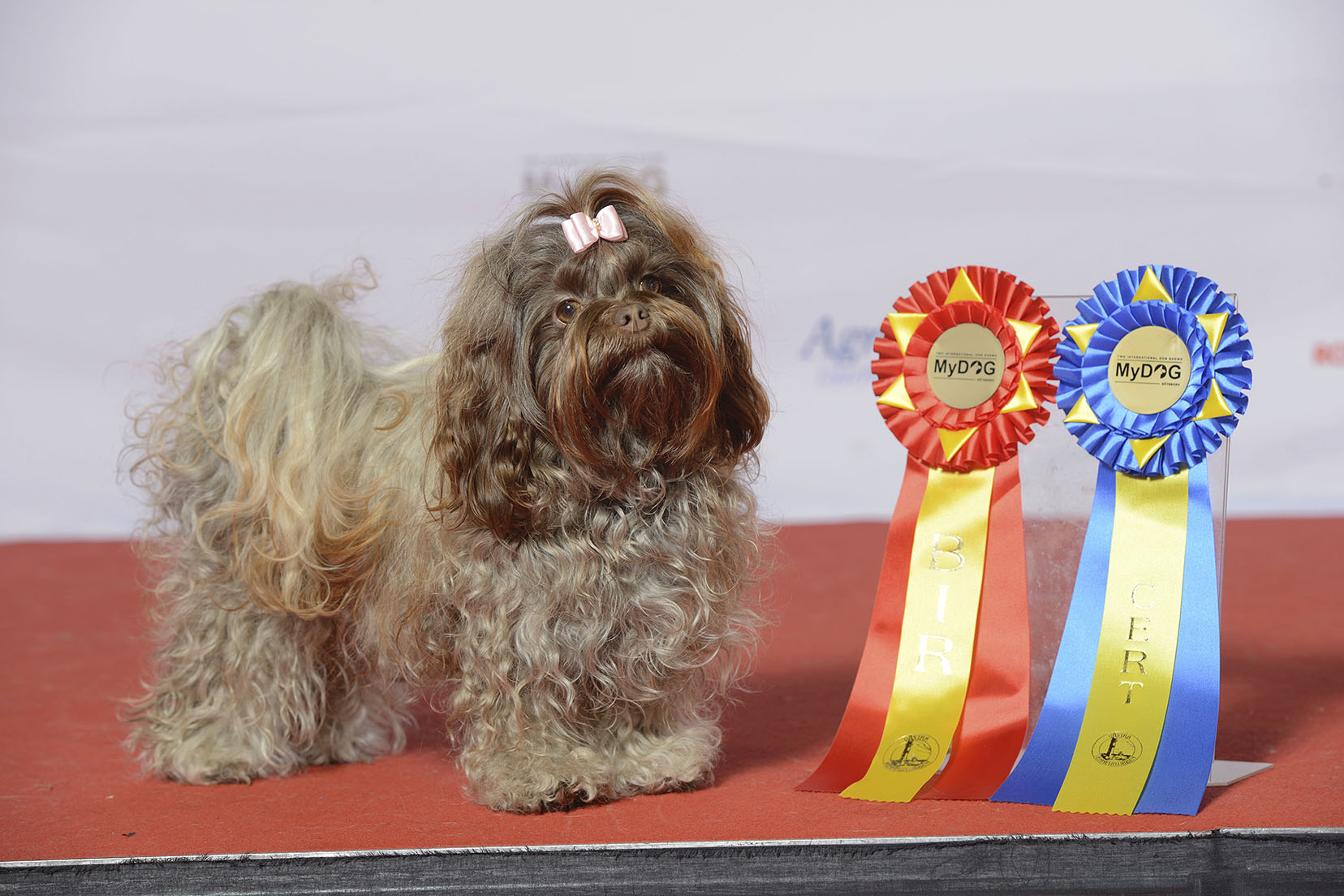

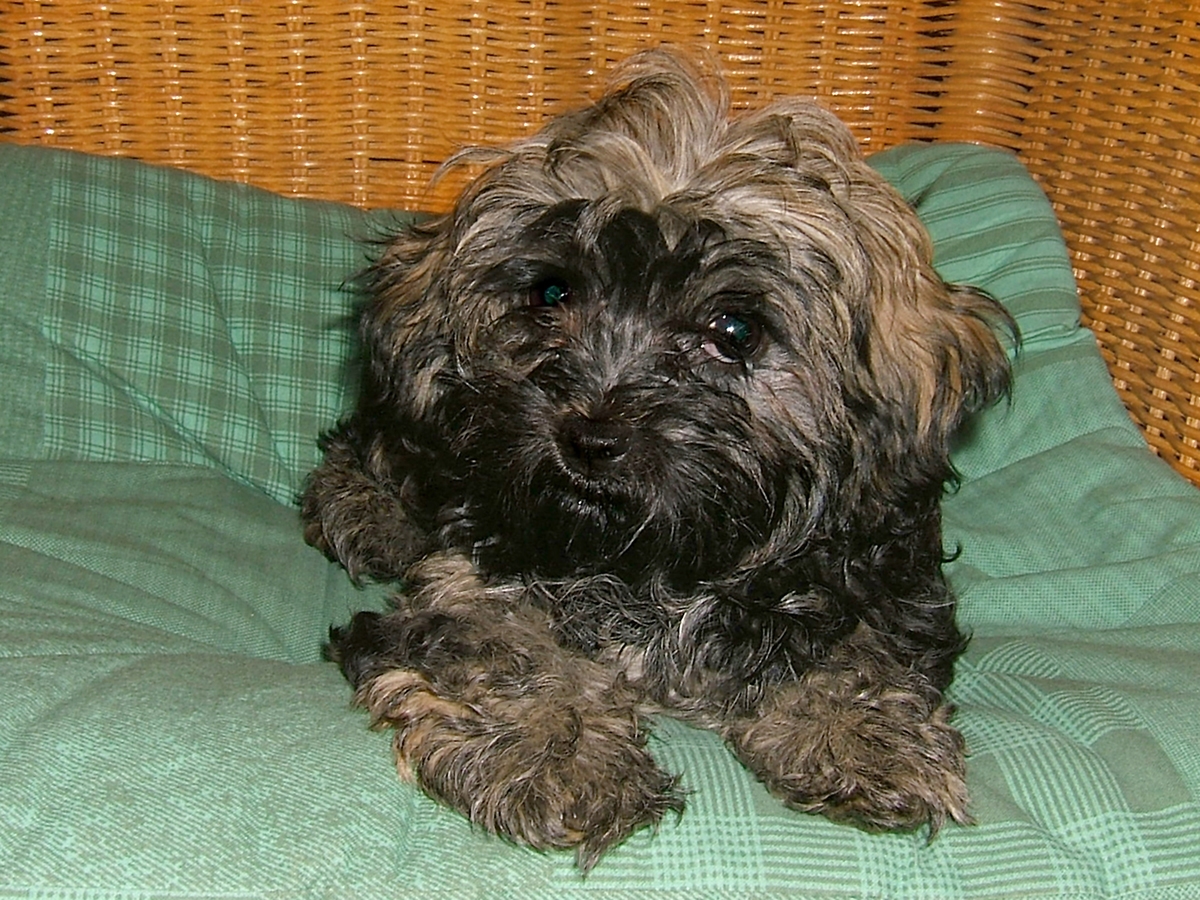
A 14-week old Bolonka

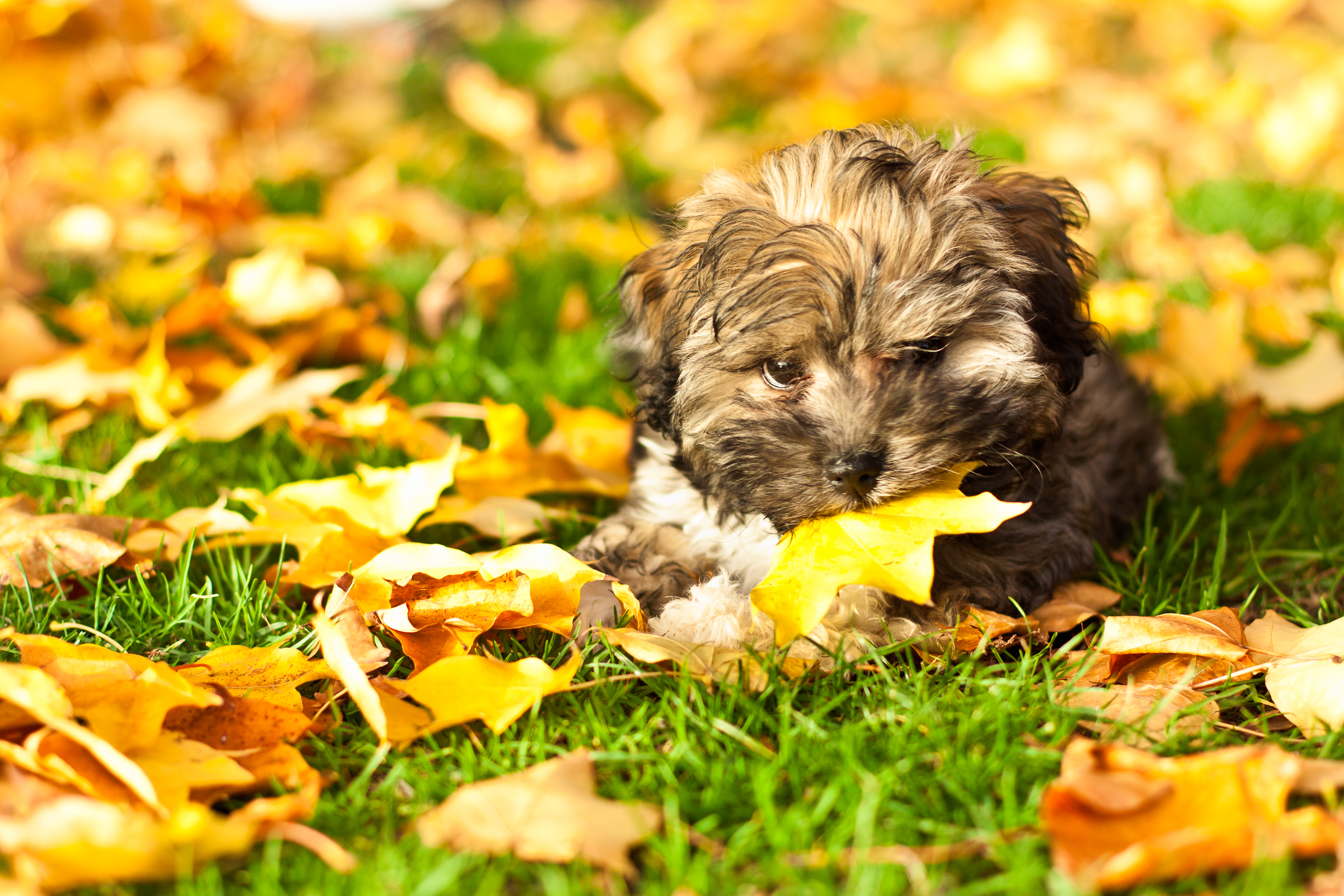
Bolonka Zwetna

== See also ==
- Bichon
- Lap dog
- Toy dog
- Russian Toy
- Bolognese dog
