= Bolognese (dog breed) =

Italian breed of dog

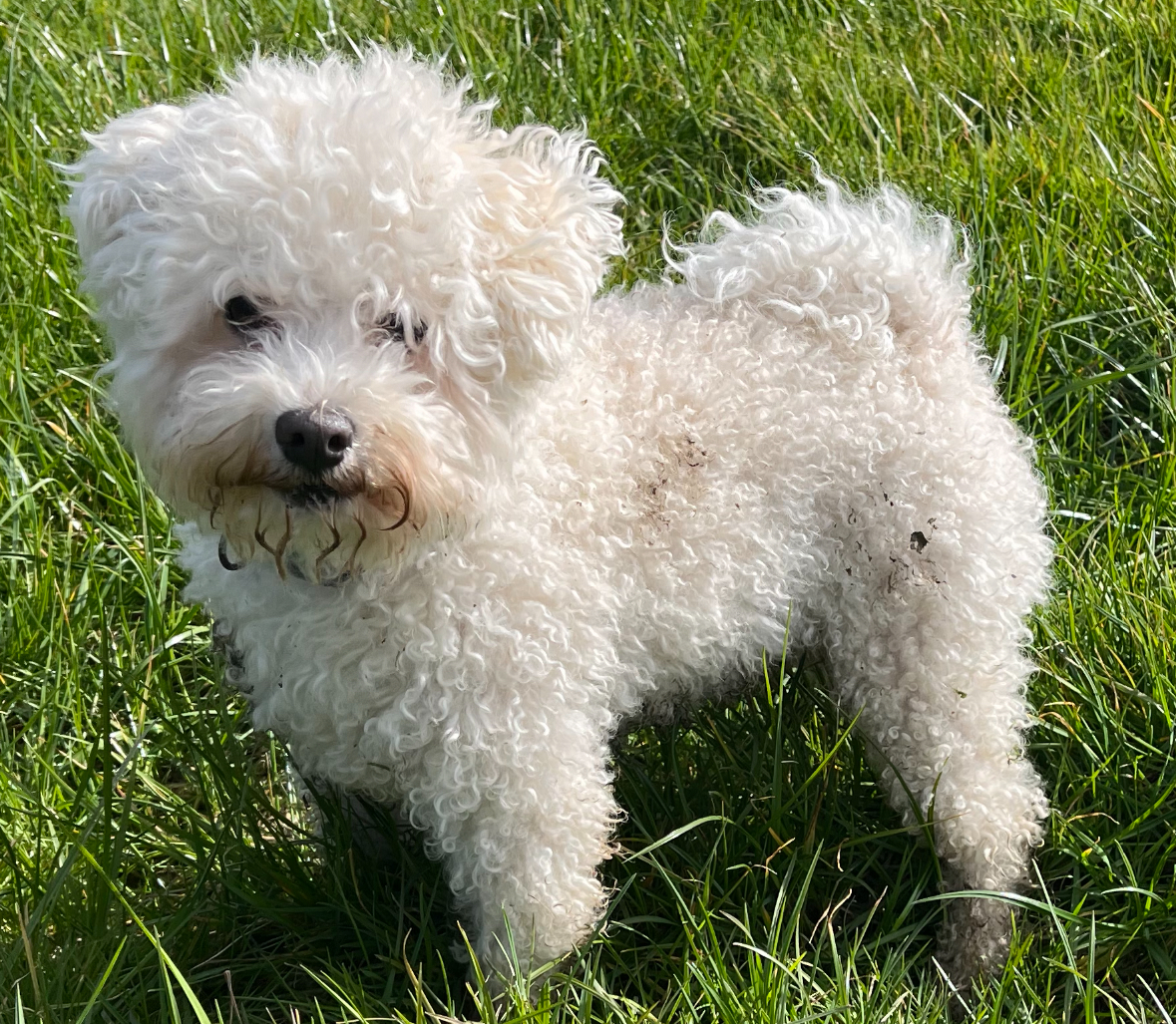
- Ordinary coat
- Other names: Bichon Bolognese; Bolognese Toy Dog; Bolo; Botoli; Bottolo
- Origin: Italy
Traits
Height	Males	27–30 cm (11–12 in)
	Females	25–28 cm (10–11 in)
- Weight: 2.5–4 kg (6–9 lb)
- Coat: long and fluffy
- Colour: white
Kennel club standards
- Ente Nazionale della Cinofilia Italiana: standard
- Fédération Cynologique Internationale: standard

The Bolognese (Note: pronounced [boloɲˈɲeːze]) is an Italian breed of small dog of Bichon type. It falls in the toy dog group and is commonly kept as a companion dog. The name derives from that of the city of Bologna, in Emilia-Romagna.

== History ==
The Bolognese belongs to the Bichon group of breeds, which also includes the Bichon Frisé, the Maltese, the Löwchen, the Havanese and the Coton de Tuléar.

The origins and ancestry of the Bolognese are unknown.

Similar dogs may be seen in tapestry work produced by Flemish craftsmen dating as far back as the seventeenth century. The Venetian painter Titian painted the Duke Federico Gonzaga with such a dog. Others are seen in paintings by Goya, Gosse and Watteau. Among those who owned dogs of this type are Catherine the Great of Russia, Madame de Pompadour and Empress Maria Theresa of Austria.

The Bolognese was brought into England in 1990 by Liz Stannard and was first shown during that year. In 2001 the breed was able to be shown at all shows with their own classes. They were at Crufts for the first time in 2002.

== Characteristics ==
Bolognese dogs are on average 12-14 inches tall. They weigh between 6-10 pounds and they have a life expectancy of 12-14 years. The coat is either pure white or pale ivory in various shades. The distinctive single coat (i.e., no undercoat) falls in loose open ringlets/flocks all over the body, with shorter hair on the face. The texture is woolly, as opposed to silky, and is never trimmed or clipped unless kept as pets.

Bolognese dogs are 'non-shedding,' so low to mild allergies can be expected.

== Health ==
A study in the United Kingdom in 2024 found a median longevity of 14.9 years for the breed with a sample size of 32, compared to an average of about 12.5 for all dogs.

== Gallery ==
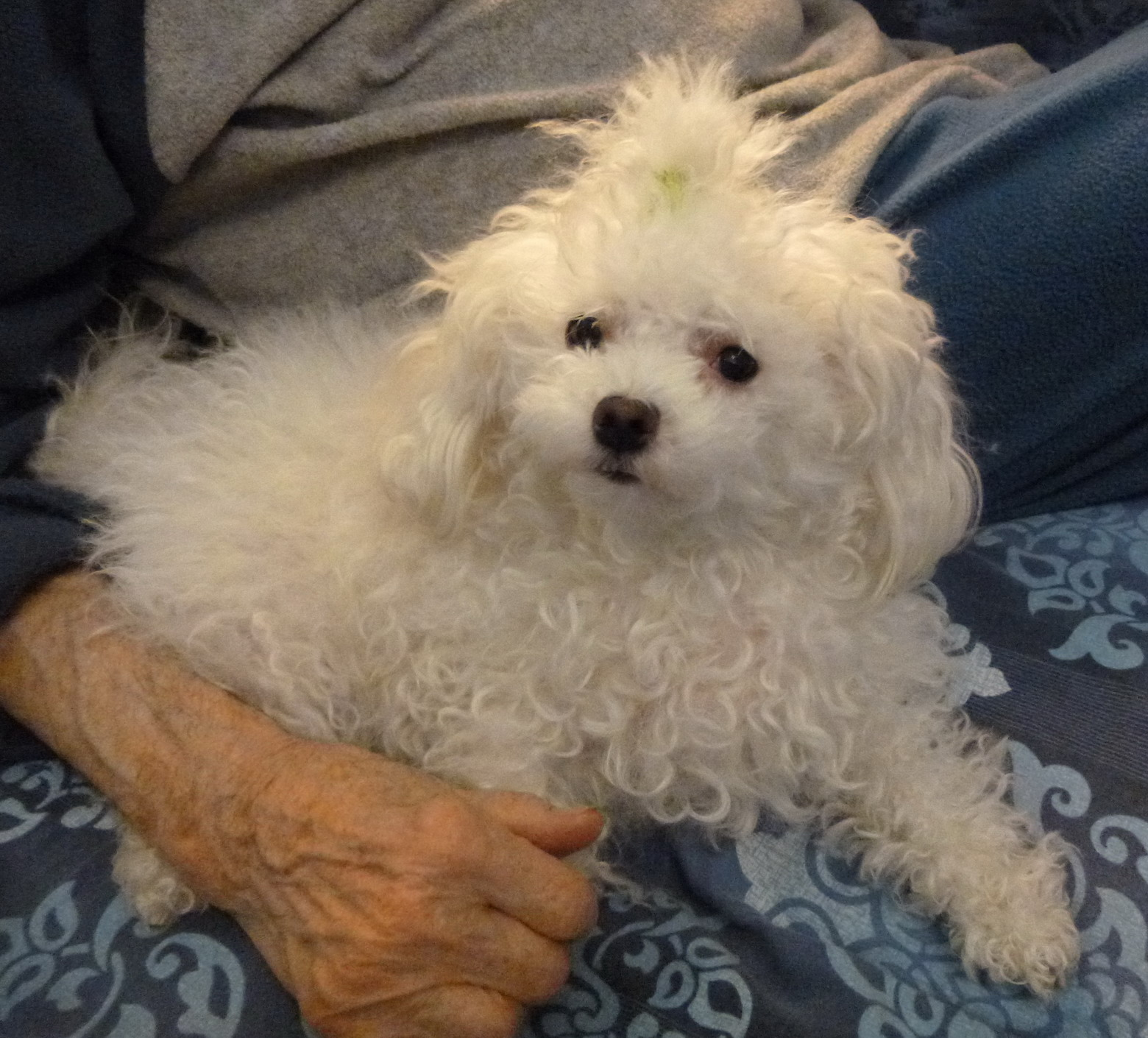

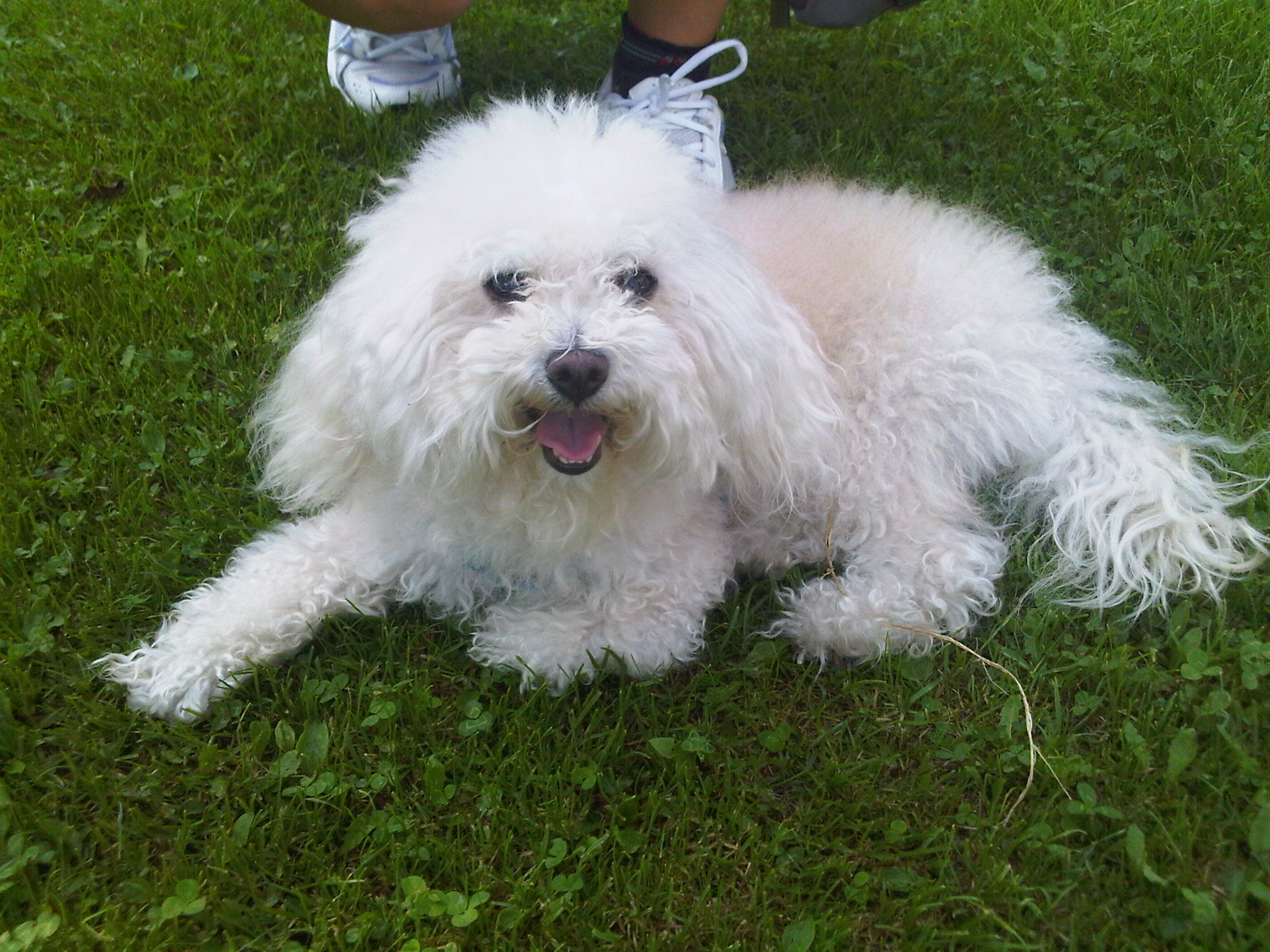

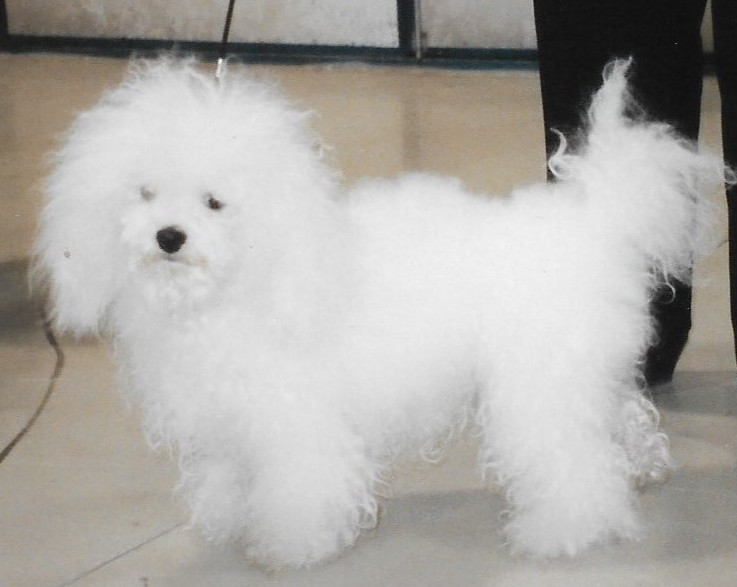
Show-cut coat
