= Coton de Tulear =

Coton de Tuléar
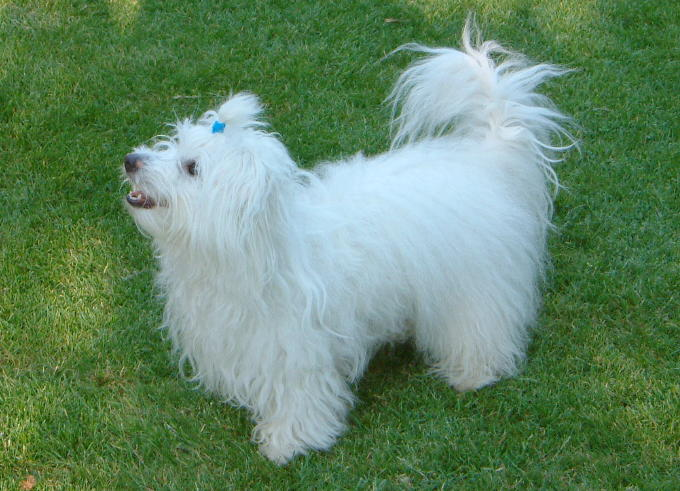
- A Coton de Tuléar Puppy
- Common nicknames: Coton
- Origin: Madagascar
Traits
Height	Males	25–30 cm (9.8–11.8 in)
	Females	22–27 cm (8.7–10.6 in)
Weight	Males	4–6 kg (8.8–13.2 lb)
	Females	3.5–5 kg (7.7–11.0 lb)
- Coat: medium-to-long, fluffy, cotton-like coat
- Color: white; white and grey, tan, black, or tricolor
Kennel club standards
- Fédération Cynologique Internationale: standard

The Coton de Tuléar is a breed of small dog named for the city of Tuléar (also known as Toliara) in Madagascar. This breed is thought to have originated from a group of small white dogs that swam across the Malagasy channel following a shipwreck. Known for its cotton-like coat, the Coton de Tuléar typically grows to no more than 8.2 kg (18 lb), and is white, sometimes with grey, tan, black, or tri-colored markings.

== Description ==
=== Appearance ===
Multiple registries with differing standards describe the Coton de Tuléar, but it generally has very soft voluptuous hair (as opposed to fur), comparable to a cotton ball (hence its name in French, coton meaning cotton), a prominent black nose, large expressive eyes (usually covered by bangs), and somewhat short legs. The Coton de Tuléar's tail should curl over its back.

=== Coat and color ===
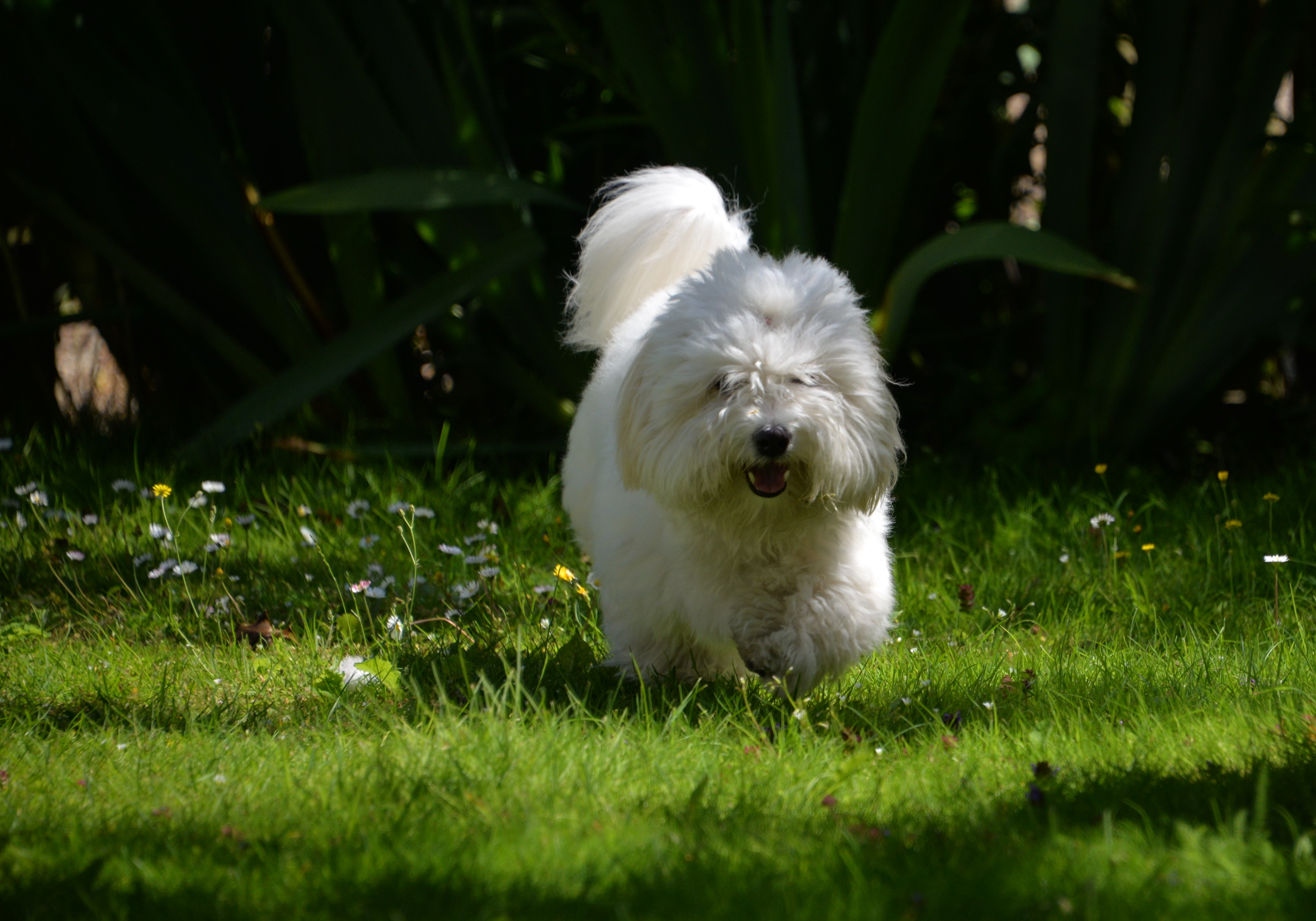
One year old Coton de Tulear playing in the garden

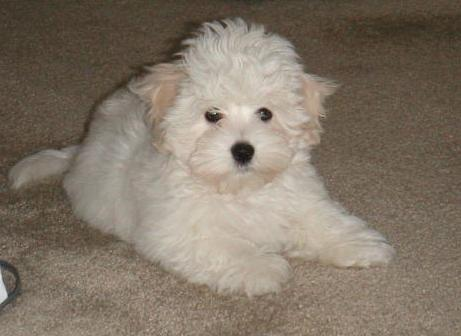
A Coton puppy

The Coton de Tuléar has a medium-to-long, fluffy, cotton-like coat that is considered hair rather than fur. It is a non-shedding breed with low dander and is considered hypoallergenic. When it is a puppy, it may shed its puppy coat. Like the poodles, Maltese or the Havanese, this breed has very low allergic effects. Matted hair is common for this breed and should be removed through daily brushing and combing. Grooming the Coton de Tuléar can be quite a challenge.

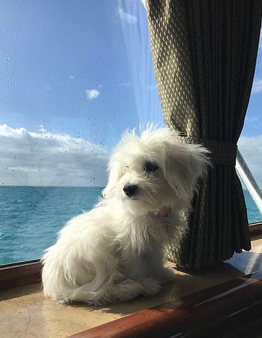
The Coton's soft hair is comparable to a cotton ball.

The Coton de Tuléar comes in three accepted colors: white (sometimes with tan markings; all white is preferred by show breeders); black and white; and tricolor. However, the tan and white may become all white, the blacks will often fade to grey or white, and fur will most likely change throughout puppyhood. The breed even has a fade gene that causes the colors, which are very dark when a puppy, to fade and turn white at the base of the hair as it lengthens; that is why the Champagne or Champagne Teddy Bear Coton eventually turns white when the adult hair comes in.) The Fédération Cynologique Internationale standard specifies that the Coton's coat should be white but may also have tan or "lemon" color on their ears and body. The coat, however, must be primarily white with no black hair. The US-based Coton de Tuléar Club of America (CTCA) allows for three different but equally favorable colorings: white, black-and-white, and tri-color, including "honey bear". White is described as nearly all white, sometimes with tan or champagne coloring on the ears, face, or back. Black-and-white is defined as pure white with prominent black patches on the head and body (no white-to-black ratio is specified or favored). Tri-color is described as mostly white with some brown markings and dustings of black on the body and head. A honey bear tri-color has light brown with black tips that gradually fades to an off-white or lemon color. The tri-color loses the most color of any of the color varieties, usually becoming mostly white with possibly some champagne markings and a dusting of black hairs on the ears and/or body.

=== Size ===
The Fédération Cynologique Internationale standard gives the Coton's weight as 6 to 8 kg (13 to 18 lb) for males and 3.5 to 5 kg (7.7 to 11.0 lb) for females. The Coton's height (including tolerance) is 25 to 30 cm (9.8 to 11.8 in) tall for males and 22 to 27 cm (8.7 to 10.6 in) for females.

The Coton de Tuléar Club of America standard specifies the weight as no more than 18 lb (8.2 kg), with the average being between 11 and 15 lb (5.0 and 6.8 kg). The standard height is 9 to 13 in (23 to 33 cm), except for the rare Tall Coton, which is 15 to 17 in (38 to 43 cm) tall. The long-limbed Tall Coton shows up in all three color varieties and can be born to a litter with normal-sized parents that carry the appropriate genes.

=== Detailed description ===
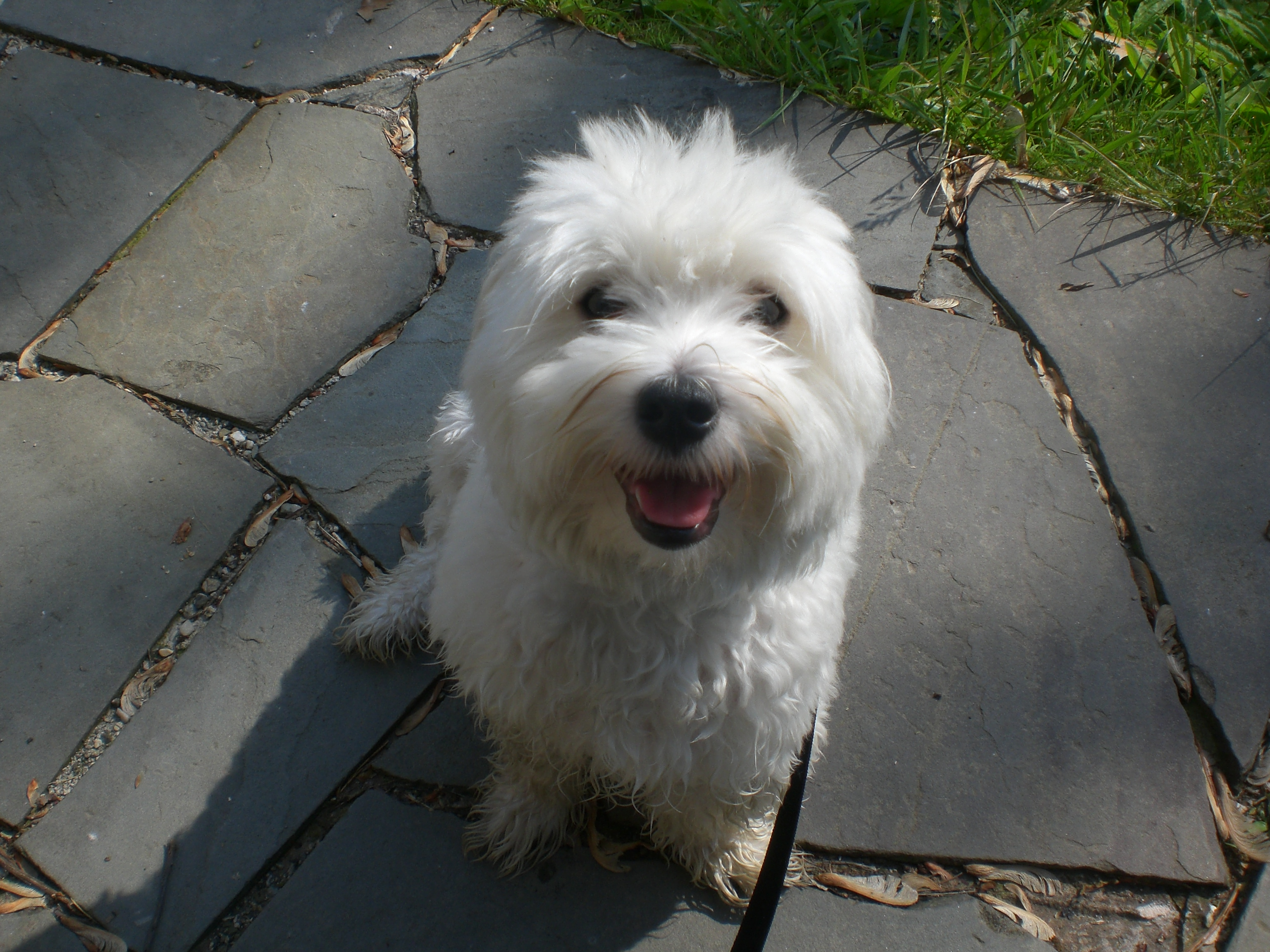
The Coton de Tulear is known for its cheerful, friendly disposition

The nose is black in colour in the Coton de Tuléar Club of America standard. However, the Fédération Cynologique Internationale standard, which also favors a black nose, states that brown is tolerable as well. A pink or partly pink nose is not accepted in either standard. The standard advocates that the lips should preferably be tight and of the same colour as the nose, specifically black in the Coton de Tuléar Club of America standard. A Coton de Tuléar's teeth can be either in a scissor bite or pincer bite. Its eyes are normally round, dark in colour, and wide-set. Traditionally, the expression is lively, intelligent, bright, and merry. Typically, the Coton de Tuléar's ears are triangular and set high. The leather of the ear is often thin, and the neck is strong, favoured to be without a dewlap, and slightly arched.

The chest is typically well developed and reaches to (FCI-Standard N° 283 / 04. 02. 2000 / GB) the elbows. A Coton de Tuléar's feet are small and arched, and its back is normally strong and slightly arched. The pads of the feet are usually black. The body is of moderate length and typically has a moderate tuck-up. Traditionally, the loin is muscular and not overly long. The hind legs are normally strong and straight. The hind feet are similar to the front feet. Throughout history, the dewclaws have been removed; however, many would now oppose this arguably unnecessary and cruel procedure. The tail is traditionally low-set and tapering, carried over the back when in motion or excited, but relaxed otherwise.

== Health ==
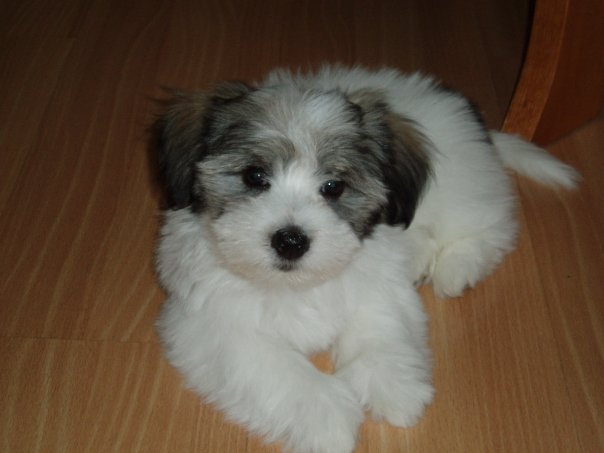
A tricolor Coton puppy

A 2024 UK study found a life expectancy of 14.2 years from a sample size of 44 dogs for the breed compared to an average of 12.7 for purebreeds and 12 for crossbreeds.

The combination of a long back and short legs increases strain during activities like jumping, stairs, or sudden turns.

== History ==
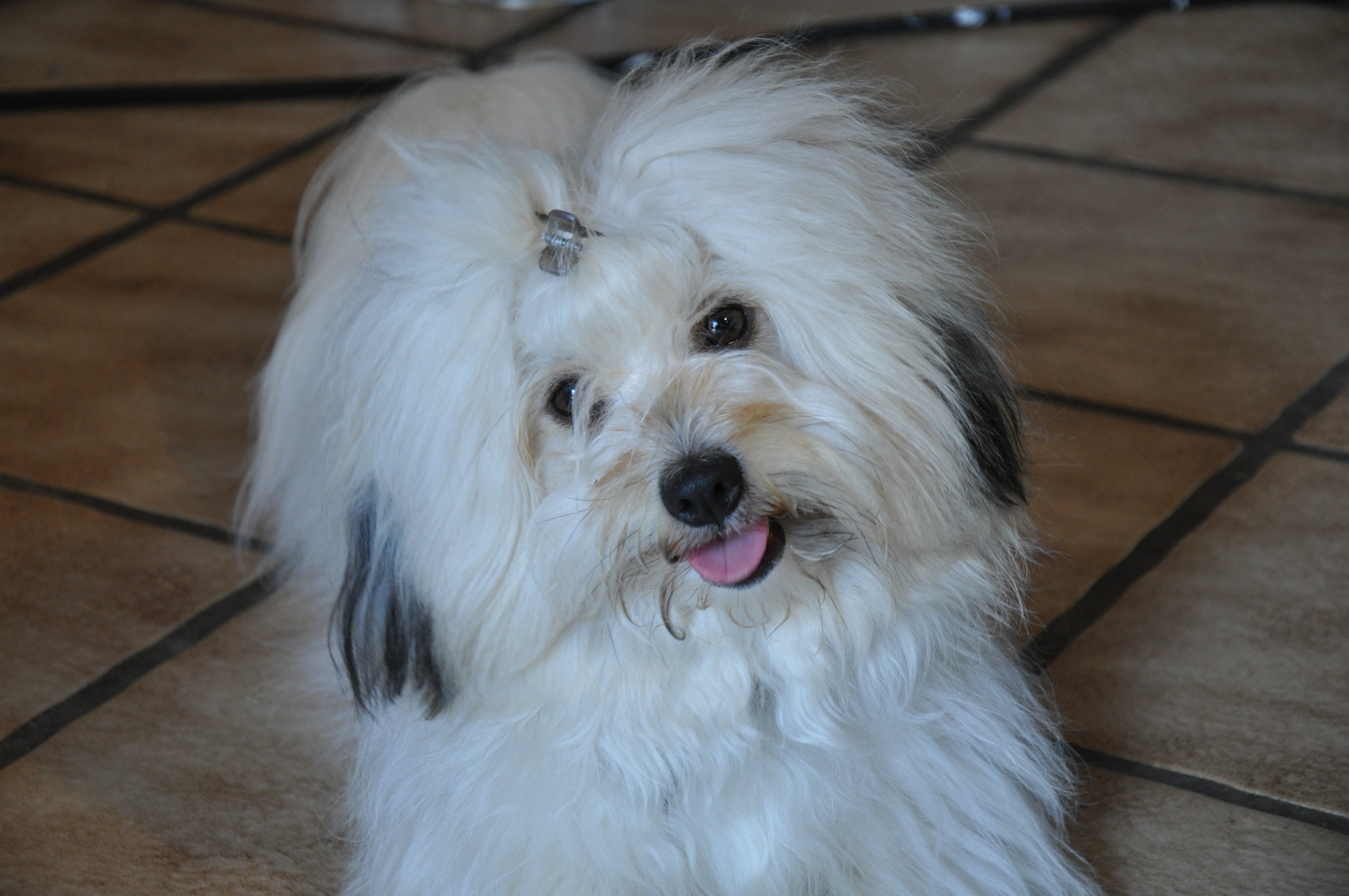
A white Coton with black markings

The Coton de Tuléar developed on the island of Madagascar and is still the island's national dog. It is believed that the Tenerife dog was brought to Madagascar and mated with a dog on the island, creating an unexpected result. The Coton's ancestors were possibly brought to Madagascar in the 16th and 17th centuries aboard pirate ships. Madagascar was a haven for pirates, and pirate graveyards can still be seen there. Pirates established a base on St. Mary's Island, Madagascar and some of them took Malagasy wives. Whether the dogs were brought along to control rats on the ships, as companions for long voyages, or were confiscated from other ships as booty, no one knows. Tuléar is a port now also known as Toliara. The Coton is of the Bichon dog type, linked most closely to the Bichon Tenerife and the Tenerife Terrier. There have been many stories circulating about the history of the Coton in recent years, most of them untrue. The Coton de Tuléar was never feral on Madagascar. It did not hunt wild boar or crocodiles, as its size, strength, and demeanor can disprove easily. It was a companion dog of the Merina (the ruling tribe) in Madagascar. It has a very little prey drive and is not a hunting dog.

The cottony coat may be the result of a single gene mutation. This small, friendly dog caught the fancy of the Malagasy royalty, and they became the only people allowed to keep Cotons. When Dr. Robert Jay Russell encountered the breed in Madagascar in 1973 and brought the first ones to America, he coined the phrase the Royal Dog of Madagascar, and the name stuck. They were also imported occasionally into France by returning French colonists but were not officially imported to Europe until the 1970s. In 1974, Madagascar released a stamp with the image of the Coton, affirming their status as the nation's "royal dog".

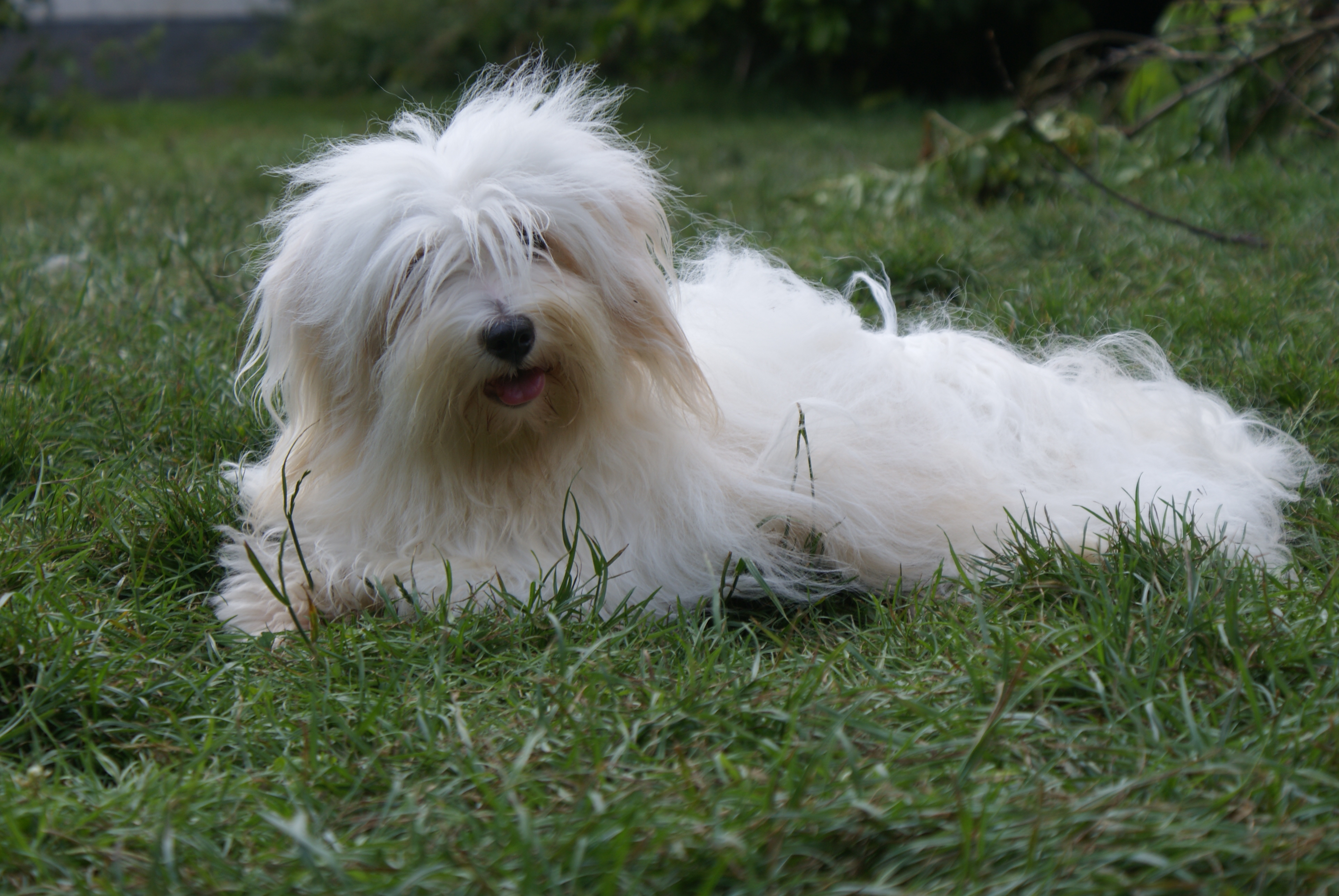
The cottony coat may be the result of a single gene mutation.

The Coton de Tuléar was first formally recognised as a breed by the Societe Centrale Canine (the French national kennel club) in 1970 and was accepted by the Fédération Cynologique Internationale, which published the breed standard in 1972. The Coton de Tuléar is recognised internationally through the Fédération Cynologique Internationale and by major kennel clubs (The Kennel Club (UK) in the Toy Group, and the United Kennel Club (US) in the Companion Group), using standards-based upon the Fédération Cynologique Internationale standard. The breed is not recognised by the New Zealand Kennel Club or the Australian National Kennel Council. It also may be recognised in the English-speaking world by any of the very large numbers of minor registries, clubs, and internet-based dog registry businesses.

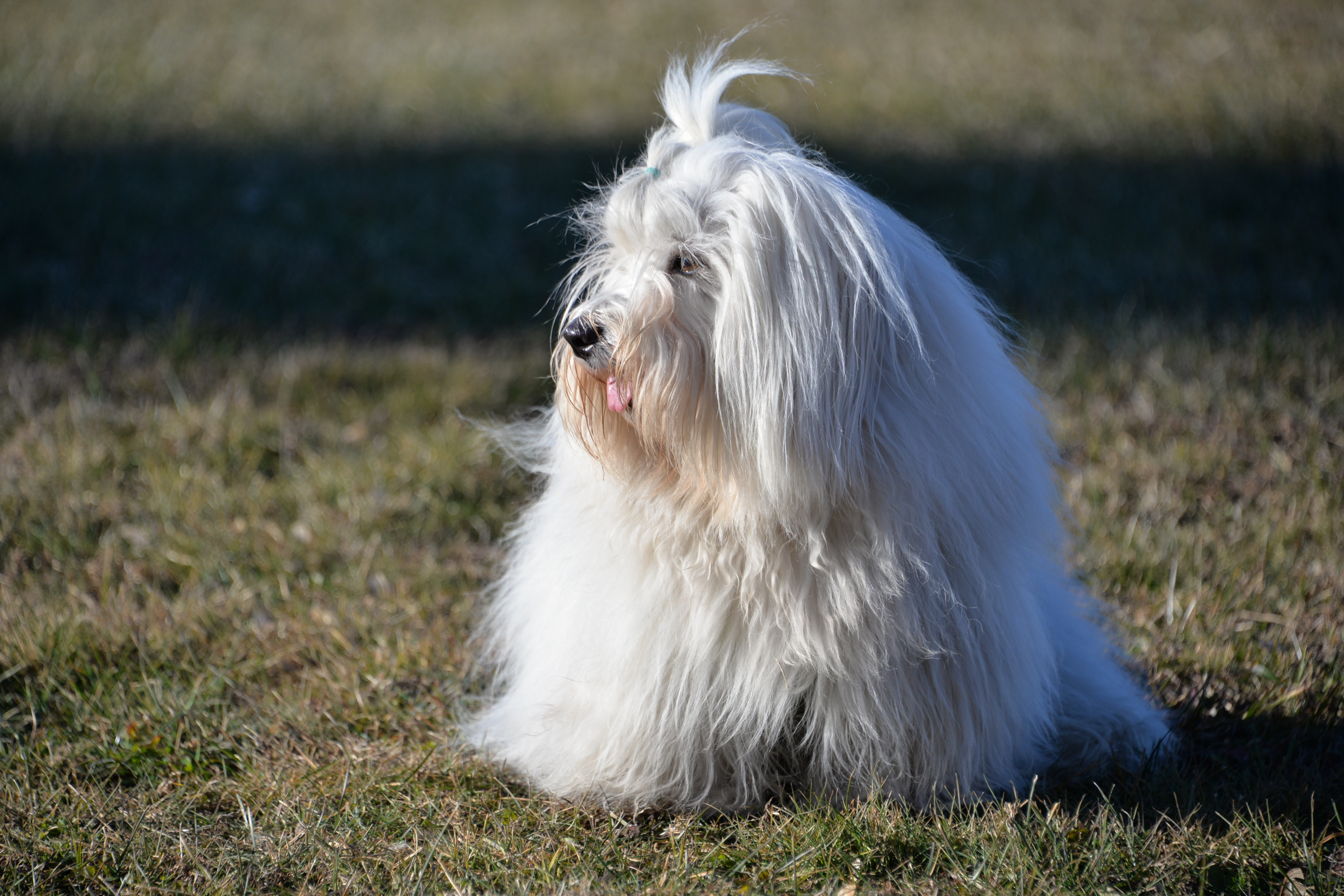
Adult male Coton del Tulear, full-length coat

In the United States, another standard for the Coton de Tuléar was developed based upon the breed in Madagascar in 1974 by a biologist, Dr. Robert Jay Russell. Russell established the Coton de Tuléar Club of America (CTCA) in 1976 and was opposed to American Kennel Club recognition. The Coton de Tuléar entered the American Kennel Club Foundation Stock Service (their first step in breed recognition) in 1996 and became a fully recognized breed on July 1, 2014. The American Kennel Club Parent Club for the breed in the United States of America Coton de Tuléar Club.

The terms "Malagasy Coton" and "European Coton" refer to variations within the Coton de Tulear breed, primarily differing in breed standards and the size of the dog populations. Malagasy Cotons, following the CTCA standard, can be larger and come in various colors, while European Cotons, adhering to the FCI standard, are typically smaller and primarily white. However, both are still considered the same breed, with DNA evidence confirming their genetic similarity.

== See also ==
- List of dog breeds
- Bichon
- Rare breed (dog)
- Havanese
