= Lap dog =

Dog small enough to lie on a person's lap

Lapdog
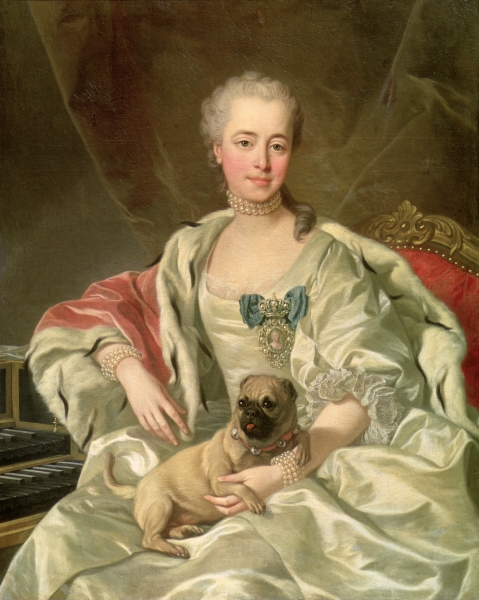
- Princess Ekaterina Dmitrievna Golitsyna with a Pug, 1759.

A lap dog or lapdog is a dog that is both small enough to be held in the arms or lie comfortably on a person's lap and temperamentally predisposed to doing so. Lapdog is not a specific breed, but a generic term for a type of dog that is small in size and friendly toward humans.

Lap dogs historically have been kept in many societies around the world by individuals with the resources to support a non-productive animal, and a lifestyle which allows for much contact with the dog. They are docile companion dogs with no working function other than companionship. Genetic analysis reveals that lapdogs are among the earliest specific types of dogs to live with people. Today, most lapdog breeds fall into the toy breed group.

Additionally, the term lapdog has evolved to refer to a person, organization or country controlled by another who is stronger.

== Appearance ==
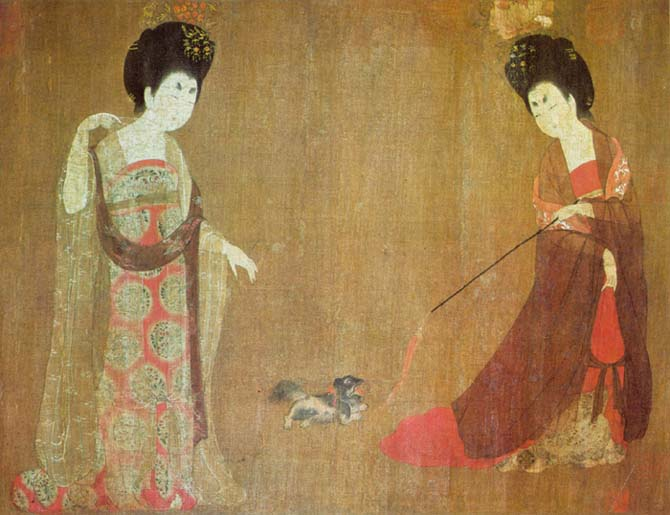
Two women playing with a lap dog, China, 8th century, Beauties Wearing Flowers by Tang dynasty painter Zhou Fang

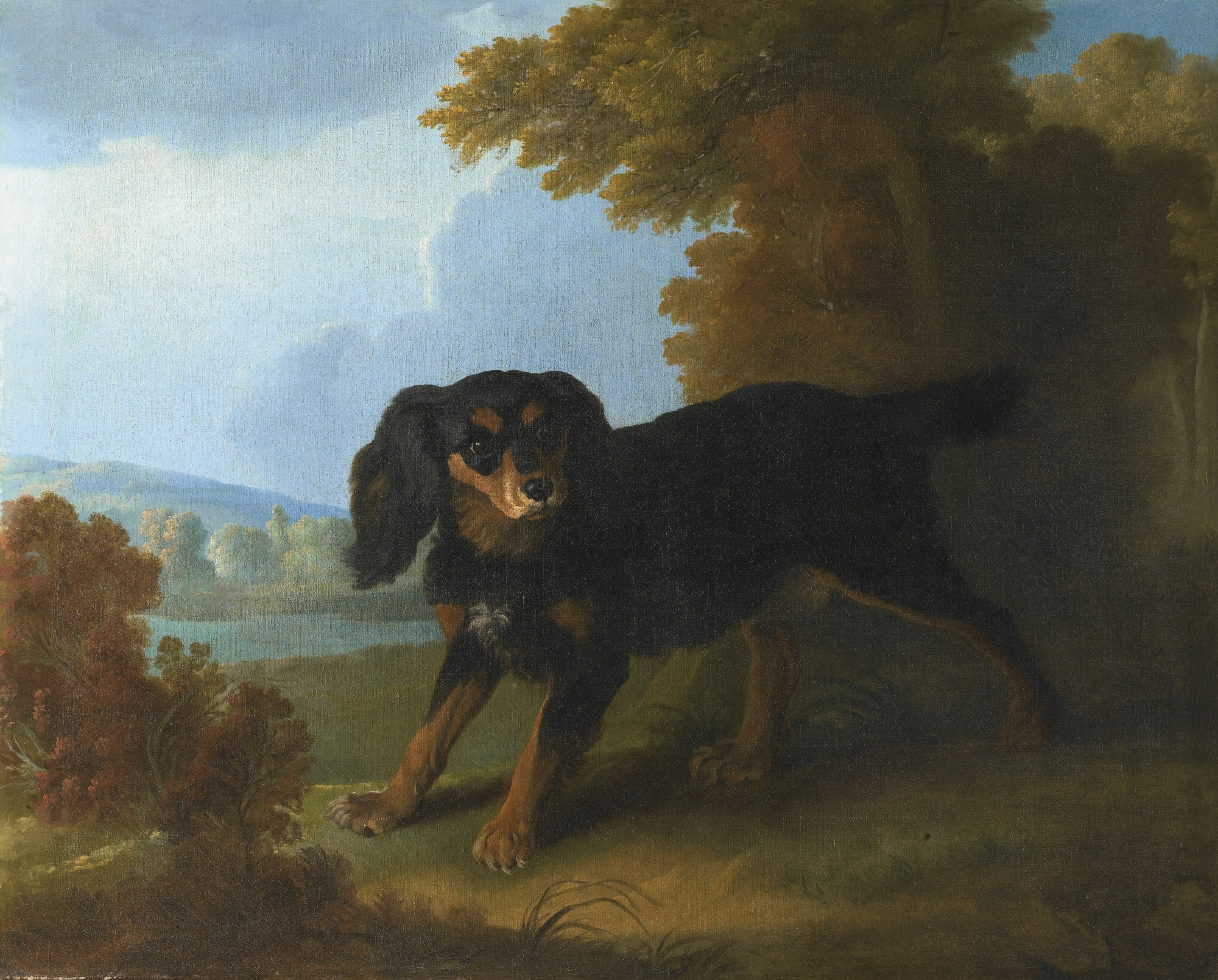
Christophe Huet Portrait of Mimi, Madame De Pompadour's King Charles Spaniel, by Christophe Huet

Some lapdogs have been bred for extremes of small size, such as the Russian and Mexican varieties shown below. Anatomically, lapdogs show distinct differences from their full-sized counterparts. The skull of the immature Russian lapdog from an 1861 specimen (possibly an ancestor of the Bolonka) is approximately the size of a table-tennis ball and shows the relatively short muzzle and high forehead. Many lapdogs are bred to retain puppy-like traits (neoteny) such as folded ears. Body proportions may also have changed, resulting in relatively shorter legs and larger heads. They may also have traits that resemble human babies: size and weight, high forehead, short muzzle and relatively large eyes. Although selective breeding for such traits can have detrimental effects on tear ducts, dentition, and breathing, such traits also serve to cause pet owners to derive more satisfaction from their pet relationship, as the pet owners may view dogs with this appearance as surrogate babies.

== History ==
In addition to their being kept as a pet and providing warmth, lap dogs have been fashion accessories and status symbols, and even to attract fleas away from their owners.

Recent genetic study by Elaine Ostrander confirms that the Pekingese lapdog, bred in ancient China to fit inside the sleeves of a man's robe, is one of the oldest breeds of dog. For centuries, they could be owned only by members of the Chinese Imperial Palace. Similarly ancient are the lapdog ancestors of the modern breeds of Tibetan Terrier, Lhasa Apso, Pug, and Shih Tzu.

In the book De Canibus Britannicis published in English in 1576, the author describes lapdogs as a type of dog, "Spaniel Gentle or Comforter". Ancestors of the modern breed of Cavalier King Charles Spaniel were a type of "Spaniel Gentle" kept by English nobility in the 17th century. Modern breeds of lapdog also include the Bichon Frise, Japanese Terrier, Maltese, Pomeranian, Yorkshire Terrier and many others.

=== Phalène and Papillon ===
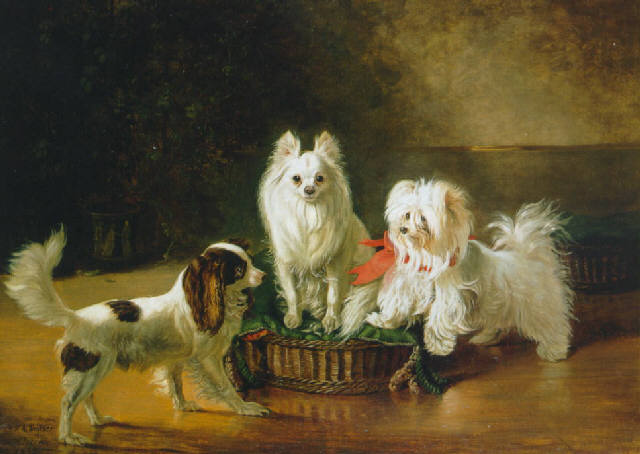
A toy Spaniel, a dwarf Spitz and a Maltese next to a basket (1855) by Johann Friedrich Wilhelm Wegener.

The Phalène is the earliest form of the Papillon; the appearance of the erect-eared variety was not documented until the 16th century, by which time the Phalène had been portrayed in numerous paintings, particularly in portraits of the wealthy by Old Masters and their students. Belgium, France, Spain, and Italy have all been credited with the creation or development of Butterfly Dogs. The dog breed appeared often in portraits of European royalty painted by the Old Masters, which indicates that the breed was favored as lapdogs as early as the 13th century. This sportive and intelligent breed is no longer considered a lap dog.

=== Pekingese ===
According to the 1948 publication Dogs In Britain, A Description of All Native Breeds and Most Foreign Breeds in Britain by Clifford LB Hubbard, the Sleeve Pekingese was (in Hubbard's time) a true miniature of the standard-sized Pekingese and was also known as the Miniature Pekingese. The name Sleeve Pekingese came from the custom of carrying these small dogs in the capacious sleeves of the robes worn by members of the Chinese Imperial Household. Hubbard indicated that this tradition appeared to be early Italian rather than Chinese, but its adoption by the Chinese Imperial Household led to dogs being bred as small as possible and to practices aimed at stunting their growth: giving puppies rice wine, holding new-borns tightly for hours at a time or putting the puppies into tight-fitting wire mesh waistcoats. These practices were apparently forbidden by the late Dowager Empress Tzu Hsi.

In Hubbard's time, the term Sleeve was applied in Britain to a miniature Pekingese no more than 6–7 pounds in weight, often appearing to be about 3–4 pounds. Mrs Flander's Mai Mai weighed only a little over 4 pounds and many other breeders had bred true miniatures of a similar size. Hubbard noted that miniatures sometimes appeared in litters bred from full-sized Pekingese and were exhibited in classes for dogs less than 7 pounds at the major dog shows in Britain. At that time, the Sleeve Pekingese had a strong following with the most popular colours being cream and white.

=== Chihuahua ===
Chihuahuas are one of the smallest lap dog breeds. They are named after the Mexican state of Chihuahua, as that is the dog's potential origin. They are known for their big pointy ears, high pitched bark, and small size. Chihuahuas usually weigh less than 6.6 pounds (3.0 kg) and are usually 6–9 inches (15–23 centimetres) tall. Chihuahuas need proper training and socialization to avoid unwanted defensive behavior. Chihuahuas enjoy quality time in the lap of a favorite person, and if properly managed by a dedicated owner, the Chihuahua can adapt to a household environment easily.

=== Pomeranian ===
Pomeranians are the fluffiest of lap dogs, have a double coat and tend to be a friendly, one-person dog. The Pomeranian has a shedding non-hypoallergenic coat with black, white, black & tan, red, blue, orange, brown and gray colors. The Pomeranian is named after the Pomerania region in Central Europe, split between Germany and Poland.

=== Miniature Pinscher ===
The Miniature Pinscher, min pin for short, is a small breed of dog originating from Germany. The breed's earliest ancestors may have included the German Pinscher mixed with Italian Greyhounds and dachshunds.

=== Shih Tzu ===
Shih Tzu (singular and plural) is one of oldest breeds the roots of which trace back to Tibet and China where they were bred to resemble lions. They ideally range from 9–16 lbs.

== Extinct breeds ==
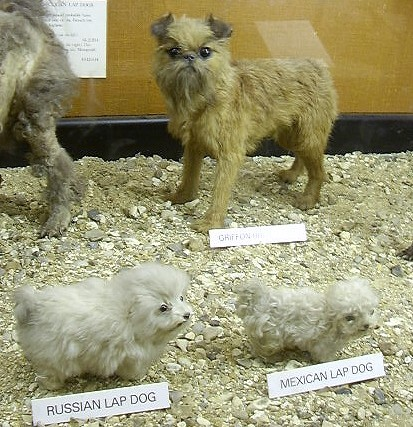
Taxidermied Russian and Mexican lapdogs, along with a Griffon Bruxellois, at the Natural History Museum at Tring

The Russian lapdog and the Mexican lapdog were types of small dogs from Russia and Mexico respectively. The immature Mexican Lapdog could be as small as a golden hamster. During the 19th century it was fashionable to mount immature specimens to look like adults, giving a false impression of adult size:

The very tiniest of the Dog family is the Mexican Lapdog, a creature so very minute in its dimensions as to appear almost fabulous to those who have not seen this animal itself. One of these little canine pets is to be seen in the British Museum, and always attracts much attention from the visitors. Indeed, if it were not in so dignified a locality, it would be generally classed with the mermaid, the flying serpent, and the Tartar lamb, as an admirable example of clever workmanship. It is precisely like those white woollen toy Dogs which sit upon a pair of bellows, and when pressed give forth a nondescript sound, intended to do duty for the legitimate canine bark. To say that it is no larger than these toys would be hardly true, for I have seen in the shop windows many a toy Dog which exceeded in size the veritable Mexican Lapdog.

— The Illustrated Natural History (Mammalia) by the Rev John George Wood, 1853

== See also ==
- Bichon
- Havanese dog
- Maltese dog
- Origin of the domestic dog
