= Lap =

Area at the top of a person's legs

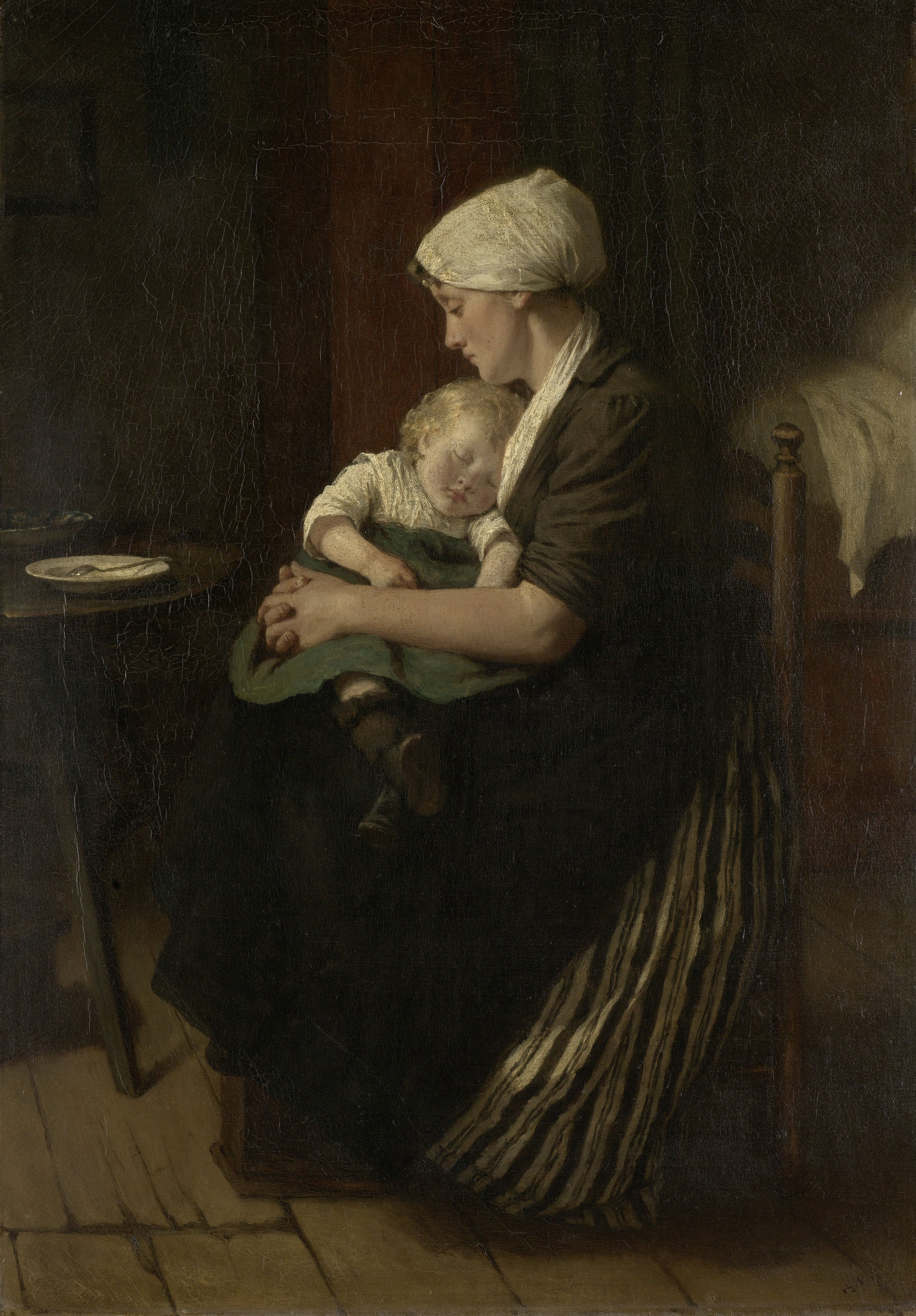
Late 18th-century Dutch painting of a baby asleep in its mother's lap

A lap is a surface (usually horizontal) created between the knee and hips of a biped when it is in a seated or lying down position. The lap of a parent or loved one is seen as a physically and psychologically comfortable place for a child to sit.

In some countries where Christmas is celebrated, it has been a tradition for children to sit on the lap of a person dressed as Santa Claus to tell Santa what they want for Christmas, and have their picture taken.

Among adults, a person sitting on the lap of another usually indicates an intimate or romantic relationship between the two; this is a factor in the erotic activity in strip clubs known as a lap dance, where one person straddles the lap of the other and gyrates their lower extremities in a provocative manner.

A lap steel guitar is a type of steel guitar played in a sitting position with the instrument placed horizontally across the player's knees. The lap can be a useful surface for carrying out tasks when a table is not available. The laptop was so named because it was seen as being able to be used on the user's lap.

== See also ==
- Lap dog
