= Mexican lapdog =

Extinct dog breed

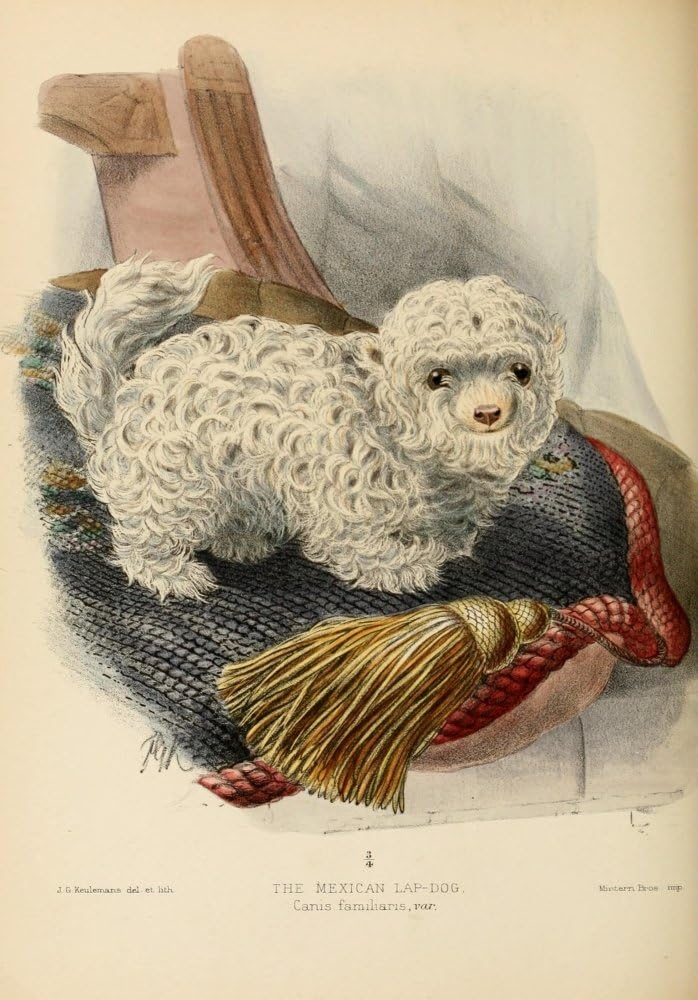
- 1890 illustration by John Gerrard Keulemans
- Origin: Mexico
- Breed status: Extinct

The Mexican lapdog, also known as the Ytzcuinte potzotli, is an extinct breed of lap dog originating in Mexico. Noted for its small size, it was the smallest known dog breed. Another Mexican breed, the chihuahua, is the smallest breed still in existence.

== Characteristics ==
The Mexican lapdog was the smallest of all dog breeds, being nearly identical in size to a guinea pig, with the puppies roughly the size of hamsters. The only surviving taxidermy specimen, which is of unverified maturity, is only 18 centimetres (7.1 in) from the snout to the base of the tail, and 8 centimetres (3.1 in) tall at the shoulders. A contemporary account by John George Wood stated that the breed was smaller than even toy dogs in shop windows.

The breed had medium length white fur, although the fur on its short tail was longer than the fur on the rest of the body. It had a round head, small ears, a flesh-colored nose, and widely separated brown eyes. There were two varieties, a silky-haired one and a woolly-haired one. The latter variety was called the "Mexican mopsy" and was the more popular of the two. Author Dave Madden described the breed as resembling "a guinea pig caught in a wind tunnel". The breed's foundation stock is not known, although it is believed to have likely been descended from European breeds.

Due to its small size, the breed was not used for any sporting or working purposes; an 1875 book refers to it as being "of no use" and "merely an object of curiosity".

== Taxidermy ==
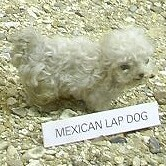
The taxidermy specimen at the Natural History Museum at Tring

Taxidermists of the Victorian era often mounted puppies, marketing them as small adult dogs, for display in cabinets of curiosity. For example, many spaniel puppies were mounted and subsequently sold as "Roman dogs", supposedly found only in the ruins of Ancient Rome. Mexican lapdog puppies were frequent subjects of such taxidermy, owing to their small size. One such puppy, purchased in Liverpool in 1843, was kept in a glass case in the British Museum for many years. The taxidermy puppy is now kept at the Natural History Museum at Tring, and is one of the museum's oldest specimens.

=== Possible hoax ===
Decades after the breed's extinction, author Peter Dance questioned whether such a small breed ever existed. He was told by the British Museum's dog authority, Dr. J. Jewel, that the museum would get donations of similarly tiny dogs, which turned out to be mostly black and tan terrier puppies mounted before they could reach adult size. Dance then concluded that the "breed" likely consisted of puppies from other breeds, which were killed, mounted, and sold ready-made as curiosities.

Even prior to its extinction, some questioned the breed's existence, as it was so small; John George Wood said he would have doubted its existence if the British Museum specimen did not exist.

== See also ==
- List of extinct dog breeds
