= Scissor bite =

Type of bite seen in some mammals

Scissor bite is a type of bite seen in some mammals such as dogs and humans. This type of bite involves outward positioning of the upper posterior teeth and inward positioning of the lower posterior teeth. The reason for this happening is an expanded upper arch and constricted lower arch.

== Humans ==
In humans, a scissor bite does not have any significant influence on the facial profile. However, the chewing habits is influenced due to no contact of molars. Treatment of scissor bite may involve expansion device of the lower arch, usage of cross-elastics in an orthodontic treatment. A new method of using Temporary Anchorage Devices (TADs) has been shown to correct the scissor bite in humans.
