= Havanese dog =

Havanese
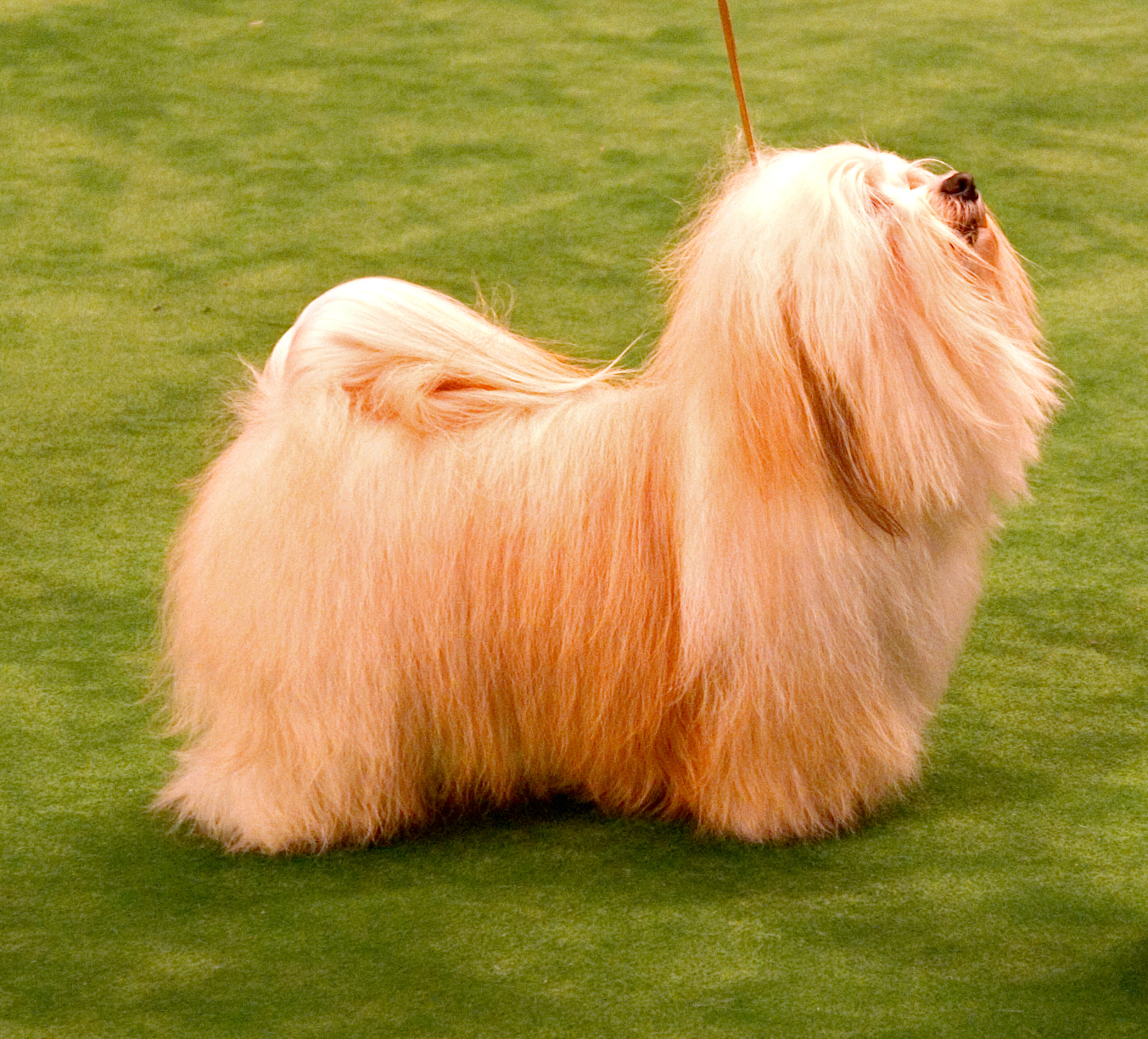
- Other names: Havanese Cuban Bichon; Bichón Havanés; Havaneser; Havanezer; Bichon Habanero
- Origin: Cuba (AKC) / Western Mediterranean region (FCI)
Traits
- Height: 9 in (23 cm)
- Weight: 7–14 lb (3–6 kg)
- Coat: soft
- Color: All colors
Kennel club standards
- Fédération Cynologique Internationale: standard

The Havanese, a bichon-type dog, is the national dog of Cuba, developed from the now extinct Blanquito de la Habana ("little white dog of Havana"). The Blanquito descended from the also now-extinct Bichón Tenerife. It is believed that the Blanquito was eventually cross-bred with other bichon types, including the poodle, to create what is now known as the Havanese. They are sometimes referred to as "Havana Silk Dogs", but this is a separate breed, which has been bred to meet the original Cuban standards.

== Characteristics ==
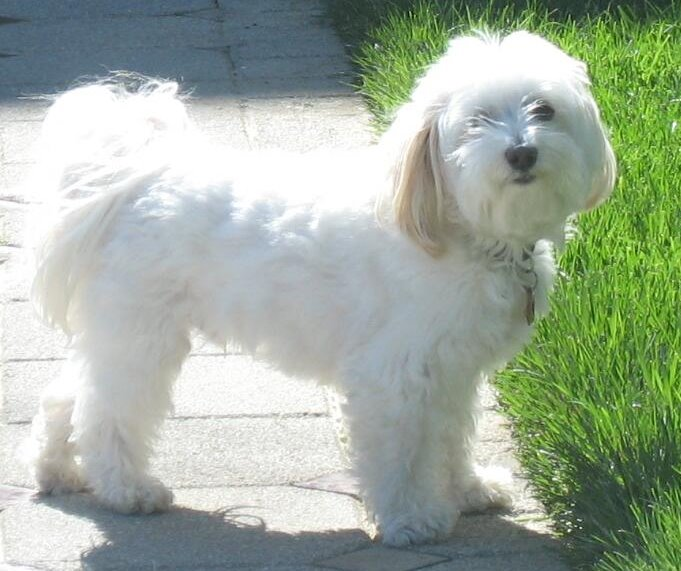
Havanese in the "Puppy Cut" which is favored by some non-show dog owners

=== Appearance ===
The Havanese is a toy dog with a silky coat. The height of the Havanese ranges from 8 1/2 to 11 1/2 in (22 to 29 cm) at the withers with 9 to 10 1/2 in (23 to 27 cm) being the ideal height. The body, measured from point of shoulder to point of buttocks, is slightly longer than the height at the withers, giving the dog the appearance of being slightly longer than tall.

A unique aspect of the breed is the topline, which rises just slightly from withers to the croup, creating a topline that is straight but not level. Renowned for their flashy, lively gait, their strong rear drive and slightly shorter upper arm produce a springy motion rather than a far-reaching one. The angle of the topline does not change while moving at a natural gait.

The muzzle is full and tapers slightly at the nose. It does not have the appearance of being short or snipy. Length of skull measured from stop to point of occiput is equal to the length of muzzle. The top of the skull is rather flat and the back skull is rounded.

The length from foot to elbow is equal to the length from elbow to withers. The fore chest is pronounced. When in a standing position, the sternum lines up with the elbows, creating a deep chest. Ribs are well-sprung and the abdomen is moderately tucked up.

The Havanese has solid black eyes — except for the chocolate colored dogs which may have brown eyes — and almond-shaped lids surrounded by black pigment. The ears, when extended, reach halfway to the nose. They arc slightly upward at the base and hang down on the sides of the head without touching the face. The tail is carried arched forward up over the back. While the tail's long plume of hair falls on the body, the tail itself never touches the back.

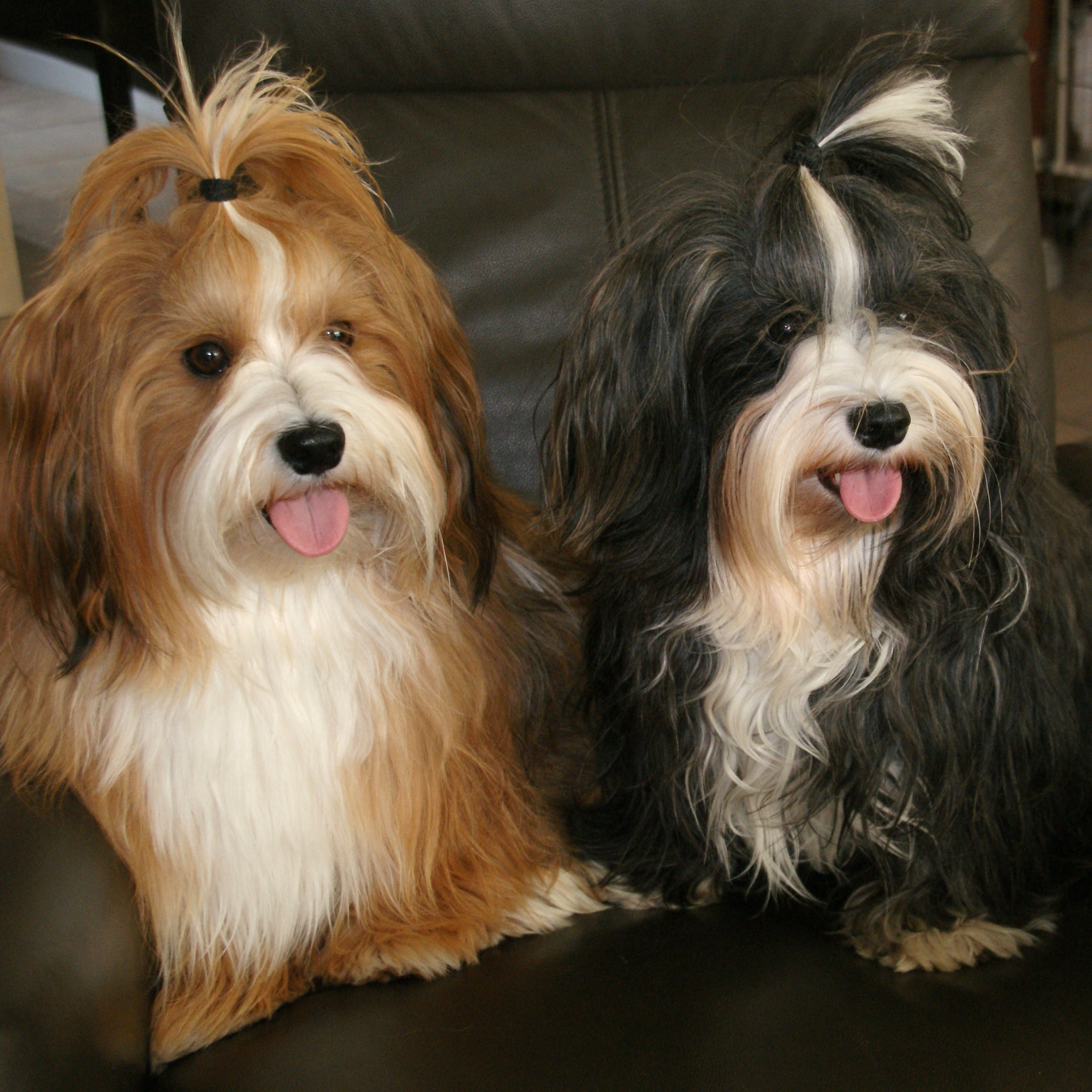
Brindle and white Havanese and red and white Havanese

==== Coat and color ====
Havanese have a long and furnished double coat. The coat is long, soft, lightweight, and silky. The Havanese coat is slightly wavy, profuse, and undulating. Unlike other double-coated breeds, the Havanese outer coat is neither coarse nor overly dense, but rather soft and light. The undercoat is sometimes completely absent. The Havanese coat should be very soft, almost cool to the touch, like silk.

The coat is shown naturally brushed out or corded, a technique which turns the long coat into cords of hair, similar to locks in humans.

Although there are a few arguments on whether the original Havanese were all white or of different colors , modern Havanese are acceptable in all coat colors and patterns. All colored dogs should have a black nose and black pigment around the eyes, with the exception of chocolate (brown) dogs, which may have dark brown pigment on their nose instead.

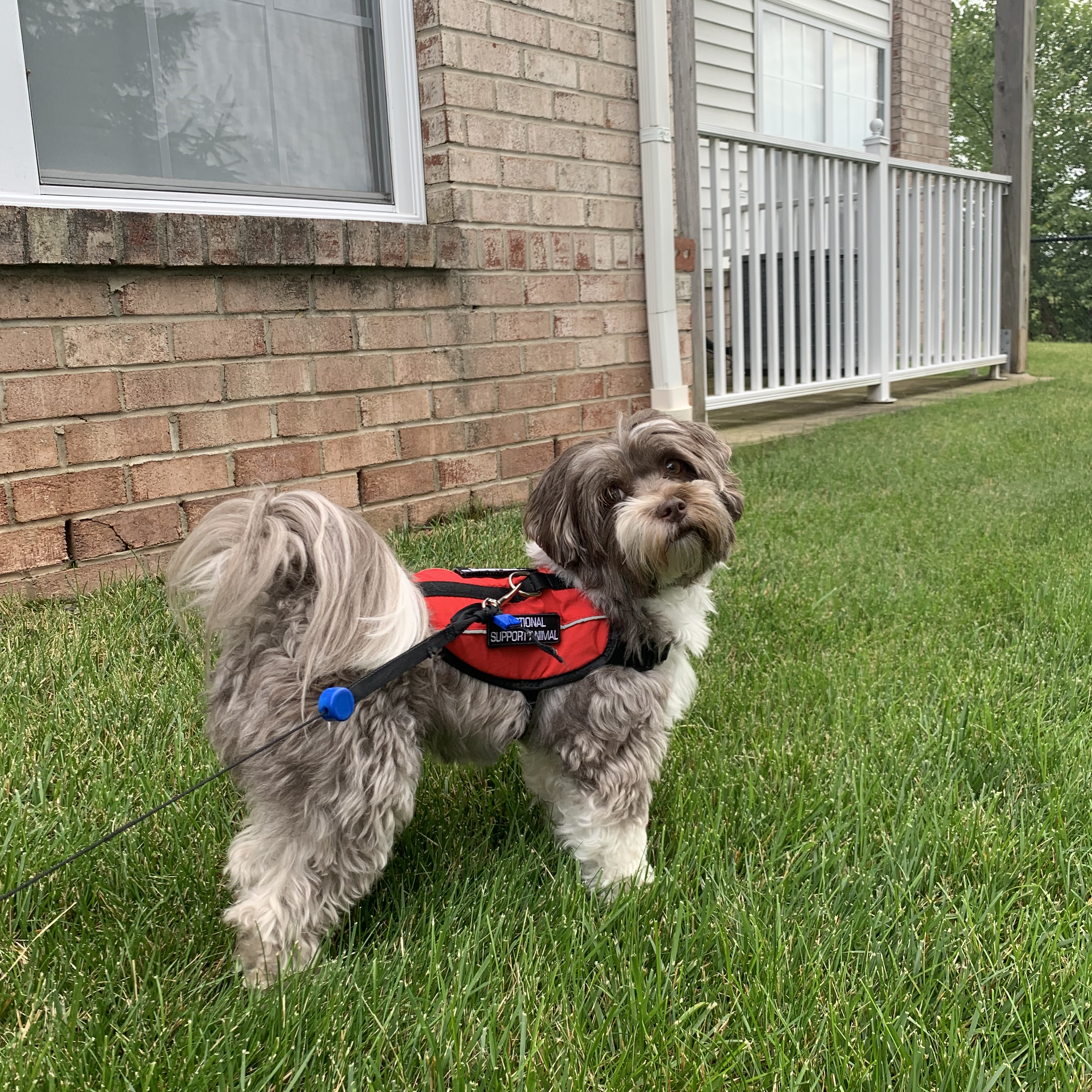
Trimmed Havanese

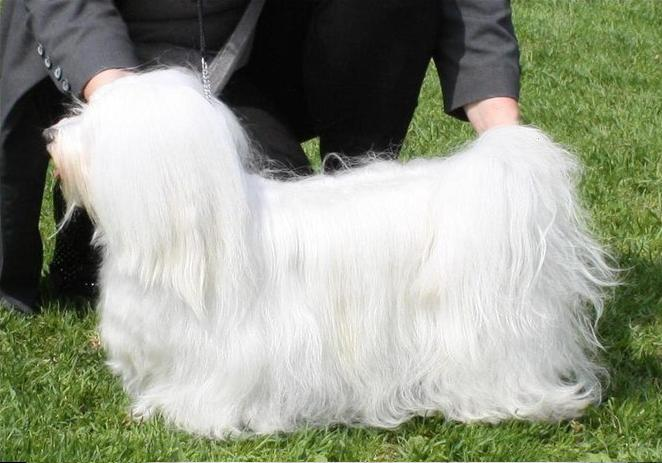
A show winning Havanese

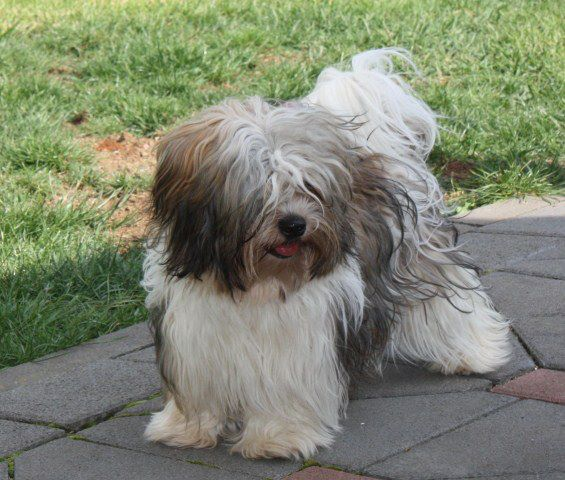
The Havanese is a member of the bichon family of dogs.

== Health ==
A 2024 UK study found a life expectancy of 14.5 years compared to 12.7 years for purebreeds and 12 years for crossbreeds from a sample of 56 Havanese dogs.

Havanese suffer primarily from luxating patella, liver disease, heart disease, cataracts and retinal dysplasia.

The Havanese is predisposed to sebaceous adenitis.

A study of over 90,000 dogs attending the University of California-Davis Veterinary Medical Teaching Hospital found the Havanese to be predisposed to portosystemic shunt: 4.35% of Havanese had the condition compared to 0.35% for mixed-breed dogs.

== History ==
The Havanese is a member of the bichon family of dogs. The progenitors of the breed are believed to have come from Tenerife. Ship manifests from Tenerife bound for Cuba list dogs as passengers brought aboard, and these dogs were most probably the dog of Tenerife. Some believe the entire bichon family of dogs can be traced back to the Tenerife dog, while others theorize that the origins are in Malta, citing the writings of Aristotle, and other historical evidence of the early presence of such dogs in Malta. Whatever the actual origins of bichon dogs, these little dogs soon became devoted companions to the Spanish colonists in Cuba and were highly admired by the nobility.

As part of the Cuban Revolution, upper-class Cubans and others marked out for annihilation by the communists fled to the United States, but few were able to bring their dogs. When American breeders became interested in this rare and charming dog in the 1970s, the US gene pool was only 11 dogs.

With dedicated breeding, and the acquisition of some new dogs internationally, the Havanese made a huge comeback in terms of its population. Since being first recognized by the American Kennel Club (AKC) officially in 1996, it has become one of the fastest growing breeds of dogs in terms of registration popularity, becoming the 25th most popular pure-breed in the United States in 2013. in 2017, the Havanese cracked the top 5 most popular breeds registered by the Canadian Kennel Club.

== Activities ==
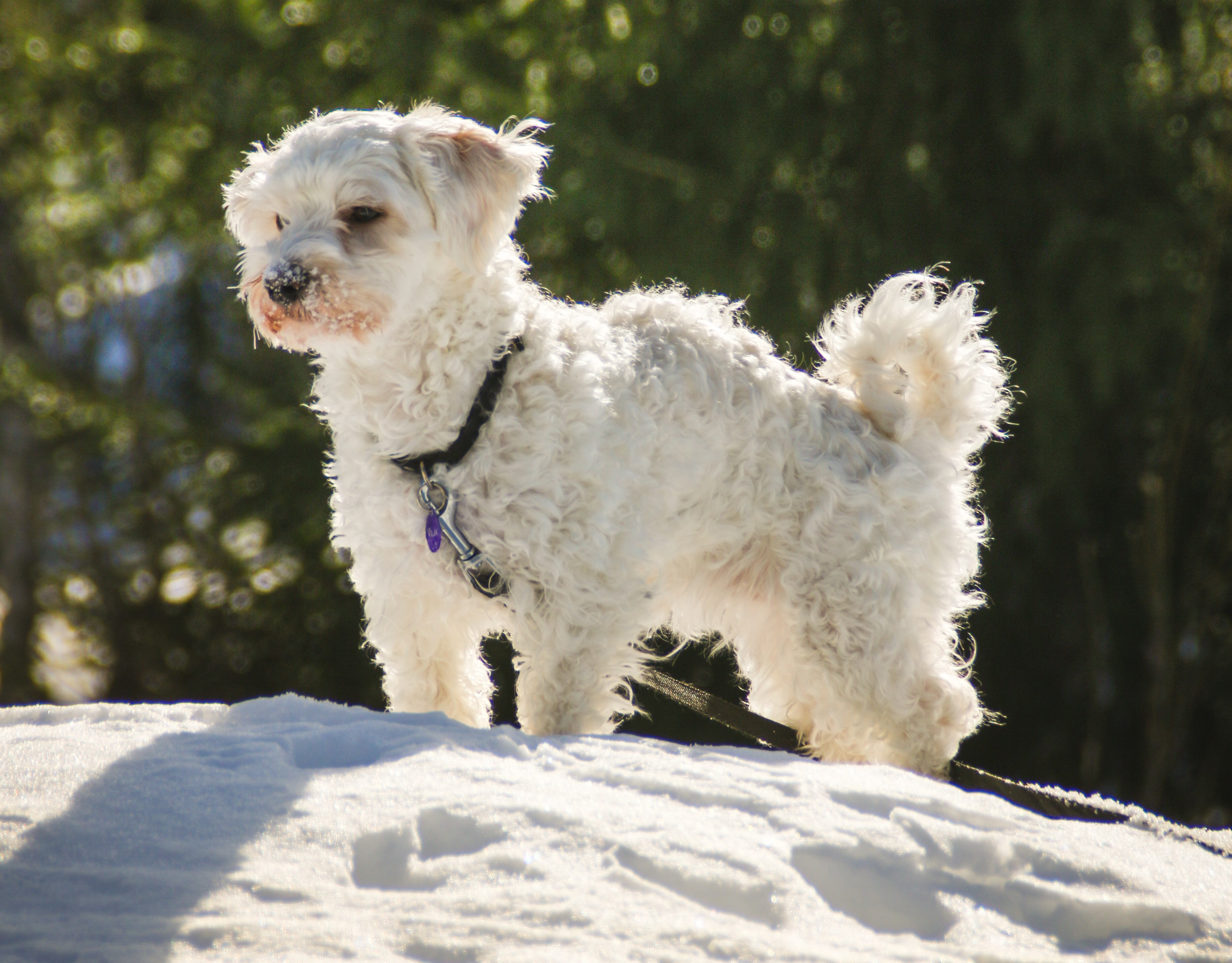
A Havanese dog standing in the snow

Because of the Havanese's friendly and readily trained nature, it is used for a variety of jobs involving the public, including therapy dogs, assistance dogs, such as signal dogs for the hearing impaired, performing dogs, mold and termite detection, and tracking.

Havanese also compete in a variety of dog sports, such as dog agility, flyball, musical canine freestyle, and obedience training.

== As show dogs ==
The breed standard notes that except for slight trimming around the feet to allow for a tidy foot, they are to be shown untrimmed; any further trimming, back-combing, or other fussing is against type and will not be allowed to the point of precluding placement in dog shows. The breed standard specifies that the tail may not be docked. The American Kennel Club Standard allows head furnishings above each eye to be held in two small braids secured with plain elastic bands.

== See also ==
- List of dog breeds
- Lap dog
- Rare breed (dog)
- Companion dog
- Toy dog
