= Bichon =

Type of toy dog

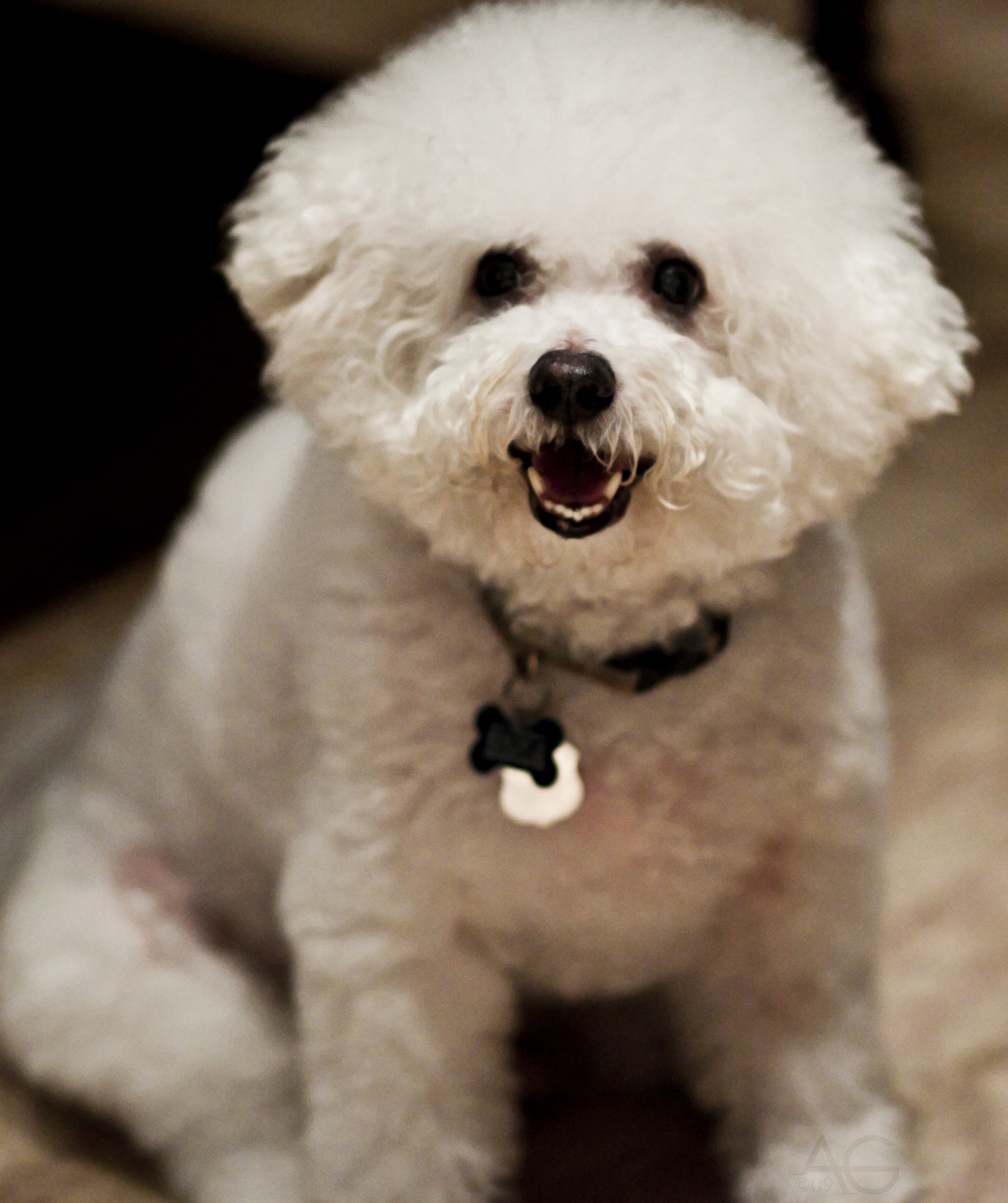
Bichon Frisé

A bichon is a distinct type of toy dog; it is typically kept as a companion dog. Believed to be descended from the Barbet, it is believed the bichon-type dates to at least the 11th century; it was relatively common in 14th-century France, where they were kept as pets of the royalty and aristocracy. From France, these dogs spread throughout the courts of Europe, with dogs of very similar form being seen in a number of portraits of the upper classes of Germany, Portugal and Spain; from Europe, the type also spread to colonies in Africa and South America. The name "bichon" is believed to be a contraction of "barbichon", which means "little barbet".

== Breeds ==
=== Bichon Frisé ===
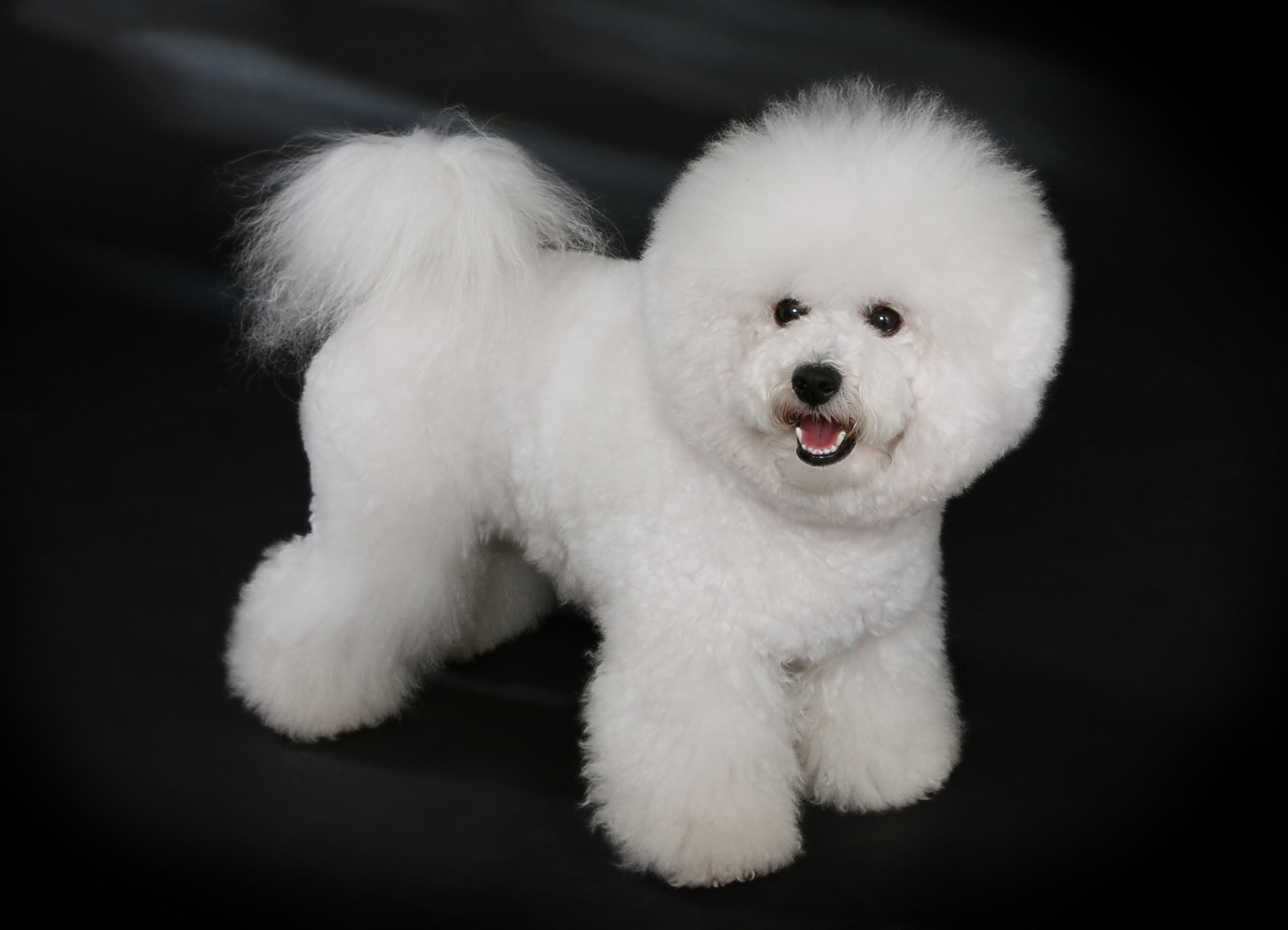
Bichon Frisé

The Bichon Frisé, formally known as the Bichon Tenerife, Tenerife dog or Canary Island lap dog, was bred on the island of Tenerife; it was believed to be descended from bichon-type dogs introduced from Spain in the 16th century. From the Canary Islands, the breed was imported back to the Continent where it became the sometimes favourite of the European courts, its fortunes depending upon the fashions of the time; during an ebb in the breed's popularity it found its way into a number of circuses, performing throughout Europe with organ grinders. The breed again fell out of favour from the end of the 19th century and it was due to the efforts of Belgian and French enthusiasts in the 1930s that rescued it from extinction, which is why it is today recognised as a Franco-Belgian dog breed.

Bichon Frisé are prone to developing cataracts. According to the long-term clinical research of over 1100 affected dogs, this type of cataracts usually appear on anterior and posterior cortices. Also, cataracts impact equally on male and female dogs. Although cataracts develop into stages differently based on individuals, the average 4 years is typically the whole process from incipient to completely mature, which possibly cause blind. Bichons between 2 and 8 years are the most affected.

=== Bolognese ===
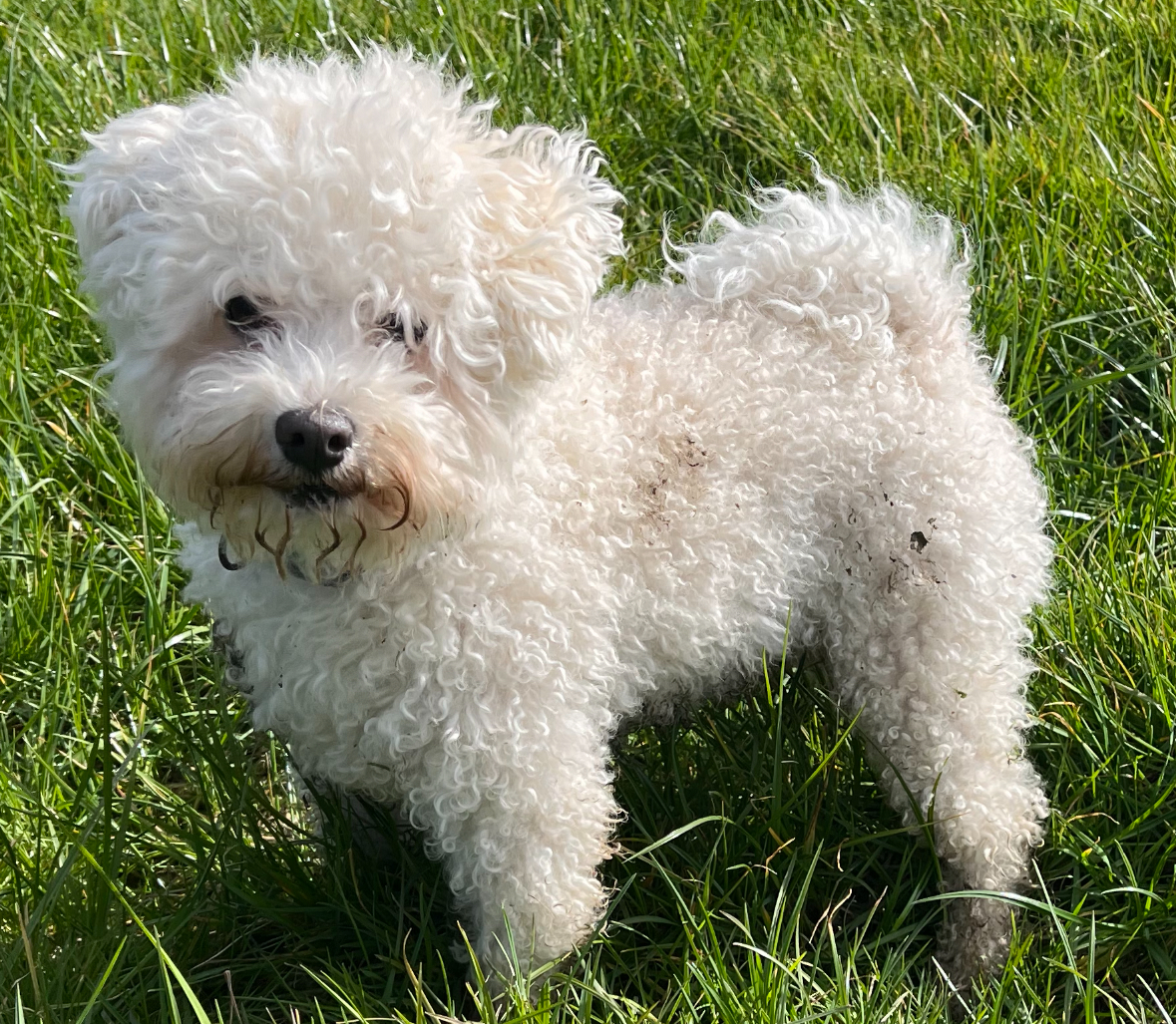
Bolognese

The Bolognese, also known as the Bichon Bolognese, Bolognese toy dog, Bologneser, Gutschen Hundle or Schoshundle, takes its name from the northern Italian city of Bologna. It is usually claimed the breed descends from the Maltese. It is believed examples of the breed were kept by the Medici family, who gave these dogs as gifts to garner favour. it is said that Louis XIV of France, Philip II of Spain and Catherine the Great of Russia, among other European rulers, all kept some.

=== Bolonka ===
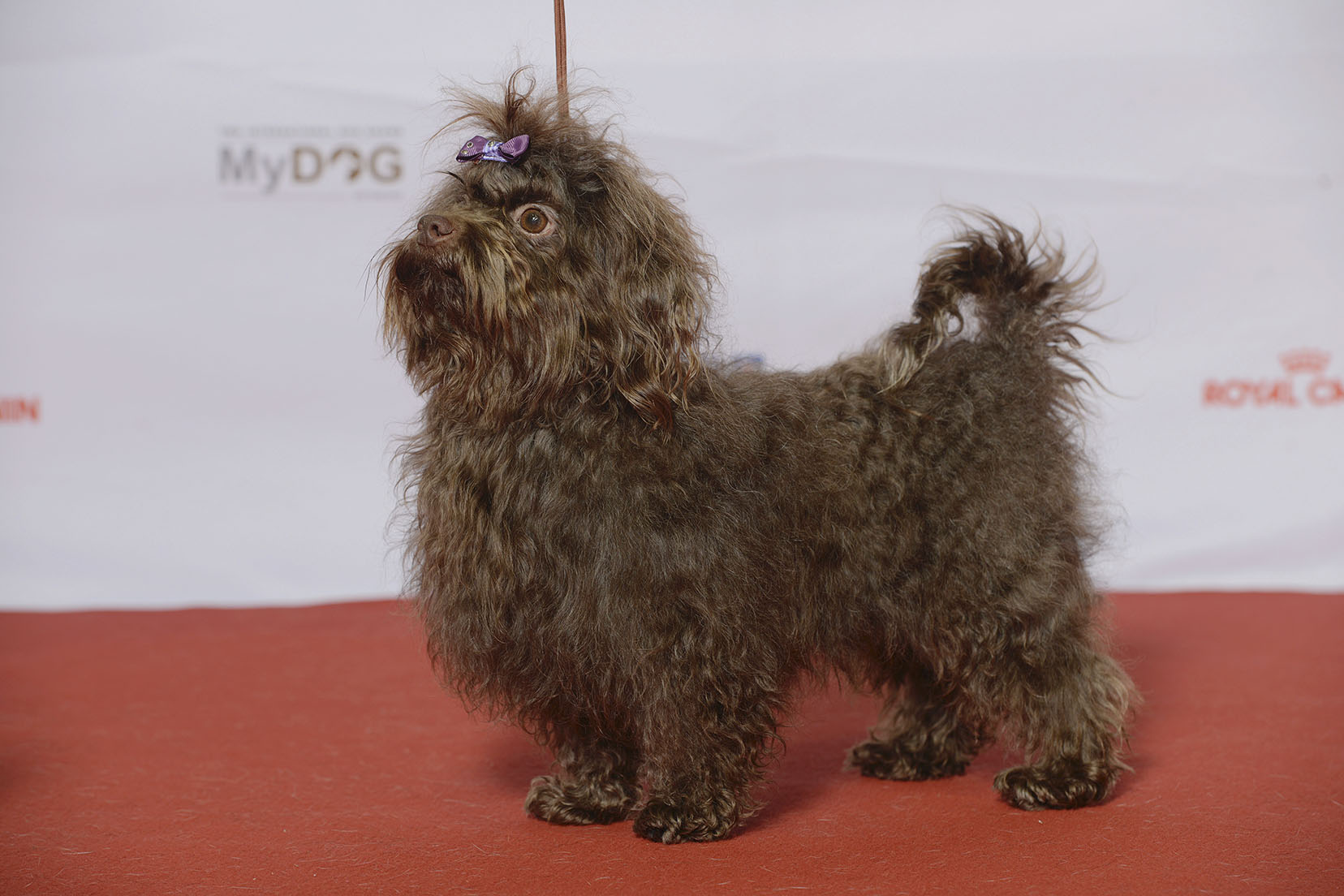
Bolonka

The Bolonka, also known as the Bolonka Zwetna, is a recently developed breed from Russia. It is a coloured variation of the white Bolonka Franzuska that was established as a breed in 1988.

=== Bolonka Franzuska ===
The name of the breed means French lap dog (franzuskaja = French, Bolonka = lap dog, French Bichon). Since the Renaissance, Bolognese lap dogs have enjoyed great popularity and admiration in princely and royal houses. The close ties between the French and Russian nobility led to the spread of the lap dogs of the French ladies to tsarist Russia. Even Catherine the Great loved and adored these dwarf puppies. She owned a few puppies during her reign at the Romanov Tsar's Court.

=== Coton de Tuléar ===
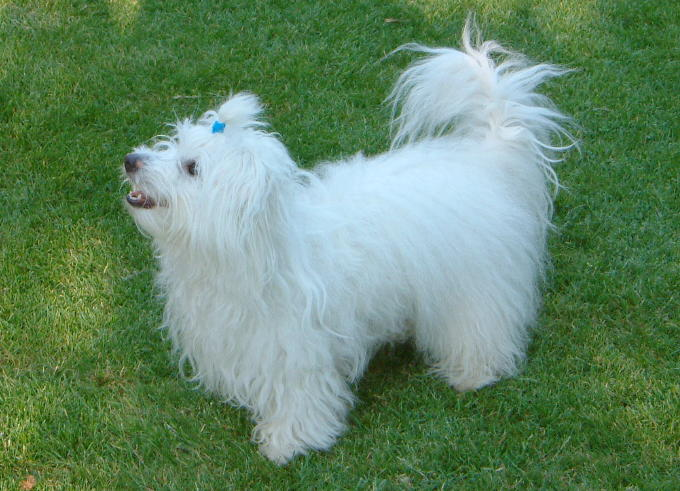
Coton de Tulear

The Coton de Tuléar takes its name from the Madagascan port town of Tuléar, where it originated. The ancestors of these dogs were likely brought to Madagascar in the 17th century, where they became extremely popular with the local ruling class; they became so popular that laws were passed to prevent them being owned by commoners. The breed was relatively unknown to the outside world until the 1970s, when examples were exported to Europe and North America.

=== Havanese ===
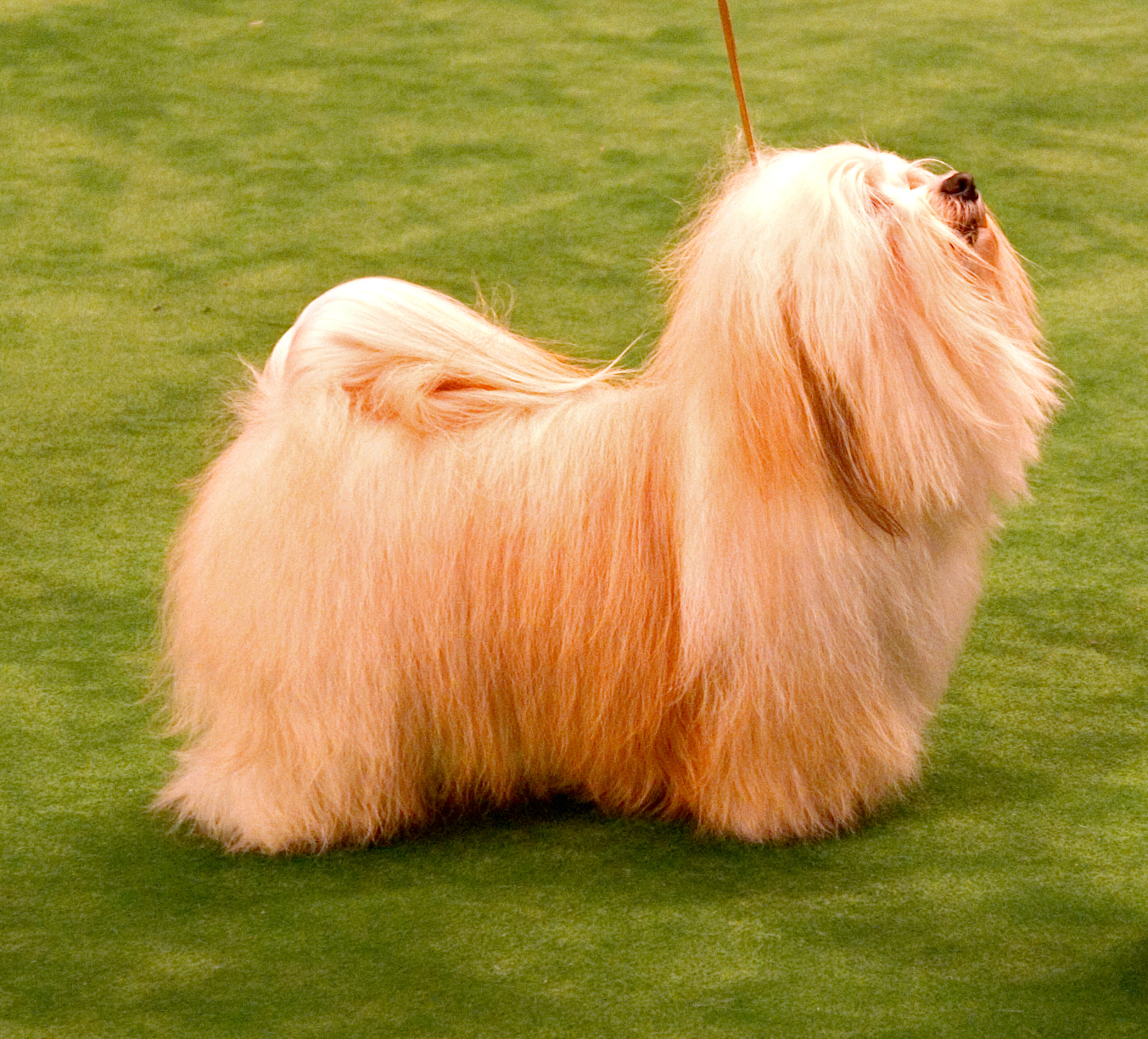
Havanese

The Havanese, also known as the Cuban shock dog, Bichon Havanais, Havana silk dog, Havana Spaniel, Havana Bichon or sometimes just the Havana, is a bichon-type breed from Cuba, taking its name from Havana. The breed is believed to be descended from bichon-type dogs imported to Cuba by Europeans in the 18th century, where it thrived. The breed's fortunes turned with the Cuban Revolution in the 1950s; the Communists saw these dogs as the property of the former elite and sought to eliminate such dogs; the breed was saved by expatriates who fled with their pets to the United States.

=== Löwchen ===
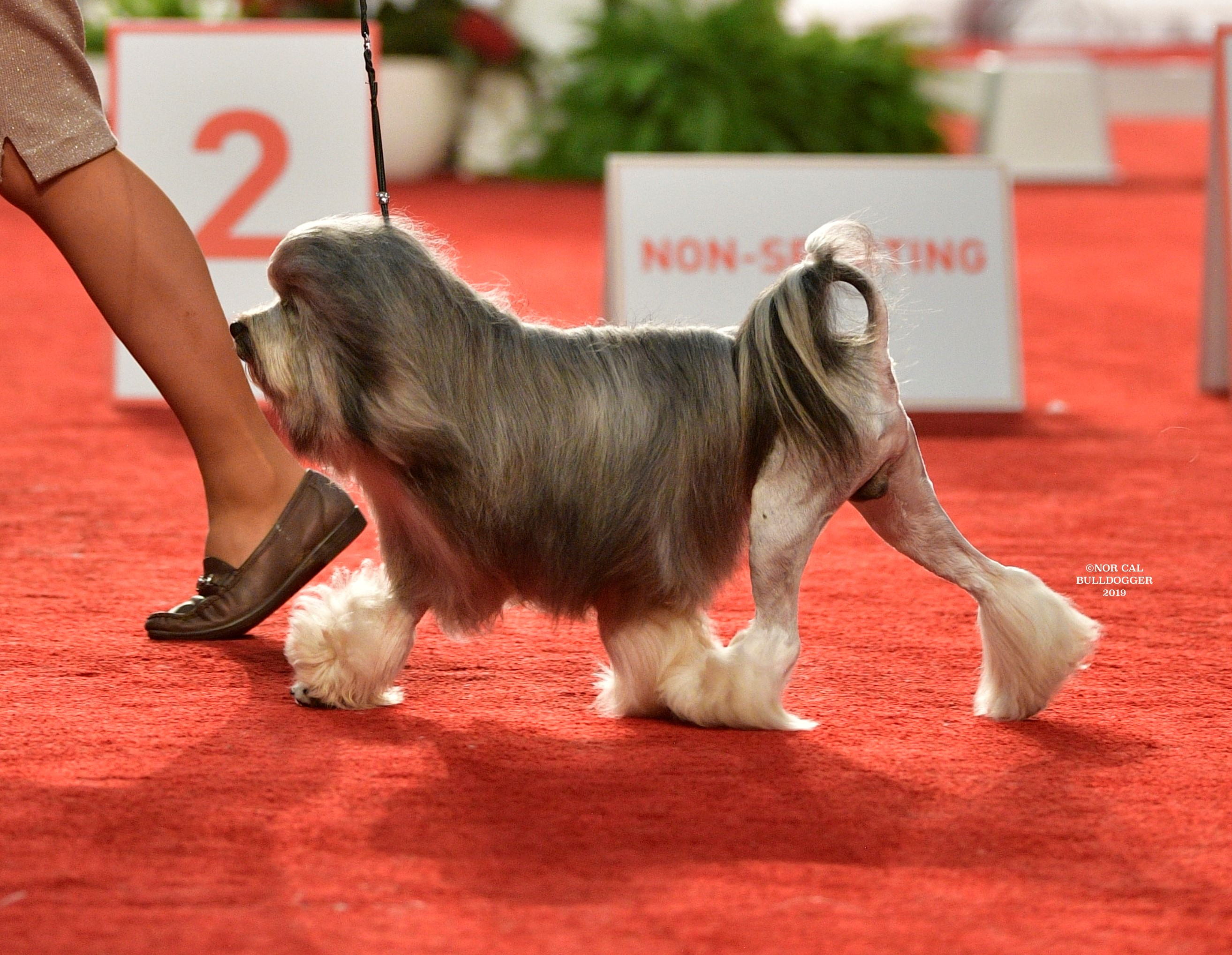
Löwchen

The Löwchen, whose name means "little lion dog" in German, is another French breed of the bichon-type. The breed was known as early as the 16th century; by the 1970s, it was estimated only 70 remained, although thanks to a publicity drive the breed has recovered. Usually clipped to resemble a lion with a mane, when its hair grows naturally its resemblance to other breeds of the type is clear.

=== Maltese ===
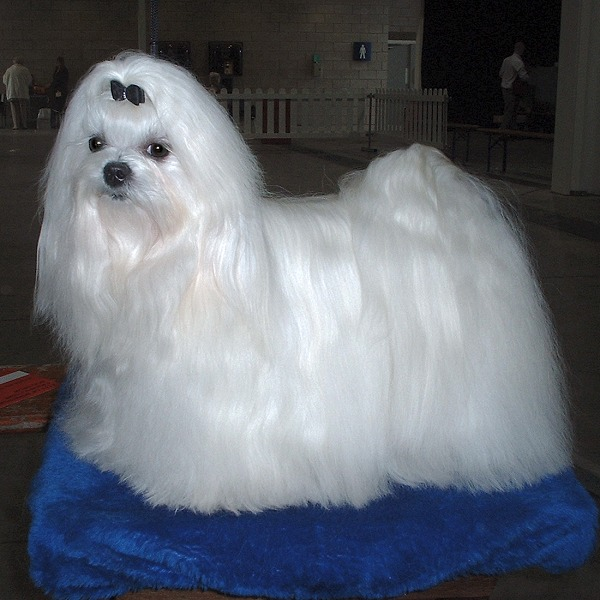
Maltese

The Maltese, sometimes called the Bichon Maltaise, is claimed to be descended from dogs brought to Malta by the Phoenicians in ancient times. Proponents of this theory cite ancient artwork from Malta with dogs of similar form, although the first concrete record of this breed dates from 1805 when the Knights of Malta wrote that the once famous local dog was almost extinct. Today's Maltese is likely the result of subsequent crosses, and they became increasingly popular throughout the 19th and 20th centuries.

== See also ==
- List of dog breeds
