= Afghan Girls Robotics Team =

All-girl robotics team from Afghanistan

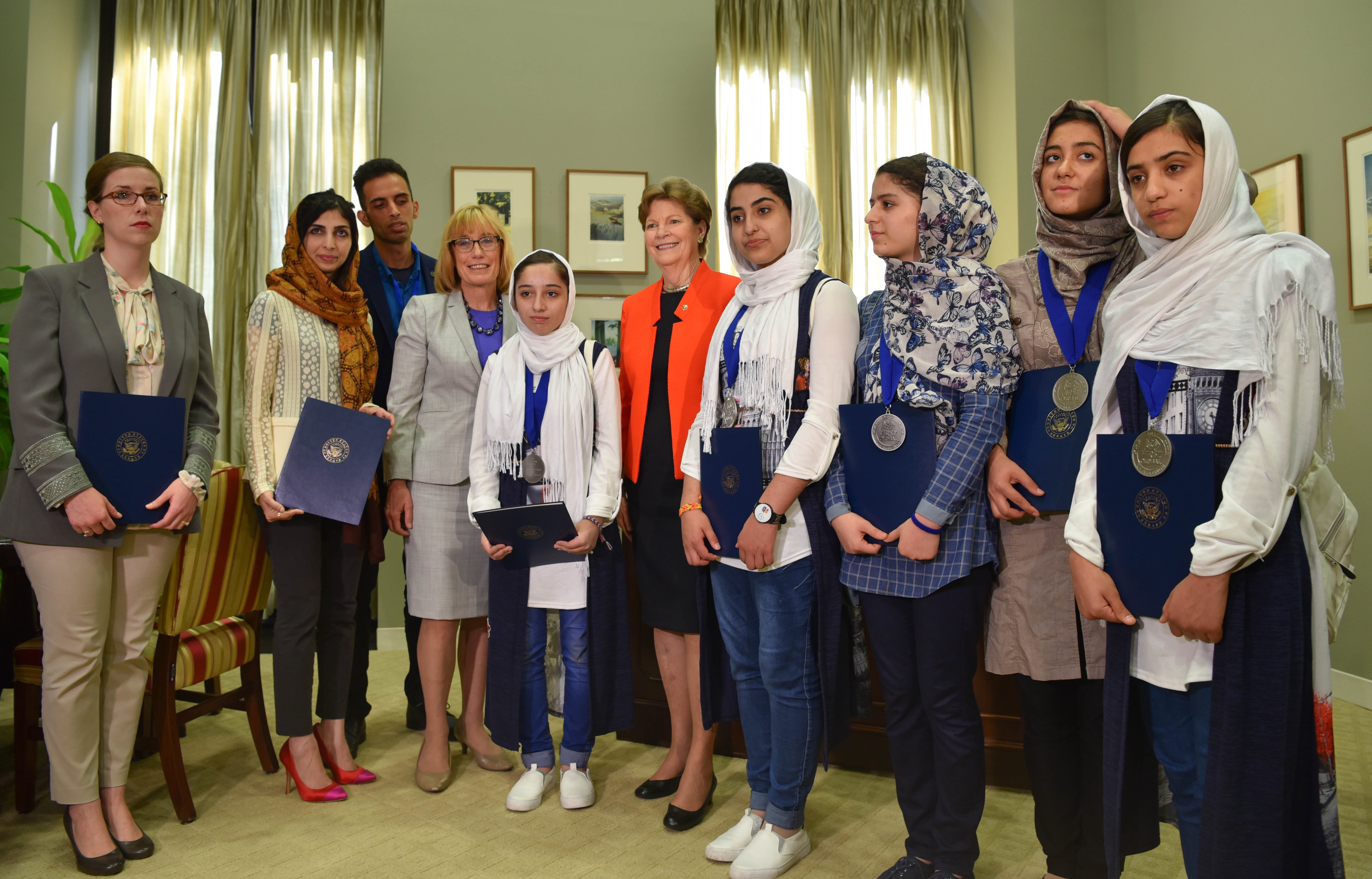
The Afghan Girls Robotics Team with United States senators Jeanne Shaheen and Margaret Wood Hassan in July 2017

The Afghan Girls Robotics Team, also known as the Afghan Dreamers, is an all-girl robotics team from Herat, Afghanistan, founded through the Digital Citizen Fund (DCF) in 2017 by Roya Mahboob and Alireza Mehraban. It is made up of girls between ages 12 and 18 and their mentors. Several members of the team were relocated to Qatar and Mexico by humanitarian and tech entrepreneur Sarah Porter following the fall of Kabul in August 2021. A documentary film featuring members of the team, titled Afghan Dreamers, was released by MTV Documentary Films in 2023.

== Origins ==
The Afghan Girls Robotics Team was co-founded in 2017 by Roya Mahboob, who is their coach, mentor and sponsor, and founder of the Digital Citizen Fund (DCF), which is the parent organization for the team. Dean Kamen was planning a 2017 competition in the United States and had recruited Mahboob to form a team from Afghanistan. Out of 150 girls, 12 were selected for the first team. Before parts were sent by Kamen, they trained in the basement of the home of Mahboob's parents, with scrap metal and without safety equipment under the guidance of their coach, Mahboob's brother Alireza Mehraban, who is also a co-founder of the team.

== 2017 and 2018 ==
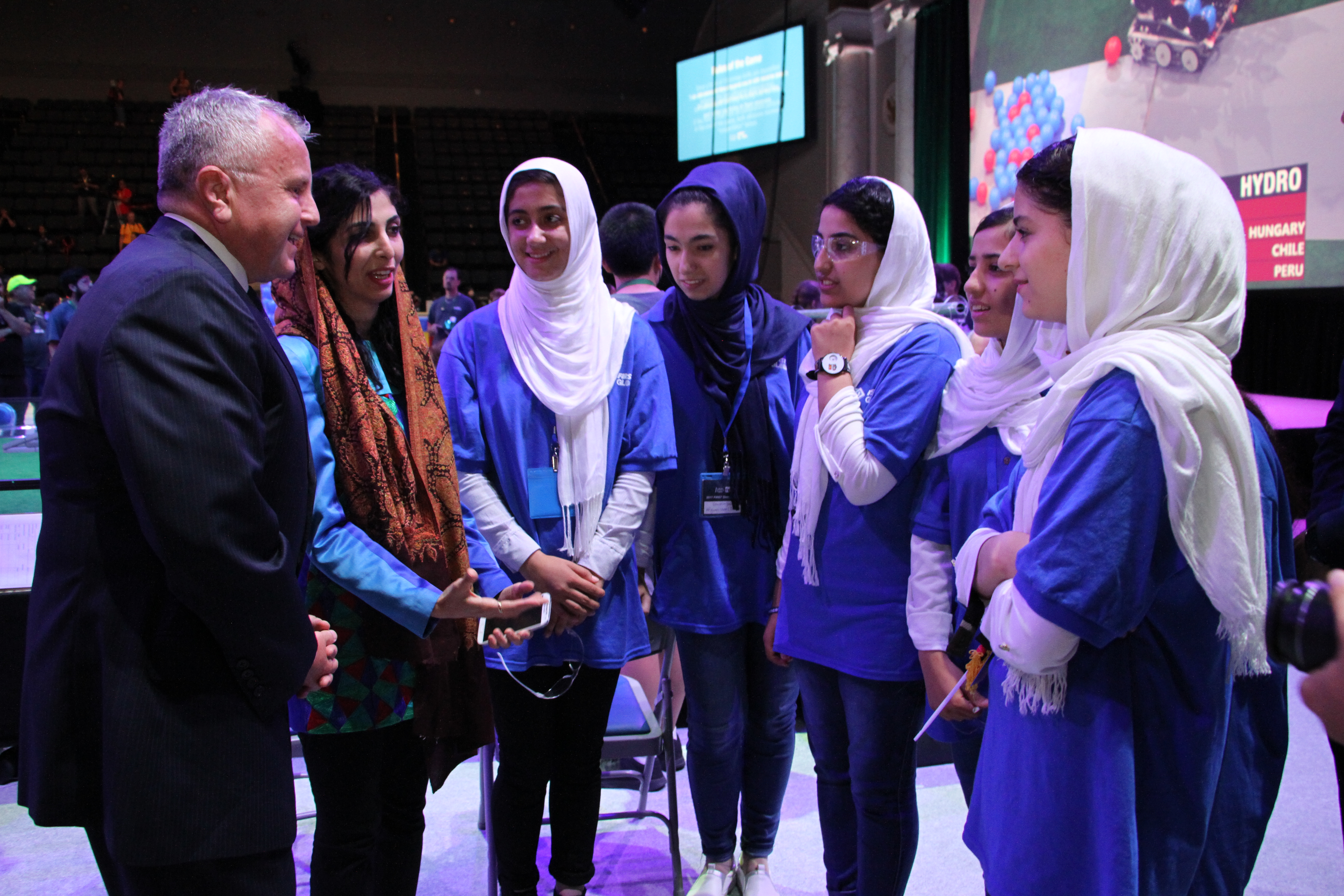
The Afghan Girls Robotics Team meeting U.S Deputy Secretary of State John Sullivan at the 2017 FIRST Global Challenge Robotics Competition

In 2017, six members of the Afghan Girls Robotics Team traveled to the United States to participate in the international FIRST Global Challenge robotics competition. Their visas were rejected twice after they made two journeys from Herat to Kabul through Taliban-controlled areas, before officials in the United States government intervened to allow them to enter the United States. Customs officials also detained their robotics kits, which left them two weeks to construct their robot, unlike some teams that had more time. They were awarded a Silver medal for Courageous Achievement. One week after they returned home from the competition, the father of team captain Fatemah Qaderyan, Mohammad Asif Qaderyan, was killed in a suicide bombing.

After their United States visas expired, the team participated in competitions in Estonia and Istanbul. Three of the 12 members participated in the 2017 Entrepreneurial Challenge at the Robotex festival in Estonia, and won the competition for their solar-powered robot designed to assist farmers. In 2018, the team trained in Canada, continued to travel in the United States for months and participate in competitions.

== 2019 ==
The Afghan Girls Robotics team had aspirations to develop a science and technology school for girls in Afghanistan. Roya Mahboob interfaced with the School of Engineering and Applied Sciences (SEAS), the School of Architecture, and the Whitney and Betty MacMillan Center for International and Area Studies Yale University to design the infrastructure for what they named The Dreamer Institute.

== 2020 ==
In March 2020, the governor of Herat at the time, in response to the COVID-19 pandemic in Afghanistan and a scarcity of ventilators, sought help with the design of low-cost ventilators, and the Afghan Girls Robotics Team was one of six teams contacted by the government. Using a design from Massachusetts Institute of Technology and with guidance from MIT engineers and Douglas Chin, a surgeon in California, the team developed a prototype with Toyota Corolla parts and a chain drive from a Honda motorcycle. UNICEF also supported the team with the acquisition of necessary parts during the three months they spent building the prototype that was completed in July 2020. Their design costs around $500 compared to $50,000 for a ventilator.

In December 2020, Minister of Industry and Commerce Nizar Ahmad Ghoryani donated funding and obtained land for a factory to produce the ventilators. Under the direction of their mentor Roya Mahboob, the Afghan Dreamers also designed a UVC Robot for sanitization, and a Spray Robot for disinfection, both of which were approved by the Ministry of Health for production.

== 2021 ==
In early August 2021, Somaya Faruqi, former captain of the team, was quoted by Public Radio International about the future of Afghanistan, stating, "We don’t support any group over another but for us what’s important is that we be able to continue our work. Women in Afghanistan have made a lot of progress over the past two decades and this progress must be respected."

On August 17, 2021, the Afghan Girls Robotics Team and their coaches were reported to be attempting to evacuate, but unable to obtain a flight out of Afghanistan, and a lawyer appealed to Canada for assistance regarding the evacuation of the team members. As of August 19, 2021, nine members of the team and their coaches had evacuated to Qatar. The founder of the team, Roya Mahboob, and DCF board member, Elizabeth Schaeffer Brown, were previously in contact with the Qatari government to assist the team members in their evacuation from Afghanistan.

By August 25, 2021, some members arrived in Mexico. Saghar, a team member who evacuated to Mexico, said, "We wanted to continue the path that we started to continue to go for our achievements and to go for having our dreams through reality. So that's why we decided to leave Afghanistan and go for somewhere safe" in an interview with The Associated Press. The members who have left Afghanistan participated in an online robotics competition in September and plan to continue their education.

A documentary film titled Afghan Dreamers, produced by Beth Murphy and directed by David Greenwald, was in post-production when the team began to evacuate.

== 2022 ==
The Afghan Dreamers were involved in a training program at the Texas A&M University at Qatar’s STEM Hub.

== 2023 ==
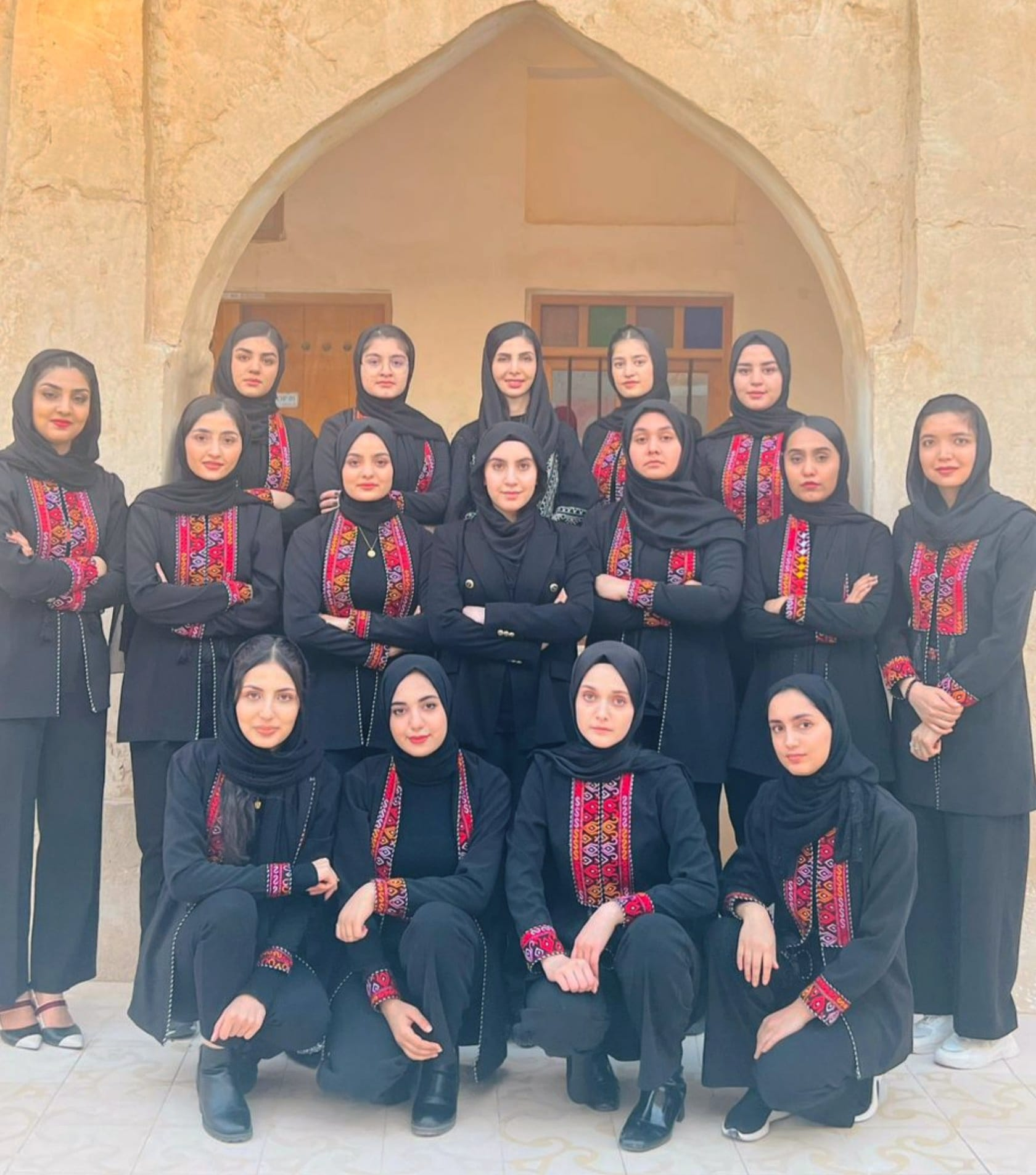
The Afghan Girls Robotics Team at the 5th UN Conference on the Least Developed Countries in 2023

The Afghan Girls Robotics Team had a booth at the 5th UN Conference on the Least Developed Countries, where they displayed some of the robots the team had constructed.

== Afghan Dreamers documentary ==
The Afghan Dreamers documentary from MTV Documentary Films premiered in May 2023 on Paramount+. The film was directed by David Greenwald and produced by David Cowan and Beth Murphy. In a review for Screen Daily, Wendy Ide wrote, "This film, with its likeable cast of girl nerds and positive message, should enjoy a warm reception on the festival circuit, and will be of particular interest to events seeking to showcase women's stories from around the world. It also serves as a timely cautionary tale – a case study on just how quickly the rights and the opportunities of women can be curtailed, at the behest of the men in power."

== Honors and awards ==
- 2017 Silver medal for Courageous Achievement at the FIRST Global Challenge, science and technology
- 2017 Benefiting Humanity in AI Award at World Summit AI
- 2017 Winner, Entrepreneurship Challenge at Robotex in Estonia
- 2018 Permission to Dream Award, Raw Film Festival
- 2018 Conrad Innovation Challenge, Raw Film Festival
- 2018 Rookie All Star – District Championship, Canada
- 2018 Asia Game Changer Award Honoree
- 2019 Inspiring in Engineering Award – FIRST Detroit World Championship
- 2019 Asia Game Changer Award of California
- 2019 Safety Award – FIRST Global, Dubai
- 2021 Forbes 30 Under 30 Asia
- 2022 World Championships, Genoa, Switzerland
