= Somaya =

Somaya is a surname and a given name. Notable people with the name include:

Given name:

- Somaya Bousaid (born 1980), Tunisian Paralympian athlete
- Somaya Faruqi (born 2002), Afghan student, engineer, captain of the Afghan Girls Robotics Team
- Shilpi Somaya Gowda, award-winning bestselling Canadian author
- Somaya Al Jowder (born 1960), Bahraini physician and politician
- Somaya El Khashab (born 1966), Egyptian actress and singer
- Somaya Ramadan (1951–2024), Egyptian academic, translator and writer

Surname:

- Brinda Somaya (born 1949), Indian architect and urban conservationist
- M. M. Somaya (born 1959), Indian field hockey player
