= List Project =

American nonprofit organization

- Formation: 20 June 2007
- Type: non-profit
- Website: www.thelistproject.org

The List Project is a non-profit foundation that was established on June 20, 2007. It assisted Iraqi refugees who worked for U.S-affiliated organizations throughout the Iraq War in obtaining visas and relocating to the U.S. It is recognized as a U.S. 501(c)(3) non-profit organization under the Tides Center.

== Background ==
The founder Kirk W. Johnson was a "former USAID worker who served as regional coordinator on reconstruction in Fallujah throughout 2005." After being contacted by an Iraqi colleague with whom he served, Johnson wrote an article in the Los Angeles Times lamenting the delays in visa handling for these interpreters. This article resulted in a surge of letters from other Iraqi interpreters and prompted the creation of the List Project.

Johnson and the List Project were the subjects of the 2012 documentary film The List, directed and produced by Beth Murphy.
