= Francesco Rulli =

Italian fashion designer & Artificial Intelligence Creator

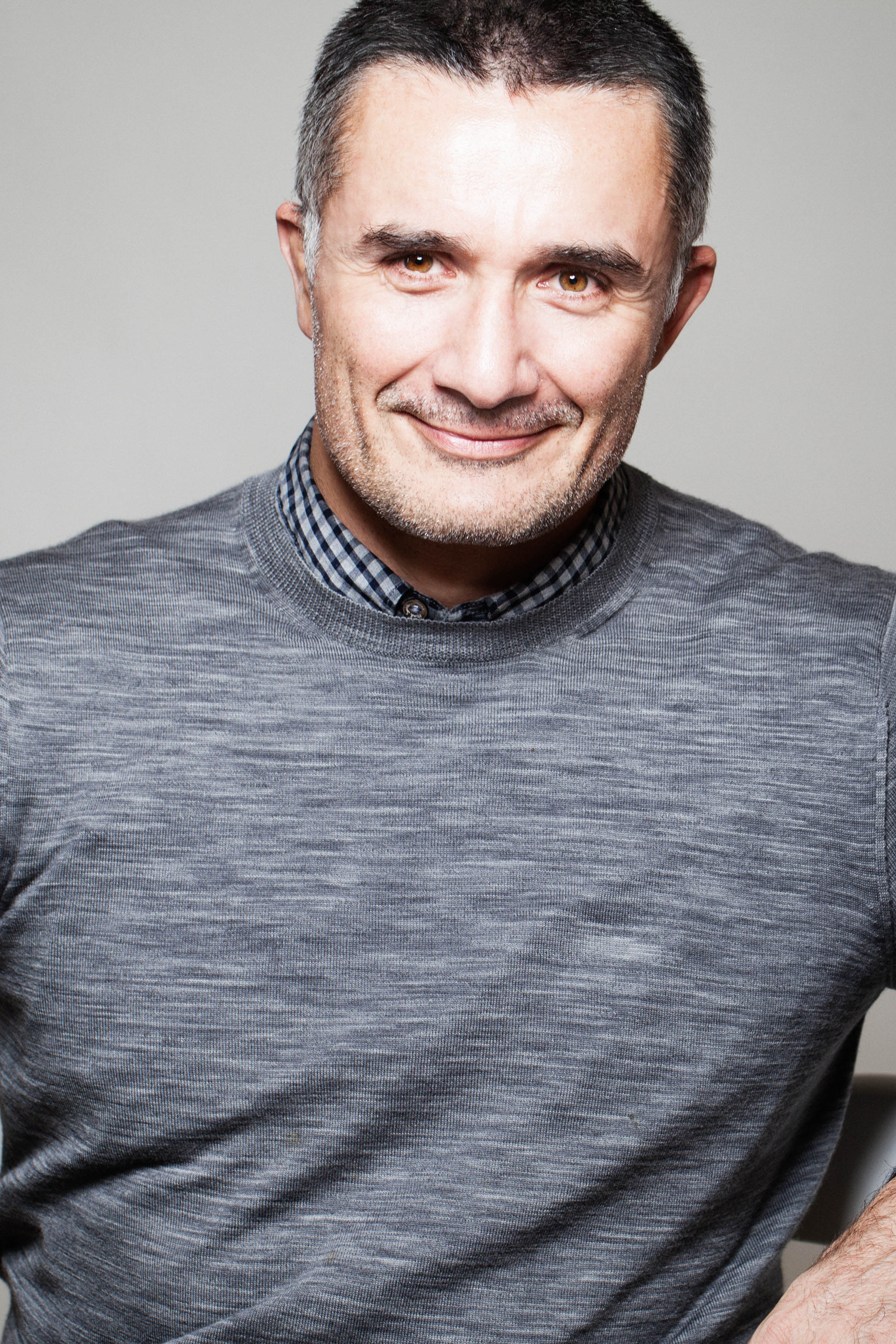
- Born: Florence, Italy
- Occupation: Businessman
- Known for: Founder and President of Film Annex; fashion business partner to John Malkovich; Managing Partner at Citadel of New York; Advisory Board Member Global Medical Relief Fund

Francesco Rulli is an Italian businessman, philanthropist and black belt Judo instructor at the New York Athletic Club. He founded MTI USA Inc. in 1995 and serves as the President. In 2006, he founded and served as the president of Film Annex, an online independent film distribution platform and web television network. He launched the Bitcoin platform bitLanders in 2014 and serves as the President. Rulli also co-founded Mrs. Mudd, a fashion and design consulting firm with American actor, producer and director John Malkovich. Rulli was a featured actor in Malkovich's documentary Flipping Uncle Kimono.

== Career ==
In 2001, Rulli met Malkovich in New York through mutual friend and then ambassador Muhamed Sacirbey, and asked Malkovich if he would be interested in doing a men's clothing line. In 2002, they founded Mrs. Mudd, a fashion company selling outfits designed by Malkovich. The company released its John Malkovich menswear collection, "Uncle Kimono", in 2003 The line expressed the idiosyncratic tastes of Malkovich, with items such as the "Nervous Breakdown Jacket." Francesco Rulli is currently working in the field of Artificial Intelligence (AI). His company, Querlo is a well partnered company that is stretching its arms as it lets in business with Bitcoin, NFTs and currently the Dome of Florence.

=== Film Annex ===
Rulli founded Film Annex, a Web TV Network that allows filmmakers to create free Web TVs to present their work under specific domain names, in 2006. Film Annex helps filmmakers create a brand out of their name, company, or project, in an effort to avoid a "forward-slash mentality". The company's distribution of movies and web television aims to allow artists and filmmakers to fund their projects and promote their works with a shared advertising model. An editorial team approves the content of all films before release to ensure they are made by professionals.

- In May 2010, Film Annex launched www.AbelFerrara.com a new web TV site in partnership with American screenwriter and director Abel Ferrara. Abel Ferrara TV broadcasts Ferrara’s videos, including excerpts from his films, news about his latest projects, and interviews with the filmmaker and other members of his creative team.
- In November 2011, Film Annex became the online distributor for METAN Development Group to distribute Hello! Hollywood! to China, US, and Canada.
- On June 27, 2013, Film Annex partnered with Matthew Modine's production company Cinco Dedos Peliculas to re-release his short film, Jesus Was a Commie, among other projects.
- In 2013, Rulli was an early adopter of bitcoin for use as a medium to pay bloggers and video content contributors on the Film Annex, later bitLanders, platforms. This initiative directly benefited female students in Afghanistan where he spearheaded the building of classrooms with Roya Mahboob and became featured in the book, The Age of Cryptocurrency: How Bitcoin and the Blockchain Are Challenging the Global Economic Order.

=== Afghan Citadel Software Company ===
As another Film Annex project, in 2012, Rulli and Roya Mahboob, founder and CEO of the Afghan Citadel Software Company (ACSC), launched the Afghan Development Project and Women's Annex. The project aims to show the world positive developments in Afghanistan by broadcasting current event videos, interviews, and news clips as well as archival material directly from Afghan Youth Development. Mahboob supplied technology training to students in 40 schools with the help of Rulli, and said it is a chance for girls to broaden their horizons. Women's Annex is an educational and financing initiative that provides women with mentoring and monetizing options for any video content they post on social media, allowing them to find opportunities to begin filmmaking careers.

=== Querlo ===
In 2015, Rulli launched Querlo, a “conversational AI” platform dedicated to the creation of custom artificial intelligence solutions. A prominent project has been the creation of the Michelangelo AI, bringing Michelangelo back to life 457 years after the Renaissance masters passing. He has the role of Chief Digital and Cognitive Officer of the Opera di Santa Maria del Fiore and collaborated on this project with Monsignor Timothy Verdon, director of the Museum of the Opera di Santa Maria del Fiore.

== Judo ==
Rulli is a member of the New York Athletic Club's Judo Club, chaired by Kevin Earls and Owen Tunney, and he is a Yodan (4th degree black belt) as an active competitor in Judo. He is a coach of and helps run the NYAC’s Saturday morning program, which is organized for NYAC members’ children to receive exposure to and basic training in judo.

Rulli is the Producer of JudoArts.com. Film Annex and Rulli sponsored the 2013 New York Judo Open. Competition directors were Mel Appelbaum, Dr Arthur Canario, and John Walla. Film Annex has filmed the tournament and conducted interviews with the athletes since 2010.

As a supporter of Judo, Rulli and Malkovich presented an unconventional fashion show in the documentary "Flipping Uncle Kimono", using 20 Judo fighters as models during a Milan fashion show that looked like a championship Judo match with the fighters wearing men's suits from the Mrs. Mudd fashion line by Malkovich. They did this on a stage in a courtyard in Milan, in front of a live audience, and with Malkovich and Rulli directing the action.

== Philanthropy ==
Rulli's company Film Annex funded 2013 Time 100 honoree Roya Mahboob in the construction of 11 classrooms and 2 stand alone IT centers in Herat and Kabul, Afghanistan, connecting 55,000 female students to the World Wide Web. Rulli is an Advisory Board Member of the Global Medical Relief Fund, an organization working to bring aid to children injured or otherwise adversely affected by war, natural disaster or illness. He is a Founding Board Member of Digital Citizen Fund (previously Women's Annex). Rulli along with Porter Bibb and Alan McFarland are founding members of the Southampton Multimedia Center which serves as both a digital literacy educational and training facility for the local community.
