= Somaya Faruqi =

Afghan engineer

- Born: 2002 (age 23–24); Herat, Afghanistan
- Education: Missouri University of Science and Technology; Sacramento State University
- Occupations: Robotics engineer, student, activist
- Known for: Captain of the Afghan Girls Robotics Team
- Awards: BBC 100 Women (2020)

Somaya Faruqi (also spelled Farooqi) (born 2002) is an Afghan student and engineer, and the captain of the Afghan Girls Robotics Team, also known as the "Afghan Dreamers." She was named to the BBC's 100 Women in 2020 and was featured by UNICEF in 2020 as well as the UN Women Generation Equality campaign in 2021. During the COVID-19 pandemic in 2020, her team designed a prototype ventilator to help fight the coronavirus in Afghanistan.

== Early life and education ==
Faruqi was born in 2002 and is from Herat city, in western Afghanistan. As a child, she became interested in engineering by watching and working with her father in his car repair shop. Her mother had been unable to have a formal education past the age of ten, due to Taliban restrictions on the education of females. Faruqi has said, "I want to become an electronic engineer in the future, and I am blessed to have the full support of my mom and dad."

== Career ==
In 2017, at age 14, Faruqi was one of six members of the Afghan Girls Robotics Team, founded by Roya Mahboob, that traveled to the United States to participate in the international FIRST Global Challenge robotics competition. In 2018, the team trained in Canada, continued to travel in the United States for months and participate in competitions. After their United States visas expired, Faruqi participated in team competitions in Estonia and Istanbul.

By early 2020, at age 17, Faruqi became the captain of the Afghan Girls Robotics Team. The team met on a daily basis after school. In March 2020, the governor of Herat at the time, in response to the COVID-19 pandemic and a scarcity of ventilators, sought help with the design of low-cost ventilators, and the Afghan Girls Robotics Team was one of six teams contacted by the government. Using a design from MIT and with guidance from MIT engineers and Douglas Chin, a surgeon in California, the team developed a prototype with Toyota Corolla parts and a chain drive from a Honda motorcycle. Faruqi's father served as a driver for the team, picking them up from their homes and driving on side streets to avoid checkpoints to help them get to their workshop. UNICEF also supported the team with the acquisition of necessary parts during the three months they spent building the prototype that was completed in July 2020.

In December 2020, Minister of Industry and Commerce Nizar Ahmad Ghoryani donated funding and obtained land for a factory to produce the ventilators. Under the direction of their mentor Roya Mahboob, the CEO of Afghan Citadel Software Company, the Afghan Dreamers have also designed a UVC Robot for sanitization, and a Spray Robot for disinfection, both of which were approved by the Ministry of Health for production.

In early August 2021, Faruqi was quoted by Public Radio International about the future of Afghanistan, stating, "We don’t support any group over another but for us what’s important is that we be able to continue our work. Women in Afghanistan have made a lot of progress over the past two decades and this progress must be respected." On August 17, 2021, the Afghan Girls Robotics Team and their coaches were reported to be attempting to evacuate, but unable to obtain a flight out of Afghanistan, and it was reported that they asked Canada for assistance. As of August 19, 2021, it was reported that some members of the team and their coaches had evacuated to Qatar. By August 25, 2021, some members arrived in Mexico. On August 26, 2021, Faruqi was quoted by Reuters as stating, "We left Afghanistan for our education and one day we will come back and we will serve our people and our country."

== Honors and awards ==
- 2017 Silver medal for Courageous Achievement at the FIRST Global Challenge, science and technology
- Benefiting Humanity in AI award at World Summit AI
- Janet Ivey-Duensing's Permission to Dream Award at the Raw Science Film Festival
- 2018 Entrepreneurship Challenge at Robotex in Estonia
- 2020 BBC's 100 Women
- TEEN. GIRL. ACTIVIST. (UNICEF, October 9, 2020)
- 2021 Forbes 30 Under 30 Asia
- Inspiring girls to know: Four stories to celebrate girls in ICT (UN Women, April 21, 2021)
