= David Cowan =

David Cowan may refer to:

- David Cowan (cricketer) (born 1964), Scottish cricketer
- David Cowan (entrepreneur), U.S. venture capitalist and entrepreneur
- David Cowan (footballer, born 1982), English footballer
- David Cowan (footballer, born 1910), Scottish footballer
- David Cowan (politician) (1742–1808), Scottish naval officer and politician in Upper Canada
- David Tennant Cowan (1896–1983), British Indian Army officer

== See also ==
- David Cowan Dobson (1893–1980), Scottish portrait artist
- Dave Cowens (born 1948), American basketball player
