= Rulli (surname) =

Rulli is an Italian surname. Notable people with the surname include:

- Francesco Rulli, Italian businessman, philanthropist and judo instructor
- Gerónimo Rulli (born 1992), Argentine football goalkeeper
- Giulia Rulli (born 1991), Italian basketball player
- Juan Carlos Rulli (born 1937), Argentine retired footballer
- Lino Rulli (born 1971), American radio host, author, producer, and television host
- Michael Rulli (born 1969), United States Representative from Ohio's 6th district
- Sebastián Rulli (born 1975), Argentine actor and model
- Stefano Rulli (born 1949), Italian screenwriter
- Tina Rulli, American philosopher
