= Beyond the 11th =

Charity working in Afghanistan

Beyond the 11th is a charitable foundation that supports widows in Afghanistan affected by war and terrorism. The organization makes grants to programs run by NGOs (non-governmental organizations) already working in the country, such as CARE, Women for Women International, and Arzu. These programs help Afghan widows become self-sufficient through job skills training, literacy classes and small business development.

The foundation was formed in 2003 by Susan Retik and Patti Quigley, two women who were widowed by the September 11th attacks. Both were pregnant at the time of their husbands' deaths and became close friends in the aftermath of their tragedies. Inspired by the outpouring of support they had each received from friends, family and strangers, the two women decided to they wanted to help widows in Afghanistan rebuild their lives after decades of war and oppression.

In May 2006, Retik and Quigley traveled to Kabul to meet the women they had been supporting in person. In December 2005, Quigley stepped down from the organization to end her public role as a 9/11 widow, but she continues to focus on supporting Afghan widows and children as executive director of Razia's Ray of Hope, which funds the Zabuli Education Center for girls and young women in Afghanistan.

For her work in the organization, Susan Retik was awarded the 2010 President's Citizens Medal, one of the United States' highest civilian honors.

== Documentary film ==
Quigley and Retik's work establishing Beyond the 11th and their trip to Afghanistan are the subject of the feature documentary Beyond Belief, directed by Beth Murphy. The film premiered at the 2007 Tribeca Film Festival.

== Awards ==
Susan Retik accepted the Presidential Citizenship Award in 2010 from President Barack Obama for her work and efforts in Afghanistan. Susan was nominated by Kumu Gupta who was deeply impacted on Susan's journey, after seeing the movie "Beyond Belief" and meeting Susan.
