= Kirk W. Johnson =

American writer

Kirk Wallace Johnson
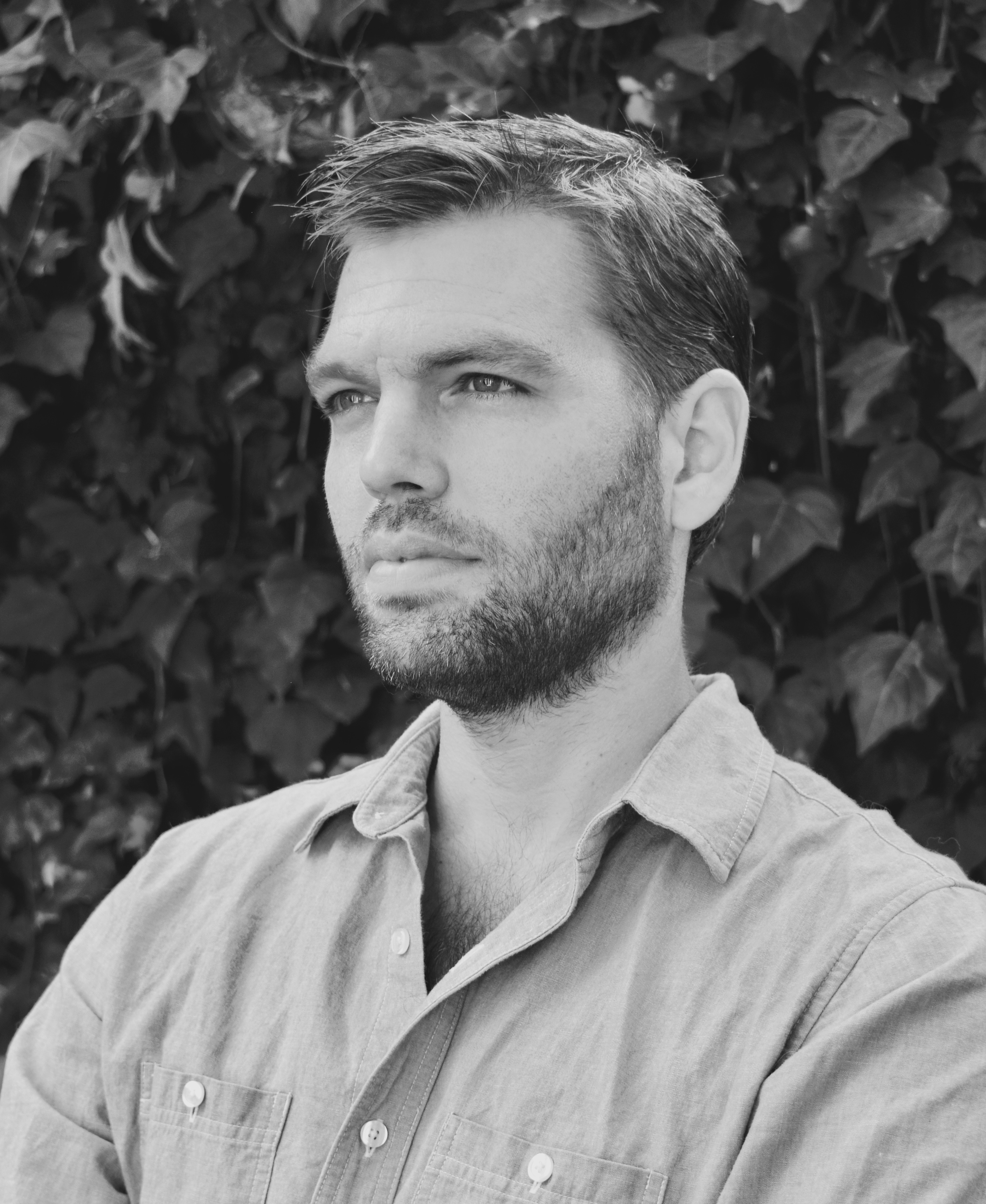
- Photo by Marie-Josée Cantin Johnson
- Born: West Chicago, Illinois
- Education: University of Chicago (2002)
- Occupations: Author, Screenwriter
- Spouse: Marie-Josée Cantin Johnson
- Children: 2
- Writing career
- Genre: non-fiction
- Notable works: The Feather Thief, The Fishermen and the Dragon, To Be a Friend is Fatal
- Website: kirkwjohnson.com

Kirk Wallace Johnson is an American author, screenwriter, and founder of the List Project, a not-for-profit organization that resettled Iraqi refugees who previously worked for the U.S. government during the Iraq War.

== Early life ==
Johnson was born in West Chicago, Illinois. He served as the U.S. Agency for International Development first coordinator for reconstruction in Fallujah, Iraq in 2005.

== List Project ==
Johnson was opposed to the Iraq War but felt an ethical obligation to help with the reconstruction efforts, which he supported as a way of righting a wrong. After returning from Iraq with PTSD, he was contacted by his former Iraqi colleagues, who were running for their lives as a result of working for the U.S. Government during the war. In December 2006, he wrote an op-ed for the Los Angeles Times calling upon the government to open its doors to these allies. In response, he was flooded with petitions from thousands of refugees, leading him to found the List Project to Resettle Iraqi Allies, a non-profit that marshaled hundreds of attorneys from the nation's top law firms to represent their cases on a pro bono basis.

Johnson and the List Project were the subjects of the 2012 documentary film The List, directed and produced by Beth Murphy.

== Literary career ==
After returning from Iraq, Johnson began fly-fishing, which led him to the story that would become his true crime book, The Feather Thief. The story is about how an American flutist, Edwin Rist stole remains of rare birds from the Natural History Museum in England. Hobbyists pay high prices for the feathers of exotic birds, including fly-fishers, who use them to catch fish. He learned of the heist when a guide from New Mexico told the story, leading to a five-year period of research and interviews, including with Rist. The Feather Thief made numerous lists, including Oprah Winfrey's 20 Best True Crime Books of All Time, Outside's Books that Shaped the Last Decade, and Good Housekeeping's 25 Best True Crime Books of All Time. Additionally, it was listed as one of the best books of 2018 by BuzzFeed News, Popular Mechanics, Forbes, Mental Floss, the American Birding Association, BookPage, and BookRiot.

The Fishermen and the Dragon won the Carr P. Collins Award for Best Book of Nonfiction, the Friends of American Writers 2023 Literature Award, and was the selection for the 2023 Gulf Coast Reads Program. It was listed as one of the best books of 2022 by The Texas Observer' and the New York Public Library.

== Screenwriting career ==
Johnson is adapting The Feather Thief into a television series with Universal International Studios and Jenna Bush Hager. Last Flight, a feature about an Afghan man trying to escape Afghanistan with the help of Johnson, is currently in development with Babak Anvari directing and Benedict Cumberbatch starring as Johnson. The rights to The Fishermen and the Dragon were sold to George Clooney's production company for a multi-part series.

== Anthropic AI lawsuit ==
In 2024, Johnson was one of three lead plaintiffs (with Andrea Bartz and Charles Graeber) to bring what became the largest class action lawsuit for IP infringement in U.S. history on behalf of tens of thousands of authors whose works were pirated by Anthropic AI in the development of their LLMs. The subsequent settlement of $1.5B is the largest recovery in the history of U.S. copyright cases.

== Bibliography ==
- To Be a Friend Is Fatal: The Fight to Save the Iraqis America Left Behind. Scribner. October 7, 2014. ISBN 9781476710495.
- The Feather Thief: Beauty, Obsession, and the Natural History Heist of the Century. Viking Books. 2018.
- The Fishermen and the Dragon. Viking Books. August 2, 2022. ISBN 9781984880123.
