= Josef Buchmann =

Josef Buchmann (10 July 1930 – 19 September 2026) was a German-Israeli real estate businessman, philanthropist and Holocaust survivor. A recipient of the Order of Merit of the Republic of Poland, he was the co-founder of the Buchmann-Mehta School of Music.

Buchmann died on 19 September 2026, at the age of 96.
