= Mel Appelbaum =

Mel Appelbaum (1940–2016) was an IJF Level A referee in the Sport of Judo and 8th Dan in Judo. Appelbaum also served as a writer and editor for Black Belt Magazine.

== Personal life ==
Appelbaum was born in the Bronx in 1940, but raised in Queens. He attended Martin Van Buren High School and Indiana Tech, and went to St. John's University for his master's degree in Mathematics. Appelbaum earned his doctorate from Poly Tech / NYU He was an active member of the Morristown Jewish Center.

== Professional life ==
Appelbaum was the owner of a US Patent "Fire Prevention Systems and Methods – A system or method that has an air distribution system configured to provide nitrogen into a room to reduce an oxygen concentration level within the room below a desired oxygen concentration level such that the atmosphere in the room fails to provide sufficient oxygen to sustain combustion". He is also the owner of several other patents related to Fire Prevention Systems. Appelbaum wrote numerous academic articles including "A heuristic method for estimating time-series models for forecasting" which was under "Applied Mathematics and Computation".

== Judo career ==
Appelbaum founded the Indiana Tech Judo Club in 1962. While there, he won the state Judo championship twice. Appelbaum was a national medalist in the United States in Judo. He beat national competitors such as Odell Terry. Appelbaum was the National Collegiate Judo Champion. He competed in the 1964 Olympic Trials, losing in the final match to eventual Olympian once to Senator and Governor Ben Campbell. Mel served as a chairman for the New York Open along with Arthur Canario.

== Judo referee ==
Mel served as the Chairman of the USA Judo Referee Commission. Mel eventually referred at the 1992 Barcelona Olympics and the 1996 Atlanta Olympics. He was also a referee at the 1996 Paralympic Games. Mel also referred at the World Championships and Pan Am Games. Mel was instrumental in bringing for the first US Olympic Women's Judo Team. Mel received an 8th degree Black Belt in Judo.

== See also ==
World Judo Championships
