= Evren Celimli =

- Born: May 2, 1971 (age 55); New York City
- Genres: Concert music, film music, electronic music
- Occupations: Writer, Poet, Composer, Sound Designer, Producer, Musician
- Instruments: Violin, Piano, Computer
- Years active: 1991–present

Evren Celimli (born May 2, 1971) is an American writer, composer, and producer of music for modern dance, theater, film and the concert hall. His music has been heard throughout the U.S. and Europe at music festivals, in theaters and film festivals.

== Biography ==
Evren began violin lessons in grade school and took music theory, piano, and composition lessons at the New England Conservatory extension school at 11 years old. He graduated from Brandeis University in 1993, where he studied with Eric Chasalow and received a master's degree from Sussex University, where he studied with Michael Finnissy.

Evren graduated with an additional master's degree from Harvard Extension University, Cambridge, Massachusetts on 29 May 2026. It was Harvard University's 374th Commencement and there were more than 9,000 degree candidates participating in the ceremonies. The presiding individual was the Harvard President Alan Garber and Kareem Abdul-Jabbar, the Basketball Hall of Famer and social justice champion was the honorary speaker at these graduation ceremonies. .

Evren wrote the soundtrack to Beyond Belief (2007), a film that follows two widows of the September 11, 2001 attack on the World Trade Center in New York City.

He worked with many New York City based choreographers, including Ben Munisteri, Doug Elkins, and Murray Spalding, for whom he was composer-in-residence. Evren received the Stockhausen Prize from Sussex University and First Prize from the Harvard Musical Association as well as the Reiner Composition Prize from Brandeis University two years in a row.

Evren is also a writer. He had a poem published in issue #24 of The Quarterly and an essay about collaborating with choreographers in Ballet Review.
