= Eric Chasalow =

American composer

Eric David Chasalow (born 1955) is an American composer of acoustic and electronic music. He is currently chair of the Brandeis University Department of Music, and the Director of BEAMS, the Brandeis Electro-Acoustic Music Studio.

== Biography ==
He was born in Newark, New Jersey on May 25, 1955 and was trained in music and biology at Bates College, Maine, where he was awarded a B.A. in 1977. He enrolled at the New England Conservatory of Music in Boston in 1975–76 to study composition. Between 1977 and 1985 he studied at Columbia University, earning the Doctor of Musical Arts in 1985 studying under Mario Davidovsky and the flute under Harvey Sollberger.

He served as executive director of the Guild of Composers from 1980 to 1985 and of the Music Alliance in New York from 1988 to 1990. In 1983 he held a National Endowment for the Arts composer’s fellowship, in 1984, 1986, and 1998 Norlin/MacDowell fellowships, and in 1986-87 the Charles Ives fellowship of the American Academy of Arts and Letters and a Guggenheim fellowship. In 1989 and 1994 he awarded prizes by the International Society for Contemporary Music (ISCM).

In 1990 he joined the faculty of Brandeis University, serving as the chair of the music department in 1996 and again in 2023. He served as Dean for the Graduate School of Arts and Sciences at Brandeis from 2014-2021.

His music is published by G. Schirmer, McGinnis & Marx (New York) and Edition Bim (Bulle, Switzerland) and appears on CDs from New World Records, ICMC.

== Selected works ==
INSTRUMENT AND TAPE

Shatter and Glide (2012-13) string trio and tape. Network for New Music commission (11:00)

I’m Just Sayin’ (2012) for string quartet and tape. Lydian String Quartet commission (5:00)

Incident and Scatter… (2012) for flute, clarinet, violin, ‘cello, percussion, piano and tape. Barlow commission for Talea (18:00)

On That Swirl of Ending Dust (2011) for flute, clarinet, violin, ‘cello, percussion, piano and tape. CMA commission for NY New Music Ensemble (20:00)

Are You Radioactive, Pal? (2010) alto saxophone and tape (13:00)

Scuffle and Snap (2010) violin and tape (5:30)

The Fundamental Object (2004) viola and tape. David Bursack commissioned (5:00)

Trois Espaces du Son (2004) piano, percussion, tape. Miroglio-Aprodu duo commission (11:04)

Due (Cinta)mani (2002) piano and tape. Vicki Ray commission for PianoSphere (7:15)

What is Danced…(and what is not) (2002) harp and tape. Lucia Bova commission (7:25)

In a Manner of Speaking (2000) bass clarinet and tape. Guido Arbonelli commission (5:00)

Suspicious Motives (1999) flute, clarinet, violin, ‘cello, tape. Boston Musica Viva commission (7:58)

‘Scuse Me (1998) electric guitar and tape. Tim Brady commission (5:40)

Out of Joint (1994) trumpet and tape. Nuova Consonanza commission for Mauro Maur (5:25)

Fast Forward (1988) two percussion and tape. Amy Knoles commission (6:35)

Over The Edge (1986) flute and tape (6:04)

The Furies (1984) soprano and tape. on poems by Anne Sexton (13:15)

Hanging in the Balance (1983) 'cello and tape. for Fred Sherry. NEA commission (6:31)

ORCHESTRA

Horn Concerto (2008-09). Horn and chamber orchestra. For Bruno Schneider (14:00)

Concerning Sunspots (2004), Fromm commission for Boston Modern Orchestra Project (14:00)

Dream Songs (2001) orchestra and tape. on five poems of John Berryman. Boston Modern Orchestra Project commission (15:00)

CHAMBER MUSIC

Second Quartet (2019) spatially distributed string quartet, for the Lydian Quartet and the Rose Museum (1 hour)

Second Quartet (2019) concert hall version. string quartet, for the Lydian Quartet and the Rose Museum (15:00)

The Nothing That Is (2018) three poems by Wallace Stevens, recomposed for solo cellist who speaks and sings (14:00)

The Nothing That Is (2017-18) three poems by Wallace Stevens, soprano and guitar (14:00)

String Sextet (2009) Portland Chamber Music Festival commission (16:00)

Flute Concerto (Three Love Poems) (2005), Flute solo, clarinet, violin, ‘cello, percussion, piano. Koussevitzky Music Foundation commission (15:00)

Fourth of Nature (2004) marimba duo. Stephen Paysen and Dominic Donato commission (4:00)

Lo Schermo (2002) flute, violin, piano. David Macculi commission (3:30)

Yes, I Really Did (1998) piano trio (7:30)

To The Edge and Back (1997) flute and piano. Pappoutsaki Flute Competition commission. (6:40)

In The Works (1993) flute, clarinet, violin, ‘cello, percussion, piano. Fromm Foundation commission (15:00)

First Quartet (1989-90) string quartet. (21:00)

Two from Three (1980) piano trio (10:00)

VOICE

Ghosts of Our Former Selves (2019-20) ten texts by E Chasalow - version for fixed media and for live performance (1 hour)

Ghost Songs (2019) songs about identity on texts by E Chasalow for mezzo-soprano, clarinet, piano (currently 10:00, additional songs being composed)

Where it Finds Nothing But the Wind (2013) ten texts from the Dead Sea Scrolls. for soprano, flute, guitar, percussion, electronics (30:00)

Five Simic Songs (1998) sop and string quartet. five songs on poems of Charles Simic. For the 50th anniversary of Brandeis University (10:00)

Pass it On (1995) soprano and piano. on a poem by Rachel Hadas (3:30)

The Shampoo (1988) soprano and piano. on a poem by Elizabeth Bishop (3:00)

The Furies (1984) soprano and tape. on poems by Anne Sexton (13:15)

Triptych (1984) soprano and piano. three songs on poems by Elizabeth Bishop and Rachel Hadas (10:00)

SOLO

Ariel Fantasy (2017) text by William Shakespeare, monodrama for flute (5:00)

Preconditions Create the Event (2017) violin solo (20:00)

This Day Will Be (2015) flute solo. text by Eric Chasalow (4:00)

Winding Up (1989) horn solo. Bruno Schneider commission (5:30)

PIANO

A Solution in Search of a Problem (second piano sonata) (2015) (12:00)

If True, Then… (2014) (4:00)

As a Kind of Always (2014) (4:00)

A Loose Translation (first piano sonata) (1995 - 96) (11:00)

Groundwork (1984) (5:00)

CHORUS

Elegy and Observation, an environmental requiem (2016) twelve voices and electronics. MusicaTrieze commission (30:00)

Words (1980) SATB. four poems by Robert Creeley

OPERA

The Puzzle Master (2007), text by F.D. Reeve. One-hour opera for five singers, keyboard, electronics and video.

ELECTROACOUSTIC

Ghosts of Our Former Selves (2019-20) ten texts by E Chasalow (40:00)

Buchla Pieces (2018) fixed media (10:30)

As a Kind of Knowing (2014) 8.1 chanl, 4 chnl, or stereo fixed media. In three movements. (16:40)

Symphony of Popular Misconceptions (2008-10) 4 chnl or stereo fixed media. 3 mvts. may be programmed independently (11:39)

Into Your Ears (2004) In honor of Mario Davidovsky’s 70th birthday (4:01)

Museum in D (2004) for The Rose Museum. (5:13)

Wolpe Variations (2003) Commissioned by the Stefan Wolpe Society to mark the Wolpe Centennial (5:46)

Clapping Game (2002) Based on material from children at Charles Sumner Elementary School, Boston. A BMOP Project (3:00)

Crossing Boundaries (2000) Commissioned by Bates College (9:41)

Seven Variations on Three Spaces (1999) (11:00)

Portrait of The Artist (1997) the voice of John Lennon (4:43)

Left to His Own Devices (1996) the voice of Milton Babbitt (5:51)

And it flew upside-down (1994) Commissioned by the Watertown Cultural Council (3:11)

The Fury of Rainstorms (1992) on a poem by Anne Sexton (2:06)

This Way Out (1991) (4:32)

== Notable students ==
Travis Alford Talia Amar John Aylward Richard Beaudoin Richard Belcastro Mark Berger Lou Bunk Evren Celimli Victoria Cheah Richard Chowenhill Anthony Cornicello Allison Lirish Dean Giuseppe Desiato David Dominique Maxwell Dulaney Nathaniel Eschler Ashley Floyd Christian Gentry Derek Hurst Derek Jacoby Gleb Kanasevich Namhoon Matthew Kim Todd Kitchen Emily Koh Peter Van Zandt Lane Li Qi Mu-Xuan Lin Ting-Chun Lin Ying-Ting Lin John Mallia Chris Malloy Peter Swire Laurie San Martin Florie Namir Sam Nichols Seung-Won Oh James Praznik Jeremy Rapaport-Stein Jeff Roberts Jeremy Sagala Brian Sears Joseph Sowa Jeremy Spindler Roland Tec Chris Warren Craig Walsh Julia Werntz Yiguo Yan Michele Zaccagnini
