= Edwin Rist =

American flautist and fly-tyer (born 1987 or 1988)

- Born: 1987 or 1988 (age 37–38)
- Other name: Edwin Reinhard
- Occupations: Flautist; Fly-tyer
- Known for: Stealing 299 birds from the Natural History Museum at Tring

Edwin Rist, also known by the pseudonym Edwin Reinhard, is an American flautist, fly-tyer, and burglar known for stealing 299 rare or extinct bird specimens from the Natural History Museum at Tring, England, in 2009, in order to craft artificial flies.

== Early life ==
Edwin Rist was born to two Ivy League graduates in New York City. He was homeschooled, and his family moved to the Hudson Valley when he was young.

Rist became interested in flute-playing at a young age, and he won several competitions at age 10. After watching a documentary film about fly-tying as a child, he became obsessed with the art form. The first artificial flies that Rist crafted were made from feathers he took from his parents' pillows. He went on to participate in fly-tying events and quickly gained attention in the fly-tying community for his young age and skill level. After a mentor introduced him to flies from the Victorian era made from exotic bird feathers, he began seeking rare feathers for his craft. By the age of 15, Rist had connections with multiple zoos and aviaries that allowed him to cheaply collect rare feathers. He also published a book on fly-tying that was well-received by the hobby's community.

After being accepted into the Royal Academy of Music, Rist left his fly-tying supplies in the United States and moved to the United Kingdom. As a result of the 2008 financial crisis, he began to struggle financially and sought to reestablish his fly-tying influence overseas.

== Bird heist ==
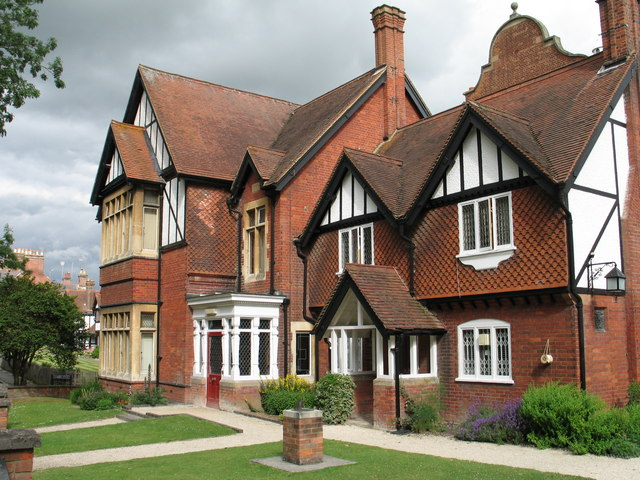
The Natural History Museum at Tring

In 2009, Rist visited the Natural History Museum at Tring's bird collection while posing as a professional photographer. He photographed birds that he planned to steal, as well as the hallways and locations of specimens, and entrance and exit points of the museum to plan a break-in. He planned his heist using a Microsoft Word document titled "PLAN FOR MUSEUM INVASION".

On June 23, 2009, he performed at a concert in London before taking a train to Tring. He then broke into the museum with a glass cutter, a large suitcase, and a pair of latex gloves. He stole 299 bird specimens, primarily brightly colored adult males. Specimens stolen included quetzals, cotingas, bowerbirds, house crows, and birds-of-paradise, including some that had been collected by Alfred Russel Wallace. The stolen birds were not noticed to be missing until a month after the theft. Rist was arrested in November 2010 and confessed to the burglary. Of the 299 stolen birds, 174 were found intact, but most had their identifying labels removed, which ruined their scientific value.

Rist admitted to having stolen the specimens for the purpose of crafting artificial flies. He additionally had illegally sold some of the feathers on eBay in order to use the money to purchase a golden flute. Clinical psychologist Simon Baron-Cohen diagnosed Rist with Asperger syndrome, arguing that an obsessional interest in the art of fly-tying made Rist unaware of the consequences of his actions. Additionally, his lawyer argued that the theft was a "James Bond fantasy". Due to his diagnosis, Rist was given a suspended sentence. Rist was ordered to pay £125,150 (equivalent to £193,323 in 2025), but faced no prison time.

Rist's bird heist served as the basis for the 2018 true crime book The Feather Thief by Kirk W. Johnson. It was announced in 2022 that a television adaptation of the book was being developed by Jenna Bush Hager alongside Universal International Studios.

== Later endeavors ==
After graduating from the Royal Academy of Music, Rist moved to Germany. There he started a YouTube channel under the pseudonym Edwin Reinhard, on which he posted heavy metal flute music videos. As of 2018 he continued to play the flute in orchestras in Germany.
