= The List (2012 film) =

- Directed by: Beth Murphy
- Produced by: Beth Murphy; Sean Flynn
- Cinematography: Kevin Belli
- Edited by: Kevin Belli
- Music by: John Califra
- Release date: April 21, 2012
- Running time: 83 minutes
- Country: United States
- Language: English

The List is a 2012 documentary film produced and directed by Beth Murphy. The film covers the attempts of Kirk W. Johnson to help Iraqis that face danger in their home country due to their collaboration with the United States during the Iraq War.

== Premise ==
The film focuses on Kirk W. Johnson and his List Project, a nonprofit organization seeking to bring help Iraqis that collaborated with the US during the Iraq War to the United States. It covers the dangers faced by Iraqi collaborators in their home country and Johnson's attempts to help them reach the United States.

== Production ==
Beth Murphy volunteered for the board of the International Institute of New England, which helps refugees resettle in Boston. The board expected an influx of Iraqi refugees in 2007 as American allies in Iraq started facing danger at home but were surprised when none arrived. She began investigating why allies in Iraq were unable to reach the United States and met Kirk W. Johnson and learned about his List Project. Filming took place in Chicago, Iraq, Syria, Jordan, and Egypt. The film only included interviews from subjects that had safely resettled in the United States afterwards in order to avoid endangering their lives in their home countries.

During the film's production, Murphy gave birth to her daughter and her father died in a car accident. The film debuted at the 2012 Tribeca Festival.
