= Talia Amar =

Israeli pianist and composer (born 1989)

Talia Amar טליה עמר
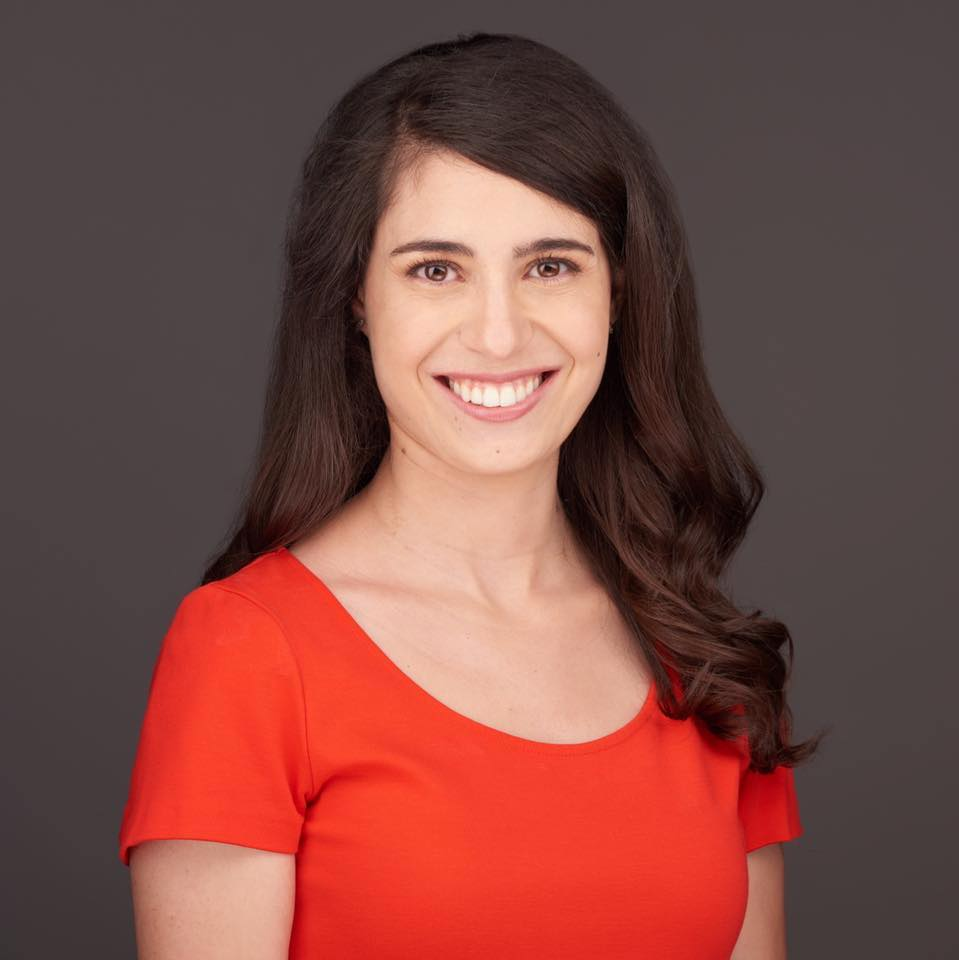

Background information
- Born: Jerusalem
- Genre: classical
- Occupations: pianist, composer, educator
- Instrument: piano
- Website: taliaamar.com

Talia Amar (Hebrew: טליה עמר; born 1989) is an Israeli composer and pianist. Since 2017, she has been a composition faculty member at the Jerusalem Academy of Music and Dance, where she serves as the Head of Innovation and Technology in Pedagogy. Many of her works focus on the connection between music and technology and their points of interaction.

== Biography ==
Amar was born in Jerusalem. Her mother and grandmother are piano teachers who immigrated to Israel from Paris. She began playing the piano at five, studying under Luisa Yoffe. She commenced composition studies at fourteen with composer Mark Kopytman.

== Career ==
From a young age, Amar participated in international competitions. At seven, she won the Shostakovich International Competition in Germany; at eleven, she secured first place in the International Piano Competition in Vicenza and the national competition in Paris.

Amar earned her Bachelor of Music with honors in composition from the Jerusalem Academy of Music and Dance, studying under professors Mark Kopytman, Ari Ben-Shabetai, and Yinam Leef. She also studied piano at the Buchmann-Mehta School of Music under prof. Emanuel Krasovsky. Between 2007 and 2013, she received scholarships from the America-Israel Cultural Foundation in piano and composition with distinction. In 2013, she won first place in the CIRCE composition competition in the United States. Pursuing advanced studies in the U.S., Amar obtained her Master of Music from the Mannes School of Music in New York, studying composition with Mario Davidovsky and piano with Victor Rosenbaum. She completed her Ph.D. at Brandeis University in Boston in 2020, where she learned with Yu-Hui Chang, Eric Chasalow and David Rakowski. Her doctoral dissertation, titled: "The Light, Path, and Voice: Underlying Processes in Voi(Rex) by Philippe Leroux" and an original composition Fractured Words, earned her the Herbert and Sandra Fisher ’56 Award for Exceptional Achievement in the Creative Arts in 2020. At Brandeis, she was awarded the Teaching Fellow Award for 2015–2016, 2016–2017, and 2017–2018 academic years.

Amar participated in France's Royaumont composition course in 2011, in a composers course at Wellesley College with Mario Davidovsky in 2016, and the IRCAM ManiFeste workshop in 2017. She was the composer fellow for the Collage New Music ensemble in Boston during the 2015–2016 season. With Collage, she featured her piece “Reminiscence,” for six players, described by prof. David Schulenberg: "The piece was beautifully crafted, its roughly ten minutes twice tracing an arc from relatively lively to quiet, sustained music, ending unexpectedly but very effectively with one of the latter passages. The players executed this with exquisite attention to the often subtle sonorities, which have something in common not only with Schoenberg’s Pierrot lunaire... but also with the Marteau sans maître by Boulez—whose recent death occasioned appreciative comments from all four composers. Amar... has a fine ear for sound as well as sure compositional technique, and I look forward to hearing more of her music."

As a pianist, she performed as a soloist in the United States, Israel, and France with the Orchestre Lamoureux at the Salle Gaveau in Paris, the Jerusalem Symphony Orchestra, the Ra'anana Symphonette, the Israel Chamber Orchestra, and the Israel Symphony Orchestra Rishon LeZion.

In 2011, her work took part in the North-South Consonance competition in New York. In 2014, her string quartet "Obsession" was chosen by Lorin Maazel for performance at the Castleton Festival. In 2017, she participated at the International Society for Contemporary Music Festival in Vancouver with her ensemble work. In 2018, she performed at the ACL Festival in Taiwan with her piece for flute and electronics. In 2019, she presented at the ECCO Festival in Brussels with her piano and electronics piece.

Her works have been performed at festivals in Israel and abroad, including Vox Femina, The New York Electroacoustic Music Festival, the Leonard Bernstein Festival of the Creative Arts, the New Music Edmonton Festival, CEME Festival, Castleton Festival, EAR Festival in London, Visible Sounds Congress and Renaud Capuçon's New Horizons Festival in France. In 2022, her piece "Labyrinth" was performed by Ensemble l'Itinéraire at the Présences Festival as part of Radio France. Her compositions have been performed in Australia, Italy, England, the United States, Belgium, Germany, the Philippines, Taiwan, Greece, Norway, France, Canada, Sweden, and Israel by various ensembles, including ICE International Contemporary Ensemble, Ensemble l'Itinéraire, Standing Wave, Yarn/Wire, Collage New Music, Lydian String Quartet, North/South Consonance Ensemble, Ensemble of the 21st Century, Les Cris de Paris, Atar Trio, Meitar Ensemble, Ensemble Recherche, Tel Aviv Soloists Ensemble, and Uroboros Ensemble. Michèle Tosi reviewed in ResMusica her piece "Reverberations," played by Meitar Ensemble: "The composer Talia Amar, barely thirty years old, brings together an instrumental ensemble and electronics in Reverberations, a piece she describes as "an echo of my previous works." The music immediately captivates with its powerful gestures and immersive world, enhanced by subtly integrated electronics that give it an orchestral scope. The writing is precise, featuring striking solos (bass, clarinet, bassoon) within a well-structured dramaturgy and skillful spatial control. A true revelation, carefully executed by Pierre-André Valade and the musicians."

Her piece "Metamorphosis" is included in the WAW CD, performed by flutist Ivona Glinka. WAW won the 2019 Clouzine Music Award for the Best Contemporary Classical Album. Her piece "Phantasmagoria" is featured on the 2015 Tangent Shores CD, performed by pianist Jay Jeffries. Her work "Ouroboros" is included in "A Leap Into the Dark" CD by Peter Katina.

Since 2017, Amar has been a faculty member at the Jerusalem Academy of Music and Dance, and a tenure member since 2020, where she serves as the Head of Innovation and Technology in Pedagogy. She is teaching at the Hebrew University of Jerusalem. She is also a council member of the Israeli Composers League. She performs electronic music with the Meitar Ensemble. She is an honorary member of the National Conservatoire in Greece.

== Personal life ==
Amar is married, a mother of three, and lives in Ra'anana.

== Awards ==
- 2009 - Gold Medal in the International Music Composition Award in Thessaloniki, Greece, for her composition Sparks for bassoon and marimba.
- 2010 - third place in the 8th Italian Percussion Competition for her piece Sparks for bassoon and marimba.
- 2011 - Special mention at the IBLA-Grand Music Competition in the United States for her composition Monologue for Two Pianos.
- 2012 - Klon Prize from the Israel Composers' League.
- 2013 - Third place at the Ear Festival in London, England, for her composition When a Dream Becomes Reality...
- 2016 - Rosenblum Prize for Performing Arts for Promising Young Artists, from Tel Aviv-Yafo Municipality.
- 2018 - Prime Minister's Award for Composers, from the Ministry of Culture and Sport (Israel).
- 2019 - ACUM Prize for Encouragement of the Work "Triangulation".
- 2023 - ACUM Prize in Memory of Menachem Avidom for Rage Contre La Lumière qui se Meurt, recognized as the year's composition.

== Notable works ==
- 2013 - "Obsession" for string quartet.
- 2014-2015 – "MutaMorphosis” for flute and electronics.
- 2015 – “Reminiscence” for ensemble.
- 2016 – “Deus Ex Machina” for a singer, double bass, and a phone.
- 2017-2018 - "Triangulation" for piano and electronics.
- 2018-2019 – “Reverberations” for ensemble and electronics.
- 2019 – “Fractured Words” for a singer, ensemble, and electronics.
- 2020 – “From the Chrysalis” for ensemble and electronics.
- 2021 - “Labyrinth” for ensemble and electronics.
- 2022 - “Rage Against the Dying Light” for two pianos and percussion.
- 2023 - “For Orchestra 1” for orchestra and large ensemble.
- 2024 - “Butterfly Hug” for voice, dancer, electric guitar, percussion, and electronics
- 2024 - “The Sea of Jerusalem” for narrator, piano, voice, percussion, and electronics.
