= Beyond Belief (2007 film) =

- Theatrical poster for Beyond Belief.
- Directed by: Beth Murphy
- Produced by: Beth Murphy
- Cinematography: Kevin Belli; Sean Flynn
- Edited by: Kevin Belli; Beth Murphy
- Music by: Evren Celimli
- Distributed by: Principle Pictures
- Release date: April 26, 2007
- Running time: 97 minutes
- Countries: United States; Afghanistan
- Languages: English; Dari

Beyond Belief is a feature documentary directed by Beth Murphy. The film follows Susan Retik and Patti Quigley, two women who lost their husbands on September 11, 2001, as they set up humanitarian programs for war widows in Afghanistan. It premiered at the 2007 Tribeca Film Festival.

On review aggregator website Rotten Tomatoes the film has an approval rating of 83% based on 12 critics, with an average rating of 6.9/10.

== Film credits ==
- Director: Beth Murphy
- Producer: Beth Murphy
- Associate Producer: Sean Flynn
- Editors: Kevin Belli, Beth Murphy
- Camera: Kevin Belli, Sean Flynn
- Music: Evren Celimli
- Translator: Luna Asrar
