= Buchmann-Mehta School of Music =

- בית הספר למוזיקה ע"ש בוכמן-מהטה
- Former names: Israel Conservatory and Academy of Music; Samuel Rubin Israel Academy of Music
- Type: Music college
- Established: 1945
- Parent institution: Tel Aviv University
- Director: Dr. Uri Binyamin Rom
- Honorary president: Zubin Mehta
- Location: Tel Aviv, Israel
- Website: en-arts.tau.ac.il/Music

The Buchmann-Mehta School of Music (BMSM) is an institute of higher education in Tel Aviv, Israel. The school is a part of the Faculty of the Arts of Tel Aviv University and is operated in collaboration with the Israel Philharmonic Orchestra (IPO). The school is named after German Jewish philanthropist Josef Buchmann and conductor Zubin Mehta, then music director of the IPO. Mehta is the honorary president of the school and has conducted the school's orchestra regularly in Israel and on tours abroad. The BMSM mission is to train elite young musicians in performance, composition and research in music and prepare them for professional careers in these fields. The BMSM's orchestral training program is an integral part of the school and aims to educate orchestral musicians to supply the artistic future of the IPO and other orchestras.

== History ==
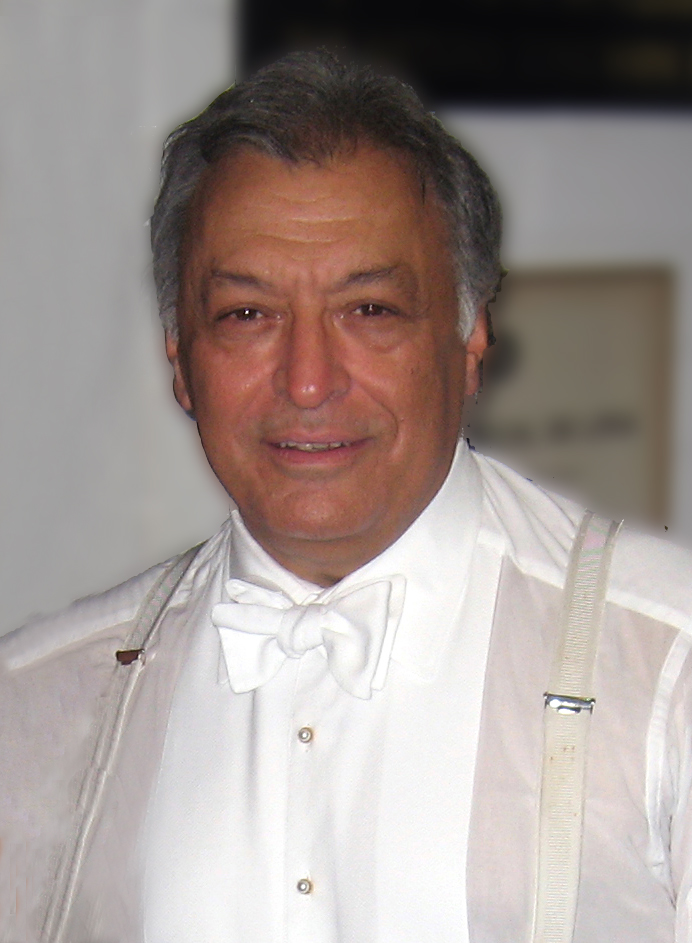
The school is named after philanthropist Josef Buchmann and conductor Zubin Mehta (pictured), who is the BMSM's honorary president.

The school's origins were as the Israel Conservatory and Academy of Music, founded in 1945 by senior members of the IPO (until 1948 named the Palestine Symphony Orchestra) who had fled Europe on the brink of World War II. In 1966 it was merged into the newly formed Tel Aviv University and in 1972 became a cornerstone for the university's Faculty of the Arts. The heads of the academy were among the founding fathers of the music world in Israel: violist and composer Ödön Pártos, pianist and conductor Arie Vardi, composers Yehezkel Braun, Yizhak Sadai and Joseph Dorfman, violinist Yair Kless and composers Ami Maayani and Noam Sheriff. The school's three honorary presidents were Arnold Schoenberg, Leonard Bernstein, and Zubin Mehta.

The Buchmann-Mehta School of Music was founded in March 2005 as a partnership between Tel Aviv University and the Israel Philharmonic. The school's foundation was made possible by the donation of Josef Buchmann and conductor Zubin Mehta, who has been actively involved in the school since its inception. The first director of the school and one of its founders was pianist and pedagogue Tomer Lev. In 2009 he was succeeded by conductor and bassoonist Zeev Dorman, who had served as the IPO's principal bassoon player as well as chairman of the orchestra's executive board for nearly 25 years. In August 2015 Lev resumed his post as head of the BMSM. In 2021, Lev was succeeded in the position by Dr. Uri Binyamin Rom.

== Academics ==
The school trains students in performing, singing, conducting, composition and theoretical research and grants B.A/B.Mus and M.A/M.Mus academic degrees as well as PhDs in musicology.

The school has a department of bow string instruments, keyboard instruments, wind instruments, vocal studies, composition, conducting, chamber music and musicology.

== International students program ==
The BMSM "Adler-Buchmann International Free Tuition Program offers students who come from outside of Israel tuition free-of-charge," and on a selective basis also living stipends and housing.

== Ensembles and orchestral training program ==
BMSM has "a full symphony orchestra, opera ensemble, oratorio choir, chamber choir, contemporary music ensemble and around 50 different other ensembles." Students in the school's orchestral training program have weekly sessions and sectional rehearsals with the principal players of the IPO.

The BMSM Symphony Orchestra serves as the cadet orchestra for the Israel Philharmonic and its members are coached by IPO's musicians. The orchestra performs in Israel and abroad.

== Campus and facilities ==
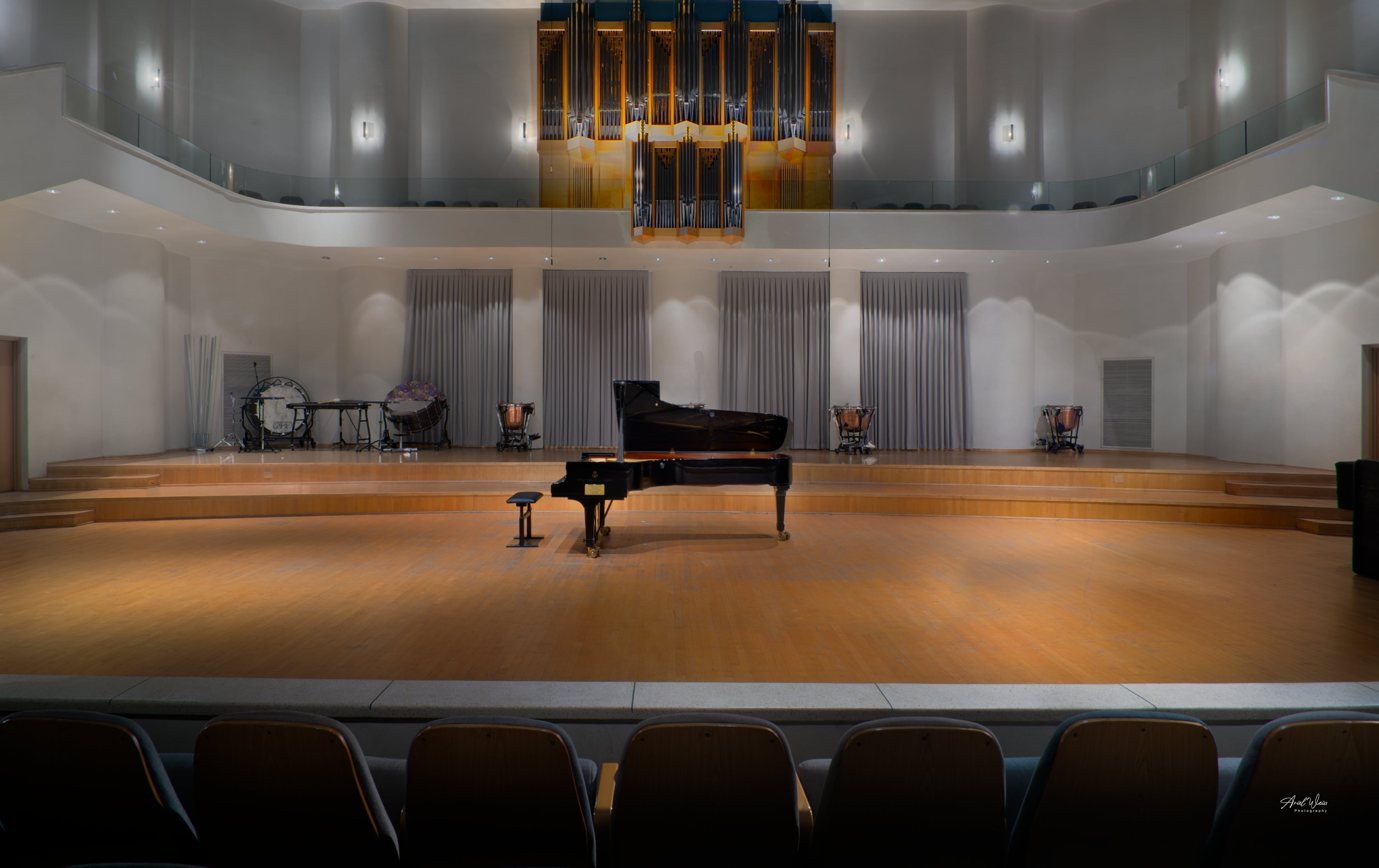
Clairmont Hall, at the Buchmann-Mehta School of Music

BMSM is based at the Ramat-Aviv campus of TAU. The school has three performance spaces and a recording studio. The 450-seat Clairmont Concert Hall, built in 1998, is the school's primary performance venue, followed by the 120-seat Targ Auditorium. Israeli composer, and former BMSM school director, Ami Maayani designed and supervised the building of Clairmont Concert Hall, both architecturally and acoustically.

== Notable faculty ==
Prominent faculty include:

- Josef Bardanashvili
- Sharon Rostorf-Zamir
- Dora Schwarzberg
- Hagai Shaham
- Arie Vardi
- Yoav Talmi
- Hillel Zori

== Notable students and alumni ==
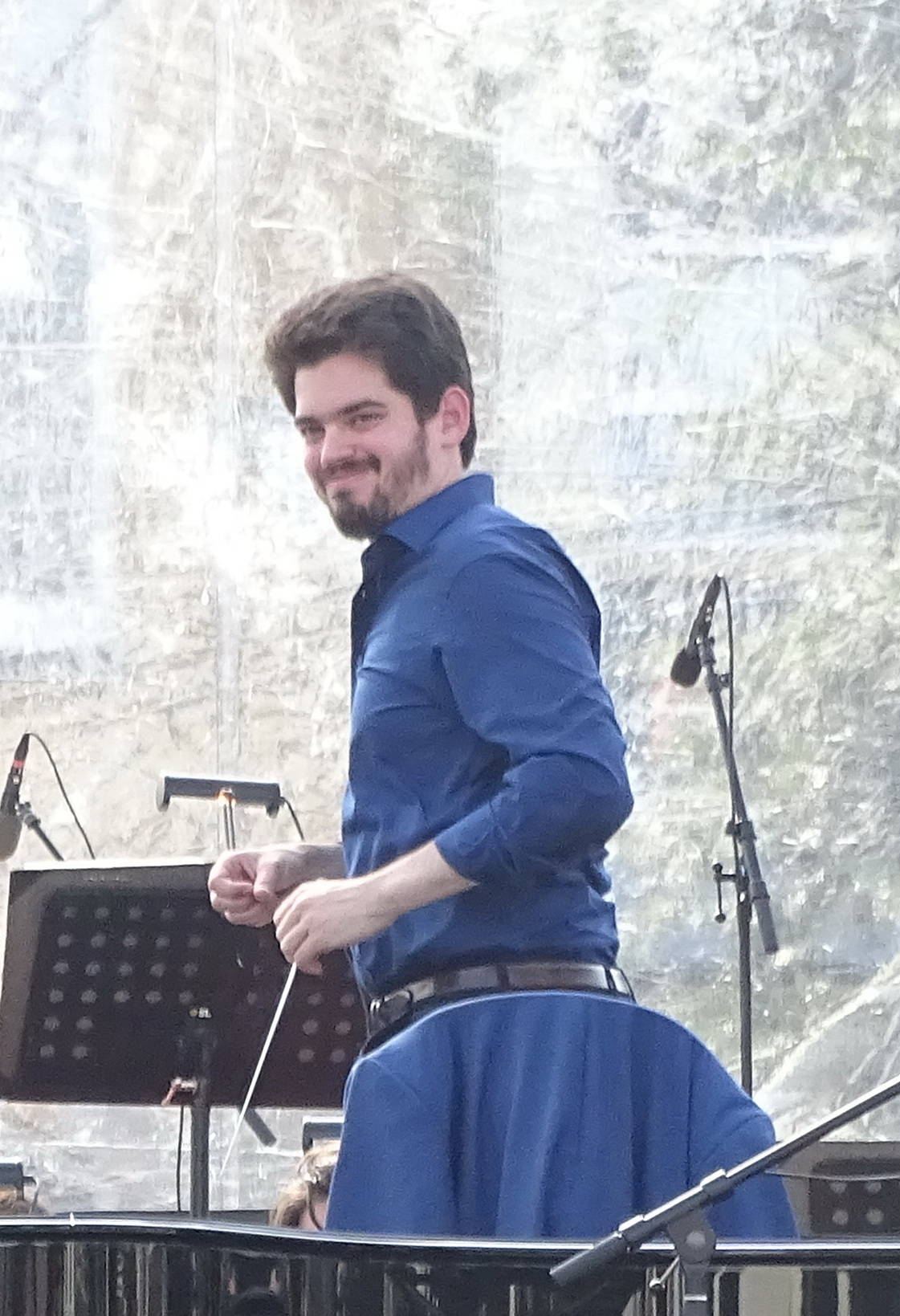
Conductor Lahav Shani, music director of the IPO and successor of Zubin Mehta.

- Itzhak Perlman, studied at the Israel Academy of Music under Rivka Goldgart
- Pinchas Zukerman, studied at the Israel Academy of Music from age eight
- Menahem Pressler, studied under Eliahu Rudiakov at the Israel Conservatory, the predecessor to the Israel Academy of Music
- Veda Kaplinsky, studied under Ilona Vincze-Krausz at the Israel Academy of Music
- Lahav Shani, music director of the IPO, successor of Zubin Mehta
- Boris Giltburg, Israeli classical pianist
- Talia Amar, Israeli Composer.
