= David Cowan (venture capitalist) =

American businessperson

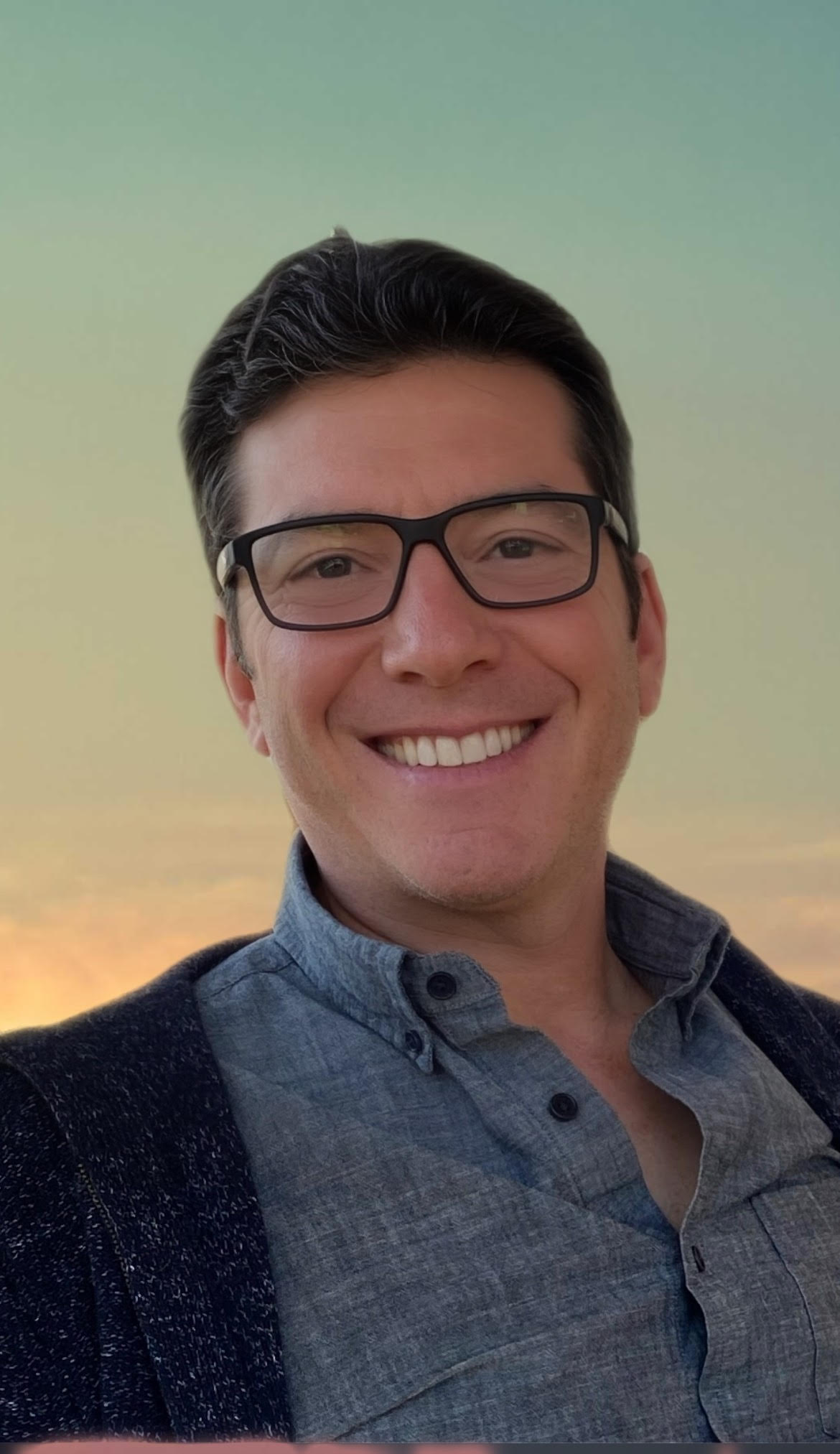
- David Cowan 2022
- Occupations: Venture Capitalist, Entrepreneur

David Cowan is a prominent Silicon Valley venture capitalist, Emmy-nominated filmmaker, philanthropist, and company founder. He is in the Forbes Midas List Hall of Fame and has appeared on the Midas List 14 times since 2001. He co-founded three companies, including Verisign. He has invested in more than 29 companies that have gone on to IPO. He is also noted for his support of scientific skepticism and of the work of Richard Dawkins and as of 2022 a board member of Center for Inquiry.

== Early life and education ==
Cowan was raised in New Rochelle, New York. He earned his undergraduate degree in Computer Science and Mathematics from Harvard University in 1988. He received his MBA from Harvard in 1992.

== Career ==
=== Venture capital and entrepreneurship ===
Cowan joined Bessemer Venture Partners in 1992. His notable investments there include LinkedIn, Qualys, Twitch, Twilio, Rocket Lab, Skybox Imaging, Blue Nile, Verisign, Ciena, LifeLock, Auth0, Zapier, Rigetti, Spire Global, and Anthropic. Of his investments, 29 have gone on to IPO. Bessemer was Twilio's largest shareholder at the time of its 2016 IPO, a stake worth over $500 million.

In 1995, Cowan co-founded network infrastructure company Verisign and served as its initial chairman. The company went public in 1998 and is currently traded on NASDAQ.

In 1996, Cowan co-founded mobile email software platform Visto, serving as its initial CEO. Visto later purchased Good Technology and the merged company was acquired by Blackberry in 2015.

In 2012, Cowan co-founded DDOS prevention firm Defense.Net. It was acquired by F5 Networks in 2014.

He served on the Board of Auth0, which was acquired by Okta for $6.5 billion; Bessemer owned greater than 20% of the company at that time, generating over $1.2 billion in gains for the firm.

=== Other professional activities ===
Cowan is the host of the Wish I Knew podcast, winner of the 2024 Webby Award for Best Business Podcast. The show aims to share the life-changing moments that founders, CEOs and leaders discovered along their business journeys and why taking risks leads to growth.

In 2006, Cowan published a blog post questioning claims made regarding the dietary supplement Airborne, which he alleged was improperly marketed as a cold remedy. Cowan's blog post became the primary source for a Scientific American article, which in turn led to a lawsuit against Airborne that caused significant marketing changes and a $23.5 million fine by the Federal Trade Commission.

Cowan holds several United States patents, including patents regarding consumer behavior (assigned to Groupon following the acquisition of MashLogic) and network security.

=== Professional awards and recognition ===
- Forbes Midas List Hall of Fame
- Forbes Midas List: Appeared 14 years between 2001 and 2018
- Forbes Midas List 2001 (inaugural list): #6 (tied)

== Creative Works ==
Cowan wrote and directed the musical “Lies in the Attic,” which was performed by a capella group Voices in Harmony four times in San Jose alongside other cast members. He co-wrote and starred in the Silicon Valley mockumentary “Bubbleproof,” which was produced by the Femtofilm project in 2017. Cowan was Executive Producer of the David Greenwald-directed documentary The Blech Effect, released in 2020.

Cowan was also the Producer of Afghan Dreamers, a documentary about five girls in Afghanistan who were part of the Afghan Girls Robotics Team, an internationally competitive robotics team. Afghan Dreamers won the Best Human Rights Film Award at Galway Film Fleadh, Best Documentary Audience Award at Valladolid, Best Inspirational Storytelling at Savannah Film Fest, and Honorable Mention for Best Documentary Feature at the 2022 Woodstock Film Festival. In 2022, it joined the MTV Documentary Films slate licensed by Paramount/Viacom. In 2023, it was announced that it would exclusively premiere on May 23 on Paramount+.

In 2026, Cowan received an Emmy Award nomination for Best Documentary Short as the producer of the film, "Heist."

== Philanthropy ==
Cowan founded the Afghan Rescue Fund, an organization that works to assist and relocate Afghan families and individuals imperiled by the upheaval in Afghanistan and the Taliban regime. Cowan himself has coordinated the rescue of hundreds of endangered Afghans to date.

Cowan previously served as a Trustee of the Richard Dawkins Foundation for Reason and Science before it merged with the Center for Inquiry. He serves as a board member of the merged organization. He also serves on the Advisory Board of the Center for Astrophysics | Harvard & Smithsonian as of 2022.

== Personal life ==
Cowan is the brother of former New York Times reporter Alison Leigh Cowan. He identifies as atheist.

== See also ==
- Bessemer Venture Partners
