= Somaya Al Jowder =

Bahraini politician

Somaya Abdulrahman Al Jowder (Arabic: سمية الجودر, born January 1, 1960) is a Bahraini physician and politician from a family in the Jubur tribe. Her family is one of the oldest and most prominent in the Kingdom, including many ministers, deputy ministers, assistant secretaries, business managers, and senior military officers, as well as theologians, imams, and poets. Members of the family also live in Kuwait and the United Arab Emirates, including Anwar bin Abdul Rahman Al-Jowder, former Assistant Secretary-General of the Cabinet of Kuwait. The family intermarried with native Arab families and tribes in Bahrain and throughout the Gulf states, especially the Saudi regions of Najd and the Eastern Province.

== Career ==
Al Jowder was born on January 1, 1960. She received her Bachelor of Medicine and Bachelor of Surgery from Ain Shams University in December 1982, a Doctor of Medicine in Family Medicine from American University of Beirut in September 1987, a Diploma in Clinical Psychiatry in June 1991 and Diploma in Medical Administration in December 1998 from the Royal College of Physicians of Ireland, and a training certification from the Academy of Human Resource Development in December 2004.

She worked as a family medicine consultant and psychologist, from which she was promoted to Chairwoman of the Board of Directors of Al-Naim Health Center in Manama, a post she held from March 1990 to May 2007. In 1999, she was appointed Director of the National Program to Combat Venereal Diseases and AIDS, followed by a post as Chair of the National Committee to Combat Acquired Immune Deficiency Syndrome starting in 2004.

In the 2011 Bahraini parliamentary by-elections, she won the first constituency in the Central Governorate with 1,725 votes for 51%, only 65 more votes than the runner-up, Al Wefaq candidate Osama Al Khaja. In the 2014 Bahraini general election, she lost the race for the tenth constituency in the Capital Governorate after winning 152 votes for 3.31% in the first round.
