= Natural History Museum at Tring =

Museum in Hertfordshire, England

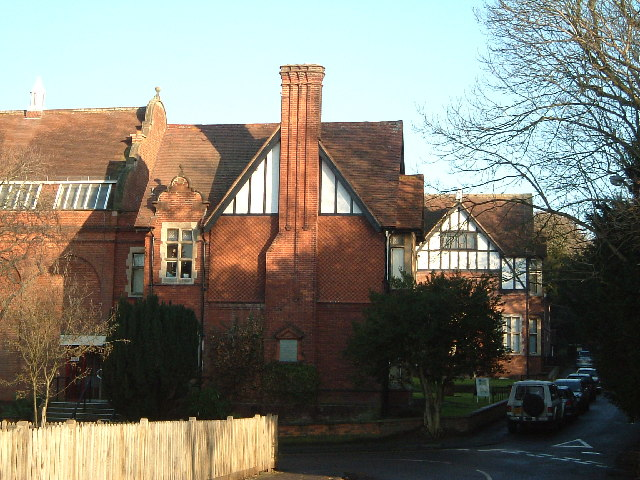
- View of the oldest part of the museum; there are extensive buildings to the rear and left.
- Established: 1889
- Location: Tring, Hertfordshire, United Kingdom
- Coordinates: 51.790833°N 0.661368°W
- Type: Mounted zoological specimens
- Collection size: At least 4000 objects
- Visitors: 151,787 (2019)
- Director: Michael Dixon
- Website: www.nhm.ac.uk/visit/tring.html

The Natural History Museum at Tring is the private museum of Lionel Walter, 2nd Baron Rothschild; today it is under the control of the Natural History Museum, London. It houses one of the finest collections of stuffed mammals, birds, reptiles and insects in the United Kingdom. It was known as the Walter Rothschild Zoological Museum until April 2007. The museum is located on Akeman Street, in Tring, Hertfordshire.

== History ==
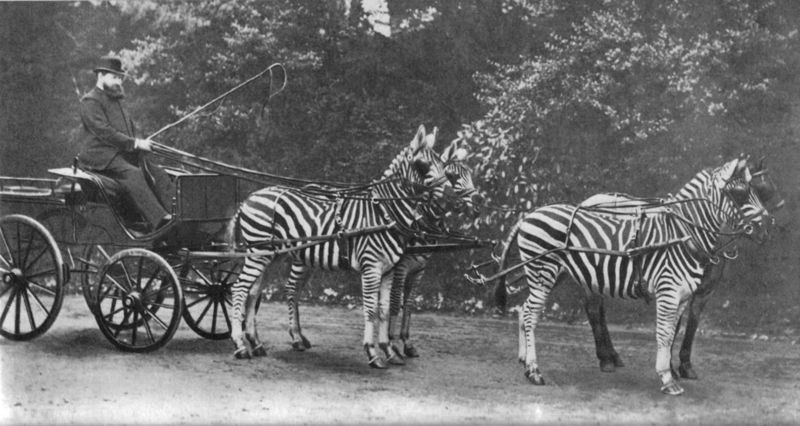
Walter Rothschild and zebra-drawn carriage

The Natural History Museum at Tring was once the private museum of Lionel Walter, 2nd Baron Rothschild, and is located on the grounds of the former Rothschild family home of Tring Park. The building was constructed in 1889 to house his collection of mounted specimens and first opened to the public in 1892. The Rothschild family gave the Museum and its contents to the nation in 1937. Lionel Walter bred hybrids between zebras and horses (zebroids) and a hybrid foal is on display. He was frequently seen riding a zebra-drawn carriage. The museum's Zebra Cafe alludes to Lord Rothschild's love of zebras and has photographs of his trained zebras harnessed to open carriages.

== Description ==
The extensive collection, housed in several rooms, includes extinct animals and birds such as the quagga, thylacine, great auk and reconstructions of the moa and dodo. Oddities include hybrids and examples of abnormal colouration. The dogs' display was relocated to the Rothschild Zoological Museum from the Natural History Museum, South Kensington, London after World War II. This shows how domestic dogs have changed shape due to selective breeding and includes the tiny Russian and Mexican lapdogs as well as famous racing greyhounds. The Museum has six galleries, each one of which houses a different set of animals. The first gallery contains birds, large carnivorans and primates, the second is used to show temporary exhibits, the third crocodilians, crustaceans, fishes, insects, large mammals and marine invertebrates, the fourth accommodates kangaroos and odd-toed ungulates, the fifth holds bovids, hippopotamuses, pigs and marine mammals, and finally the sixth gallery contains amphibians, bats, various British mammals, domestic dogs, ratites, lizards, snakes, turtles and small mammals. The Museum also contains a Discovery Room designed for young children, and the Rothschild Room, which is set out to recreate the surroundings that the Rothschild family would have worked in. It became part of the Natural History Museum in 1937 and changed its name to the Natural History Museum at Tring in April 2007.

The site is also home to the ornithological research collections (Bird Group, Department of Zoology) and the ornithological library (Department of Library and Information Services) of The Natural History Museum, but these are not open to the public. There are small special themed exhibitions throughout the year showcasing specimens not normally on display, and activities for youngsters.

On 7 September 2026, Historic England unveiled a blue plaque mounted on the exterior wall of the museum in honour of Welsh palaeontologist Dorothea Bate, who worked there as Officer in Charge from 1948- 1951. It is part of the National Blue Plaques Scheme.

== Thefts from museum ==
=== Bird skins ===
On 24 June 2009, a theft occurred from the museum involving the removal of 299 brightly coloured stuffed birds, mostly male trogons and quetzals from Central and South America, as well as birds of paradise from the island of New Guinea, some of which had been collected by Alfred Russel Wallace. The police announced on 12 November 2010 that a 22-year-old US citizen, Edwin Rist, had been arrested, in the Tring area, in connection with the theft and the majority of bird skins had been recovered. The story was featured almost a decade later on NPR's This American Life, "The Feather Heist". Rist pleaded guilty to the theft on 24 November 2010. He was sentenced to 12 months in jail, suspended for two years, and a supervision order in April 2011. The sentence was relatively low because Rist was diagnosed with Asperger syndrome. He was also required to repay £125,150, the estimated value of the stolen birds through the Proceeds of Crime Act. The police also advised that 191 intact bird skins had so far been recovered.

=== Rhinoceros horns ===
In the early hours of 27 August 2011, a thief broke in through the museum's front doors and removed the horns from two rhinoceros exhibits, one an Indian rhino and the other a white rhino, using what was believed to be a large hammer. However, in the light of recent thefts from other museums, three months before the break-in curators had replaced the real rhino horns, valued at £240,000, with resin replicas that had no commercial value. On 17 January 2012, Darren Bennett from Leicester was charged with the theft of two replica rhinoceros horns; real rhino horn can sell for £60,000 per kg in the Far East for its supposed medicinal qualities.

== Gallery ==
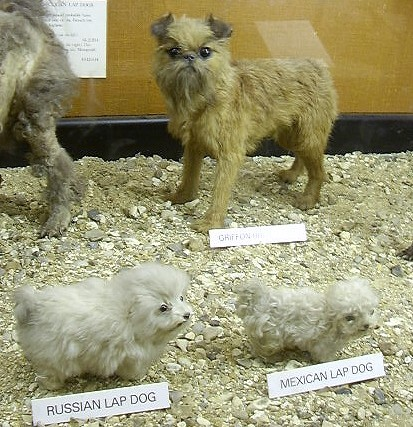
Russian and Mexican lapdog (immature)

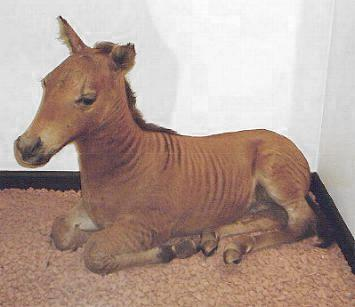
Zebra-horse hybrid foal

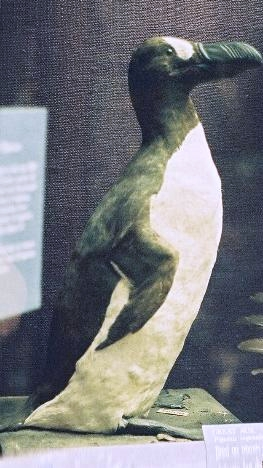
Great auk

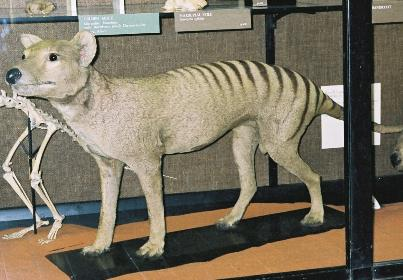
Tasmanian tiger or thylacine

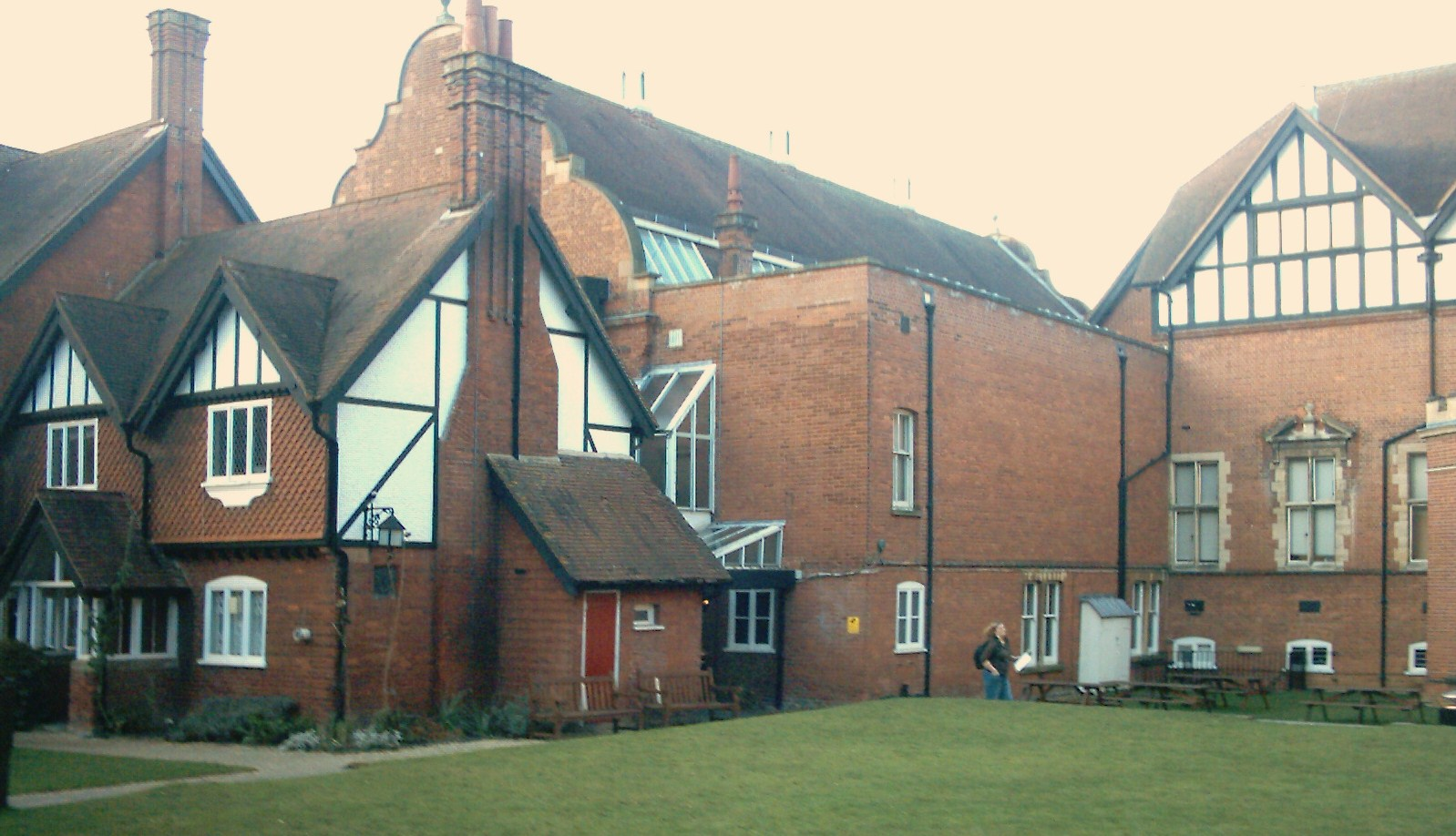
Side view of the museum (from Park Street)

== Bibliography ==
- More information about the collecting of animals can be found in the book Dear Lord Rothschild: Birds, Butterflies and History (ISBN 0-86689-019-X)
- More information about the Edwin Rist thefts can be found in the book The Feather Thief: Beauty, Obsession and the Natural History Heist of the Century by Kirk Wallace Johnson, and episode 654 of This American Life.
