= Roya Mahboob =

Afghan entrepreneur and businesswoman

Roya Mahboob رویا محبوب
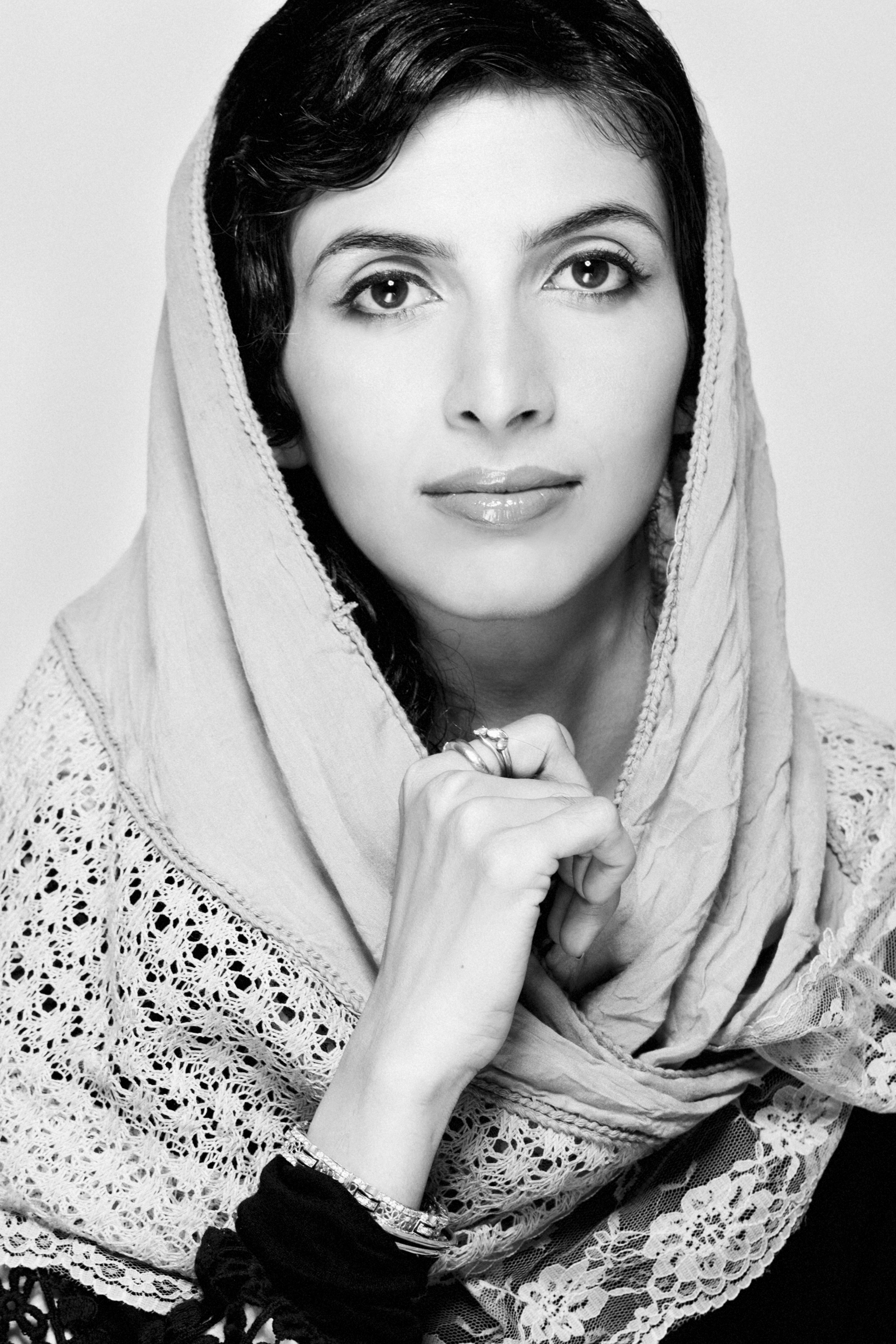
- Roya Mahboob in July 2012
- Born: Herat Province, Afghanistan
- Education: Herat University
- Occupation: Businesswoman
- Known for: Founder and CEO of Afghan Citadel Software Company

Roya Mahboob (Dari: رویا محبوب) is an Afghan businesswoman. She founded and is CEO of the Afghan Citadel Software Company, a full-service software development company based in Herat, Afghanistan. She has received attention for being among the first IT female CEOs in Afghanistan, where it is still relatively rare for women to work outside the home. On 18 April 2013, Mahboob was named to Time magazine's 100 Most Influential People in the World for 2013 for her work in building internet classrooms in high schools in Afghanistan and for Women's Annex, a multilingual blog and video site hosted by Film Annex. This was the 10th anniversary of the TIME special edition. The Women's Annex platform give the women of Afghanistan and Central Asia a platform to tell their stories to the world. The Time magazine introduction to Mahboob was written by Sheryl Sandberg, the chief operating officer of Facebook at the time and the author of "Lean In: Women, Work and the Will to Lead". U.S. Secretary of State John Kerry met with Mahboob and other Afghan women entrepreneurs at the International Center for Women's Economic Development at the American University of Afghanistan. She is also known for her work with online film distribution platform and Web Television Network Film Annex on the Afghan Development Project. She is an advisor at the Forbes School of Business & Technology.

== Biography ==
Mahboob was born in Herat, Afghanistan, but left the country with her family in the wake of the Taliban to live in Iran. She returned to Afghanistan in 2003 and learned English by volunteering at a French NGO specializing in media. She enrolled in information and communications technology courses offered for women by the United Nations Development Programme later that year, and enrolled in a bachelor's degree of Computer Science for information and communications technology at Herat University in 2005. She was educated there by TU Berlin team. She also spent one semester at the TU Berlin within a scope of a training for computer science lecturers. After her graduation in 2009, Mahboob worked as IT-Director at the Herat University and later as project coordinator at the IT-Department of the Ministry of Higher Education, where she worked in close collaboration with the Center for international and intercultural Communication of the TU Berlin. In May 2011, she was included in an inaugural class of seven Afghan entrepreneurs as part of the Herat Information Technology Program, an offshoot of the Task Force for Business and Stability Operations in Afghanistan, which was founded by Paul Brinkley, the former deputy undersecretary of defense, in 2010.

== Career ==
Mahboob founded the Afghan Citadel Software Company (ACSC) in 2010 along with two Herat University classmates and an investment of $20,000. The aim was to create jobs for recent university graduates—especially women—in Afghanistan's growing tech market. The company employs at least 20 programmers, more than half of which are women.

ACSC developed software according to specific requirements that are defined by clients, which are government ministries, universities, and international organizations in Afghanistan. It also created proprietary stand-alone or integrated applications for computers and mobile phones, based on market needs and identified opportunities. Past projects include helping a Herat hospital to shift from paper to digital records as well as helping to bring reliable internet to Herat University as part of NATO's Silk Afghanistan project.

In 2012, Citadel of New York was founded to develop and promote Examer, an Interactive and Educational Social Networking platform with a Micro Scholarship Payment System, which Mahboob helped to develop. Another project resulting from this partnership, Women's Annex, also provides financing for video content on social media and gives Afghan women a chance to begin careers as filmmakers. Citadel of New York acquired a ten percent equity position in Afghanistan's Esteqlal Football Club in October 2012.

In 2014, Mahboob joined the advisory board of the international think tank Global Thinkers Forum.

She established the non-profit organization Digital Citizen Fund (DCF) in 2012 to improve Afghan women’s technological and financial literacy. Through DCF, Mahboob and her brother, Alireza Mehraban, founded the Afghan Girls Robotics Team, also known as the Afghan Dreamers. Mahboob supports the Afghan Girls Robotics Team while promoting robotics education with the Inoura platform. After the Fall of Kabul in 2021, she was involved in the evacuation of Afghan Girls Robotic team members and families through contact with the Qatari government.

== Recognition ==
Mahboob has received recognition for being a female CEO in a country where women largely do not work outside the home. She has received threats for starting and running a business, staffing her company primarily with women, doing business with foreigners, even driving a car. Roya's reaction to this has been, "You have to show everybody that men and women are equal. Women can do something if you allow them. Give them opportunity and they can prove themselves".

Mahboob has also partnered with Film Annex, an online film distribution platform and Web Television Network, to launch the Afghan Development Project in 2012. The project aims to show the world the new face of Afghanistan by broadcasting current event videos, interviews, and news clips as well as archival material directly from Afghan Youth Development. The partnership between Rulli and Mahboob began after a 2011 NATO promotional video] and decided to get involved in the restructuring of Afghanistan. Mahboob and Film Annex are working to build internet classrooms in Afghan schools to connect children to the world and dissuade them from joining the Taliban.

On 18 November 2013, Senator John Kerry wrote an essay for Politico, detailing his experience meeting Roya Mahboob, CEO of the software development firm Citadel as well as the current changes being led by Afghan women in a variety of social areas. Kerry's essay discusses how Afghani women, and Roya Mahboob in particular, are changing not only Afghanistan but also the global community. Senator Kerry details specifically how Mahboob's contributions to Afghani society and the global community are having far reaching impacts. While on the global landscape, Afghanistan still has much work to do, Senator Kerry indicates Mahboob's success as one key female figure is a great step toward bringing about lasting peace and prosperity. "Afghan women aren't stopping. They’re marching forward, and we all need to march with them."

The essay was written as part of a series, and is a collaboration between Politico, Google & the Tory Burch Foundation, titled Women Rule.

== Award and honors ==
- 2013: One of Time‍ 's "100 Most Influential People in the World"
- 2013: Civic Innovator "National Democracy Institute"
- 2014: The Tribeca Disruptive Innovation Awards
- 2015: World Economic Forum Young Global Leaders 2015
- 2015: Michael Dukakis Leadership Fellow
