= Arthur Canario =

American judoka

- Born: Brooklyn, New York, United States
- Style: Judo
- Teacher: Hank Kraft

Arthur Canario
Medal record

Men's Judo

Representing United States

US National Championships
Gold medal – first place	US National Championships	1971

UBelgium Masters
Silver medal – second place	Belgium Masters	2014

Arthur Canario (born in Brooklyn, New York) is a former nationally ranked judo practitioner and collegiate football player for Long Island University at CW Post. As an offensive tackle at LIU, he became an Academic All-American and graduated magna cum laude in 1973. He later attended the Georgetown University School of Medicine and became an orthopedic surgeon.

== Judo career ==
Canario started studying judo as a result of a Christmas present from his parents in 1965. When he began, at the Queens Judo Center in New York, his coach, Hank Kraft, said he had "two left feet". However, he eventually worked his way to the top of the sport. At the 1965 New York Yudanshakai Junior Tournament, held at the Prospect Park YMCA, he placed third in the 16-year-old unlimited category.

At his peak, Canario was a 6'5, 220-pound heavyweight. He was ranked as one of the top 3 judo fighters in the United States in 1971, and won the national heavyweight title that year over Charles Hooks. Although he was named to the US International Team, he was unable to compete at the 1971 World Championships in Germany.

In 2006, he became a 4th degree black belt in judo and competed in the World Masters Judo Competition. Two years later, in 2008, he won the United States Judo Association's Hall of Fame Award for Outstanding Male Masters Competitor. In 2010, he won the bronze medal at the Grand Master and Kata World Championships.

Canario is currently active in the New York Athletic Club and represents it in competitions. He is also the president of the World Masters Judo Association.
