= FIRST Global Challenge =

STEM education and careers for youth

- Frequency: Annually
- Inaugurated: 2017
- Previous event: Eco Equilibrium - FGC 2025
- Next event: Igniting Innovations - FGC 2026
- Participants: 190+ countries
- Organizer: FIRST Global
- Website: first.global

The FIRST Global Challenge is a yearly robotics competition for high school students organized by the International First Committee Association. It promotes STEM education and careers for youth and was created by Dean Kamen in 2016 as an expansion of FIRST, an organization with similar objectives.

The competition consists of one team per country, from over 190 countries globally.

== History ==
FIRST Global is a trade name for the International FIRST Committee Association, a nonprofit corporation based in Manchester, New Hampshire, with a 501(c)(3) designation from the IRS.

The nonprofit was founded by the co-founder of FIRST, Dean Kamen, with the objective of promoting STEM education and careers in the developing world through Olympics-style robotics competitions. Former US Congressman, Joe Sestak was the organization's president in 2017, but left after the 2017 Challenge.

Each year, the FIRST Global Challenge is held in a different city. For example, Mexico City was selected to host the 2018 Challenge after the United States hosted the 2017 edition in Washington, DC. This is a change from FIRST's system of championships, where one city hosts for several years at a time.

The next edition (2026) will take place in Incheon, South Korea.

== Editions ==
=== Washington, D.C. 2017 ===
The 2017 FIRST Global Challenge was held in Washington, D.C., from July 16–18, and the challenge was the use of robots to separate different colored balls, representing clean water and impurities in water, symbolizing the Engineering Grand Challenge (based on the Millennium Development Goal) of improving access to clean water in the developing world. Around 160 teams composed of 15- to 18-year-olds from 157 countries participated, and around 60% of teams were created or led by young women. Six continental teams also participated.

=== Mexico City 2018 ===
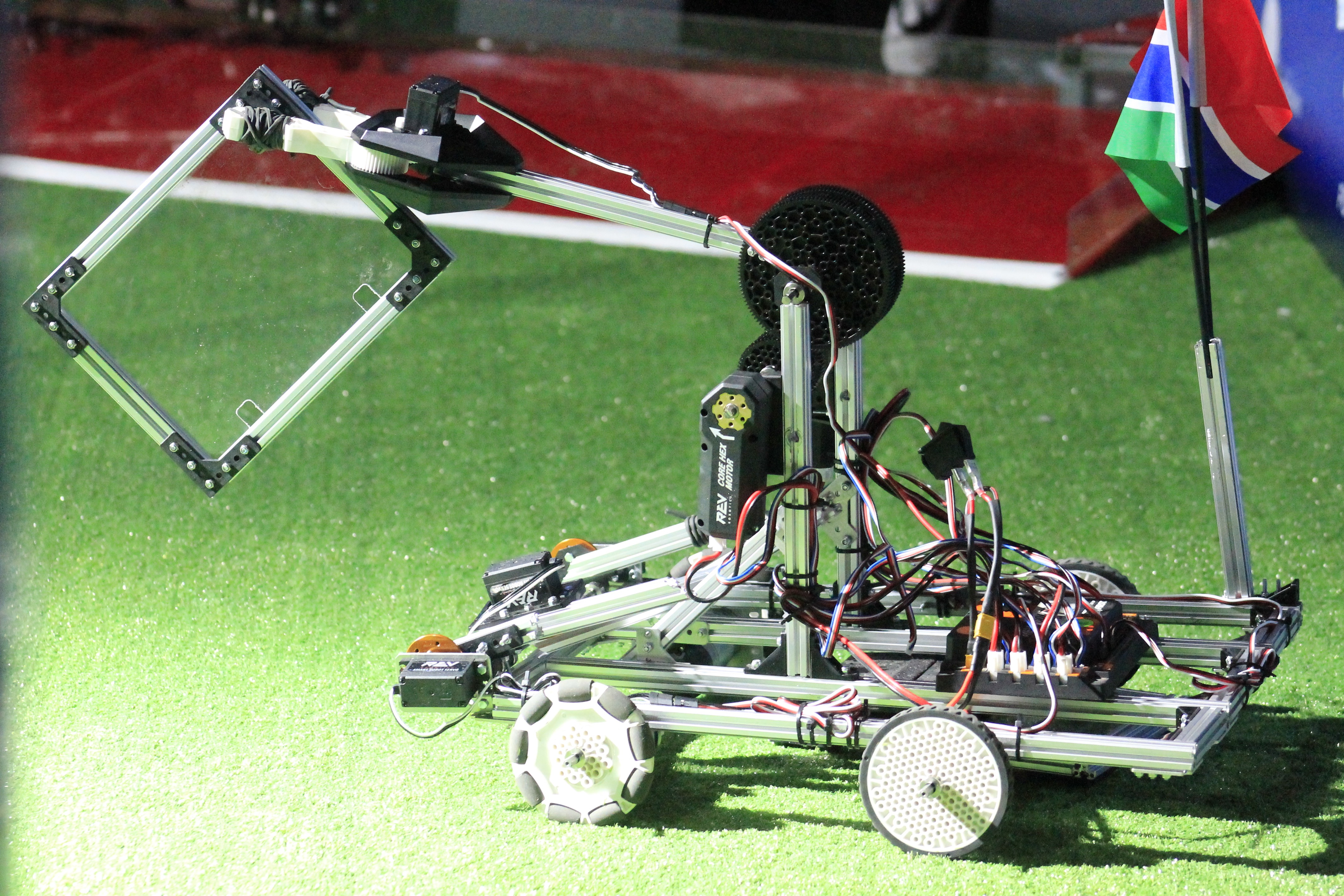
A competition during FIRST Global Challenge 2018

The 2018 FIRST Global Challenge was held in Mexico City from August 15–18. The 2018 Challenge was called Energy Impact and explored the impact of various types of energy on the world and how they can be made more sustainable. In the challenge, robots worked together in teams of three to give cubes to human players, turn a crank, and score cubes in goals in order to generate electrical power. The challenge was based on three Engineering Grand Challenges; making solar energy affordable, making fusion energy a reality, and creating carbon sequestration methods.

=== Dubai 2019 ===
The 2019 challenge, called Ocean Opportunities, was held in Dubai from October 24–27 and was the first challenge hosted outside of North America. The challenge was themed around clearing the ocean of pollutants, and had two alliances of three teams each attempting to score large and small balls representing pollutants into processing areas and a processing barge. The processing barge had multiple levels, with higher levels worth more points. At the end of the match, robots "docked" with the barge by driving onto or climbing up it, with climbing worth more points. The event was opened by Sheikh Hamdan bin Mohammed Al Maktoum, Crown Prince of Dubai.

=== Geneva 2022 ===
The 2022 challenge called Carbon Capture, was held in Geneva from October 13–16. The challenge was themed around removing carbon dioxide (CO_{2}) emissions from the atmosphere. In the Carbon Capture game, six different countries worked together to capture and store black balls representing carbon particles. The storage tower had multiple cantilevered bars that the robots mounted to, with the higher bars worth a greater multiplier. At the end of a match, robots "docked" on the storage tower's base or climbed the bars with their alliance indicator ball. Each match started with a "global alliance" of six countries, then divided into two "regional alliances" each consisting of three countries. The event was opened by Dr. Martina Hirayama, Switzerland State Secretary for Education, Research and Innovation (SERI).

=== Singapore 2023 ===
The 2023 challenge, called Hydrogen Horizons, was held in Singapore from October 7–10. The challenge is themed around renewable energy with a focus on hydrogen technologies.

=== Athens 2024 ===
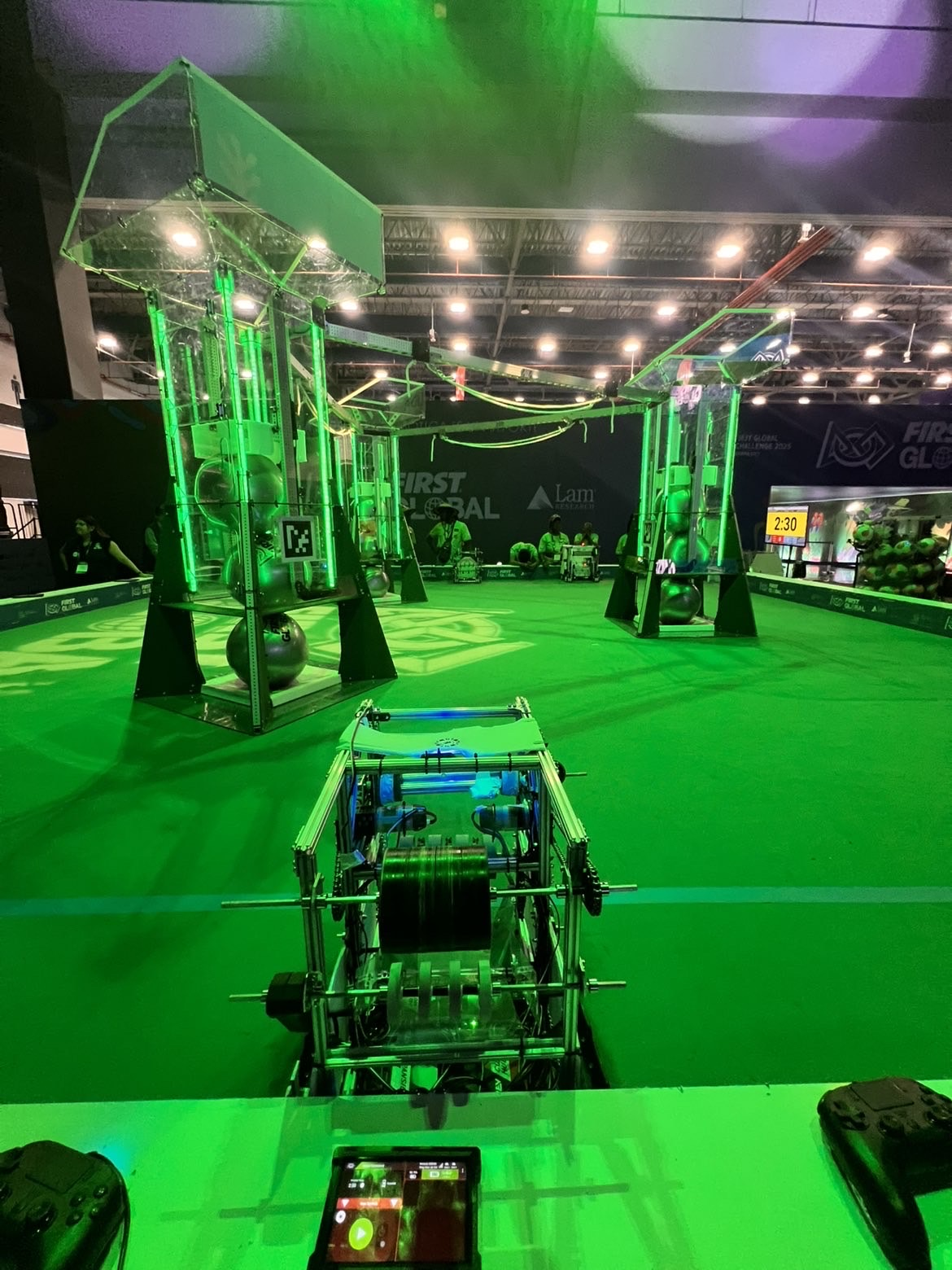
The Eco Equilibrium field, before a match.

The 2024 challenge was hosted in the Peace and Friendship Stadium in Attica, Greece.

=== Panama 2025 ===
The 2025 challenge, Eco Equilibrium, was hosted in the Panama Convention Centre in Panama City, Panama.

=== Incheon 2026 ===
The 2026 challenge, Igniting Innovations, will be hosted at Incheon, South Korea from 7-10 October. The challenge is themed around stopping wildfires and preventing future wildfires.

== Subordinate programs ==
=== Global STEM Corps ===
The Global STEM Corps is a FIRST Global initiative that connects qualified volunteer mentors with students in developing countries to prepare them for competitions.

=== New Technology Experience ===
The New Technology Experience (NTE) is an annual component of the FIRST Global Challenge that was added to the organization's offerings in 2021. It was established as a means for the student community to stay current with cutting-edge technology and is integrated with each year's theme. The 2021 NTE was the CubeSat Prototype Challenge. The 2022 NTE, Carbon Countermeasures, was presented in partnership with XPRIZE.
