= Beth Murphy =

American film director

- Born: Gales Ferry, Connecticut, United States
- Occupations: Film Director, Producer

Beth Murphy is an American documentary director, producer and author who founded the film production company Principle Pictures and is the director of GroundTruth Films. She is director/producer for nearly 20 films (Sundance Channel, PBS, History Channel, Lifetime, Discovery Networks), including the feature documentaries Beyond Belief and The List, both of which premiered at the Tribeca Film Festival and went on to win awards on the festival circuit. Beth is a blogger for Huffington Post and Correspondent/Producer for GlobalPost Special Reports. She is a fellow at Boston University’s Center for Iraq Studies and serves on the board of the International Institute of Boston. Beth is also the winner of the National Edward R. Murrow Award and the Alfred I. duPont–Columbia University Award.

== Career ==
Her film, Beyond Belief, premiered at the 2007 Tribeca Film Festival. From 2008 to 2012, Beth traveled to Iraq, Syria, Jordan and Egypt filming The List, a film about Kirk W. Johnson and his struggle to resettle Iraqi allies in the United States.

In the wake of the Boston Marathon bombings of April 2013, Murphy made headlines for her photo series "To Boston. From Kabul. With Love." The photos in the series depicted sympathetic Kabul locals holding a handmade sign that said "TO BOSTON FROM KABUL WITH LOVE" that was originally made by Murphy for her own self-portrait to send home. Murphy was quoted by the Huffington Post as saying, "My intent changed as I talked to people here about what had happened – many had heard the news – and I saw the pain in their faces, and reminders of their own hardships. They said, “I’m so sorry,” with that defining head shake that doesn't need another word of explanation; it says, “I understand.”

== Filmography ==
- The List (2012)
- Beyond Belief (2007)
- Flu Time Bomb (Discovery International, 2006)
- Flying Pyramids, Soaring Stones (The History Channel, 2004)
- Breast Cancer Legacy hosted by Meredith Baxter (Discovery Health, 2004)
- Fighting for Our Future hosted by Melissa Joan Hart (Lifetime Television, 2002)
- Heroes of Hope: Crisis in Kosovo hosted by Sam Waterston (public television, 2002)
