= Baiatkhevi Achaemenid seal =

Baiatkhevi Achaemenid seal refers to an Achaemenid tabloid seal made out of chalcedony, found in 1982 in burial No. 21 of the Baiatkhevi site in Mtskheta (then Georgian SSR of the Soviet Union, now Georgia). It was discovered by V. Nikolaishvili. All four sides of the seal bear different engravings. The lower, wide side of the seal depicts a Persian warrior on a horse thrusting a javelin into a lion. The warrior wears a Persian hood in addition to a jacket and shoes. A Maltese dog terrier is depicted on the upper, smaller side of the seal. One of the side facets of the seal bears a depiction of a stag, whereas the other side shows an antelope. The seal is of the Greco-Persian style, and was probably created between the later half of the 5th century BC and the first half of the 4th century BC.
