= Maltese dog =

Breed of toy dog

Maltese
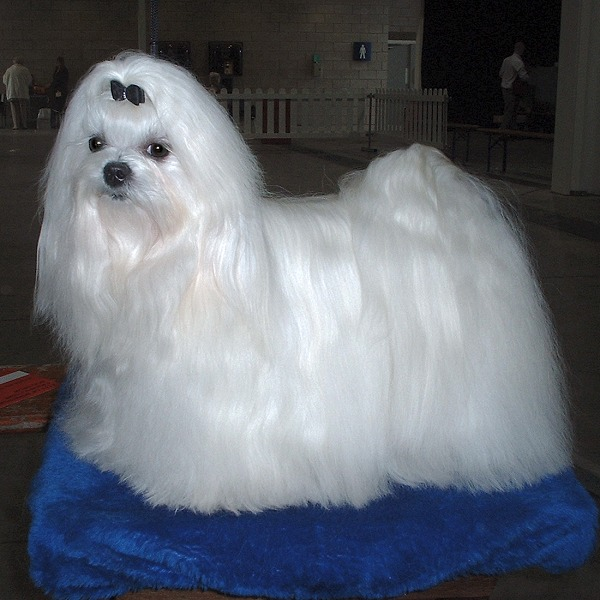
- Maltese groomed with overcoat
- Origin: Italy
Traits
Height	Males	21–25 cm (8–10 in)
	Females	20–23 cm (8–9 in)
- Weight: 3–4 kg (7–9 lb)
- Coat: white
- Litter size: 1 to 3
Kennel club standards
- ENCI: standard
- Fédération Cynologique Internationale: standard

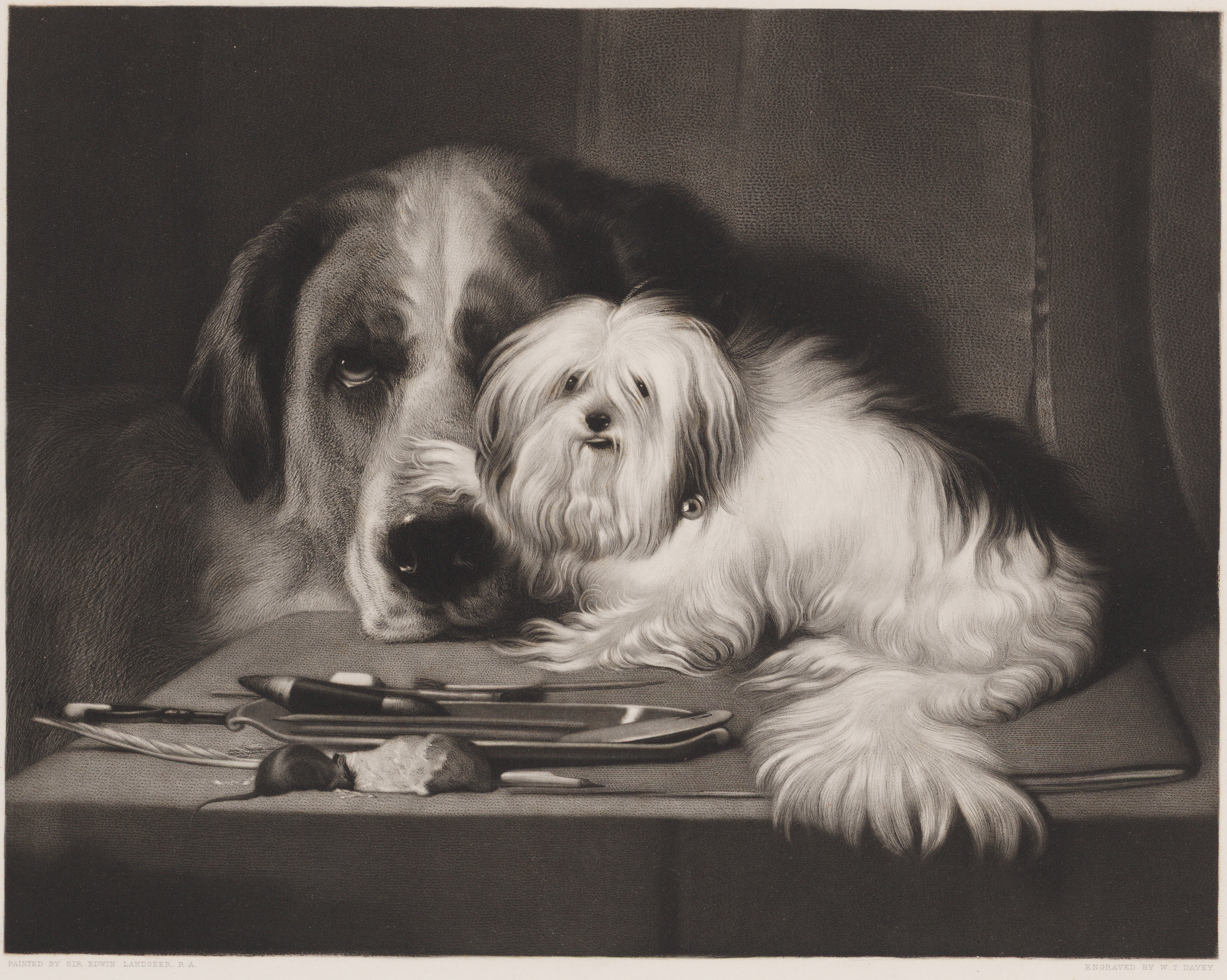
Engraving by William Turner Davey, 1844, from Landseer's painting The Lion Dog of Malta

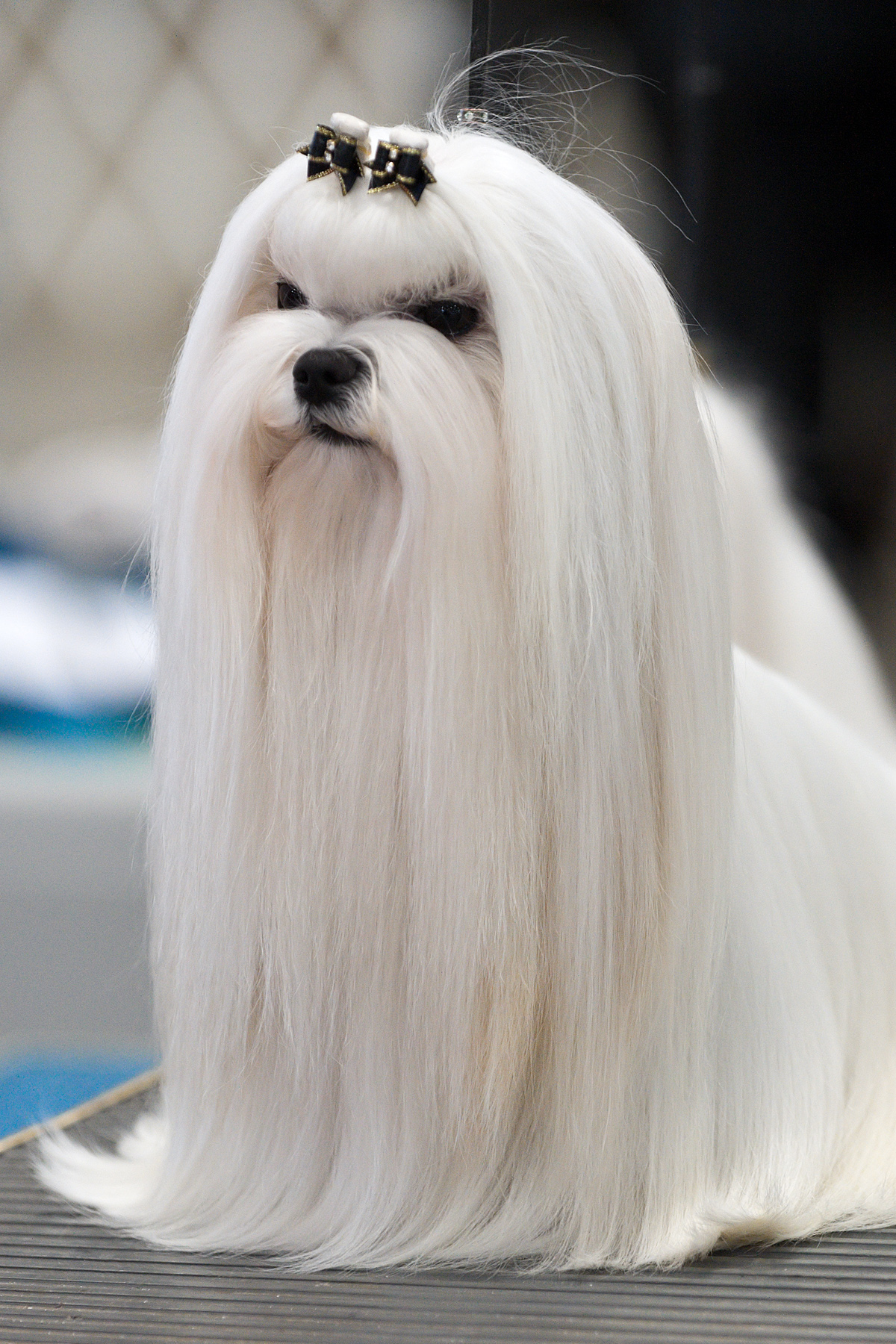
Long-haired Maltese groomed for showing

Maltese dog refers both to an ancient variety of dwarf, white-coated dog breed from Italy and generally associated also with the island of Malta, and to a modern breed of similar dogs in the toy group, genetically related to the Bichon, Bolognese, and Havanese breeds. The precise link, if any, between the modern and ancient breeds is not known. Nicholas Cutillo suggested that Maltese dogs might descend from spitz-type canines, and that the ancient variety probably was similar to the latter Pomeranian breeds with their short snout, pricked ears, and bulbous heads. These two varieties, according to Stanley Coren, were perhaps the first dogs employed as human companions.

The modern variety traditionally has a silky, pure-white coat, hanging ears and a tail that curves over its back, and weighs up to 3–4 kg (7–9 lb). The Maltese does not shed. The Maltese is kept for companionship, ornament, or competitive exhibition.

== Maltese dogs in antiquity ==
The old variety of Maltese appears to have been the most common or favourite pet, or certainly household dog, in antiquity. (Note: "small dogs were also kept as household pets. The commonest of these seems to be an animal resembling the Maltese, an animal with small upright ears and long hair." (Trantalidou 2006, p. 107)) (Note: "the favourite pet dog of antiquity seems to have been the Maltese." (Gosling 1935, p. 100)) (Note: "The commonest pet was the small white long-coated Maltese dog represented on 5th-cent. BC Attic vases and gravestones." (White & Hornblower 2012, p. 1118)) Dogs of various sizes and shapes are depicted on vases and amphorae. On one Attic amphora from about 500 BC, excavated at Vulci in the nineteenth century and now lost, an illustration of a small dog with a pointed muzzle is accompanied by the word μελιταῖε, melitaie.

Numerous references to these dogs are found in Ancient Greek and Roman literature. Ancient writers variously attribute its origin either to the island of Malta in the Mediterranean, called Melita in Latin, – a name which derives from the Carthaginian city of that name on the island, Melite – or to the Adriatic island of Mljet, near Corfu and off the Dalmatian coast of modern Croatia, also called Melita in Latin. The uncertainty continues, but recent scholarship generally supports the identification with Malta.

In Greece in the classical period a variety of diminutive dog (νανούδιον/nanoúdion -"dwarf dog") was called a Μελιταῖον κυνίδιον (Melitaion kunídion, "small dog from Melita"). In its unusual smallness it was variously likened to martens (ἴκτις/iktis) or pangolins. (Note: Aelian in his treatise on animals (De Natura Animalium, 16:6) drew the latter comparison (Busuttil 1969, p. 205).) The word "Melita" in this adjectival form, attested in Aristotle, (Note: Aristotle, Hist Anim.ix 6,612^{b}10) refers to the island of Malta, according to Busuttil. (Note: This lexical argument – that Μελιταῖος/Melitaîosis the proper adjective for Melite/Malta, whereas the adjective for Melite/Mljet must have been Μελιτήνος/Melitēnos has been challenged by the Maltese scholar Horatio Vella, who cites the adjectival form Melitēíos as an attested dialect form of Melitaîos defining a mountain in the Adriatic area near Corcyra (αἱ δ᾽ὄρεος κορυφὰς Μελιτηίου ἀμφενέμοντο: "others dwelt about the peaks of the Meliteian mountain") from the Argonautica (4.1150) of Apollonius of Rhodes.) The Cynic philosopher Diogenes of Sinope, Aristotle's contemporary, according to the testimony of Diogenes Laertius, referred to himself as a "Maltese dog" (κύων.. Μελιταῖος/kúōn Melitaios). A traditional story in Aesop's Fables contrasts the spoiling of a Maltese by his owner, compared to life of the toilsome neglect suffered by the master's ass. Envious of the spoiling attentions lavished on the pup, the ass tries to frolic and be winsome also, in order to enter his master's graces and be treated kindly, only to be beaten off and tethered to its manger. (Note: Ὄνος καὶ κυνίδιον 275:Ἔχων τις κύνα Μελιταῖον καὶ ὄνον διετέλει ἀεὶ τῷ κυνὶ προσπαίζων· καὶ δή, εἴ ποτε ἔξω ἐδείπνει, διεκόμιζέ τι αὐτῷ, καὶ προσιόντι καὶ σαίνοντι παρέβαλλεν. Ὁ δὲ ὄνος φθονήσας προσέδραμε καὶ σκιρτῶν ἐλάκτιζεν αὐτόν. Καὶ ὃς ἀγανακτήσας ἐκέλευσε παίοντας αὐτὸν ἀπαγαγεῖν καὶ τῇ φάτνῃ προσδῆσαι (Aesop 1980, pp. 304–305).)

Around 280 BCE, the learned Hellenistic poet Callimachus, according to Pliny the Elder writing in the Ist century CE, identified Melite – the home of this ancient dog variety – as the Adriatic island, rather than Malta. (Note: "inter quam et Illyricum Melite, unde catulos Melitaeos appellari Callimachus auctor est": "(between Corcyra Melaena) and Illyricum is Meleda, from which according to Callimachus Maltese terriers get their name".) Conversely, the poem Alexandra ascribed to his equally erudite contemporary Lycophron, which is now thought to have been composed around 190 BCE, also alludes to the island of Melite, but identified it as Malta. (Note: "The identity of this island called Melite has been much discussed, but the evident proximity to Cape Pachynos, the southern promontory of Sicily, clearly indicates Malta." (Hornblower 2015, p. 375)) (Note: ἄλλοι δὲ Μελίτην νῆσον Ὀθρωνοῦ πέλας πλαγκτοὶ κατοικήσουσιν, ἣν πέριξ κλύδων ἔμπλην Παχύνου Σικανὸς προσμάσσεται, 1030τοῦ Σισυφείου παιδὸς ὀχθηρὰν ἄκραν ἐπώνυμόν ποθ᾽ ὑστέρῳ χρόνῳ γράφων κλεινόν θ᾽ ἵδρυμα παρθένου Λογγάτιδος, Ἕλωρος ἔνθα ψυχρὸν ἐκβάλλει ποτόν, "Other wanderers shall dwell in the isle of Melita near Othronus, round which the Sicanian wave laps beside Pachynus, grazing the steep promontory that in after time shall bear the name of the son of Sisyphus, and the famous shrine of the maiden Longatis, where Helorus empties his chilly stream." (Lycophron 1921, pp. 406–407).) (Note: This confusion between Malta and Mljet also recurs in ancient references to the site of the shipwreck of St. Paul recounted in the Acts of the Apostles.) Strabo, writing in the early first century AD, attributed its origin to the island of Malta. (Note: πρόκειται δὲ τοῦ Παχύνου Μελίτη, ὅθεν τὰ κυνίδια ἃ καλοῦσι Μελιταῖα καὶ Γαῦδος, ὀγδοήκοντα καὶ ὀκτὼ μίλια τῆς ἄκρας ἀμφότεραι διέχουσαι: "Off Pachynus lies Melita, whence come the little dogs called Melitaean, and Gaudos, both eighty-eight miles distant from the Cape.")

Aristotle's successor Theophrastus (371 – c. 287 BC), in his sketch of moral types, Characters, has a chapter on a type of person who takes petty pride in pursuing the showy ambition of being particularly fastidious in his tastes (Μικροφιλοτιμία/mikrophilotimía). One feature he identifies with this character type is that if his pet dog dies he will erect a memorial slab commemorating his "scion of Melita." (Note: καὶ κυναρίου δὲ Μελιταίου τελευτήσαντος αὐτῷ μνῆμα ποιῆσαι καὶ στηλίδιον ποιήσας [10] ἐπιγράψαι ΚΛΑΔΟΣ ΜΕΛΙΤΑΙΟΣ: "Or if his little Melitean dog has died, he will put up a little memorial slab, with the inscription, a scion of Melita." Jebb, or his posthumous editor, Sandys, argued that the reference was to the Illyrian Melita, rather than Malta.) Athenaeus, in his voluminous early 3rd century CE Deipnosophistae (12:518–519), states that it was a characteristic of the Sicilian Sybarites, notorious for the extreme punctiliousness of their refined tastes, to delight in the company of owl-faced jester-dwarfs and Melite lap-dogs (rather than in their fellow human beings), with the latter accompanying them even when they went to exercise in the gymnasia. (Note: καὶ κυνάρια Μελιταῖα, ἅπερ αὐτοῖς καὶ ἕπεσθαι εἰς τὰ γυμνάσια; οἱ Συβαρῖται ἔχαιρον τοῖς Μελιταίοις κυνιδίοις καὶ ἀνθρώποις οὐκ ἀνθρώποις: "also Melitê lap-dogs. Which accompany them even to the gymnasia..The Sybarites, on the contrary, took delight in Melitê puppies and human beings who were less than human.")

The Romans called them catuli melitaei. During the first century, the Roman poet Martial wrote descriptive verses to a lap dog named "Issa" owned by his friend Publius. (Note: (Gosling 1935, pp. 110–111): Issa's more full of sport and wanton play Than that pet sparrow by Catullus sung; Issa's more pure and cleanly in her way Than kisses from the amorous turtle's tongue, Issa more winsome is than any girl That ever yet entranced a lover's sight; Issa's more precious than the Indian pearl Issa's my Publius' favourite and delight. Her plaintive voice falls sad as one that weeps; Her master's cares and woes alike she shares; Softly reclined upon his neck she sleeps, And scarce to sigh or draw her breath she dares. Her, lest the day of fate should nothing leave, In pictured form my Publius has portrayed Where you so lifelike Issa might perceive. That not herself a better likeness made, Issa together with her portrait lay, Both real or both depicted you would say.) It has been claimed that Issa was a Maltese dog, and that various sources link this Publius with the Roman Governor Publius of Malta, but nothing is known of this Publius, other than that he was an unidentified friend of Paulus, a member of Martial's literary circle.

== The Maltese in modern times ==
Dog genomic experts state that despite the rich history of the ancient breed, the modern Maltese, like many other breeds, cannot be linked by pedigree to that ancient genealogy, but, rather, emerged in the Victorian era by regulating the crossing of existing varieties of dog to produce a type that could be registered as a distinct breed. The Maltese and similar breeds such as the Havanese, Bichon and Bolognese, are indeed related, perhaps through a common ancestor resulting from a severe bottleneck when a handful of petite canine varieties began to be selected for mating around two centuries ago.

In his work Insulae Melitae Descriptio, the first history of its kind, Abbé Jean Quintin, Secretary to the Grand Master of the Knights of Malta Philippe Villiers de L'Isle-Adam, wrote in 1536 that, while classical authors wrote of Maltese dogs, which perhaps might formerly have been born there, the local Maltese people of his time were no longer familiar with the species. (Note: "Huic insulae Strabo nobiles illos, adagio, non minus quam medicinis, canes adscribit, inde Melitaeos dictos, Plinio, & nunc etiam incolis ignotos, tunc forte nascebantur.")

John Caius, physician to Queen Elizabeth I, writing of women's chamber pets, canes delicati such as the Comforter or Spanish Gentle, stated that they were known as "Melitei" hailing from Malta, though the species he describes were actually Spaniels, perhaps of the recently imported King Charles Spaniel type. A variation of the latter was the Blenheim toy dog, bred by the Marlborough family, with its distinctive white and chestnut mantle. Red and white mantled varieties of these toy pets, the King Charles or Oxfordshire Blenheim breeds, were all the fashion in the 17th.century, down through the early decades of the 19th.century.

In 1837 Edwin Landseer painted The Lion Dog from Malta: The Last of his Tribe, a portrait of a dog named Quiz, a petite flossy white creature poised next to a huge Newfoundland dog, commissioned by Queen Victoria as a birthday present for her mother, the Duchess of Kent, whose dog it was. According to John Henry Welsh, shortly after Landseer's canvases, the London fancy of toy dog enthusiasts took to importing exemplars of the Chinese spaniel, with their short faces and snub noses, and crossbred these with pugs and bulldogs to select for puppies with a longer "feather" or fleecing on their ears and limbs. Some time later, the London market began to deal in what were called "Maltese" dogs. These had no known connection to that island, and one of the breeders, T. V. H. Lukey, associated with the English Mastiff, stated that his own Maltese strain was imported from the Manilla Islands in 1841.

A strain of this type was accepted as a distinct class at the Agricultural Hall Show in Islington in 1862, when a breeder, R. Mandeville, took first prize and continued to do so in subsequent years. From 1869 to 1879, Mandeville swept the board of most shows in Birmingham, Islington, the Crystal Palace, and Cremorne Gardens, and his kennels were considered to have furnished the finest strain for subsequent Maltese breeding. From the 19th. century onwards, the requirement emerged for the Maltese to have an exclusively white coat. Despite the unknown provenance, by the close of the century, the dog-expert William Drury noted that nearly all English writers of that period associated the breed with Malta, without adducing any evidence for the claim.

A white dog was shown as a "Maltese Lion Dog" at the first Westminster Kennel Club Dog Show in New York City in 1877. From that time they were occasionally crossed with poodles, and a stud book, based on the issue of two females, was established in 1901. By the 1950s, this registry counted roughly 50 dogs in its pedigree table. The Maltese was recognised as a breed by the American Kennel Club in 1888. It was definitively accepted by the Fédération Cynologique Internationale under the patronage of Italy in 1955.

== Characteristics ==
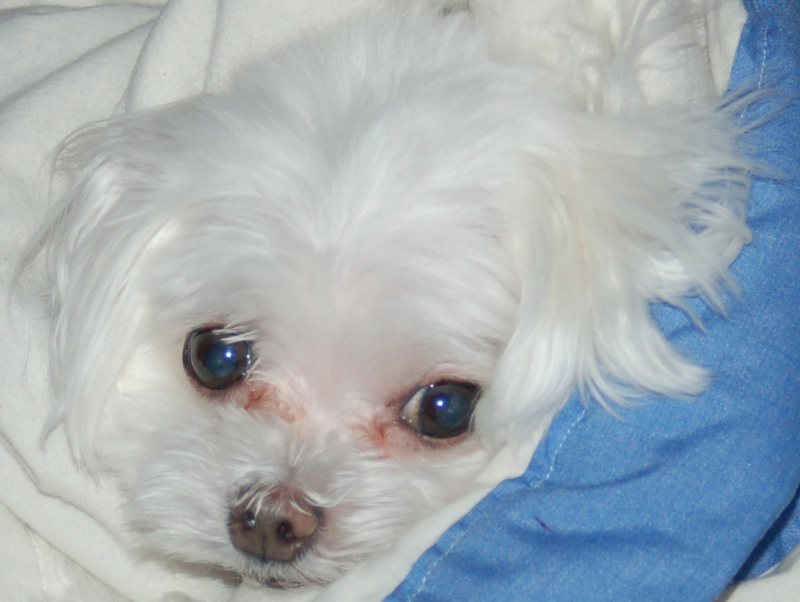
Maltese showing tear staining

The coat is dense, glossy, silky and shiny, falling heavily along the body without curls or an undercoat. The colour is pure white, however a pale ivory tinge or light brown spotting is permitted. Adult weight is usually 3–4 kg (7–9 lb). Females are about 20–23 cm (8–9 in) tall, males slightly more. They behave in a lively, calm, and affectionate manner. The Maltese does not shed. Like other white dogs, they may show tear-stains.

The breed may be prone to health problems such as liver and heart issues, and Luxating patella. They should be checked for conditions like "Patent Ductus Arteriosus". (Note: 'Maltese can develop luxating patellas, an inherited condition where one or both of the kneecaps pop in and out of place. Although patellar luxation is not generally considered a painful condition, it may cause the dog to favor one leg and can predispose them to other knee injuries (such as a cranial cruciate ligament tear) and arthritis. Depending on the severity of the luxating patella, surgery may be recommended to prevent further injury and improve your Maltese's quality of life. Responsible Maltese breeders will screen their puppies for heart abnormalities such as patent ductus arteriosus. PDA is an inherited condition where the ductus arteriosus, the normal opening between the two major blood vessels in the heart that closes shortly after birth, does not close. This condition causes blood to flow improperly and forces the left side of the heart to work harder. This leads to eventual failure of that chamber. Depending on the size of the opening, dogs may show minimal symptoms to severe signs of heart failure.')

Of note, the breed is also highly recommended for those with dog allergies, as the breed is considered hypoallergenic. Hence, some people with dog allergies may be able to tolerate living with a Maltese as they shed less fur.

== Use ==
The Maltese is kept for companionship, for ornament, or for competitive exhibition. It is ranked 59th of 79 breeds assessed for intelligence by Stanley Coren.

== Health ==
A 2024 UK study found a life expectancy of 13.1 years for the breed compared to an average of 12.7 for purebreeds and 12 for crossbreeds. A 2024 Italian study found a life expectancy of 11 years for the breed compared to 10 years overall.

== See also ==
- Lap dog
- List of dog breeds

== Sources ==
- Aesop (1980) [First published 1951]. Manganelli, Giorgio; Valla, Elena Ceva (eds.). Esopo Favole. Rizzoli.
- Alderton, David (2010). The Dog Selector: How to Choose the Right Dog for You. Barron's. ISBN 978-0-764-16365-4.
- Apollonius de Rhodes (1981). Vian, Francis (ed.). Argonautiques. Vol. 3. Les Belles Lettres. ISBN 2-251-10353-8.
- Athenaeus (1980). Gulick, Charles Burton (ed.). Deipnosophistae. Vol. 5. Loeb Classical Library. ISBN 0-434-99274-7.
- Blarney, Edwin Reginald; Inglee, Charles Topping, eds. (1949). The Complete Dog Book. The care, handling, and feeding of dogs; and Pure bred dogs; the recognized breeds and standards. Garden City Publishing Co.
- Brearley, Joan McDonald (1984). The Book of the Maltese. TFH Publications. ISBN 978-0-876-66563-3.
- Breeds by Year Recognized. American Kennel Club. 3 May 2022.
- Busuttil, J. (1969). "The Maltese Dog". Greece & Rome. 16 (2): 205–208. doi:10.1017/S0017383500017058. JSTOR 642850. S2CID 163799376.
- Coren, Stanley (2006). The Intelligence of Dogs. London: Pocket Books. ISBN 978-1-416-50287-6.
- Cutillo, Nicholas (1986). The Complete Maltese. Howell. ISBN 978-0-876-05209-9.
- Delgado, Albert (16 March 2020). "The Maltese dog: a toy for ancient royalty". Times of Malta.
- "Dog Breed Directory: Maltese". Animal Planet. Archived from the original on 13 June 2011.
- Drury, William D. (1903). British Dogs: Their Points, Selection, and Show Preparation (PDF). L. Upcott Gill, Charles Scribner. pp. 575–581.
- Fielheller, Vicki. "Tear Staining". American Maltese Association.
- Franco, Cristiana (2019). "Dogs and Humans in Ancient Greece and Rome: Towards a Definition of Extended Appropriate Interaction". In Sorenson, John; Matsuoka, Atsuko (eds.). Dog's Best Friend?: Rethinking Canid-Human Relations. McGill-Queen's University Press. ISBN 978-0-773-55906-6.
- Gorman, James (4 October 2021). "How Old Is the Maltese, Really?". The New York Times.
- Gosling, W. F. (February 1935). "Pets in Classical Times". Greece & Rome. 4 (11): 109–113. doi:10.1017/S0017383500003144. JSTOR 640982. S2CID 162223203.
- Hornblower, Simon (2015). Lycophron Alexandra. Oxford University Press. ISBN 978-0-199-57670-8.
- Jebb, R. C. (1909) [First published 1870]. Sandys, J. E. (ed.). The Characters of Theophrastus (PDF). Macmillan.
- Johnson, Helen M. (19 May 1919). "The Portrayal of the Dog on Greek Vases". The Classical Weekly. 12 (27): 209–213. doi:10.2307/4387846. JSTOR 4387846.
- Johnstone, Gemma (7 December 2023). "Does a Completely Hypoallergenic Dog Exist?". American Kennel Club.
- Kho-Pelfrey, Teresa (17 October 2022). "Maltese". Pet MD.
- Lee, Rawden B. (1899). Modern Dogs (Non-Sporting Division), including Toy, Pet, Fancy, and Ladies' Dogs (PDF) (3rd ed.). H. Cox – via Internet Archive.
- Leighton, Robert (1910). Dogs and all about them (PDF). Cassell and Company. pp. 296–300.
- Lycophron (1921). Mair, A.W. (ed.). Callimachus, Lycophron, Aratus. Loeb Classical Library.
- Lytton, Mrs Neville (1911). Toy Dogs and Their Ancestors. New York: D. Appleton & Company – via BHL.
- MacKinnon, Michael; Belanger, Kyle (2006). "Sickness and in Health: Care for an Arthritic Maltese Dog from the Roman Cemetery of Yasmina, Carthage, Tunisia". In Snyder, Lynn M.; Moore, Elizabeth A. (eds.). Dogs and People in Social, Working, Economic or Symbolic Interaction: Proceedings of the 9th Conference of the International Council of Archaeozoology, Durham, August 2002. Oxbow Books. pp. 38–43. ISBN 978-1-785-70399-7.
- "Maltese" (PDF). Thuin, Belgium: Fédération Cynologique Internationale (AISBL). 17 December 2015.
- Moore, Mary B. (2008). "The Hegesiboulos Cup". Metropolitan Museum Journal. 43: 11–37. doi:10.1086/met.43.25699084. JSTOR 25699084. S2CID 192949602.
- Ogden, Daniel (2007). In Search of the Sorcerer's Apprentice: The traditional tales of Lucian's Lover of Lies. ISD LLC. ISBN 978-1-914-53510-9.
- "Pet Information: The Maltese". Manila Standard/American Kennel Club. 5 March 2022.
- Pfeiffer, Rudolf (1949). Callimachus. Vol. 1. Oxford University Press. ISBN 0-19-814115-7.
- Pliny (1942). Rackham, Harris (ed.). Natural History. Vol. 2. Loeb Classical Library. ISBN 0-674-99388-8.
- Quintin, Jean (1536). Insulae Melitae descriptio ex commentariis rerum quotidianarum. Lyon: Sebastian Gryphius.
- Raymond-Mallock, Lilian C. (1907). The Up-to-date Toy Dog: The History, Points and Standards of English Toy Spaniels, Japanese Spaniels, Pomeranians, Toy Terriers, Pugs, Pekinese, Griffon Bruxellois, Maltese and Italian Greyhounds. Battle Creek, Michigan: The Dogdom Publishing Company – via HathiTrust Digital Library.
- Serpell, James (1996). In the company of animals: a study of human-animal relationships. Cambridge University Press. ISBN 978-0-521-57779-3.
- Stephens, Frederic George (1874). Memoirs of Sir Edwin Landseer: A Sketch of the Life of the Artist, Illustrated with Reproductions of Twenty-four of His Most Popular Works. George Bell.
- Strabo (1924). Jones, Horace Leonard (ed.). The Geography of Strabo. Loeb Classical Library. ISBN 978-0-674-99201-6.
- Trantalidou, Katerina (2006). "Companions from the Oldest Times: Dogs in Ancient Greek Literature, Iconography and Osteological Testimony". In Snyder, Lynn M.; Moore, Elizabeth A. (eds.). Dogs and People in Social, Working, Economic or Symbolic Interaction: Proceedings of the 9th Conference of the International Council of Archaeozoology, Durham, August 2002. Oxbow Books. pp. 96–120. ISBN 978-1-785-70399-7 – via ResearchGate.
- Various (2010). The Maltese Dog-A Complete Anthology of the Dog 1860-1940. Vintage Books. ISBN 978-1-445-52750-5.
- Vella, Horatio C. R. (September 1995). "The island of Gozo in classical texts" (PDF). Occasional Papers on Islands and Small States. 13. Islands and Small States Institute, Malta: 1–40.
- Vioque, Guillermo Galán (2017). Martial, Book VII. A Commentary. Translated by J. J. Zoltowsky. BRILL. ISBN 978-9-004-35097-7.
- Welsh, J. H. (1882). The dogs of the British Islands, being a series of articles on the points of their various breeds, and the treatment of the diseases to which they are subject (PDF) (4th ed.). H. Cox. pp. 238–242.
- White, Sheila; Hornblower, Simon (2012). "Pets". In Hornblower, Simon; Spawforth, Antony; Eidinow, Esther (eds.). The Oxford Classical Dictionary. Oxford University Press. ISBN 978-0-199-54556-8.
