= Betty Twarog =

American biochemist (1927–2013)

- Born: August 28, 1927; New York City, U.S.
- Died: February 6, 2013 (aged 85); Damariscotta, Maine, U.S.
- Education: Swarthmore College; Tufts University
- Scientific career
- Fields: Biochemistry

Betty Mack Twarog (August 28, 1927 – February 6, 2013) was an American neurophysiologist who first discovered serotonin in the mammalian brain in 1952.

It was "one of the most important scientific discoveries of the twentieth century, one that hanged the course of neuroscience and medicine and set off a revolution in the way we think of ourselves", wrote the psychologist Gary Greenberg in his book about depression.

Twarog "laid the cornerstone of the antidepressant revolution" that began in 1978 with antidepressant SSRI medicines. Her research involved mollusks and other ocean animals, and focused on smooth muscle chemical basis of nerve–muscle interaction.

== Life and career ==
Betty Twarog was born on August 28, 1927, in New York City, where she graduated from Hunter College High School. She studied mathematics at Swarthmore College from 1944 to 1948, and then studied for a master's of science from Tufts College, where she heard a lecture on mollusc muscle neurology. The lecture inspired her to enroll, in 1949, in a PhD under John Welsh at Harvard University.

By 1952, she submitted a paper to Journal of Cell Physiology showing that serotonin had a role as a neurotransmitter in mussels. Her hypothesis went against established ideas about the nervous system, and the journal editor Detlev Bronk (president of Johns Hopkins University) ignored it until her advisor John Welsh called him to ask the paper's status. During the time it had gone unpublished, other researchers had published similar discoveries about serotonin, in support of Twarog's conclusion.

Bronk eventually published Twarog's paper in 1954, but she is nonetheless recognized as the first.

In autumn 1952 Twarog moved for family reasons to the Kent State University area, and chose the Cleveland Clinic as a place to continue her study of her hypothesis that invertebrate neurotransmitters would also be found in mammals. Irvine Page did not believe serotonin would be found in the brain, he nevertheless gave Twarog a laboratory and technician. By June 1953 a paper was submitted announcing the isolation of serotonin in mammalian brain.

Twarog left the Cleveland Clinic in 1954. She held appointments at Harvard, SUNY at Stony Brook, York University School of Medicine, University of Pennsylvania, Bryn Mawr. She was among the most prominent professors at Tufts University before she left in 1975 due to what she called "a systemic pattern of underpaying women". She was awarded a Guggenheim Fellowship in 1972.

In 1990, Twarog moved to Maine, where she was involved with research at the Bigelow Laboratory for Ocean Sciences in the town of Boothbay Harbor. She then joined the University of Maine's Darling Marine Laboratory to study how shellfish evade phytoplankton using ocean samples from the Boothbay Harbor.

== Personal life ==
Twarog was widely curious and well-read. She enjoyed murder mysteries, opera and classical music, and conservationism causes. In the last two decades of her life, she spent time birdwatching on her property in Edgecomb, Maine. "She also enjoyed a large and eclectic group of friends and acquaintances", said her obituary.

She was described as "a slightly built woman with ramrod-straight posture and long dark hair drawn back tightly from a dramatic widow’s peak", in Manufacturing Depression by Gary Greenberg

Twarog died on February 6, 2013, at the age of 85 in Damariscotta, Maine.
