= Ethel Tobach =

American psychologist

- Born: November 7, 1921; Miaskovka, Ukrainian Soviet Socialist Republic, Soviet Union
- Died: August 14, 2015 (aged 93); Wayland, Massachusetts, United States
- Education: Hunter College (B.A., 1949); New York University (M.A., 1952; Ph.D, 1957)
- Known for: Comparative psychology Peace psychology
- Spouse: Charles Tobach (m. 1947–2015)
- Awards: Kurt Lewin Award from the Society for the Psychological Study of Social Issues (1993)
- Scientific career
- Fields: Psychology
- Institutions: NYU Medical Center; Payne Whitney Psychiatric Clinic; American Museum of Natural History; New York University; Yeshiva University; City University of New York
- Thesis: A study of 'autonomic reactivity' in mice as related to developmental environment, approach response impedance, avoidance conditioning rate and difficult discrimination training (1957)
- Doctoral advisor: T. C. Schneirla

Ethel Tobach (November 7, 1921 – August 14, 2015) was an American psychologist known for her work in comparative and peace psychology.

== Early life and education ==
Tobach was born on November 7, 1921, in Miaskovka, Ukrainian Soviet Socialist Republic, which was then part of the Soviet Union. Both of Tobach's parents were Jewish, which led to them and their daughter having to flee the country to avoid pogroms soon after Tobach was born. They initially fled to Palestine, but after Tobach's father died when she was nine months old, she and her mother moved to Philadelphia in the United States. Tobach and her mother lived in Philadelphia until they moved to Brooklyn, New York when Tobach was ten years old. She became interested in psychology after enrolling at Hunter College in 1937. She received her B.A. from Hunter College in 1949, graduating Phi Beta Kappa. She then enrolled at New York University (NYU), where she received her M.A. in 1952 and her Ph.D. in 1957 under the supervision of T. C. Schneirla.

== Career ==
After taking one of Schneirla's comparative psychology classes at NYU, in which she got an A, Tobach persuaded Schneirla to give her a job at the American Museum of Natural History. She would continue to work at the American Museum of Natural History for the rest of her career. During her career, she also served on the faculty of NYU, Hunter College, the CUNY Graduate Center, and Yeshiva University.

=== Positions in learned societies ===
In 1964, she was a co-founder of the Animal Behavior Society. In 1972, she became vice president of the New York Academy of Sciences. In 1983, she and Gary Greenberg founded the International Society for Comparative Psychology. She subsequently served as the Society's first president. In 1984, she was named president of the American Psychological Association (APA)'s Division of Comparative and Physiological Psychology, holding this position until 1985. She was the president of the Eastern Psychological Association from 1987 to 1988. In 2004, she served as president of the APA's Division of Peace Psychology.

== Honors and awards ==
Tobach was elected a Fellow of the Animal Behavior Society in 1970. Tobach received the Society for the Psychological Study of Social Issues' Kurt Lewin Award, the society's most prestigious award, in 1993. In 2003, she received the APA's Gold Medal Award for Life Achievement in Psychology in the Public Interest for her "work against racism and sexism, and her leadership in psychology groups dedicated to peace and nuclear disarmament."

== Personal life and death ==
Tobach married Charles Tobach, a photojournalist, in 1947; he subsequently persuaded her to apply to the Ph.D. program in psychology at NYU. She died in her sleep on August 14, 2015, in Wayland, Massachusetts.
