= List of carcinologists =

This is a list of notable carcinologists. A carcinologist is a scientist who studies crustaceans or is otherwise involved in carcinology (the science of crustaceans).

Name	Born	Died	Country	Ref.
Arthur Adams	1820	1878	United Kingdom	
Shane T. Ahyong			Australia	
Alfred William Alcock	1859	1933	United Kingdom	
Donald Anderson	1939		Australia	
William Baird	1803	1872	United Kingdom	
Heinrich Balss	1886	1957	Germany	
Keppel Harcourt Barnard	1887	1964	South Africa	
Paul Bartsch	1871	1960	United States	
Thomas Bell	1792	1880	United Kingdom	
James Everard Benedict	1854	1940	United States	
Dorothy E. Bliss	1916	1987	United States	
Lancelot Alexander Borradaile	1872	1945	United Kingdom	
Louis Augustin Guillaume Bosc	1759	1828	France	
Edward L. Bousfield	1926	2016	Canada	
Geoffrey A. Boxshall	1950		United Kingdom	
Eugène Louis Bouvier	1856	1944	France	
Thomas Elliot Bowman III	1918	1995	United States	
George Stewardson Brady	1832	1921	United Kingdom	
Johann Friedrich von Brandt	1802	1879	Germany	
Gustav Henrik Andreas Budde-Lund	1846	1911	Denmark	
Martin Burkenroad	1910	1986	United States	
William Thomas Calman	1871	1952	United Kingdom	
Fenner Albert Chace, Jr.	1908	2004	United States	
Charles Chilton	1860	1929	New Zealand	
Carl Friedrich Wilhelm Claus	1835	1899	Germany	
J. Stanley Cobb	1942	2020	United States	
Giuseppe Colosi	1892	1975	Italy	
Alain G. P. Crosnier	1930	2021	France	
Eugen von Daday	1855	1920	Romania	
Anthony D'Agostino	1931	2017	United States	
James Dwight Dana	1813	1895	United States	
Charles Darwin	1809	1882	United Kingdom	
Wilhem de Haan	1801	1855	Netherlands	
Johannes Govertus de Man	1850	1930	Netherlands	
Anselme Gaëtan Desmarest	1784	1838	France	
Johan Christian Fabricius	1745	1808	Denmark	
Walter Faxon	1848	1920	United States	
Darryl L. Felder			United States	
Milton F. Fingerman	1928	2022	United States	
Joseph F. Fitzpatrick, Jr.	1932	2002	United States	
Jacques Forest	1920	2012	France	
	Wilhelm Giesbrecht	1854	1913	Germany
Martin Glaessner	1906	1989	Australia	
Isabella Gordon	1901	1988	United Kingdom	
Karl Grobben	1854	1945	Austria	
Jean Abel Gruvel	1870	1941	France	
Félix Édouard Guérin-Méneville	1799	1874	France	
Danièle Guinot	1933		France	
Robert Gurney	1879	1950	United Kingdom	
Hans Jacob Hansen	1855	1936	Denmark	
William Aitcheson Haswell	1854	1925	United Kingdom	
Adrian Hardy Haworth	1768	1833	United Kingdom	
William Perry Hay	1872	1947	United States	
Camill Heller	1823	1917	Austria	
Johann Friedrich Wilhelm Herbst	1743	1807	Germany	
Robert R. Hessler	1932	2020	United States	
Horton H. Hobbs, Jr.	1914	1994	United States	
Lipke Holthuis	1921	2008	Netherlands	
Lauren E. Hughes			Australia	
Arthur Humes	1916	1999	United States	
Frederick Hutton	1836	1905	United Kingdom	
Thomas Henry Huxley	1825	1895	United Kingdom	
Paul Louis Illg	1914	1998	United States	
Stanko Luka Karaman	1889	1959	North Macedonia	
Stanley Wells Kemp	1882	1945	United Kingdom	
Brian Frederick Kensley	1944	2004	South Africa	
Friedrich Kiefer	1897	1985	Germany	
Henrik Nikolai Krøyer	1799	1870	Denmark	
Karl Georg Herman Lang	1901	1976	Sweden	
Pierre André Latreille	1762	1833	France	
William Elford Leach	1790	1836	United Kingdom	
Marie V. Lebour	1876	1971	United Kingdom	
Rafael Lemaitre	c. 1956		France	
Dominique Auguste Lereboullet	1804	1865	France	
Liu Rui-Yu			China	
James K. Lowry	1942		Australia	
Allan Riverstone McCulloch	1885	1925	Australia	
William Sharp Macleay	1792	1865	United Kingdom	
Raymond B. Manning	1934	2000	United States	
Eduard von Martens	1831	1904	Germany	
Edward J. Miers	1851	1930	United Kingdom	
Alphonse Milne-Edwards	1835	1900	France	
Henri Milne-Edwards	1800	1885	France	
Théodore Monod	1902	2000	France	
William A. Newman	1948		United States	
Peter Kee Lin Ng	1960		Singapore	
Guillaume-Antoine Olivier	1756	1814	France	
Arnold Edward Ortmann	1863	1927	Germany	
Isabel Pérez Farfante	1916	2009	Cuba	
Victor Vladimirovich Petryashov	1956	2018	Russia	
Gary Poore	1944		Australia	
Constantine Samuel Rafinesque	1783	1840	France	
John Witt Randall	1813	1892	United States	
Mary J. Rathbun	1860	1943	United States	
Richard Rathbun	1852	1918	United States	
Martin Rathke	1793	1860	Germany	
August Emanuel von Reuss	1811	1873	Austria	
Harriet Richardson	1874	1958	United States	
Antoine Risso	1777	1845	France	
Henry Bardt Roberts	1910	1979	United States	
Michèle de Saint Laurent	1926	2003	France	
George Samouelle	1790	1846	United Kingdom	
Georg Ossian Sars	1837	1927	Norway	
Michael Sars	1805	1869	Norway	
Thomas Say	1787	1834	United States	
Octavius Albert Sayce	1862	1911	Australia	
Waldo L. Schmitt	1887	1977	United States	
Gerhard Scholtz			Germany	
Frederick Schram	1943		United States	
Raoul Serène	1909	1980	France	
Philipp Franz von Siebold	1796	1866	Germany	
Dorothy M. Skinner	1930	2005	United States	
Alfred Evans Smalley	1928	1994	United States	
Sidney Irving Smith	1843	1926	United States	
Charles Spence Bate	1819	1889	United Kingdom	
Thomas Roscoe Rede Stebbing	1835	1926	United Kingdom	
William Stimpson	1832	1872	United States	
Jan Hendrik Stock	1931	1997	Netherlands	
Walter Medley Tattersall	1882	1948	United Kingdom	
G. M. Thomson	1848	1933	New Zealand	
Albert Vandel	1894	1980	France	
Victor van Straelen	1889	1946	Belgium	
Karl Wilhelm Verhoeff	1867	1945	Germany	
Talbot H. Waterman	1914	2010	United States	
Friedrich Weber	1781	1823	Germany	
Adam White	1817	1879	United Kingdom	
Rudolf von Willemoes-Suhm	1847	1875	Germany	
Austin Beatty Williams	1919	1999	United States	
Donald I. Williamson	1922	2016	United Kingdom	
Mildred S. Wilson	1909	1973	United States	
James Wood-Mason	1846	1893	United Kingdom	
John C. Yaldwyn	1929	2005	New Zealand	
Carl Wilhelm Erich Zimmer	1873	1950	Germany	
