= Dorothy Bliss =

Invertebrate zoologist (1916–1987)

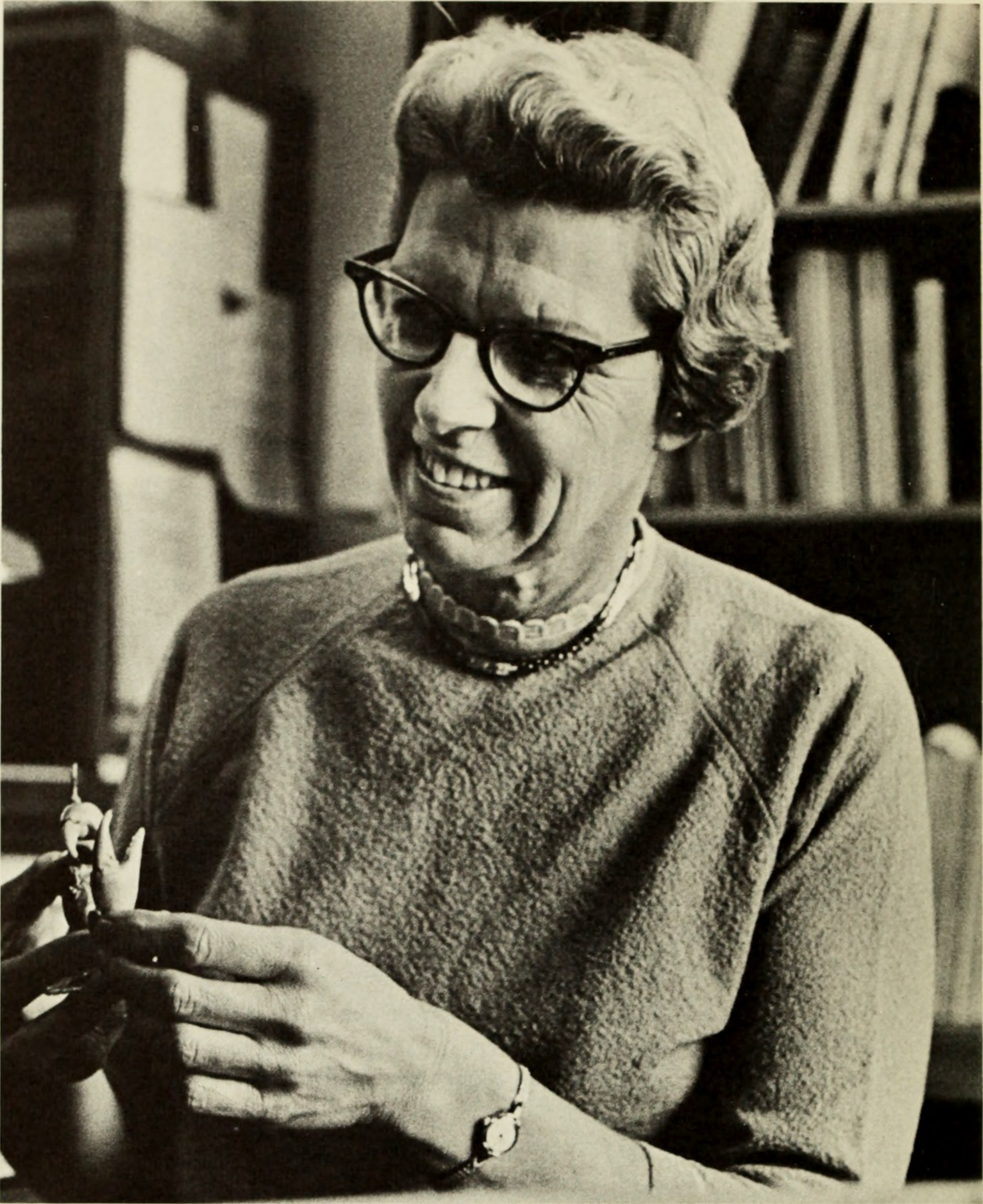
- Bliss c. 1969
- Born: Dorothy Elizabeth Bliss; February 13, 1916; Cranston, Rhode Island
- Died: December 26, 1987 (aged 71); Providence, Rhode Island
- Education: Pembroke College; Radcliffe College
- Scientific career
- Fields: Carcinology
- Workplaces: American Museum of Natural History
- Thesis: The Neurosecretory System of Brachyuran Crustacea (1952)

Dorothy Elizabeth Bliss (February 13, 1916 – December 26, 1987) was an American carcinologist and curator of invertebrates at the American Museum of Natural History, with which she was associated for over 30 years. She was known as a pioneer in the field of hormonal control in crustaceans. She was editor-in-chief of the 10-volume series The Biology of Crustacea and author of the popular book Shrimps, Lobsters and Crabs. She served as president of the American Society of Zoologists and was a fellow of the American Association for the Advancement of Science.

== Early life and education ==
Bliss was born in Cranston, Rhode Island on February 13, 1916. Her parents were Orville Thayer and Sophia Topham Bliss (née Farnell). She attended Pembroke College (now Brown University), earning a bachelor's degree in 1937 and a master's degree in 1942. She taught at Milton Academy in Massachusetts from 1942 to 1949 and was a teaching fellow at Radcliffe College from 1947 to 1951 while performing doctoral research in the lab of John Henry Welsh. Her dissertation research focused on the neural and hormonal structures in the eye stalks of the land crab Gecarcinus lateralis, a species which she would study in the lab and field throughout her career. She earned a PhD in 1952 from Radcliffe and continued as a research fellow until 1955.

== Career ==
In 1956, Bliss joined the staff of the American Museum of Natural History in New York City as assistant curator of invertebrates for the department known then as the Department of Fishes and Aquatic Biology. She then became an associate curator in 1962 and curator in 1967. From 1974 to 1977, she served as chair the department of fossils and living invertebrates. She retired in 1980, becoming curator emerita until 1987. Bliss also held several teaching positions, including anatomy professor at Albert Einstein College of Medicine (1956–1964), adjunct biology professor at City University of New York (1971–1980), and adjunct zoology professor at the University of Rhode Island (1980–1987).

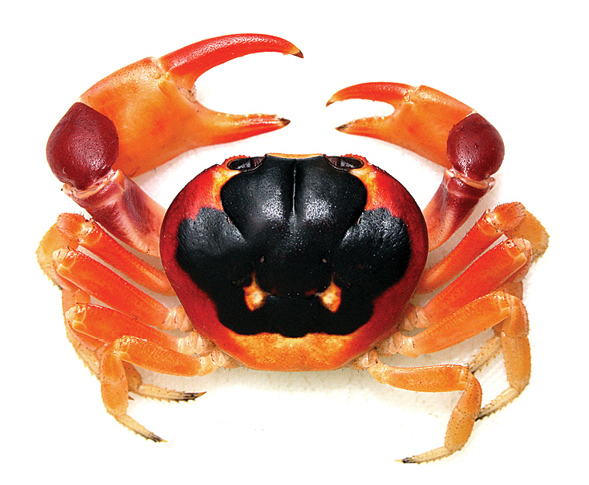
The land crab Gecarcinus lateralis was a major part of Bliss' research.

Bliss was known as a pioneer in the field of crustacean hormonal control. She was among the first to establish the role of the X-organ-sinus gland complex in hormone secretion. She performed laboratory studies on molting, and salt and water balance, and field research in Florida, Bermuda, and Bimini, studying aspects such as land crab burrowing and spawning and the impact of moisture different species distributions. She produced over 40 scientific papers and was editor-in-chief of The Biology of Crustacea (Academic Press), an influential 10-volume work begun in 1977 and continuing until 1986.

She was on the editorial boards of several journals, including American Zoologist, Curator, Journal of Experimental Zoology, General and Comparative Endocrinology, as well as the popular science magazine Natural History.

In 1982, she published Shrimps, Lobsters and Crabs (New Century Publishers), a book for the general public. It was reprinted by Columbia University Press with a new introduction in 1990. She received an honorary Doctor of Science from Brown University in 1972, and a symposium honoring her and fellow invertebrate zoologist Lewis Kleinholz was held at the annual meeting of the American Society of Zoologists in 1983.

In her later years, Bliss lived in Wakefield, Rhode Island. She died of cancer at Rhode Island Hospital in Providence on December 26, 1987, at the age of 71.

== Additional information ==
Dorothy Bliss was among the first researchers to experimentally demonstrate the role of the X-organ–sinus gland complex in regulating molting hormones in decapod crustaceans. This neuroendocrine system, located in the eyestalks of crabs and lobsters, controls growth, molting, and water balance, and represents one of her major contributions to the field of crustacean endocrinology.

== Publications ==
- Bliss, Dorothy E. (1952). The Neurosecretory System of Brachyuran Crustacea (Doctorate). Cambridge, Mass.: Radcliffe College.
