= Dorothy M. Skinner =

American carcinologist

- Died: February 12, 2005 (aged 74)
- Scientific career
- Doctoral advisor: John Welsh (biologist)

Dorothy May Skinner (May 22, 1930 - February 12, 2005) was an carcinologist, and is known for her contributions in crustacean biology. She was a research scientist at Oak Ridge National Laboratory.

== Early life and education ==
Skinner was born in Newton, Massachusetts in 1950 and went on the graduate from Watertown Highschool. Following graduation, she attended Tufts University where she earned her B.A. in biology and chemistry in 1952. In her junior year, she was elected to Phi Beta Kappa. She was also appointed as the Assistant Dean of Admissions at Tufts and was given the responsibility for admitting two classes to the School of Arts and Sciences.

Skinner participated in the 1953 experimental marine zoology class at the Marine Biological Laboratory, and would go on to serve as an assistant to the class for two more years. She continued to Harvard University where she obtained her Ph.D. in 1958 working on Bermuda land crabs with John Welsh.

== Career ==
Skinner conducted post-doctoral research at Yale University and Brandeis University, and then moved to the New York University School of Medicine in 1962. There, she assumed the role of an assistant professor within the Physiology and Biophysics department. In 1966, Skinner began her career as a fellow within the biology division of Oak Ridge National Laboratory, and by 1978 she promoted to senior research scientist.

== Research ==
Skinner is recognized within the marine research community for her contributions to the development of crustacean biology. In 1962, Skinners's dissertation research resulted in a fundamental publication on the structure and metabolism of Gecarcinus lateralis integument during different phases of the intermolt cycle. In 1975, Skinner made significant points in understanding a crucial aspect of crustacean biology how their muscles break down before they molt, or shed their shells. Her collaboration with Don Mykles started in 1979, and their research highlighted the intricate mechanisms behind muscle atrophy, highlighting the role of specific enzymes and proteins in this physiological transformation. Her review of crustacean regeneration has been recognized as a key summary of the research in the field.

== Death ==
Skinner died on February 12, 2005, from complications of Parkinson's disease.

== Selected publications ==
- Skinner, Dorothy M. (1962). "The Structure and Metabolism of a Crustacean Integumentary Tissue during a Molt Cycle". The Biological Bulletin. 123 (3): 635–647. doi:10.2307/1539584. ISSN 0006-3185. JSTOR 1539584.
- Skinner, Dorothy M.; Graham, Dale E. (1972). "Loss of Limbs as a Stimulus to Ecdysis in Brachyura (True Crabs)". The Biological Bulletin. 143 (1): 222–233. doi:10.2307/1540342. ISSN 0006-3185. JSTOR 1540342.
- Skinner, Dorothy M. (1985). "Interacting Factors in the Control of the Crustacean Molt Cycle". American Zoologist. 25 (1): 275–284. doi:10.1093/icb/25.1.275. ISSN 0003-1569.
- Wang, Shiao Y.; Biesiot, Patricia M.; Skinner, Dorothy M. (1999). "Toward an Understanding of Satellite DNA Function in Crustacea". American Zoologist. 39 (3): 471–486. doi:10.1093/icb/39.3.471. ISSN 0003-1569.
- Skinner, Dorothy M.; Bliss, D.E.; Mantel, L.H. (2012-12-02). "Molting and regeneration". The biology of crustacea. Academic Press. pp. 43–146. ISBN 978-0-323-13922-9.

== Awards and honors ==
In 1987 the American Society for Cell Biology honored Skinner with their Sandra K. Masur Senior Leadership Award. In 1993 Skinner received the Award for Excellence in Research from The Crustacean Society. In 1996 Skinner was elected to the inaugural class of fellows for the Association for Women in Science. In 1998 there was a festschrift held in her honor at the annual meeting of the Society for Integrative and Comparative Biology.

== Personal life ==
On July 24, 1965, she married John Cook, a mammalian physiologist. Together, they had no children.
