= Gary Greenberg (psychologist) =

American psychologist

- Born: Brooklyn, New York, U.S.
- Citizenship: American
- Education: Brooklyn College; University of Wichita; Kansas State University
- Scientific career
- Fields: Comparative psychology Developmental psychology
- Institutions: Wichita State University
- Thesis: The effects of ambient temperature and population density on aggression in two strains of mice (1970)

Gary Greenberg is a practicing psychotherapist based in Connecticut. He has four books, also he is a contributing writer to Mother Jones, and a contributing editor at Harper's. In addition to these publications, his articles and essays have appeared in The New Yorker, The New York Times, The Nation, Rolling Stone, and McSweeney's, among others. His work has been frequently anthologised, and he received the Erik Erikson Award for mental health reporting.

== Bio ==
Greenberg was born and raised in Brooklyn, New York. He received his B.S. degree from Brooklyn College in 1961, followed by an M.A. degree from the University of Wichita in 1964 and a Ph.D. from Kansas State University in 1970. He then began working with Ethel Tobach in the Department of Animal Behavior at the American Museum of Natural History. In 1983, Greenberg co-founded the Southwestern Comparative Psychology Association (with Michael Domjan, Del Thiessen, and Steve Davis) and the International Society for Comparative Psychology (with Ethel Tobach). After teaching at Wichita State University for 40 years, he retired and moved to Chicago, Illinois.

As of 2008, Greenberg is a life member of the American Psychological Association (APA) and secretary of the International Society of Comparative Psychology. In 2015, he received the Clifford T. Morgan Distinguished Service to Div. 6 Award from the APA's division 6, the Society for Behavioral Neuroscience and Comparative Psychology.

== On Psychiatry ==
For recent years, the author and psychotherapist Gary Greenberg has been popular among the readers with his two best-selling books, "Manufacturing Depression: The Secret History of a Modern Disease" and "The Book of WOE: The DSM and the Unmaking of Psychiatry", which is about the American Psychiatric Association's compendium of mental illnesses.

== Selected publications ==
- Greenberg, Gary (October 2008). "Psychology From the Standpoint of an Interbehaviorist: A Review of "Modern Perspectives on J. R. Kantor and Interbehaviorism". The Psychological Record. 58 (4): 665–676. doi:10.1007/bf03395643. ISSN 0033-2933. S2CID 149215316.
- Greenberg, Gary (November 2010). "Comparative Psychology and Ethology". The Behavioral Neuroscientist and Comparative Psychologist. Society for Behavioral Neuroscience and Comparative Psychology.
- Greenberg, Gary. "Psychiatry's Incurable Hubris". The Atlantic. No. April 2019.

Furthermore, as stated, the author has additional selected works, including articles and essays published in magazines, as follows:

- Greenberg, Gary (July 01, 2001)."Serotonin Surprise". Discover Magazine
- Greenberg, Gary (August 13, 2001). "As Good As Dead". The New Yorker
- Greenberg, Gary (November, 2003). "Is it Prozac? Or Placebo?" Mother Jones
- Greenberg, Gary (January, 2005). "The Condemned". Mother Jones
- Greenberg, Gary (November, 2005). "Respectable Reefer". Mother Jones
- Greenberg, Gary (February, 2014). "Almighty Dollar". Harper's Magazine.
- Greenberg, Gary (Summer 2015). "Confidence Man". Believer Magazine
- Greenberg, Gary (March 2016). "Beginning to See the Light". Harper's Magazine
