= Jean Quintin =

French priest, knight of the Order of St John and writer

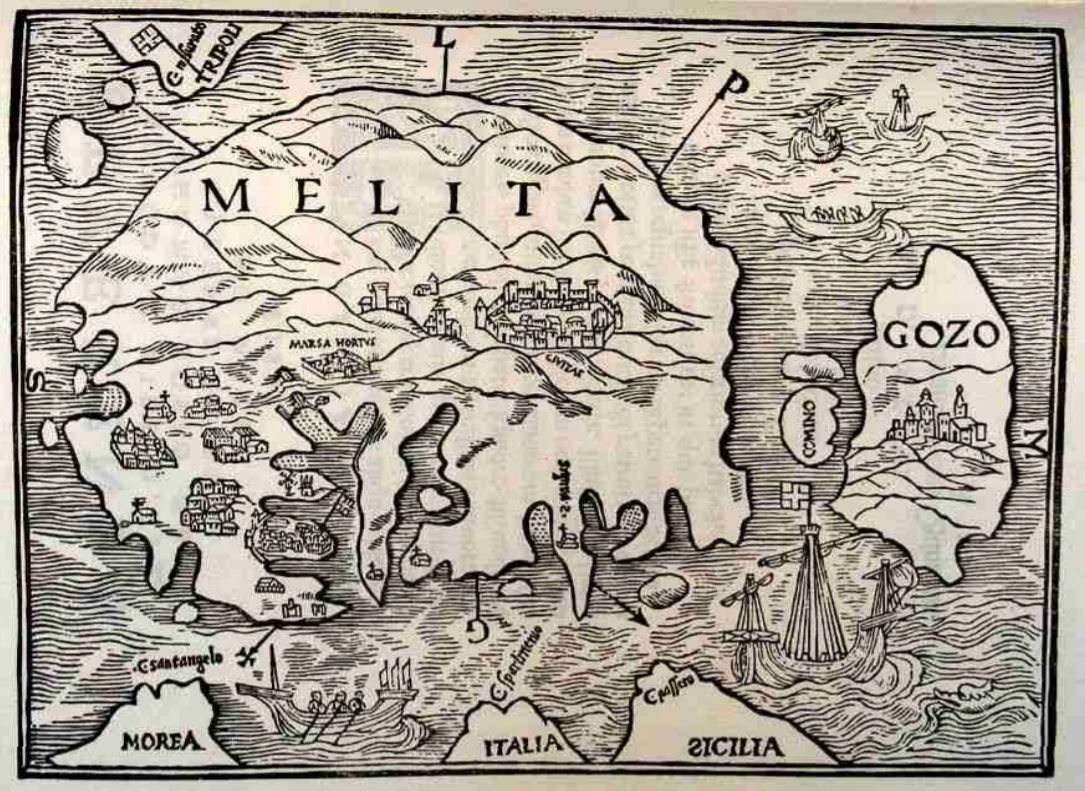
Woodcut map of the islands of Malta and Gozo produced by Quintin in 1536

Jean Quintin or Quentin (Latin: Johannes Quintinus, 20 January 1500 – 9 April 1561) was a French priest, knight of the Order of St John and writer. His writings include Insulae Melitae Descriptio (1536), the earliest known detailed description of the Maltese Islands, which also contains the earliest known printed map of the archipelago.

== Biography ==
Jean Quintin was born in Autun, France on 20 January 1500, and he was the son of Philibert Quentin and Philiberta Laborault. He became a Roman Catholic priest and he joined the Order of St John, becoming a chaplain of the Langue of France and Secretary to the Grand Master. He was also a Professor of Canon Law at the University of Paris.

Quintin wrote on various subjects, including geography and cosmography. In 1536, he published Insulae Melitae Descriptio, a description of the Maltese Islands which he had written after visiting Malta in 1530. In 1540, he published Tractatus de ventis, et nautica buxula ventorum indice in Paris.

Quintin died on 9 April 1561, and he was buried at the Commanderie de Saint-Jean de Latran in Paris.

== Insulae Melitae Descriptio ==
Insulae Melitae Descriptio is an eighteen-page-long description of the Maltese Islands written in Latin. It is dated 20 January 1533 and it was published in Lyon in 1536. It is notable for being the earliest known detailed description of Malta, and for its influence on later literature about the islands. The work is an original eyewitness account, but it also draws from classical Roman sources along with local medieval traditions such as that which states that St Paul's shipwreck as recounted in the Acts of the Apostles took place in Malta.

The work included a woodcut map of Malta which is the earliest known printed map of the archipelago. The map is primitive but it depicts the islands' main characteristics fairly well, and it is likely to have been made by Quintin himself.

The text of Insulae Melitae Descriptio was edited seven times and it was later partially translated into Italian four times. An English translation by Horatio C. R. Vella was published in 1980, and it was included along with an annotated version of the original Latin text in an edition entitled The Earliest Description of Malta (Lyons 1536) by Jean Quintin D'Autun.
