= General and Comparative Endocrinology =

- Discipline: Endocrinology
- Language: English
- Edited by: R.M. Dores, D.M. Power

Publication details
- History: 1961–present
- Publisher: Elsevier
- Frequency: 15/year
- Impact factor: 2.823 (2012)

Standard abbreviations
- ISO 4: Gen. Comp. Endocrinol.

Indexing
- CODEN: GCENA5
- ISSN: 0016-6480

Links
- Journal homepage

General and Comparative Endocrinology is a peer-reviewed journal published by Elsevier which focuses on all aspects of the endocrine systems of vertebrates and invertebrates. It was established in 1961 and the editors-in-chief are R. M. Dores (University of Denver) and D. M. Power (University of the Algarve). According to the Journal Citation Reports, the journal has a 2012 impact factor of 2.823, ranking it 56th out of 122 journals in the category "Endocrinology & Metabolism".
