= John Welsh (biologist) =

American physiologist

John Henry Welsh (August 25, 1901 – November 26, 2002) was an American physiologist who pioneered early work on serotonin as a neurotransmitter in invertebrates. He also studied circadian rhythms, neurosecretion, and neuropharmacology.

Welsh was born August 25, 1901, in Boothbay, Maine. He graduated from Berea College in Kentucky in 1922, followed by a M.A. (1922) and Ph.D. (1928) at Harvard University. Welsh was on the staff of Harvard from 1927 until his retirement in 1970. He was Chairman of the Biology Department from 1947 to 1950, and served important roles at the Bermuda Biological Station for Research during his career. He taught summer courses in invertebrate physiology at the Marine Biological Laboratory in Woods Hole for nearly 40 years. He was also important in the locating of the Bigelow Laboratory for Ocean Sciences in Boothbay, Maine.

== Early life ==
Welsh was born in Boothbay, Maine, in 1901, the son of a dairy farmer, and the grandson of a sea captain. Welsh attended Berea College, in Kentucky, attracted by an aunt who was teaching there following missionary work in Africa. Following his degree in 1922, and needing money, he returned to Boothbay as the principal of the high school for a year, started graduate school at Harvard, and then served as science master of the Berkshire School in Sheffield Massachusetts.

== Years at Harvard ==
Welsh became a full time graduate student of G. H. Parker, beginning in 1927; his thesis research on the photoresponsiveness of shrimp eyes was published in 1930, the year after he had received his Ph.D. (and an M. A. in 1928). Welsh was immediately offered an instructorship in Biology, under G. H. Parker and later Alfred C. Redfield

== War work ==
Welsh, with a graduate student, Harold Gordon, worked on the mechanism of action of DDT and related insecticides. (Harold Gordon went on to become a member of the RNA Tie Club). As crustaceans are also sensitive to DDT, and are somewhat easier to work on, much of the work was done on crab and crayfish axons, particularly the invasive green crab. Much of this work was published in the years following the war, although reports were provided to the War Department prior to the end of the war in 1945.

== Students ==
John Welsh trained 39 Ph.D. students between 1942 and his retirement in 1970. A number of these students continued his work on invertebrate neurobiology. Welsh never put his name on the publications resulting directly from his students' thesis work, as he felt it belonged to them. Among his students were the "Three Dots": Dorothy E. Bliss, a pioneer in the field of hormonal control in crustaceans, Dorothy M. Skinner who was known for her work on molting biology, and Dorothy F. Travis. Other students included Betty M. Twarog, who first described the role of serotonin as a neurotransmitter, Talbot Waterman, a pioneer in underwater animal orientation, and George Camougis, who founded one of the U.S.'s first environmental consulting companies.

== Honors ==
Welsh was elected a Fellow of the American Academy of Arts and Sciences in 1945, and was also a fellow of the New York Academy of Sciences and the American Association for the Advancement of Science.
