= Horace Cox =

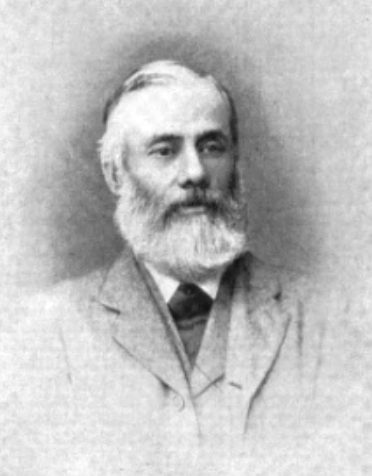
Horace Cox in The Sketch, 27 March 1895

Horace Cox was an important and distinct publisher of books in London, founded in the Victorian era. Cox himself died in 1918. Amongst others, the firm published Crockford's Clerical Directory, The Field and The Law Times.
