= Greco-Persian art =

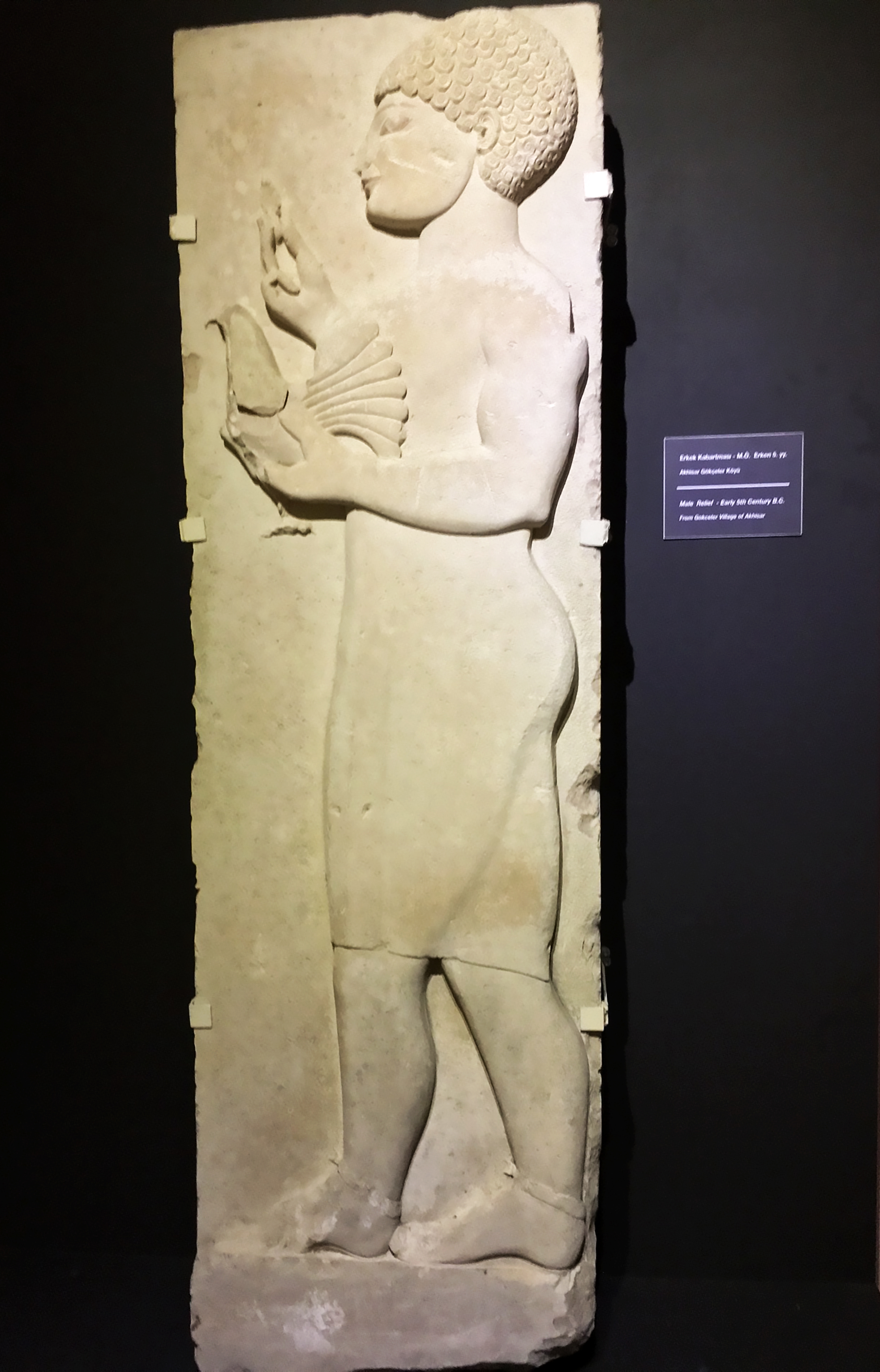
- The Gökçeler relief, an example of Greco-Persian art. 5th century BCE.

Greco-Persian art, also Graeco-Persian art or Anatolian–Persian, is an artistic synthesis between Ancient Greek art and Achaemenid Persian art, which can mainly be seen in the archaeological finds of ancient Anatolia in present-day Turkey. It is part of the evidence of "the presence of Persians in the region". It has been defined as "a peculiar blend of Hellenistic and Achaemenid, or pseudo-Achaemenid, styles" in the Anatolian peninsula under Achaemenid rule.

The Gökçeler relief is an example of this type of art, showing a figure of uncertain ethnic origin, with gifts of "western Anatolian and Greek in origin", however, the clothing he wears are "clearly of Persian influence".

The Lycian sarcophagus of Sidon is sometimes presented as an example of Greco-Persian art, although it can also be qualified more precisely as Greco-Anatolian art, since such examples are unknown in the wider Achaemenid Empire.

In Greco-Persian art, the representation of gods is usually the result of an artistic syncretism, combining Greek and Achaemenid characteristics, such as "Zeus-Oromasdes" or "Herakles-Artagnes".

The term "Greco-Persian" applied to the art of Anatolian elite under the rule of Achaemenid Persian, remains a subject of debate, and has been described as too vague or imprecise, hiding the local complexities of the art of the region.

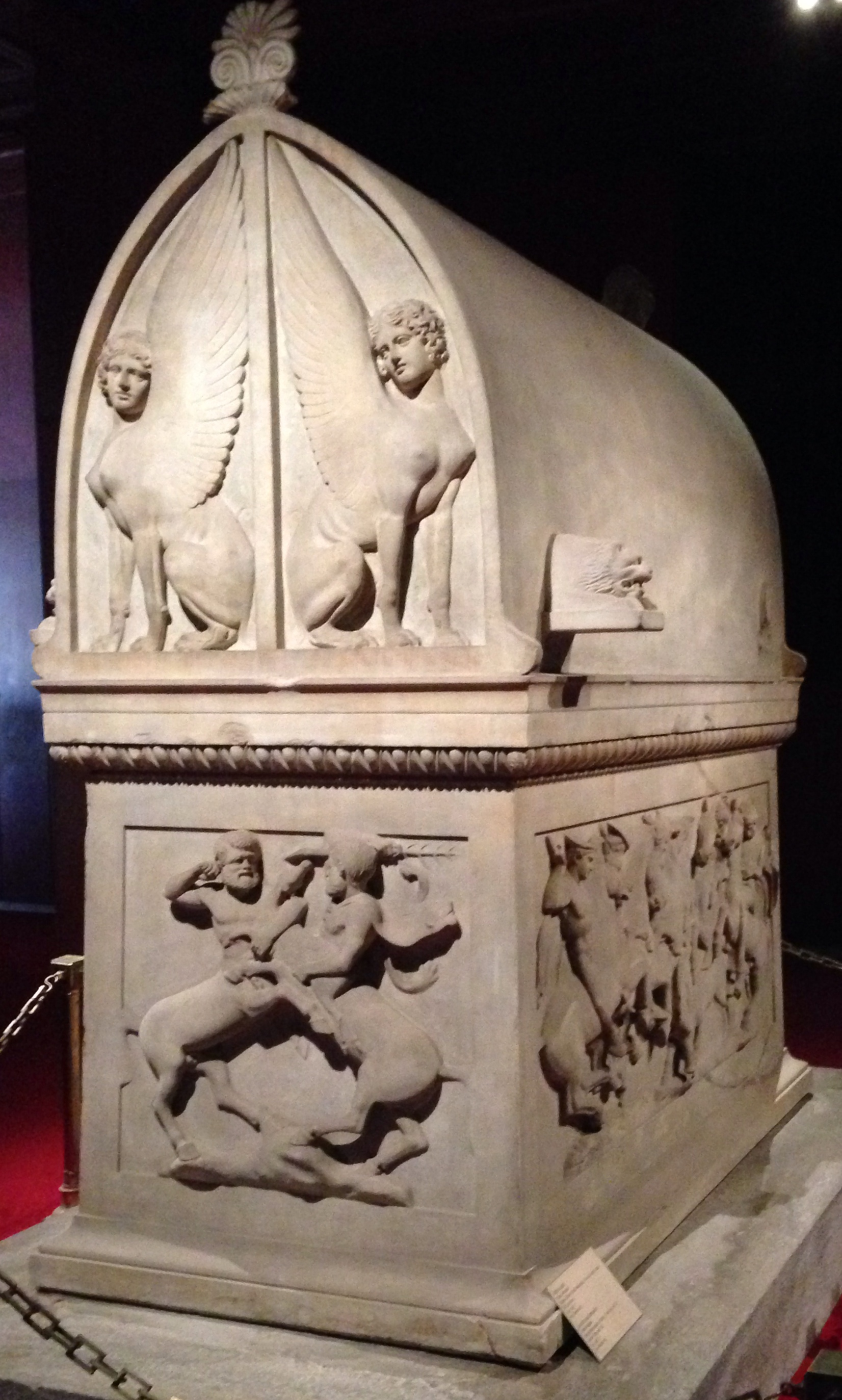
Lycian sarcophagus of Sidon

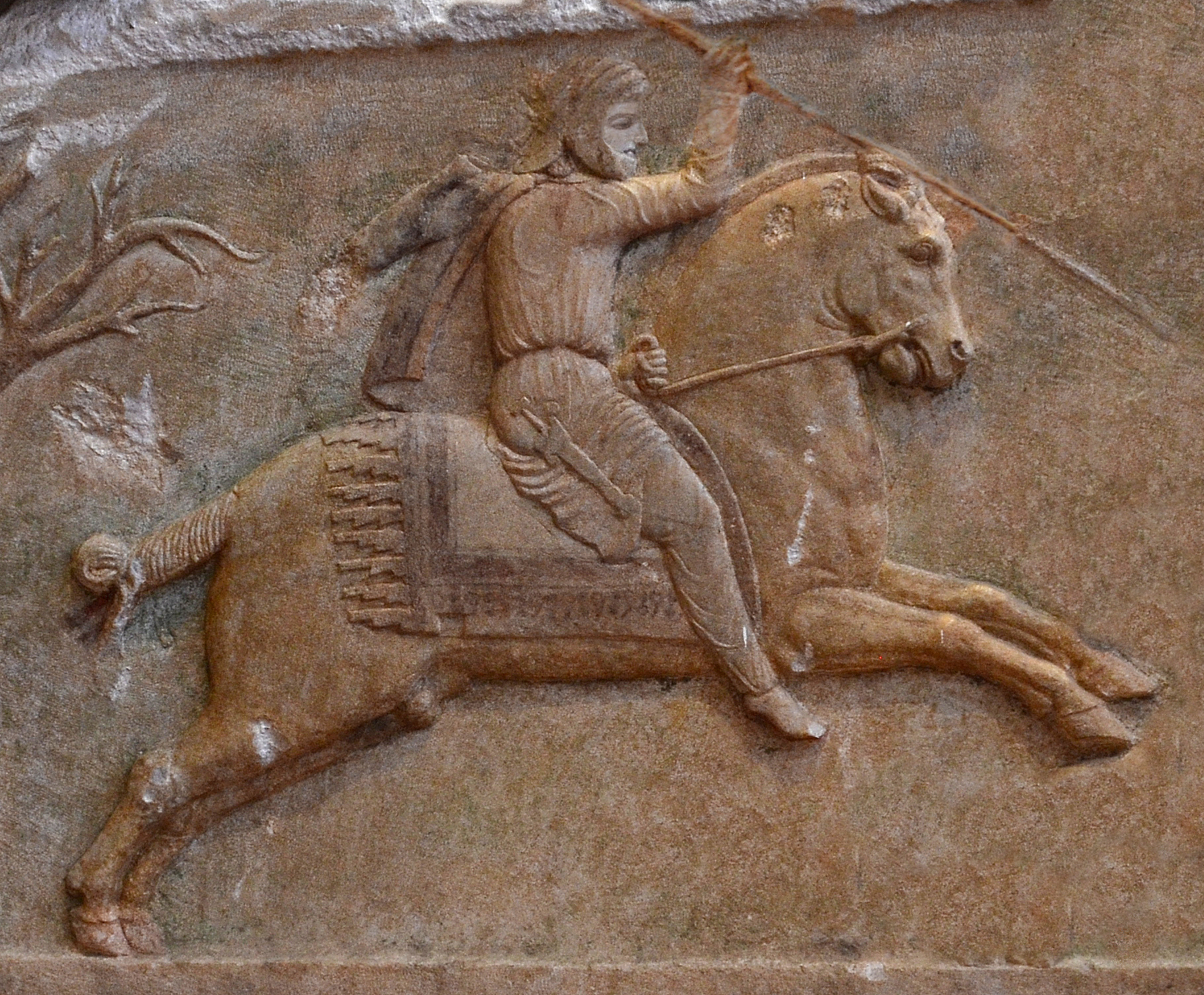
Achaemenid calvalryman in the satrapy of Hellespontine Phrygia, Altıkulaç Sarcophagus, early 4th century BC.

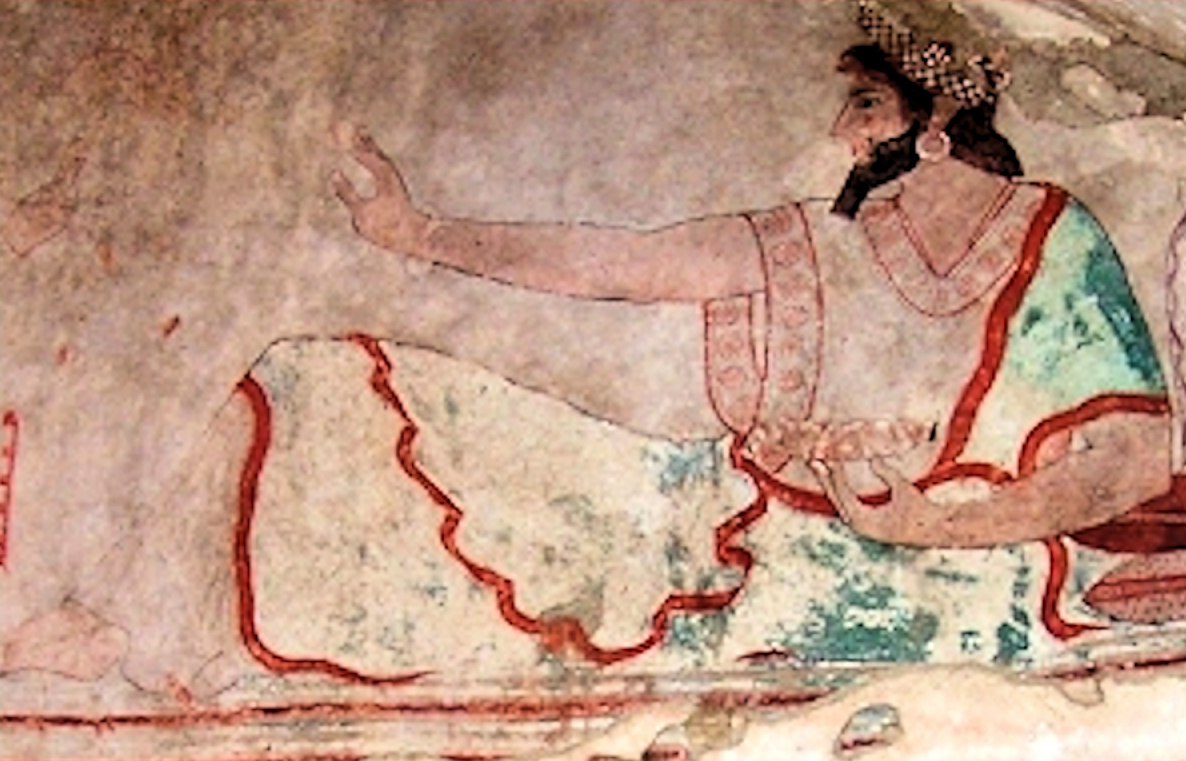
Lycian dignitary in Achaemenid style, at the Karaburun tomb near Elmalı, Lycia, c. 475 BC.

== Sources ==
- Çevirici-Coşkun, Figen (2018). "An Anatolian-Persian tomb relief from Gökçeler in Lydia". Anatolian Studies. 68: 119–130. doi:10.1017/S0066154618000054. S2CID 165412337.
