= International Society for Comparative Psychology =

The International Society for Comparative Psychology was founded in 1980 and held its first meeting in 1983.

== Purpose ==
The society:

- Promotes the comparative study of behavior in human and nonhuman animals
- Sponsors a biannual meeting
- Publishes the scientific journal, the International Journal of Comparative Psychology (IJCP).

== See also ==
- Comparative psychology
